= Timeline of musical events =

Contents:
Ancient music – Early history – 1500s – 1510s – 1520s – 1530s – 1540s – 1550s – 1560s – 1570s – 1580s – 1590s – 1600s – 1610s – 1620s – 1630s – 1640s – 1650s – 1660s – 1670s – 1680s – 1690s – 1700s – 1710s – 1720s – 1730s – 1740s – 1750s – 1760s – 1770s – 1780s – 1790s – 1800s – 1810s – 1820s – 1830s – 1840s – 1850s – 1860s – 1870s – 1880s – 1890s – 1900s – 1910s – 1920s – 1930s – 1940s – 1950s – 1960s – 1970s – 1980s – 1990s – 2000s – 2010s – 2020s - 2030s

This page indexes the individual year in music pages.

== 2020s ==
- 2027 in music, 2027 in American music
- 2026 in music, 2026 in American music
  - Deaths of Bob Weir, Kenny Morris, Rob Hirst, Francis Buchholz, Sly Dunbar, Billy Bass Nelson, Brad Arnold, Greg Brown, Neil Sedaka, Tommy DeCarlo, Country Joe MacDonald, Phil Campbell, Ross the Boss, Afrika Bambaataa, Moya Brennan, David Allan Coe, Alex Ligertwood, Jack Douglas, Ike Willis, Dick Parry, Rob Base, Sonny Rollins, Peabo Bryson, Dee Palmer, Oliver Tree, Dave Greenslade, Walter Parazaider, Tay Keith, Victor Willis, Lauren Bennett, Bonnie Tyler, Jennifer Finch, Lou Koller, Frank Beard, Janie Bradford, Hayden Panettiere, Dolly Parton, Tim Curry, Craig Douglas, Andy Williams, Cheetah Chrome, Pete Byrne, Pye Dubois, Gary McCracken, Sway, Duncan Sheik, Chad Gilbert, Angry Anderson, Jackie Jackson, Conrad Lant, Sass Jordan, Freddie Jackson, Tony Richards, John Christ, Tommy Mars
  - Notable releases:
    - Kreator's Krushers of the World
    - Megadeth's Megadeth
    - Olivia Rodrigo's You Seem Pretty Sad for a Girl So in Love
    - Charli XCX's Music, Fashion, Film
    - Madonna's Confessions II
- 2025 in music, 2025 in American music
  - Deaths of Peter Yarrow, Sam Moore, David Lynch, Garth Hudson, Unk, Aaron Rossi, Marianne Faithfull, Irv Gotti, Dave Jerden, Rick Buckler, Snowy Fleet, Jerry Butler, Voletta Wallace, Chris Jasper, Roberta Flack, Roy Ayers, Brian James, Les Binks, Clem Burke, Roy Thomas Baker, Mike Peters, Dale Henderson, Rick Derringer, Sly Stone, Brian Wilson, Mick Ralphs, Bobby Sherman, Lalo Schiffrin, Mickey MacConnell, Young Noble, Dave Cousins, Connie Francis, Ozzy Osbourne, George Kooymans, Chuck Mangione, Tom Lehrer, Paul Mario Day, Terry Reid, Brent Hinds, Mark Volman, Rick Davies, Sonny Curtis, Chris Dreja, John Lodge, Ian Watkins, D'Angelo, Ace Frehley, Sam Rivers, Anthony Jackson, Marcie Free, Jack DeJohnette, Mani, Jimmy Cliff, Leslie Fish, Steve Cropper, Tetsu Yamauchi, Abraham Quintanilla, Joe Ely, Chris Rea, Perry Bamonte
  - Notable releases:
    - The soundtrack to the Netflix and Sony Pictures Animation film KPop Demon Hunters
    - MJ Lenderman's Manning Fireworks
    - Taylor Swift's The Life of a Showgirl
    - Wednesday's Bleeds
    - Viagra Boys' Viagr Aboys
    - Bad Bunny's Debí Tirar Más Fotos
    - Rosalía's Lux
    - Geese's Getting Killed
    - Dijon's Baby
    - Clipse's Let God Sort Em Out
    - Pulp's More
- 2024 in music, 2024 in African music, 2024 in Asian music, 2024 in British music, 2024 in American music, 2024 in Canadian music, 2024 in Japanese music, 2024 in Philippine music, 2024 in Scandinavian music, 2024 in South Korean music
  - Deaths of Chris Karrer, Glynis Johns, David Soul, Larry Collins, James Kottak, Audie Blaylock, Bill Hayes, Laurie Johnson, Marlena Shaw, Frank Farian, Melanie, Wayne Kramer, Aston "Family Man" Barrett, Toby Keith, Mojo Nixon, Bobby Tench, Eric Carmen, Pete Rodriguez, Steve Harley, Michael Ward, Jerry Abbott, Clarence "Frogman" Henry, Mister Cee, Dickey Betts, Mike Pinder, Duane Eddy, Richard Tandy, Gary Floyd, Steve Albini, Charlie Colin, Doug Ingle, Mark Gormley, Richard M. Sherman, Rodger Fox, Cayouche, Doug Dagger, Ed Mann, Colin Gibb, Brother Marquis, C.Gambino, Rose-Marie, Enchanting, Françoise Hardy, Johnny Canales, Skowa, Dario G, Buzz Cason, James Chance, Kinky Friedman, John Mayall, Chino XL, Greg Kihn, Jack Russell, Fatman Scoop, Rich Homie Quan, Sérgio Mendes, Herbie Flowers, Will Jennings, Zoot Money, Tommy Cash, Tito Jackson, Nick Gravenites, Dick Diamonde, Kris Kristofferson, Cissy Houston, Liam Payne, Paul Di'Anno, DJ Clark Kent, Phil Lesh, Quincy Jones, Shel Talmy, Peter Sinfield, Chuck Woolery, Bob Bryar, Lennie De Ice, Anita Bryant, John Sykes
  - Notable releases:
    - Sabrina Carpenter's Short 'n Sweet
    - Cameron Winter's Heavy Metal
    - Charli XCX's Brat
    - Billie Eilish's HIT ME HARD AND SOFT
    - Magdalena Bay's Imaginal Disk
    - Juice WRLD's The Party Never Ends
    - Knocked Loose's You Won't Go Before You're Supposed To
    - Kendrick Lamar's GNX
    - Mannequin Pussy's I Got Heaven
    - Beyoncé's Cowboy Carter
    - The Cure's Songs of a Lost World
    - Tyler, the Creator's Chromakopia
    - Geordie Greep's The New Sound
- 2023 in music, 2023 in African music, 2023 in Asian music, 2023 in British music, 2023 in American music, 2023 in Canadian music, 2023 in Japanese music, 2023 in Philippine music, 2023 in Scandinavian music, 2023 in South Korean music
  - Deaths of Gangsta Boo, Jeff Beck, Lisa Marie Presley, Robbie Bachman, Van Conner, David Crosby, Top Topham, Tom Verlaine, Barrett Strong, Burt Bacharach, Trugoy, Wayne Shorter, Steve Mackey, Gary Rossington, Jim Gordon, Bobby Caldwell, Fuzzy Haskins, Keith Reid, Ryuichi Sakamoto, Harry Belafonte, Gordon Lightfoot, Rolf Harris, Andy Rourke, Pete Brown, Chas Newby, Tina Turner, Cynthia Weil, Astrud Gilberto, Rick Froberg, Mo Foster, Coco Lee, Jane Birkin, Tony Bennett, Sinéad O'Connor, Randy Meisner, Carl Davis, Sixto Rodriguez, Robbie Robertson, Magoo, Bernie Marsden, Jimmy Buffett, Steve Harwell, Gary Wright, Bruce Guthro, Carla Bley, The 45 King, Charlie Dominici, Mars Williams, Geordie Walker, Shane MacGowan, Denny Laine, Colin Burgess, Eric Moyo, Torben Ulrich, Tom Smothers, Sandra Reaves-Phillips
  - Notable releases:
    - Travis Scott's Utopia
    - 100 gecs' 10,000 Gecs
    - Blur's The Ballad of Darren
    - Black Country, New Road's Live at Bush Hall
    - Chappell Roan's The Rise and Fall of a Midwest Princess
    - King Gizzard & the Lizard Wizard's PetroDragonic Apocalypse; or, Dawn of Eternal Night: An Annihilation of Planet Earth and the Beginning of Merciless Damnation
    - Metallica's 72 Seasons
    - NF's Hope
    - Paramore's This Is Why
    - Young Fathers' Heavy Heavy
    - Miley Cyrus' Endless Summer Vacation
    - NewJeans' Get Up
- 2022 in music, 2022 in African music, 2022 in Asian music, 2022 in British music, 2022 in American music, 2022 in Canadian music, 2022 in Japanese music, 2022 in Philippine music, 2022 in Scandinavian music, 2022 in South Korean music
  - Deaths of Ronnie Spector, Meat Loaf, Jon Zazula, Mark Lanegan, Gary Brooker, Betty Davis, Timmy Thomas, Taylor Hawkins, Chris Bailey, Gilbert Gottfried, Jewell, Vangelis, Andy Fletcher, Alan White, Ronnie Hawkins, Trouble, Alec John Such, Jim Seals, Q Lazzarus, Olivia Newton-John, Lamont Dozier, PnB Rock, Ramsey Lewis, Jesse Powell, Pharoah Sanders, Coolio, Loretta Lynn, Angela Lansbury, Jerry Lee Lewis, D.H. Peligro, Takeoff, Aaron Carter, Gal Costa, Nik Turner, Keith Levene, Irene Cara, Christine McVie, Bob McGrath, Jet Black, Thom Bell, Sidhu Moose Wala
  - American Heavy Metal band W.A.S.P. Announces 40th Anniversary tour, returning to the United States for the first time since 2012.
  - Notable releases:
    - Pink Floyd and Andriy Khlyvnyuk's "Hey, Hey, Rise Up!"
    - Black Country, New Road's Ants from Up There
    - Denzel Curry's Melt My Eyez See Your Future
    - Mitski's Laurel Hell
    - Big Thief's Dragon New Warm Mountain I Believe in You
    - Charli XCX's Crash
    - Rosalía's Motomami
    - Viagra Boys' Cave World
    - Black Midi's Hellfire
    - Zeal & Ardor's Zeal & Ardor
    - Voivod's Synchro Anarchy
    - Kendrick Lamar's Mr. Morale & the Big Steppers
    - JID's The Forever Story
    - Angel Olsen's Big Time
    - Harry Styles' Harry's House
    - Bad Bunny's Un Verano Sin Ti
    - Beyoncé's Renaissance
    - SZA's SOS
    - Taylor Swift's Midnights
- 2021 in music, 2021 in African music, 2021 in British music, 2021 in Asian music, 2021 in American music, 2021 in Canadian music, 2021 in European music, 2021 in Japanese music, 2021 in Philippine music, 2021 in Scandinavian music, 2021 in South Korean music
  - Deaths of Gerry Marsden, Sophie, DMX, Young Dolph, Phil Spector, Samuel E. Wright, Gift of Gab, Joey Jordison, Bunny Wailer, Tom T. Hall, Michael Nesmith, Hub, Milford Graves, Anita Lane, Biz Markie, Dusty Hill, Jerzy Matuszkiewicz, Don Everly
  - Notable releases:
    - Black Country, New Road's For the First Time
    - Weezer's OK Human
    - Julien Baker's Little Oblivions
    - Lana Del Rey's Chemtrails over the Country Club
    - Taylor Swift's Fearless (Taylor's Version) and Red (Taylor's Version)
    - Adele's 30
    - ABBA's Voyage, with a virtual concert of the same name that accompanies both the album and a few of its songs, along with plenty of the band's older songs, premiering in London the following year.
    - Kanye West's Donda
    - Lana Del Rey's Blue Banisters
    - Radiohead's Kid A Mnesia
    - Iron Maiden's Senjutsu
    - Turnstile's Glow On
    - Tyler, the Creator's Call Me If You Get Lost
    - Black Midi's Cavalcade
    - Little Simz's Sometimes I Might Be Introvert
    - Injury Reserve's By the Time I Get to Phoenix
    - Squid's Bright Green Field
    - Silk Sonic's An Evening with Silk Sonic
    - JPEGMafia's LP!
    - Brockhampton's Roadrunner: New Light, New Machine
    - Lingua Ignota's Sinner Get Ready
    - Magdalena Bay's Mercurial World
    - Japanese Breakfast's Jubilee
    - Olivia Rodrigo's SOUR
    - Doja Cat's Planet Her
    - Billie Eilish's Happier Than Ever
    - Lorde's Solar Power
    - Halsey's If I Can't Have Love, I Want Power
    - Coldplay's Music of the Spheres
    - NF's Clouds (The Mixtape)
    - Floating Points, Pharoah Sanders, and the London Symphony Orchestra's Promises
    - Godspeed You! Black Emperor's G_d's Pee at State's End!
    - Madlib's Sound Ancestors
    - Juice WRLD's Fighting Demons
    - BTS' single Butter
    - Tomorrow X Together's The Chaos Chapter: Freeze
    - Chungha's Querencia
    - NCT Dream's Hot Sauce
    - Twice's Formula of Love: O+T=＜3
    - IU's Lilac
    - Shinee's Don't Call Me
    - Stray Kids' Noeasy
    - (G)I-dle's I Burn
    - Aespa's Savage
    - Parannoul's To See the Next Part of the Dream
    - Chai's Wink
    - Måneskin's Teatro d'ira: Vol. I, which includes the band's commercial breakthrough hit Zitti e buoni, that won the Eurovision Song Contest 2021.
- 2020 in music, 2020 in African music, 2020 in British music, 2020 in Asian music, 2020 in American music, 2020 in Canadian music, 2020 in European music, 2020 in Japanese music, 2020 in Philippine music, 2020 in Scandinavian music, 2020 in South Korean music
  - Deaths of Pop Smoke, Neil Peart, Bob Shane, McCoy Tyner, Bill Withers, John Prine, Fred the Godson, Little Richard, Kenny Rogers, Florian Schneider, Joe Diffie, Charlie Daniels, Tim Smith, Eddie Van Halen, Mory Kanté, Krzysztof Penderecki, Ennio Morricone, MF Doom, King Von, Nikki McKibbin, Naya Rivera
  - Notable releases:
    - The Weeknd's After Hours
    - Ariana Grande's Positions
    - Selena Gomez's Rare
    - Westside Gunn's Pray for Paris
    - Lady Gaga's Chromatica
    - Dua Lipa's Future Nostalgia
    - Yves Tumor's Heaven to a Tortured Mind
    - Fiona Apple's Fetch the Bolt Cutters
    - Phoebe Bridgers' Punisher
    - Run the Jewels's RTJ4
    - Tame Impala's The Slow Rush
    - Halsey's Manic
    - Lil Uzi Vert's Eternal Atake
    - Testament's Titans of Creation
    - Taylor Swift's Folklore and Evermore
    - The Microphones's Microphones in 2020
    - Paul McCartney's McCartney III
    - The Aquabats' Kooky Spooky...In Stereo
    - Oneohtrix Point Never's Magic Oneohtrix Point Never
    - Against All Logic's 2017–2019
    - Autechre's Sign
    - Kenshi Yonezu's Stray Sheep
    - Ichiko Aoba's Windswept Adan
    - Rina Sawayama's Sawayama
    - BTS' Map of the Soul: 7 and Be
    - Blackpink's The Album
    - NCT's Neo Zone and NCT 2020 Resonance
    - Twice's Eyes Wide Open
    - Stray Kids' Go Live
    - Yukika Teramoto's Soul Lady
    - BoA's Better
    - Taemin's Never Gonna Dance Again
    - Tomorrow X Together's Minisode1: Blue Hour
    - Juice WRLD's Legends Never Die
  - The COVID-19 pandemic results in the cancellation or postponement of numerous music-related events scheduled to take place this year, including major tours, festivals and television appearances.

== 2010s ==
- 2019 in music, 2019 in African music, 2019 in American music, 2019 in Asian music, 2019 in British music, 2019 in Canadian music, 2019 in Danish music, 2019 in European music, 2019 in Finnish music, 2019 in Icelandic music, 2019 in Irish music, 2019 in Japanese music, 2019 in Norwegian music, 2019 in Philippine music, 2019 in Scandinavian music, 2019 in South Korean music, 2019 in Swedish music
- Deaths of Michel Legrand, André Previn, Doris Duke, Peggy Lipton, Doris Day, Dr. John, João Gilberto, Ric Ocasek, Ginger Baker, Juice WRLD, Keith Flint, Nipsey Hussle
  - Notable releases:
    - Maggie Rogers’ Heard It In A Past Life
    - Ariana Grande's Thank U, Next
    - Madonna's Madame X
    - Bring Me the Horizon's Amo
    - Lewis Capaldi's Divinely Uninspired to a Hellish Extent
    - Tool's Fear Inoculum
    - Tyler, The Creator's Igor
    - Toby Marlow and Lucy Moss' musical Six (originally performed in 2017) debuts in the West End
    - Charli XCX's Charli
    - Lana Del Rey's Norman F***ing Rockwell!
    - Taylor Swift's Lover
    - FKA Twigs's Magdalene
    - Freddie Gibbs & Madlib's Bandana
    - Weyes Blood's Titanic Rising
    - Carly Rae Jepsen's Dedicated
    - Nick Cave and the Bad Seeds' Ghosteen
    - DaBaby' Baby on Baby
    - Thom Yorke' Anima
    - BTS' Map of the Soul: Persona
    - Billie Eilish's When We All Fall Asleep, Where Do We Go?
    - NF's The Search
    - Juice WRLD's Death Race for Love
    - Babymetal's Metal Galaxy
- 2018 in music, 2018 in African music, 2018 in American music, 2018 in Australian music, 2018 in British music, 2018 in Canadian music, 2018 in Chinese music, 2018 in Danish music, 2018 in European music, 2018 in Finnish music, 2018 in Icelandic music, 2018 in Japanese music, 2018 in Norwegian music, 2018 in Philippine music, 2018 in Scandinavian music, 2018 in South Korean music, 2018 in Swedish music
  - Deaths of Hugh Masekela, Tom Rapp, Vic Damone, Bud Luckey, Fredo Santana, Craig Mack, Avicii, XXXTentacion, Jimmy Wopo, Joe Jackson, Aretha Franklin, Mac Miller, Dolores O'Riordan, Charles Aznavour, Pete Shelley
  - Notable releases:
    - Ariana Grande's Sweetener
    - Christina Aguilera's Liberation
    - Earl Sweatshirt's Some Rap Songs
    - Car Seat Headrest's Twin Fantasy (Face to Face), a reworking of their 2011 album Twin Fantasy
    - Migos' Culture II
    - Juice WRLD's Goodbye & Good Riddance
    - Nasty C's Strings and Bling
    - Camila Cabello's self-titled album
    - Panic! At the Disco's Pray for the Wicked
    - Kendrick Lamar's Black Panther: The Album for the 2018 Marvel Cinematic Universe film Black Panther
    - Cardi B's Invasion of Privacy
    - Kacey Musgraves's Golden Hour
    - Parquet Courts' Wide Awake!
    - A Perfect Circle's Eat the Elephant
    - Kanye West's Ye
    - Nas's NASIR
    - Mac Miller's Swimming
    - Eminem's Kamikaze
    - Paul McCartney's Egypt Station
    - Brockhampton's Iridescence
    - Kids See Ghosts's self-titled album
    - Khruangbin's Con Todo el Mundo
    - Molchat Doma's Etazhi
    - Daughters' You Won't Get What You Want
    - Noname's Room 25
    - Tim Hecker's Konoyo
    - Jon Hopkins's Singularity
    - Against All Logic's 2012–2017
    - BTS' Love Yourself: Tear
    - Exo's Don't Mess Up My Tempo
    - Blackpink's Square Up
    - Monsta X's Take.1 Are You There?
- 2017 in music, 2017 in African music, 2017 in American music, 2017 in Australian music, 2017 in British music, 2017 in Canadian music, 2017 in Chinese music, 2017 in Danish music, 2017 in European music, 2017 in Finnish music, 2017 in Icelandic music, 2017 in Japanese music, 2017 in Norwegian music, 2017 in Philippine music, 2017 in Scandinavian music, 2017 in South Korean music, 2017 in Swedish music
  - Deaths of Tom Petty, Chester Bennington, Al Jarreau, Fats Domino, Allan Holdsworth, Chuck Berry, J. Geils, John Wetton, Larry Coryell, Svend Asmussen, Chris Cornell, Gregg Allman, Butch Trucks, Rosalie Sorrels, Prodigy, Glen Campbell, Walter Becker, Grant Hart, Walter "Junie" Morrison, Jaki Liebezeit, Holger Czukay, David Cassidy, Johnny Hallyday, Keely Smith, Malcolm Young, Pierre Henry and Lil Peep
  - The One Love Manchester event takes place after the devastating Manchester Arena bomb attacks, following an Ariana Grande concert.
  - Notable releases:
    - Katy Perry's Witness
    - Taylor Swift's Reputation
    - Imagine Dragons' Evolve
    - Jay Z's 4:44
    - Linkin Park's One More Light
    - Sepultura's Machine Messiah
    - The xx's I See You
    - Sam Smith's The Thrill of It All
    - Stormzy's Gang Signs & Prayer
    - Demi Lovato's Tell Me You Love Me
    - Dua Lipa's self-titled debut album
    - Sampha's Process
    - Ed Sheeran's ÷
    - Thundercat's Drunk
    - Lorde's Melodrama
    - Pasek and Paul's soundtrack to the 20th Century Fox musical film The Greatest Showman
    - Kendrick Lamar's Damn
    - Rag'n'Bone Man's Human
    - NF's Perception
    - SZA's Ctrl
    - Drake's More Life
    - Smino's blkswn
    - Tyler, The Creator's Flower Boy
    - BROCKHAMPTON's Saturation, Saturation II, and Saturation III
    - Rex Orange County's Apricot Princess
    - Father John Misty's Pure Comedy
    - Ryuichi Sakamoto's async
  - Luis Fonsi and Daddy Yankee release the record breaking hit single "Despacito".
- 2016 in music, 2016 in African music, 2016 in American music, 2016 in Asian music, 2016 in Australian music, 2016 in Brazilian music,2016 in British music, 2016 in Canadian music, 2016 in Chinese music, 2016 in Danish music, 2016 in European music (Continental Europe), 2016 in Finnish music, 2016 in French music, 2016 in German music, 2016 in Icelandic music, 2016 in Indian music, 2016 in Irish music, 2016 in Japanese music, 2016 in Malaysian music, 2016 in Norwegian music, 2016 in Philippine music, 2016 in Scandinavian music, 2016 in South Korean music, 2016 in Swedish music, 2016 in Vietnamese music
  - Deaths of Juan Gabriel, Paul Bley, Pierre Boulez, Elizabeth Swados, David Bowie, Paul Kantner, Glenn Frey, Leif Solberg, Harald Devold, George Martin, Naná Vasconcelos, Keith Emerson, Merle Haggard, Christina Grimmie, Glenn Yarbrough, Dan Hicks, Maurice White, Pete Burns, John Berry, Vanity, Prince, Oscar Brand, Mose Allison, Nick Menza, the members of Viola Beach, Fred Hellerman, Leonard Cohen, Leon Russell, Sharon Jones, Phife Dawg, Greg Lake and George Michael
  - Notable releases:
    - David Bowie's Blackstar
    - Chance the Rapper's Coloring Book
    - Leonard Cohen's You Want It Darker
    - Gwen Stefani's This Is What the Truth Feels Like
    - Ariana Grande's Dangerous Woman
    - Britney Spears' Glory
    - A Tribe Called Quest's We Got It from Here... Thank You 4 Your Service
    - Nick Jonas's Last Year Was Complicated
    - Bruno Mars's 24K Magic
    - Post Malone's Stoney
    - Green Day's Revolution Radio
    - Blink-182's California
    - Lady Gaga's Joanne
    - Beyoncé's Lemonade
    - Drake's Views
    - Yussef Kamaal's Black Focus
    - Rihanna's Anti
    - Tove Lo's Lady Wood
    - The Weeknd's Starboy
    - Avenged Sevenfold's The Stage
    - Metal Church's XI
    - Metallica's Hardwired... to Self-Destruct
    - Megadeth's Dystopia
    - Anthrax's For All Kings
    - Testament's Brotherhood of the Snake
    - Bon Jovi's This House Is Not for Sale
    - NF's Therapy Session
    - Kanye West's The Life of Pablo
    - Solange's A Seat at the Table
    - Panic! at the Disco's Death of a Bachelor
    - Kendrick Lamar's Untitled Unmastered
    - Childish Gambino's "Awaken, My Love!"
    - Kings of Leon's Walls
    - Radiohead's A Moon Shaped Pool
    - Frank Ocean's Blonde and Endless
    - BTS' Wings
    - Babymetal's Metal Resistance
    - Justin Timberlake's record breaking single "Can't Stop the Feeling" (from the soundtrack to the DreamWorks Animation film Trolls).
- 2015 in music, 2015 in American music, 2015 in Australian music, 2015 in British music, 2015 in Canadian music, 2015 in Chinese music, 2015 in Danish music, 2015 in European music (Continental Europe), 2015 in Finnish music, 2015 in Icelandic music, 2015 in Indian music, 2015 in Irish music, 2015 in Japanese music, 2015 in Philippine music, 2015 in South Korean music, 2015 in Norwegian music, 2015 in Swedish music
  - Deaths of Lemmy, Clark Terry, Erik Amundsen, Rod McKuen, John Eaton, Lesley Gore, Percy Sledge, Ben E. King, B.B. King, Jean Ritchie, Ronnie Gilbert, Ornette Coleman, Theodore Bikel, Bob Johnston, Kurt Masur, Nora Brockstedt, Scott Weiland, Svein Christiansen, Gary Richrath, Dallas Taylor, Kim Fowley, James Last and Natalie Cole.
  - Notable releases:
    - Twenty One Pilots's Blurryface
    - Coldplay's A Head Full of Dreams
    - Blur's The Magic Whip
    - Kendrick Lamar's To Pimp A Butterfly
    - Breaking Benjamin's Dark Before Dawn
    - Disturbed's Immortalized
    - Jeff Lynne's ELO's Alone in the Universe
    - Sufjan Stevens's Carrie & Lowell
    - Travis Scott's Rodeo
    - Adele's 25
    - Iron Maiden's The Book of Souls
    - Tame Impala's Currents
    - Kamasi Washington's The Epic
    - Slayer's Repentless
    - Madonna's Rebel Heart
    - Marius Neset's Pinball
    - Dag Arnesen's Grieg, Tveitt & I
    - Olga Konkova Trio's The Goldilocks Zone
    - Death Grips's The Powers That B
    - Pentatonix's self-titled
    - Lin-Manuel Miranda's Hamilton
    - Faith No More's Sol Invictus
    - Demi Lovato's Confident
    - Selena Gomez's Revival
    - Oneohtrix Point Never's Garden of Delete
    - Carly Rae Jepsen's E•MO•TION
    - 2814's Birth of a New Day
    - NF's Mansion
    - Björk's Vulnicura
    - Death's Dynamic Shroud.wmv's I'll Try Living Like This
  - Silento releases his hit song Watch Me (Whip/Nae Nae), that creates a viral dance trend.
  - Wiz Khalifa and Charlie Puth release "See You Again" for the film, Furious 7, as a tribute to Paul Walker, who died in a car crash.
  - Jerry Lee Lewis embarks on a final tour of the UK.
- 2014 in music, 2014 in American music, 2014 in Asian music, 2014 in Australian music, 2014 in Brazilian music, 2014 in British music, 2014 in Canadian music, 2014 in Chinese music, 2014 in European music (Continental Europe), 2014 in Irish music, 2014 in Japanese music, 2014 in New Zealand music, 2014 in Norwegian music, 2014 in Philippine music, 2014 in South Korean music, 2014 in Swedish music
  - Death of Phil Everly, Pete Seeger, Casey Kasem, Bobby Womack, Tommy Ramone, Johnny Winter, Robin Williams, Paco De Lucia, Jack Bruce, Bobby Keys, Joe Cocker
  - Ringo Starr and Paul McCartney perform together on 50th anniversary celebration to the Beatles, with performances by various artists.
  - Notable releases:
    - Lady Gaga and Tony Bennett's Cheek to Cheek
    - Ed Sheeran's x
    - Linkin Park's The Hunting Party
    - Slipknot's .5: The Gray Chapter
    - Coldplay's Ghost Stories
    - Jackie Evancho's Awakening
    - Taylor Swift's 1989
    - Jake Bugg's Shangri-La
    - Sia's 1000 Forms of Fear
    - Bob Dylan's The Bootleg Series Vol. 11: The Basement Tapes Complete
    - J. Cole's 2014 Forest Hills Drive
    - U2's Songs of Innocence
    - Beck's Morning Phase
    - Freddie Gibbs and Madlib's Piñata
    - Aphex Twin's Syro
    - Machine Girl's WLFGRL
    - BadBadNotGood's III
    - Todd Terje's It's Album Time
    - Arca's Xen
    - NF's self-titled NF EP
    - Babymetal's self-titled debut album
    - Sam Smith's In the Lonely Hour
    - Nicki Minaj's Pinkprint
    - Pharrell Williams's Girl
    - Exodus' Blood In, Blood Out
    - Pink Floyd's The Endless River
  - Mark Ronson teams up with Bruno Mars to record the number one hit single Uptown Funk
- 2013 in music, 2013 in American music, 2013 in Australian music, 2013 in British music, 2013 in Canadian music, 2013 in European music (Continental Europe), 2013 in Irish music, 2013 in Japanese music, 2013 in Norwegian music, 2013 in South Korean music, 2013 in Swedish music
  - Death of Patti Page, Cecil Womack, Lil Snupe, Alvin Lee, Clive Burr, Jeff Hanneman, Lou Reed, Cory Monteith, and Ray Manzarek.
  - Notable releases:
    - Lorde's Pure Heroine
    - Lady Gaga's Artpop
    - Katy Perry's Prism
    - Justin Timberlake's The 20/20 Experience
    - Chance The Rapper's Acid Rap
    - Tyler, The Creator's Wolf
    - Daft Punk’s Random Access Memories
    - Boards of Canada’s Tomorrow's Harvest
    - Oneohtrix Point Never’s R Plus Seven
    - Tim Hecker’s Virgins
    - Jon Hopkins’ Immunity
    - William Onyeabor’s Who is William Onyeabor?
    - Kyary Pamyu Pamyu releases Nanda Collection
    - Anamanaguchi releases Endless Fantasy
    - My Bloody Valentine's m b v
    - Disclosure's Settle
    - Jay-Z's Magna Carta Holy Grail
    - Oneohtrix Point Never's R Plus Seven
  - Actress Anna Kendrick releases Cups (When I'm Gone) (featured on the soundtrack to the film Pitch Perfect)
- 2012 in music, 2012 in African music, 2012 in American music, 2012 in Asian music, 2012 in Australian music, 2012 in British music, 2012 in Canadian music, 2012 in European music (Continental Europe), 2012 in Norwegian music, 2012 in Irish music, 2012 in Japanese music, 2012 in New Zealand music, 2012 in Swedish music, 2012 in South Korean music
  - Death of Ian Bargh, Whitney Houston, Etta James, Ravi Shankar, Davy Jones, Robert B. Sherman, Earl Scruggs, Levon Helm, Adam Yauch, Donna Summer, Robin Gibb, Doc Watson, Bob Welch, Kitty Wells, Jon Lord, Andy Williams, Jenni Rivera, Mitch Lucker, Dietrich Fischer-Dieskau, Dave Brubeck and Richard Rodney Bennett.
  - The Beach Boys embark on a 2012 world tour celebrating their 50th Anniversary.
  - Swedish House Mafia announce their break up and embark on One Last Tour.
  - English singer-songwriter Jake Bugg releases his debut album, Jake Bugg.
  - Madonna's 12th studio album is released, entitled MDNA. It tops the charts across the globe including the United Kingdom where she becomes the solo artist with the most number one albums and the UK breaks the iTunes pre-order record. To support the album she embarks on The MDNA Tour which grosses over $305 million and becomes the second highest grossing female tour, behind her own Sticky and Sweet Tour.
  - South Korean pop singer Psy releases his album Psy 6 (Six Rules), Part 1, which includes the viral dance song, Gangnam Style, that becomes the most viewed YouTube video for 5 years.
  - Nicki Minaj releases her album Pink Friday: Roman Reloaded
  - Kesha releases Warrior
  - Taylor Swift releases Red
  - Tame Impala releases Lonerism
  - Kyary Pamyu Pamyu releases Pamyu Pamyu Revolution
  - Kendrick Lamar releases good kid, m.A.A.d city
  - Frank Ocean releases Channel Orange
  - Lana Del Rey releases Born to Die
  - Imagine Dragons release Night Visions
  - Godspeed You! Black Emperor release 'Allelujah! Don't Bend! Ascend!
  - The Wiggles release Surfer Jeff
  - Flying Lotus releases Until the Quiet Comes
  - Blank Banshee releases Blank Banshee 0
- 2011 in music, 2011 in American music, 2011 in Asian music, 2011 in British music, 2011 in Canadian music, 2011 in European music (Continental Europe), 2011 in Irish music, 2011 in Japanese music, 2011 in Norwegian music, 2011 in Swedish music
  - Death of Gerry Rafferty, Gary Moore, George Shearing, Mike Starr, Ferlin Husky, Gil Scott-Heron, Clarence Clemons, Amy Winehouse, Sylvia Robinson, Bert Jansch, and Dobie Gray.
  - English singer Adele released the album 21, which had sold 26.4 million copies worldwide according to the International Federation of the Phonographic Industry, became the best selling album in the past 15 years, and also won six Grammys.
  - Lady Gaga releases her iconic album Born This Way
  - Jessie J releases her debut studio album, Who You Are
  - LMFAO release the album Sorry for Party Rocking
  - Radiohead release the album The King of Limbs
  - Vektroid release the album Floral Shoppe
  - Oneohtrix Point Never releases the album Replica
  - The Caretaker releases the album An Empty Bliss Beyond This World
  - Tim Hecker releases the album Ravedeath, 1972
  - James Ferraro releases the album Far Side Virtual
  - The Wiggles releases the album Ukulele Baby!
  - Rustie releases the album Glass Swords
  - C418 releases Minecraft – Volume Alpha, the first soundtrack album to the sandbox video game Minecraft
  - Robert Lopez and South Park creators Trey Parker and Matt Stone team up and create the musical The Book of Mormon.
  - The Aquabats release the album Hi-Five Soup
  - Gotye releases the album Making Mirrors, which features the number one hit single "Somebody That I Used to Know"
  - Rebecca Black releases her debut single, "Friday", to scathing reviews, and being the most disliked YouTube video until it was taken down 6 months later.
- 2010 in music, 2010 in American music, 2010 in Asian music, 2010 in Australian music, 2010 in British music, 2010 in European music (Continental Europe), 2010 in Irish music, 2010 in Japanese music, 2010 in New Zealand music, 2010 in Norwegian music, 2010 in Philippine music, 2010 in Swedish music
  - Tour of Jerry Lee Lewis.
  - Metallica, Megadeth, Slayer and Anthrax perform together for the first time as part of the Big 4 shows.
  - Death of Teddy Pendergrass, Ed Thigpen, Kate McGarrigle, Ronnie James Dio, Peter Steele, Paul Gray, Lena Horne, Jimmy Dean, Tuli Kupferberg, Eddie Fisher, Joan Sutherland and Bobby Farrell.
  - Notable releases:
    - Gorillaz's Plastic Beach
    - Flying Lotus's Cosmogramma
    - Four Tet's There Is Love in You
    - Nicki Minaj's Pink Friday
    - Tim Minchin's Matilda the Musical
    - Kanye West's My Beautiful Dark Twisted Fantasy
    - Katy Perry's Teenage Dream
    - The Wiggles' Let's Eat
    - CeeLo Green's The Lady Killer
    - Kesha releases her first studio album, Kesha, as well as her first EP, Cannibal.
    - Yolanda Be Cool's "We No Speak Americano"
    - Bruno Mars's Doo-Wops and Hooligans
    - Australian musical project Tame Impala releases his debut album Innerspeaker

== 2000s ==
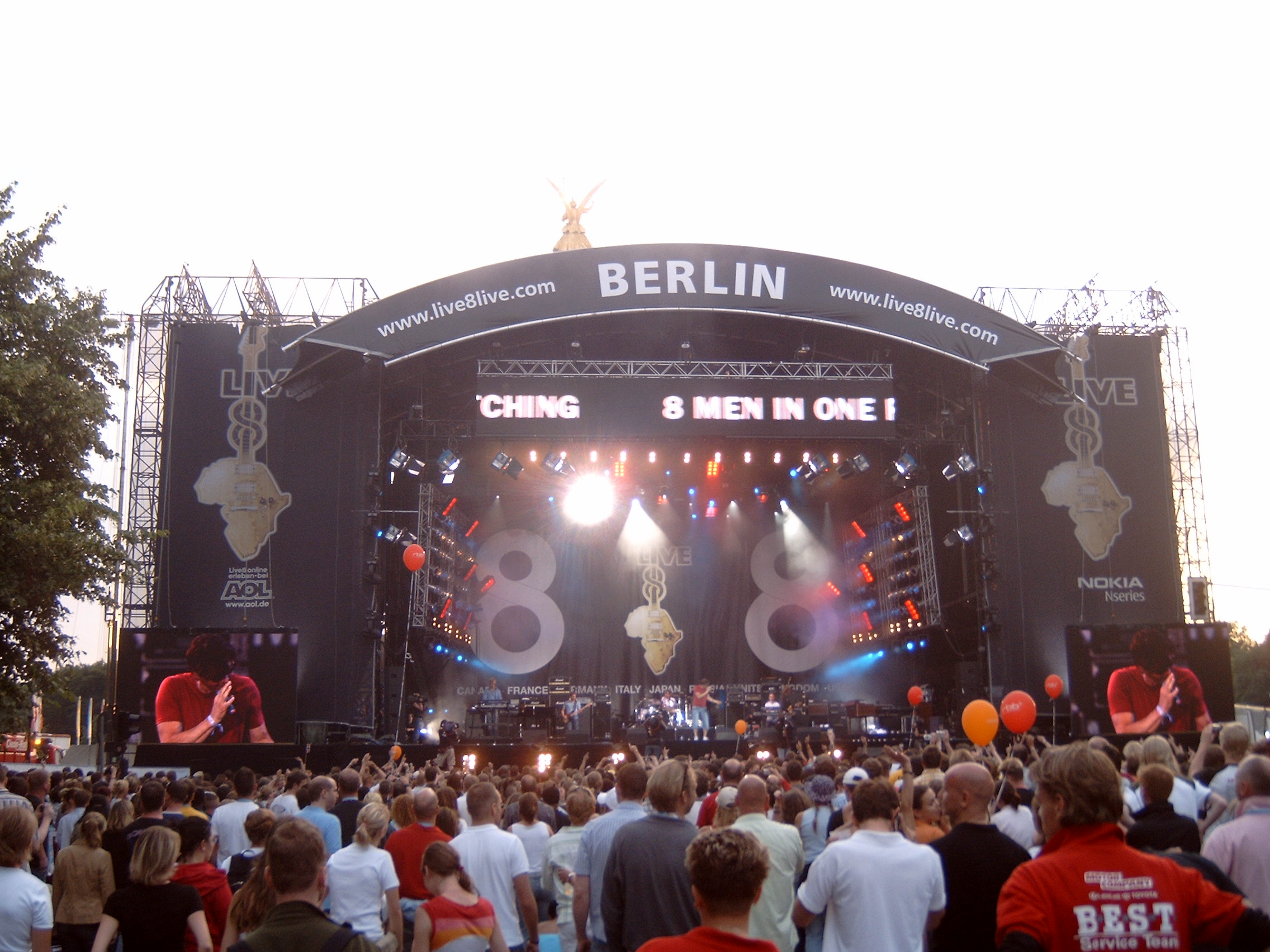
Live 8 concerts took place in 9 countries worldwide during 2005.

- 2009 in music, 2009 in British music, 2009 in Canadian music, 2009 in Irish music, 2009 in Japanese music, 2009 in Norwegian music, 2009 in South Korean music
  - Deaths of Michael Jackson, James Owen Sullivan, Leon Kirchner, Les Paul, Ali Akbar Khan, Merce Cunningham, Ron Asheton, Henri Pousseur, Mary Travers, Stephen Gately, and Alain Bashung.
  - Lady Gaga releases The Fame Monster
  - Britney Spears releases her comeback album Circus which receives critical acclaim.
  - They Might Be Giants release Here Comes Science.
  - Flo Rida releases his studio album R.O.O.T.S.. His lead single "Right Round" introduces future pop star Kesha to a mainstream audience.
  - Noel Gallagher departs from Oasis after a heated confrontation with vocalist and brother Liam Gallagher in Rock en Seine, France leading to the disbandment of Oasis.
  - Phoenix release Lisztomania
  - Animal Collective releases Merriweather Post Pavilion
  - Owl City releases Ocean Eyes
  - The Wiggles release Go Bananas!
  - Michael Bublé release Crazy Love
  - The Heavy release The House That Dirt Built
  - The Black Eyed Peas release The E.N.D
  - Ryuichi Sakamoto release Playing the Piano
- Debut of:
  - Susan Boyle's I Dreamed a Dream
- 2008 in music, 2008 in British music, 2008 in Canadian music, 2008 in Irish music, 2008 in Japanese music, 2008 in Norwegian music, 2008 in South Korean music
  - Deaths of Mauricio Kagel, Artie Traum, Wilfrid Mellers, LeRoi Moore, Erik Darling, Isaac Hayes, Bo Diddley, Richard Wright, Nick Reynolds, Mitch Mitchell, Miriam Makeba, Odetta, Eartha Kitt, Freddie Hubbard, and Robert Hazard.
  - Mariah Carey's "Touch My Body" becomes her 18th U.S. chart-topper, setting the record for most U.S. number ones singles by a solo artist – only behind the Beatles with 20 – and most weeks at number one on the Hot 100 chart with a total of 79.
  - Lil Wayne released Tha Carter III and sold 1 million copies in the first week, becoming the best selling album of 2008.
  - Madonna's Sticky and Sweet Tour becomes the highest grossing female tour of all-time (surpassing her own record) and then the highest grossing solo tour of all time. It promotes her 11th studio album Hard Candy which sells 4 million copies and includes the international hit song "4 Minutes".
  - Kanye West's 808s & Heartbreak
  - They Might Be Giants' Here Come the 123s
  - Coldplay's Viva la Vida or Death and All His Friends
  - Lady Gaga's first studio album, The Fame
  - Katy Perry releases her first studio album, One of the Boys
  - Taylor Swift's second studio album, Fearless releases.
  - Flying Lotus' Los Angeles
  - The Wiggles' You Make Me Feel Like Dancing
  - Earth's The Bees Made Honey in the Lion's Skull
  - DJ Sprinkles's Midtown 120 Blues
- 2007 in music, 2007 in British music, 2007 in Canadian music, 2007 in Irish music, 2007 in Japanese music, 2007 in Norwegian music, 2007 in South Korean music
  - Deaths of Beverly Sills, Max Roach, Oscar Peterson, Izumi Sakai, Luciano Pavarotti, Karlheinz Stockhausen, and Don Arden.
  - Live Earth and Led Zeppelin reunion.
  - Radiohead splits from EMI and independently releases In Rainbows with an online download method of payment that allows the buyer to choose their price.
  - The Mars Volta releases one of the first USB flash drive albums, as part of their The Bedlam in Goliath.
  - Kanye West releases Graduation
  - The Wiggles release Getting Strong! and Pop Go the Wiggles!
  - Mika releases Life in Cartoon Motion
  - Burial releases Untrue
  - Arcade Fire release Neon Bible
  - They Might Be Giants release The Else
  - Animal Collective releases Strawberry Jam
  - LCD Soundsystem releases Sound of Silver
  - MGMT releases Oracular Spectacular
  - Bon Iver releases For Emma, Forever Ago
  - Arctic Monkeys release Favourite Worst Nightmare
  - Panda Bear releases Person Pitch
  - The National release Boxer
  - Alcest releases Souvenirs d'un autre monde
  - M.I.A. releases Kala
  - Battles releases Mirrored
  - Justice release Cross
- 2006 in music, 2006 in British music, 2006 in Irish music, 2006 in Norwegian music, 2006 in South Korean music, 2006 in Swiss music
  - Jack Johnson's Sing-A-Longs and Lullabies for the Film Curious George to the Universal Studios' animated feature Curious George
  - System of a Down announces hiatus
  - Taylor Swift releases her debut album, Taylor Swift
  - Amy Winehouse releases Back to Black
  - My Chemical Romance release The Black Parade
  - Rihanna releases A Girl like Me
  - The Wiggles release Racing to the Rainbow
  - Evanescence releases The Open Door
  - J Dilla releases Donuts
  - Arctic Monkeys release Whatever People Say I Am, That's What I'm Not
  - Joanna Newsom releases Ys
  - Tool release 10,000 Days
  - Brand New release The Devil and God Are Raging Inside Me
  - Muse releases Black Holes and Revelations
  - Red Hot Chili Peppers release Stadium Arcadium
  - Deaths of James Brown and Syd Barrett.
- 2005 in music, 2005 in British music, 2005 in Irish music, 2005 in Norwegian music, 2005 in South Korean music, 2005 in Swiss music
  - After four years, Gorillaz release their second studio album, Demon Days.
  - Mariah Carey releases her 10-million selling The Emancipation of Mimi, the best-selling album of the year worldwide, alongside the album's second single "We Belong Together", the year's most successful single, and the Song of the Decade 2000–2009.
  - Death of Luther Vandross and John Herald.
  - Pink Floyd reunion for Live 8.
  - R. Kelly releases his opera series Trapped in the Closet.
  - Daft Punk release Human After All
  - They Might Be Giants release Here Come the ABCs
  - Boris release Pink
  - Boards of Canada release The Campfire Headphase
  - Venetian Snares release Rossz Csillag Alatt Született
  - Madonna releases Confessions on a Dance Floor, her 10th studio album. It wins a Grammy award, Brit award, sells in excess of 12 million copies and has the worldwide hit "Hung Up" which tops the charts in a record-breaking 41 countries.
  - Kanye West releases his album Late Registration
  - Musicals first performed:
    - Monty Python member Eric Idle releases the Monty Python musical Spamalot
    - Elton John's musical adaptation of the British drama film Billy Elliot, which features the song "Electricity"
    - Bob Gaudio's biopic Frankie Valli and the Four Seasons musical Jersey Boys
  - Debuts by:
    - Bullet for My Valentine's The Poison
- 2004 in music, 2004 in British music, 2004 in Irish music, 2004 in Norwegian music, 2004 in South Korean music
  - Death of Ray Charles, Rick James, Dimebag Darrell.
  - Danger Mouse releases The Grey Album, sparking days of electronic disobedience by Internet file sharers against EMI.
  - Green Day releases American Idiot to critical acclaim.
  - They Might Be Giants' The Spine
  - Madvillain's Madvillainy
  - MF Doom's Mm..Food
  - Animal Collective's Sung Tongs
  - Modest Mouse's Good News for People Who Love Bad News
  - Interpol's Antics
  - Mastodon's Leviathan
  - Björk's Medúlla
  - Eminem's Encore (Eminem album)
  - Canadian singer Celine Dion became recipient of the Diamond award, and she was honored in 2004 by World Music Awards receiving the best selling female artist of all time.
  - Debut by:
    - Kanye West's The College Dropout
    - The Go! Team's Thunder, Lightning, Strike
    - Arcade Fire's Funeral
    - Franz Ferdinand's self-titled album
  - Notable releases:
    - Moldovan pop band O-Zone release "Dragostea Din Tei", going on to become an Internet sensation.
- 2003 in music, 2003 in British music, 2003 in Irish music, 2003 in Norwegian music, 2003 in South Korean music
  - Death of Nina Simone, Celia Cruz, June Carter Cash, Johnny Cash, Herbie Mann, and John Serry Sr.
  - Debut by:
    - Beyoncé (Dangerously in Love)
    - 50 Cent (Get Rich or Die Tryin')
  - Notable releases:
    - Linkin Park's Meteora
    - Stephen Schwartz's musical Wicked
    - Outkast's Speakerboxxx/The Love Below
    - Robert Lopez and Jeff Marx's Avenue Q
    - The Wiggles' Go to Sleep Jeff!, Whoo Hoo! Wiggly Gremlins! & Top of the Tots
    - Evanescence's Fallen
    - The Black Eyed Peas' Elephunk
    - Radiohead's Hail to the Thief
    - Kraftwerk's Tour de France Soundtracks
    - The White Stripes' Elephant
    - Sleep's Jerusalem and Dopesmoker
    - Blink-182's self-titled album
    - Sweet Trip's Velocity : Design : Comfort
    - Explosions in the Sky's The Earth Is Not a Cold Dead Place
    - Boris's Boris at Last -Feedbacker-
    - MF Doom's Take Me to Your Leader
    - Nujabes' Metaphorical Music
    - Four Tet's Rounds
- 2002 in music, 2002 in British music, 2002 in Norwegian music, 2002 in South Korean music
  - Deaths of Waylon Jennings, Dave Van Ronk, Layne Staley, Lisa Left-Eye Lopes, Lonnie Donegan, John Entwistle and Joe Strummer.
  - Beginning of American Idol (initially titled American Idol: The Search for a Superstar) which brings the arrival of first winner Kelly Clarkson.
  - Alan Jackson releases Drive.
  - They Might Be Giants releases No!, the first album for families young & old.
  - Eminem releases The Eminem Show and "Lose Yourself" from his film 8 Mile, the first rap song of its kind to win an Academy Award for Best Original Song.
  - Justin Timberlake releases his debut album Justified.
  - Marc Shaiman's musical adaptation of the film Hairspray first performed.
  - Junior Senior release D-D-Don't Don't Stop the Beat.
  - Boards of Canada release Geogaddi
  - The Wiggles release Wiggly Safari
  - Godspeed You! Black Emperor releases Yanqui U.X.O..
  - Isis releases Oceanic (Isis album).
- 2001 in music, 2001 in British music, 2001 in Norwegian music, 2001 in South Korean music
  - Deaths of Mimi Fariña, Chet Atkins, Aaliyah, George Harrison, John Lee Hooker, John Phillips, Perry Como, Isaac Stern, and Chuck Schuldiner
  - Duran Duran is reunited with the original five members and goes on tour for the first time since 1985.
  - Michael Jackson's last studio album Invincible released.
  - Gorillaz' self-titled debut album is released.
  - Daft Punk releases Discovery
  - Kylie Minogue releases Fever
  - Comedy legend Mel Brooks' musical adaptation of his 1967 film The Producers first performed, starring Nathan Lane and Matthew Broderick.
  - Basement Jaxx release Rooty
  - Fennesz releases Endless Summer
  - The Strokes' debut album Is This It is released
  - Rammstein releases Mutter
  - The Wiggles release Hoop Dee Doo: It's a Wiggly Party
  - Opeth releases Blackwater Park
  - The Microphones releases The Glow Pt. 2
  - Muse releases Origin of Symmetry
  - System of a Down releases Toxicity
  - Björk releases Vespertine
  - Alicia Keys releases Songs in A Minor
  - They Might Be Giants releases Mink Car
  - Shakira releases Laundry Service
  - Manu Chao releases Próxima Estación: Esperanza
  - Tool release Lateralus
  - Cornelius release Point
  - Hikaru Utada releases Distance
  - Aphex Twin releases Drukqs
  - Stars of the Lid releases The Tired Sounds of Stars of the Lid
  - Autechre releases Confield
  - Napster's popularity peaks.
  - Metallica and Dr. Dre sue Napster over illegal distribution of their music.
  - Debuts by:
    - Avenged Sevenfold's Sounding the Seventh Trumpet
    - My Chemical Romance’s "I Brought You My Bullets, You Brought Me Your Love"
- 2000 in music, 2000 in British music, 2000 in Norwegian music, 2000 in South Korean music
  - Mariah Carey becomes the Best-Selling Artist of the Millennium according to the World Music Awards.
  - Britney Spears' Oops!... I Did It Again sells over 23 million copies and becomes the best-selling album by a female artist of the decade.
  - Blink-182 enjoy mainstream success (mainly from their hit single "All the Small Things") and lead pop-punk into the 21st Century.
  - Madonna releases her album Music, which goes on to sell 15 million copies, becomes universally acclaimed, and gets nominated for 5 Grammy awards. It follows her 1998 comeback Ray of Light.
  - Debuts by:
    - Linkin Park's Hybrid Theory
    - Coldplay's Parachutes
    - Craig David's Born to Do It
    - The Avalanches' Since I Left You
  - Notable releases
    - Eminem's The Marshall Mathers LP
    - Baha Men's Who Let the Dogs Out?
    - The Wiggles' It's a Wiggly Wiggly World, Wiggle Time and Yule Be Wiggling
    - Outkast's Stankonia
    - Ayumi Hamasaki's Duty
    - Mai Kuraki's Delicious Way
    - Ringo Sheena's Shōso Strip
    - Boris release Flood
    - Radiohead's Kid A
    - Godspeed You! Black Emperor's Lift Your Skinny Fists Like Antennas to Heaven
    - Vladislav Delay's Vocalcity
    - The Beatles's 1

=== List of 10 best-selling albums of the 2000s ===
1. The Beatles – 1 – 31 million – 2000
2. Norah Jones – Come Away with Me – 26 million – 2002
3. Backstreet Boys – Black & Blue – 24 million – 2000
4. Linkin Park – Hybrid Theory – 24 million – 2000
5. Britney Spears – Oops!... I Did It Again – 20 million – 2000
6. Usher – Confessions – 20 million – 2004
7. Eminem – The Eminem Show – 19 million – 2002
8. Eminem – The Marshall Mathers LP – 19 million – 2000
9. Avril Lavigne – Let Go – 17 million – 2002
10. Evanescence – Fallen – 17 million – 2003

== 1990s ==
- 1999 in music, 1999 in British music, 1999 in Norwegian music, 1999 in South Korean music
  - Arrival of Britney Spears, Coldplay, Jenni Rivera, Christina Aguilera, Jessica Simpson, Slipknot, Muse and Jennifer Lopez.
  - Deaths of Barış Manço, Rick Danko, Scatman John and Curtis Mayfield.
  - Notable releases:
    - Dr. Dre's 2001
    - Moby's Play
    - Sigur Rós' Ágætis byrjun
    - Santana' Supernatural
    - The Flaming Lips' The Soft Bulletin
    - Red Hot Chili Peppers's Californication
    - MF Doom's Operation: Doomsday
    - Eminem's The Slim Shady LP
    - The Dismemberment Plan's Emergency & I
    - Nine Inch Nails' The Fragile
    - Rage Against the Machine's The Battle of Los Angeles
    - Opeth's Still Life
    - The Aquabats' The Aquabats vs. the Floating Eye of Death
    - Mos Def's Black on Both Sides
    - Fiona Apple's When the Pawn...
    - Mr. Bungle's California
    - Blur's 13
    - Built to Spill's Keep It Like a Secret
    - Dream Theater's Metropolis Pt. 2: Scenes from a Memory
    - The Magnetic Fields' 69 Love Songs
    - The Roots's Things Fall Apart
    - Wilco's Summerteeth
    - Blink-182's Enema of the State
    - American Football's first self-titled album
    - Fatboy Slim's You've Come a Long Way, Baby
    - Lynda Thomas' Mi Día de la Independencia
    - Jamiroquai's Synkronized
    - Backstreet Boys' Millennium
    - Christina Aguilera' self-titled debut album
    - Lou Bega's Mambo No. 5
    - Ricky Martin's Livin' la Vida Loca
    - Eiffel 65's Europop
    - Hikaru Utada's First Love
    - Boredoms' Vision Creation Newsun
    - Darude' Before the Storm
    - Mogwai's Come On Die Young
    - Burzum's Hliðskjálf
    - Mr. Oizo's Analog Worms Attack
    - Susumu Yokota's Sakura
    - Trey Parker and Marc Shaiman's soundtrack to the Comedy Central animated film South Park: Bigger, Longer & Uncut
  - Benny Andersson and Björn Ulvaeus's ABBA musical Mamma Mia! first performed.
- 1998 in music, 1998 in British music, 1998 in Norwegian music, 1998 in South Korean music
  - Deaths of:
    - Frank Sinatra
    - Hide
    - Linda McCartney
  - Lauryn Hill releases The Miseducation of Lauryn Hill.
  - Neutral Milk Hotel releases In the Aeroplane Over the Sea.
  - The Offspring releases Americana.
  - "I Don't Want to Miss a Thing" by Aerosmith, from the Michael Bay film Armageddon, becomes the first song by a rock band to debut at No. 1.
  - Insane Clown Posse gets dropped from the Walt Disney Company's record label Hollywood Records after the release of The Great Milenko, in order for Disney to prevent a violent Southern Baptist Church protest due to Walt Disney World's Gay Days events.
  - Madonna releases her seventh studio album Ray of Light which goes on to sell over 16 million copies, become universally acclaimed and win 4 Grammy Awards.
  - Robbie Williams releases I've Been Expecting You
  - Lauryn Hill releases The Miseducation of Lauryn Hill
  - Boris release Amplifier Worship
  - Massive Attack release Mezzanine
  - System of a Down release their self-titled debut album
  - The Wiggles release Toot Toot!
  - Outkast release Aquemini
  - Duster release Stratosphere
  - Elliott Smith releaseS XO
  - Refused release The Shape of Punk to Come
  - Queens of the Stone Age release self-titled debut album
  - Belle and Sebastian release The Boy with the Arab Strap
  - Black Star release Mos Def & Talib Kweli Are Black Star
  - The Smashing Pumpkins release Adore
  - Pearl Jam release Yield
  - Gorguts release Obscura
  - Air release Moon Safari
  - Boards of Canada release Music Has the Right to Children
  - Tortoise release TNT
  - Autechre releases LP5
  - Don Caballero releases What Burns Never Returns
  - Amon Tobin releases Permutation
  - Dirty Three release Ocean Songs
  - Gas releases Zauberberg and Königsforst
  - Andrea Bocelli and Celine Dion release "The Prayer" from the animated Warner Bros. film Quest for Camelot
  - Geri Halliwell leaves the Spice Girls
  - Death releases their final album The Sound of Perseverance.
- 1997 in music, 1997 in British music, 1997 in Norwegian music, 1997 in South Korean music
  - Debuts of Backstreet Boys and Robbie Williams (after leaving Take That)
  - Death of John Denver, Jeff Buckley, Townes Van Zandt, The Notorious B.I.G., Michael Hutchence, Fela Kuti, and Velvet.
  - Notable releases:
    - Lynn Ahrens, Stephen Flaherty, and David Newman's soundtrack to the animated feature film Anastasia.
    - Radiohead's OK Computer
    - Björk's Homogenic
    - Janet Jackson's The Velvet Rope
    - The Wiggles' The Wiggles Movie Soundtrack
    - Mariah Carey's #1's, selling 17 million copies.
    - Blur release the single "Song 2" to a chart-topping success.
    - Celine Dion's Let's Talk About Love, which sold over 31 million copies worldwide. Lead single "My Heart Will Go On", from the James Cameron film Titanic, became the best selling single of the year and the second best selling single by a female artist of all time.
    - Spice Girls' Spiceworld
    - Elton John and Tim Rice's musical version of the Disney Animation film The Lion King
    - The Verve's Urban Hymns
    - Shania Twain's Come On Over
    - Elliott Smith's Either/Or
    - Modest Mouse's The Lonesome Crowded West
    - The Aquabats' The Fury of the Aquabats!
    - Spiritualized's Ladies and Gentlemen We Are Floating in Space
    - Portishead's self-titled debut album
    - Yo La Tengo's I Can Hear the Heart Beating as One
    - Built to Spill's Perfect from Now On
    - Ween's The Mollusk
    - Deftones' Around the Fur
    - The Prodigy's The Fat of the Land
    - Metallica's Reload
    - Blur's self-titled album
    - Foo Fighters' The Colour and the Shape
    - The Notorious B.I.G.'s Life After Death
    - Aqua's Aquarium
    - Stereolab's Dots and Loops
    - Buena Vista Social Club's self-titled debut album
    - Daft Punk's Homework
    - Godspeed You! Black Emperor's F♯ A♯ ∞
    - Mogwai's Mogwai Young Team
    - The Chemical Brothers' Dig Your Own Hole
    - Biosphere's Substrata
    - Squarepusher's Hard Normal Daddy
    - Autechre's Chiastic Slide
    - Amon Tobin's Bricolage
    - Christoph de Babalon's If You're Into It, I'm Out of It
    - Fishmans' Uchū Nippon Setagaya
    - Fantastic Plastic Machine's self-titled debut album
    - Cornelius' Fantasma
- 1996 in music, 1996 in British music, 1996 in Norwegian music, 1996 in South Korean music
  - Death of Ella Fitzgerald, Tupac Shakur, Zeki Müren and Brad Nowell.
  - Arrival of Lynda Thomas, Spice Girls.
  - Guns N' Roses break up, later reuniting for 2008's Chinese Democracy.
  - Pink Floyd disband.
  - Celine Dion released the album Falling into You, selling over 32 million copies worldwide.
  - Max Cavalera leaves Sepultura, later going on to form Soulfly.
  - Notable releases:
    - Sepultura's Roots
    - Jonathan Larson's Rent
    - Jamiroquai's Travelling Without Moving
    - Spice Girls' Spice
    - DJ Shadow's Endtroducing.....
    - Weezer's Pinkerton
    - Fishmans' Long Season
    - Tool's Ænima
    - Aphex Twin's Richard D. James Album
    - Tupac Shakur's All Eyez on Me
    - Soundgarden's Down on the Upside
    - The Wiggles' Wake Up Jeff! and Wiggly, Wiggly Christmas
    - Belle and Sebastian's If You're Feeling Sinister
    - Swans' Soundtracks for the Blind
    - Burzum's Filosofem
    - Beck's Odelay
    - Outkast ATLiens
    - Metallica's Load
    - Tortoise's Millions Now Living Will Never Die
    - Toshinori Kondo and DJ Krush's Ki-Oku
  - Debut album:
    - Supergrass's I Should Coco
    - Neutral Milk Hotel's On Avery Island
    - Jay-Z Reasonable Doubt
    - Robert Miles's Dreamland
- 1995 in music, 1995 in British music, 1995 in Norwegian music, 1995 in South Korean music
  - A year after the 1994 Eurovision Song Contest interval performance, Irish dance show Riverdance debuts.
  - Michael Jackson releases HIStory: Past, Present and Future, Book I, the best-selling multi-disc album of all time. This double album contains "You Are Not Alone" – the first single ever to enter the Billboard Hot 100 at number one.
  - Death of Jerry Garcia, Dean Martin, Phyllis Hyman, Selena, Burl Ives, and Eazy-E.
  - Mariah Carey becomes the first female artist in history to have a song debut at number one with Fantasy.
  - Coolio and L.V. release the award-winning single "Gangsta's Paradise" from the film Dangerous Minds
  - Mariah Carey and band Boyz II Men releases the multiple-record holding "One Sweet Day", the single with the most weeks at number and the Song of the Decade 1990–1999.
  - Italian tenor Andrea Bocelli first performs and releases the acclaimed opera song "Con te partirò".
  - Italian DJ Robert Miles releases his debut single "Children" to universal acclaim.
  - Los del Río release "Macarena", the record breaking dance song of all time.
  - Queen releases their final album Made in Heaven following the death of frontman Freddie Mercury.
  - Notable releases:
    - Death's Symbolic
    - The Smashing Pumpkins' Mellon Collie and the Infinite Sadness
    - Radiohead's The Bends
    - Björk's Post
    - Oasis' (What's the Story) Morning Glory?
    - The Wiggles' Big Red Car
    - GZA's Liquid Swords
    - Death's Symbolic
    - Elliott Smith's self-titled album
    - Mobb Deep's The Infamous Mobb Deep
    - Pulp's Different Class
    - Swans' The Great Annihilator
    - Ulver's Bergtatt – Et eeventyr i 5 capitler
    - PJ Harvey's To Bring You My Love
    - Scatman John's Scatman's World
    - Pavement's Wowee Zowee
    - Raekwon's Only Built 4 Cuban Linx...
    - The Chemical Brothers' Exit Planet Dust
    - Sonic Youth's Washing Machine
    - David Bowie's Outside
    - Alice in Chains' self-titled album
    - Dissection's Storm of the Light's Bane
    - The Aquabats' The Return of the Aquabats
    - Blur's The Great Escape
    - Three 6 Mafia's Mystic Stylez
    - Tupac Shakur's Me Against the World
    - Aphex Twin's ...I Care Because You Do
    - Autechre's Tri Repetae
    - Slowdive's Pygmalion
    - Oval's 94 Diskont
    - Porcupine Tree's The Sky Moves Sideways
    - Hallucinogen's Twisted
- 1994 in music, 1994 in British music, 1994 in Norwegian music
  - Deaths of:
    - Dinah Shore
    - Kurt Cobain
  - Debuts by:
    - Oasis (Definitely Maybe)
    - Weezer (The Blue Album)
    - Brandy (Brandy)
    - Nas (Illmatic)
    - The Notorious B.I.G. (Ready to Die)
    - Portishead (Dummy)
    - Sunny Day Real Estate (Diary)
  - Other albums released:
    - Pink Floyd's The Division Bell, their last album until 2014's The Endless River.
    - Madonna's Bedtime Stories
    - Blur's Parklife
    - Green Day's major-label debut, Dookie, with the hits "Longview", "Welcome to Paradise", "Basket Case", "When I Come Around" and "She".
    - The Offspring's Smash
    - Common's Resurrection
    - Soundgarden's Superunknown
    - R.E.M.'s Monster
    - NOFX's Punk in Drublic
    - The Wiggles' Yummy Yummy
    - Jeff Buckley's Grace
    - Aphex Twin's Selected Ambient Works Volume II
    - Global Communication's 76:14
    - Nine Inch Nails' The Downward Spiral
    - Nirvana's live album MTV Unplugged in New York
    - Alice in Chains' Jar of Flies
    - Bad Religion's Stranger Than Fiction. With this album, the band earned their first (and only) US gold record in its 15-year career.
    - Mariah Carey's Merry Christmas, with its multi-platinum lead single "All I Want for Christmas Is You", which eventually becomes the nineteenth best-selling digital single of the 20th century.
    - Beck's major-label debut, Mellow Gold.
    - The Prodigy's Music for the Jilted Generation.
- 1993 in music, 1993 in British music, 1993 in Norwegian music
  - Debuts by:
    - Cynic (Focus)
    - Rancid (Rancid)
    - Snoop Doggy Dogg (Doggystyle)
    - Tool (Undertow)
    - Wu-Tang Clan (Enter the Wu-Tang)
    - Radiohead (Pablo Honey)
    - Björk (Debut)
    - Autechre (Incunabula)
    - Earth (Earth 2)
    - Seefeel (Quique)
  - Nirvana release their final album, titled In Utero.
  - Birth of Ariana Grande
  - Deaths of Frank Zappa, Marian Anderson, and Dizzy Gillespie.
  - Mariah Carey releases her 32-million selling Music Box album.
  - Bad Religion signs to Atlantic Records, where the band later achieves success.
  - Other albums released:
    - Death's Individual Thought Patterns
    - Duran Duran's The Wedding Album
    - Morbid Angel's Covenant
    - The Wiggles' Stories and Songs: The Adventures of Captain Feathersword the Friendly Pirate
    - Pestilence's Spheres
    - Sepultura's Chaos A.D.
    - Sting's Ten Summoner's Tales
    - Slowdive's Souvlaki
    - The Smashing Pumpkins' Siamese Dream
    - A Tribe Called Quest's Midnight Marauders
    - Tupac Shakur's Strictly 4 My N.I.G.G.A.Z...
    - Ice Cube's The Predator
    - Pearl Jam's Vs.
    - Meat Loaf's Bat Out of Hell II: Back into Hell
    - Orbital's Orbital
- 1992 in music, 1992 in British music, 1992 in Norwegian music, 1992 in South Korean music
  - Debuts by:
    - Body Count (Body Count)
    - Aphex Twin (Selected Ambient Works 85–92)
    - Dr. Dre (The Chronic)
    - The Future Sound of London (Accelerator)
    - Pavement (Slanted and Enchanted)
    - Rage Against the Machine (Rage Against the Machine)
    - Stone Temple Pilots (Core)
    - Sublime (40oz. to Freedom)
    - Therapy? (Nurse)
    - Red House Painters (Down Colorful Hill)
    - Ugly Kid Joe (America's Least Wanted)
    - Tori Amos (Little Earthquakes)
  - Death of John Cage and Yutaka Ozaki.
  - U2 start the Zoo TV Tour
  - Freddie Mercury Tribute Concert
  - Birth of Selena Gomez
  - Other releases:
    - R.E.M.'s Automatic for the People
    - Alice in Chains' Dirt
    - Sonic Youth's Dirty
    - Dream Theater's Images and Words
    - Pantera's Vulgar Display of Power
    - Tom Waits' Bone Machine
    - Darkthrone's A Blaze in the Northern Sky
    - Megadeth's Countdown to Extinction
    - The Wiggles' Here Comes a Song
    - Kyuss' Blues for the Red Sun
    - The Cure's Wish
    - Sade's Love Deluxe
    - Beastie Boys' Check Your Head
    - The Orb's U.F.Orb
    - Madonna's sexually-provocative book Sex, which was accompanied by the double-platinum album Erotica. It becomes one of the most controversial books and albums ever released, but enjoys commercial success. From it, Madonna made $500 million for her label.
    - The soundtrack to the film The Bodyguard, the best selling soundtrack album of all time, selling over 45 million copies worldwide to date. Its leading single "I Will Always Love You" became the best selling single by a female artist (Whitney Houston) of all time, selling over 15 million copies.
    - Faith No More's Angel Dust
    - Obituary's The End Complete
    - Artificial Intelligence, Warp's compilation album by various artists is released.
    - Japanese pop band Dreams Come True release their album The Swinging Star, whose track Sweet Sweet Sweet originated as the ending theme of the Sega Genesis video game Sonic the Hedgehog 2, for which Masato Nakamura composed the music.
- 1991 in music, 1991 in British music, 1991 in Norwegian music
  - Debut albums by:
    - Blur (Leisure)
    - Cypress Hill (Cypress Hill)
    - EMF (Schubert Dip)
    - The Infectious Grooves (The Plague That Makes Your Booty Move...It's the Infectious Grooves)
    - Kyuss (Wretch)
    - The Wiggles (self-titled album)
    - Pearl Jam (Ten)
    - The Smashing Pumpkins (Gish)
    - Beck (Golden Feelings)
    - Tupac Shakur (2Pacalypse Now)
    - Massive Attack (Blue Lines)
    - LFO (Frequencies)
    - The Orb (The Orb's Adventures Beyond the Ultraworld)
    - Orbital (Orbital)
    - Electronic (Electronic)
    - Biosphere (Microgravity)
    - Nightmares on Wax (A Word of Science: The First and Final Chapter)
  - Arrival of Blue Man Group
  - Death of Miles Davis, Freddie Mercury, Eric Carr, Steve Clark.
  - Rapper NF is born
  - Notable releases:
    - Death's Human
    - Michael Jackson's Dangerous
    - Metallica's Metallica
    - Morbid Angel's Blessed Are the Sick
    - Andrew Lloyd Webber's musical adaptation of the 1950 film Sunset Boulevard
    - Enya's Shepherd Moons
    - Nirvana's Nevermind
    - Bryan Adams's "(Everything I Do) I Do It For You" from the film Robin Hood: Prince of Thieves
    - Pestilence's Testimony of the Ancients
    - Sepultura's Arise
    - U2's Achtung Baby
    - The KLF's The White Room
    - 808 State's ex:el
    - Kraftwerk's The Mix
    - Ultramarine's Every Man and Woman Is a Star
    - Primal Scream's Screamadelica
    - Red Hot Chili Pepper's Blood Sugar Sex Magik
    - Sonny Sharrock's Ask the Ages
  - Mariah Carey wins the Grammy Award for Best New Artist. Mariah Carey becomes the only artist in history to have their first 5 consecutive singles reach number one in the United States.
- 1990 in music, 1990 in British music, 1990 in Japanese music, 1990 in Norwegian music
  - Debut albums by Alice in Chains (Facelift), Cannibal Corpse (Eaten Back to Life), Mariah Carey (Mariah Carey), Deee-Lite (World Clique), Green Day (39/Smooth), Helmet (Strap It On), Ice Cube (AmeriKKKa's Most Wanted), Primus (Frizzle Fry), Ride (Nowhere) and A Tribe Called Quest (People's Instinctive Travels and the Paths of Rhythm) are released.
  - Death of Sarah Vaughan, Leonard Bernstein, Luigi Nono, Johnnie Ray, and Sammy Davis Jr.
  - Milli Vanilli becomes exposed as a music fraud.
  - The Three Tenors (consisting of Plácido Domingo, José Carreras and Luciano Pavarotti) perform their first concert at the Baths of Caracalla in Rome, with a recording of the concert turned into Carreras Domingo Pavarotti in Concert, becoming the fastest-selling classical album of all time.
  - Notable releases:
    - Slayer's Seasons in the Abyss
    - Obituary's Cause of Death
    - Pantera's Cowboys from Hell
    - Megadeth's Rust in Peace
    - Judas Priest's Painkiller
    - Depeche Mode's Violator
    - Cocteau Twins's Heaven or Las Vegas
    - Sonic Youth's Goo
    - Fugazi's Repeater
    - Ride's Nowhere
    - Pixies' Bossanova
    - Sinéad O'Connor' I Do Not Want What I Haven't Got

=== List of 10 best-selling albums of the 1990s ===
1. Whitney Houston / Various artists – The Bodyguard – 45 million – 1992
2. Shania Twain – Come on Over – 40 million – 1997
3. Alanis Morissette – Jagged Little Pill – 33 million – 1995
4. Mariah Carey – Music Box – 32 million – 1993
5. Celine Dion – Falling into You – 32 million – 1996
6. Michael Jackson – Dangerous – 32 million – 1991
7. Celine Dion – Let's Talk About Love – 31 million – 1997
8. Madonna – The Immaculate Collection – 30 million – 1990
9. Britney Spears – ...Baby One More Time – 30 million – 1999
10. Backstreet Boys – Millennium – 30 million – 1999

== 1980s ==
- 1989 in music, 1989 in British music, 1989 in Japanese music, 1989 in Norwegian music
  - Notable events:
    - The swing revival is agreed upon to have started around 1989.
    - The musical Miss Saigon first performed
  - Deaths of:
    - Herbert von Karajan
    - Irving Berlin
    - Vladimir Horowitz
  - Notable releases:
    - 3rd Bass – The Cactus Album (Debut)
    - De La Soul – 3 Feet High and Rising (Debut)
    - The D.O.C. – No One Can Do It Better (Debut)
    - Morbid Angel – Altars of Madness (Debut)
    - N.W.A – Straight Outta Compton (Debut)
    - Nine Inch Nails – Pretty Hate Machine (Debut)
    - Nirvana – Bleach (Debut)
    - Obituary – Slowly We Rot (Debut)
    - The Offspring – The Offspring (Debut)
    - The Stone Roses – The Stone Roses (Debut):
    - Janet Jackson – Rhythm Nation 1814
    - Madonna – Like A Prayer
    - Mötley Crüe – Dr. Feelgood
    - Fine Young Cannibals – The Raw & the Cooked
    - Pestilence – Consuming Impulse
    - Sepultura – Beneath the Remains
    - Phil Collins – ...But Seriously
    - Kate Bush – The Sensual World
    - 808 State – 90
    - "Weird Al" Yankovic – soundtrack to the film UHF
- 1988 in music, 1988 in British music, 1988 in Japanese music, 1988 in Norwegian music
  - Notable events:
  - Deaths of:
    - Roy Orbison
    - Andy Gibb
    - Gil Evans
    - Chet Baker
  - Notable releases:
    - Biz Markie – Goin' Off (Debut)
    - Tracy Chapman – Tracy Chapman (Debut)
    - Danzig – Danzig (Debut)
    - Eazy-E – Eazy-Duz-It (Debut)
    - EPMD – Strictly Business (Debut)
    - Jane's Addiction – Nothing's Shocking (Debut)
    - Living Colour – Vivid (Debut)
    - Morrissey – Viva Hate (Debut)
    - They Might Be Giants – Lincoln
    - NOFX – Liberal Animation (Debut)
    - Pestilence – Malleus Maleficarum (Debut)
    - The Pixies – Surfer Rosa (Debut)
    - Soundgarden – Ultramega OK (Debut)
    - Bon Jovi – New Jersey
    - Bad Religion – Suffer
    - Enya – Watermark
    - Bathory – Blood Fire Death
    - Steve Roach – Dreamtime Return
    - Nurse with Wound – Soliloquy for Lilith
    - Kino – Gruppa krovi
    - Whitney Houston – "Where Do Broken Hearts Go"
- 1987 in music, 1987 in British music, 1987 in Japanese music, 1987 in Norwegian music
  - Notable events:
  - Deaths of:
    - John H. Hammond
    - Liberace
    - Buddy Rich
    - Andres Segovia
    - Fred Astaire
    - Jackie Gleason
    - Jaco Pastorius
  - Notable releases:
    - Anthrax – Among the Living
    - Michael Jackson – Bad
    - Whitney Houston – Whitney
    - Sepultura – Schizophrenia
    - Def Leppard – Hysteria
    - U2 – The Joshua Tree
    - Joe Satriani – Surfing with the Alien
    - The Beastie Boys – Licensed to Ill (Debut)
    - Death – Scream Bloody Gore (Debut)
    - Guns N' Roses – Appetite for Destruction (Debut)
    - Testament – The Legacy (Debut)
    - Rick Astley – Whenever You Need Somebody (Debut)
- 1986 in music, 1986 in British music, 1986 in Japanese music, 1986 in Norwegian music
  - Notable events:
    - The musical The Phantom of the Opera first performed
    - Aerosmith re-records "Walk This Way" with rap group Run-D.M.C.
  - Deaths of:
    - Benny Goodman
    - Harold Arlen
    - Richard Manuel
    - Cliff Burton
    - Phil Lynott
  - Notable releases:
    - Sepultura – Morbid Visions (Debut)
    - Bon Jovi – Slippery When Wet
    - Metallica – Master of Puppets
    - Megadeth – Peace Sells... But Who's Buying
    - Slayer – Reign in Blood
    - Peter Gabriel – So
    - Huey Lewis and the News - Fore!
    - Europe – The Final Countdown
    - The Smiths – The Queen Is Dead
    - Sonic Youth – Evol
    - Beastie Boys – Licensed to Ill
    - They Might Be Giants – self-titled album
    - Iron Maiden – Somewhere in Time
    - Big Black – Atomizer
    - The soundtrack album to the film Top Gun is released.
    - Paul Simon – Graceland
    - Kraftwerk – Electric Café
    - Genesis – Invisible Touch
    - Janet Jackson – Control
    - John Farnham – Whispering Jack
    - Hiroshi Yoshimura – Green
    - Madonna – True Blue
- 1985 in music, 1985 in British music, 1985 in Japanese music, 1985 in Norwegian music
  - Notable events:
    - The musical Les Misérables first performed
    - Live Aid and Farm Aid benefit concerts take place.
  - Deaths of:
    - Ricky Nelson
  - Notable releases:
    - Exodus – Bonded by Blood (Debut)
    - Whitney Houston – Whitney Houston (Debut)
    - Megadeth – Killing Is My Business... and Business Is Good! (Debut)
    - Overkill – Feel the Fire (Debut)
    - A-ha – Hunting High and Low (Debut)
    - Phil Collins – No Jacket Required
    - Dead or Alive – Youthquake (including "You Spin Me Right Round")
    - Falco – "Rock Me Amadeus"
    - Slayer – Hell Awaits
    - Tears for Fears – Songs from the Big Chair
    - Billy Joel – Greatest Hits – Volume I & Volume II
- 1984 in music, 1984 in British music, 1984 in Japanese music, 1984 in Norwegian music
  - Notable events:
    - Band Aid is formed to perform "Do They Know It's Christmas?"
    - The Opera Akhnaten by Philip Glass premieres in Stuttgart
    - The musical Sunday in the Park with George first performed
    - The musical Starlight Express first performed
    - Duran Duran utilize a monitor in concert to project their performance
  - Deaths of:
    - Marvin Gaye
    - Jackie Wilson
    - Count Basie
  - Notable releases:
    - The Bob Marley & The Wailers – Legend
    - Madonna – Like A Virgin
    - Mercyful Fate – Don't Break the Oath
    - Metallica – Ride the Lightning
    - Prince – Purple Rain
    - Tina Turner – Private Dancer
    - Van Halen – 1984
    - Red Hot Chili Peppers – self-titled debut album
    - Bruce Springsteen – Born in the U.S.A.
    - Hüsker Dü – Zen Arcade
    - Manuel Göttsching – E2-E4
    - Yngwie Malmsteen – Rising Force (Debut)
    - Mariya Takeuchi – Variety
    - Tatsuro Yamashita – soundtrack to the Japanese film Big Wave
    - Anthrax – Fistful of Metal (Debut)
    - Bathory – self-titled (Debut)
    - Bon Jovi – self-titled (Debut)
    - Celtic Frost – Morbid Tales (Debut)
    - Metal Church - self-titled (Debut)
    - Ratt – Out of the Cellar (Debut)
    - Voivod – War and Pain (Debut)
    - W.A.S.P. – self-titled (Debut)
- 1983 in music, 1983 in British music, 1983 in Japanese music, 1983 in Norwegian music
  - Notable events:
    - The musical Blood Brothers first performed
  - Deaths of:
    - Muddy Waters
    - Karen Carpenter
    - Pete Farndon
    - Harry James
    - Ira Gershwin
  - Notable releases:
    - Accept – Balls to the Wall
    - Def Leppard – Pyromania
    - Iron Maiden – Piece of Mind
    - David Bowie – Let's Dance
    - Mötley Crüe – Shout at the Devil
    - New Order – Power, Corruption & Lies & Blue Monday
    - Ozzy Osbourne – Bark at the Moon
    - The Police – Synchronicity
    - ZZ Top – Eliminator
    - U2 – War
    - Cocteau Twins – Head over Heels
    - Pink Floyd – The Final Cut
    - Brian Eno – Apollo: Atmospheres and Soundtracks
    - Asia – Alpha
    - Quiet Riot – Metal Health
    - D.R.I. – Dirty Rotten EP/LP (Debut)
    - Dio – Holy Diver (Debut)
    - Huey Lewis and the News - Sports
    - Dokken – Breaking the Chains (Debut)
    - Cyndi Lauper – She's So Unusual (Debut)
    - Madonna – Madonna (Debut)
    - Mercyful Fate – Melissa (Debut)
    - Metallica – Kill 'Em All (Debut)
    - Pantera – Metal Magic (Debut)
    - Queensrÿche – self-titled EP (Debut)
    - R.E.M. – Murmur (Debut)
    - Slayer – Show No Mercy (Debut)
    - Sonic Youth – Confusion Is Sex (Debut)
    - Suicidal Tendencies – self-titled (Debut)
    - Tears for Fears – The Hurting (Debut)
    - Wham! – Fantastic (Debut)
    - Stevie Ray Vaughan – Texas Flood (Debut)
    - "Weird Al" Yankovic – self-titled (Debut)
    - Irene Cara – Flashdance... What a Feeling
- 1982 in music, 1982 in British music, 1982 in Japanese music, 1982 in Norwegian music
  - Notable events:
    - The compact disc is introduced.
    - The musical Little Shop of Horrors first performed
  - Deaths of:
    - Thelonious Monk
    - Lightnin' Hopkins
    - John Belushi
    - Glenn Gould
    - Artur Rubinstein
    - Randy Rhoads
  - Notable releases:
    - Accept – Restless and Wild
    - Phil Collins – Hello, I Must Be Going!
    - Duran Duran – Rio
    - Huey Lewis and the News - Picture This
    - INXS – Shabooh Shoobah
    - Asia – Asia (Debut)
    - Descendents – Milo Goes to College (Debut)
    - Iron Maiden – The Number of the Beast
    - Judas Priest – Screaming for Vengeance
    - Michael Jackson – Thriller
    - Toto – Toto IV
    - The Cure – Pornography
    - Kate Bush – The Dreaming
    - Bruce Springsteen – Nebraska
    - Akina Nakamori – Variation (Hensoukyoku)
    - Bad Brains – Bad Brains
    - The Clash – Combat Rock
    - Roxy Music – Avalon
    - Rush – Signals
    - Venom – Black Metal
    - Prince – 1999
    - Tatsuro Yamashita – For You
    - Survivor – Eye of the Tiger
- 1981 in music, 1981 in British music, 1981 in Japanese music, 1981 in Norwegian music
  - Notable events:
    - MTV first airs
    - The musical Cats first performed
    - The musical Dreamgirls first performed
  - Deaths of:
    - Bob Marley
    - David Lynch
    - Bill Haley
  - Notable releases:
    - Phil Collins – Face Value (Debut)
    - Duran Duran – self-titled (Debut)
    - Mötley Crüe – Too Fast for Love (Debut)
    - Venom – Welcome to Hell (Debut)
    - Depeche Mode – Speak & Spell (Debut)
    - Genesis – Abacab
    - Queen – Greatest Hits
    - Rush – Moving Pictures
    - The Human League – Dare
    - The Police – Ghost in the Machine
    - Grace Jones – Nightclubbing
    - Electric Light Orchestra – Time
    - Brian Eno and David Byrne – My Life in the Bush of Ghosts
    - Glenn Branca – The Ascension
    - Jean-Michel Jarre – Les Chants Magnétiques
    - Kraftwerk – Computer World
    - Yellow Magic Orchestra – BGM & Technodelic
    - Eiichi Ohtaki – A Long Vacation
- 1980 in music, 1980 in British music, 1980 in Japanese music, 1980 in Norwegian music
  - Notable events:
    - The musical 42nd Street first performance
  - Deaths of:
    - Bill Evans
    - Ian Curtis
    - Bon Scott
    - John Lennon
    - John Bonham
    - Tim Hardin
    - Vinicius de Moraes
  - Notable releases:
    - U2 – Boy (Debut)
    - Bryan Adams – self-titled (Debut)
    - Huey Lewis and the News - self-titled (Debut)
    - Iron Maiden – self-titled (Debut)
    - Sheena Easton – Take My Time (Debut)
    - Bauhaus – In the Flat Field (Debut)
    - AC/DC – Back in Black
    - Joy Division – Closer
    - Dead Kennedys – Fresh Fruit for Rotting Vegetables
    - The Cure – Seventeen Seconds
    - Black Sabbath – Heaven and Hell
    - Queen – The Game
    - Dead Kennedys – Fresh Fruit for Rotting Vegetables
    - Kate Bush – Never for Ever
    - Judas Priest – British Steel
    - The Feelies – Crazy Rhythms
    - Motörhead – Ace of Spades
    - David Bowie – Scary Monsters (and Super Creeps)
    - Rush – Permanent Waves
    - Talking Heads' Remain in Light
    - Swell Maps – Jane from Occupied Europe
    - Tatsuro Yamashita – Ride on Time

== 1970s ==
- 1979 in music, 1979 in British music, 1979 in Japanese music, 1979 in Norwegian music
  - Notable events:
    - The Sony Walkman goes on sale
    - The musical Sweeney Todd: The Demon Barber of Fleet Street first performed
  - Deaths of:
    - Van McCoy
    - Richard Rodgers
    - Charles Mingus
    - Donny Hathaway
    - Sid Vicious
    - Minnie Ripperton
    - Nadia Boulanger
    - Stan Kenton
  - Notable releases:
    - The Clash – London Calling
    - Pink Floyd – The Wall
    - Earth, Wind & Fire – I Am
    - Sister Sledge – We Are Family
    - Michael Jackson – Off the Wall
    - Donna Summer – Bad Girls
    - Anita Ward – "Ring My Bell"
    - Public Image Ltd. – Metal Box
    - The Buggles - The Age of Plastic
    - Elvis Costello – Armed Forces
    - AC/DC – Highway to Hell
    - David Bowie – Lodger
    - Wire – 154
    - Led Zeppelin – In Through the Out Door
    - Supertramp – Breakfast in America
    - ABBA – Voulez-Vous
    - The B-52's – self-titled debut album
    - Motörhead – Overkill and Bomber
    - Electric Light Orchestra – Discovery
    - Van Halen – Van Halen II
    - Joy Division – Unknown Pleasures
    - Talking Heads – Fear of Music
    - Gang of Four – Entertainment!
    - Scorpions – Lovedrive
    - Yellow Magic Orchestra – Solid State Survivor
    - Casiopea – self-titled debut album
    - Univers Zero – Heresie
    - Sugarhill Gang – "Rapper's Delight" (often noted as the official birth of rap music)
- 1978 in music, 1978 in British music, 1978 in Japanese music, 1978 in Norwegian music
  - Deaths of:
    - Keith Moon
    - Ray Noble
    - Joe Venuti
    - Louis Prima
    - Don Ellis
    - Jacques Brel
  - Notable releases:
    - The Who – Who Are You
    - Kate Bush – The Kick Inside
    - Gloria Gaynor – Love Tracks (including her No. 1 hit single "I Will Survive").
    - Blondie – Parallel Lines
    - Funkadelic – One Nation Under a Groove
    - Jeff Wayne's Musical Version of The War of the Worlds
    - Devo – Q. Are We Not Men? A: We Are Devo!
    - Queen – Jazz
    - Talking Heads – More Songs About Buildings and Food
    - Chic – C'est Chic
    - Olivia Newton-John and John Travolta – soundtrack album to the musical film Grease
    - Brian Eno – Ambient 1: Music for Airports
    - Jean-Michel Jarre – Equinoxe
    - Klaus Schulze – X
    - Kraftwerk – The Man-Machine
    - Boney M. – Nightflight to Venus
    - Haruomi Hosono and Yellow Magic Band – Paraiso
    - Prince – For You
    - Van Halen – Van Halen (Debut)
    - Dire Straits – Dire Straits
    - Public Image Ltd. – Public Image: First Issue
    - The Blues Brothers – Briefcase Full of Blues
    - The Police – Outlandos d'Amour
    - Ryuichi Sakamoto – Thousand Knives
    - Yellow Magic Orchestra – Yellow Magic Orchestra
    - Haruomi Hosono, Shigeru Suzuki, and Tatsuro Yamashita's Pacific, the Omnibus album which contains a prototype version of Hosono's famous track Cosmic Surfin' that would later be upgraded in YMO's debut album the same year.
- 1977 in music, 1977 in British music, 1977 in Japanese music, 1977 in Norwegian music
  - Notable events:
    - The musical Annie first performed
    - Lynyrd Skynyrd Convair 240 plane crash
  - Deaths of:
    - Elvis Presley
    - Bing Crosby
    - Marc Bolan
    - Erroll Garner
    - Ethel Waters
    - Maria Callas
  - Notable releases:
    - Fleetwood Mac – Rumours
    - Queen – News of the World
    - Bee Gees – Saturday Night Fever
    - Kraftwerk's Trans-Europe Express
    - Television – Marquee Moon
    - Sex Pistols – Never Mind the Bollocks, Here's the Sex Pistols
    - David Bowie – Low and Heroes
    - Pink Floyd – Animals
    - Earth, Wind & Fire – All 'n All
    - Electric Light Orchestra – Out of the Blue
    - Giorgio Moroder – From Here to Eternity
    - Taeko Onuki – Sunshower
    - Motörhead – Motorhead
    - Space – Magic Fly
    - Ashra – New Age of Earth
    - Weather Report – Heavy Weather
    - Meat Loaf – Bat Out of Hell
- 1976 in music, 1976 in British music, 1976 in Japanese music, 1976 in Norwegian music
  - Notable events:
    - The Band performs their final concert, The Last Waltz
    - Russian-soviet baritone Eduard Khil releases the song "I'm So Glad, as I'm Finally Returning Home", which in three decades time, would become an internet sensation on YouTube
  - Deaths of:
    - Benjamin Britten
    - Paul Robeson
    - Phil Ochs
    - Howlin' Wolf
    - Charles Stepney
    - Johnny Mercer
  - Notable releases:
    - David Bowie – Station to Station
    - Stevie Wonder – Songs in the Key of Life
    - Rush – 2112
    - Led Zeppelin – Presence
    - Bob Dylan – Desire
    - Rainbow – Rising
    - Judas Priest – Sad Wings of Destiny
    - Electric Light Orchestra – A New World Record
    - Camel – Moonmadness
    - Queen – A Day at the Races
    - Kiss – Destroyed
    - AC/DC – High Voltage and Dirty Deeds Done Dirt Cheap
    - ABBA – Arrival
    - Genesis – A Trick of the Tail
    - The Eagles – Hotel California
    - Andrew Lloyd Webber – Evita concept album
    - Jean-Michel Jarre – Oxygène
    - Mort Garson – Mother Earth's Plantasia
    - Ryo Fukui – Scenery
    - ABBA – Dancing Queen
    - Boston – Boston
    - The Ramones – Ramones
    - The Modern Lovers – The Modern Lovers
- 1975 in music, 1975 in British music, 1975 in Japanese music, 1975 in Norwegian music
  - Notable events:
    - The musical A Chorus Line is first performed
  - Deaths of
    - Dmitri Shostakovich
    - Tim Buckley
    - Umm Kulthum
    - Louis Jordan
    - Cannonball Adderley
    - Bernard Herrmann
  - Notable releases:
    - Bruce Springsteen – Born to Run
    - Brian Eno – Another Green World
    - Bruce Springsteen – Born to Run
    - Black Sabbath – Sabotage
    - David Bowie – Young Americans
    - Neil Young – Tonight's the Night
    - Neu! – Neu! '75
    - Fela Ransome Kuti & Africa 70 – Expensive Shit
    - Neil Young and Crazy Horse – Zuma
    - Parliament – Mothership Connection
    - Kraftwerk – Radio-Activity
    - Fleetwood Mac – Fleetwood Mac
    - Camel – The Snow Goose
    - Bob Dylan – Blood on the Tracks
    - Led Zeppelin – Physical Graffiti
    - Pink Floyd – Wish You Were Here
    - Aerosmith – Toys in the Attic
    - Henry Cow and Slapp Happy – In Praise of Learning
    - Patti Smith – Horses
    - Queen – A Night at the Opera
    - Donna Summer – Love to Love You Baby
- 1974 in music, 1974 in British music, 1974 in Japanese music, 1974 in Norwegian music
  - Deaths of:
    - Duke Ellington
    - Nick Drake
  - Notable releases:
    - David Bowie – Diamond Dogs
    - Camel – Mirage
    - Neil Young – On the Beach
    - Brian Eno – Here Come the Warm Jets & Taking Tiger Mountain (By Strategy)
    - Robert Wyatt – Rock Bottom
    - Genesis – The Lamb Lies Down on Broadway
    - Frank Zappa – Apostrophe (')
    - Electric Light Orchestra – Eldorado
    - Queen – Queen II, Sheer Heart Attack
    - Yes – Relayer
    - Sparks – Kimono My House
    - Supertramp – Crime of the Century
    - Steely Dan – Pretzel Logic
    - Joni Mitchell – Court and Spark
    - Big Star – Radio City
    - Jorge Ben – A Tábua de Esmeralda
    - Kraftwerk – Autobahn
    - King Crimson – Red and Starless and Bible Black
    - John Coltrane – Interstellar Space
    - Cluster – Zuckerzeit
    - Henry Cow – Unrest
    - Tangerine Dream – Phaedra
    - Isao Tomita – Snowflakes Are Dancing
    - Kiss – Kiss
- 1973 in music, 1973 in British music, 1973 in Japanese music, 1973 in Norwegian music –
  - Notable events:
    - The musical The Rocky Horror Show first performed
  - Deaths of:
    - Víctor Jara
    - Bobby Darin
    - Gram Parsons
  - Notable releases:
    - Pink Floyd – The Dark Side of the Moon
    - Led Zeppelin – Houses of the Holy
    - The Who – Quadrophenia Released
    - Buffalo – Volcanic Rock
    - Diana Ross – Touch Me in the Morning
    - David Bowie – Aladdin Sane
    - Elton John – Don't Shoot Me I'm Only the Piano Player and Goodbye Yellow Brick Road
    - Lou Reed – Berlin
    - Stevie Wonder – Innervisions
    - Can – Future Days
    - Genesis – Selling England by the Pound
    - The Stooges – Raw Power
    - Black Sabbath – Sabbath Bloody Sabbath
    - John Cale – Paris 1919
    - Queen – self-titled debut album
    - Camel – self-titled debut album
    - Steely Dan – Countdown to Ecstasy
    - Maureen McGovern – The Morning After
    - Roberta Flack – Killing Me Softly With His Song
    - Marie Osmond – Paper Roses
    - Mike Oldfield – Tubular Bells
    - King Crimson – Larks' Tongues in Aspic
    - Herbie Hancock – Head Hunters and Sextant
    - Brian Eno and Robert Fripp – (No Pussyfooting)
    - Mahavishnu Orchestra – Birds of Fire
    - Gal Costa – Índia
    - Magma – Mekanïk Destruktïw Kommandöh
    - Area – Arbeit macht frei
    - Faust – Faust IV
    - Haruomi Hosono – Hosono House
- 1972 in music, 1972 in British music, 1972 in Japanese music, 1972 in Norwegian music –
  - Deaths of:
    - Ferde Grofe
    - Carl Stalling
  - Notable releases:
    - The Rolling Stones – Exile on Main St.
    - Elton John – Honky Château
    - David Bowie – The Rise and Fall of Ziggy Stardust and the Spiders from Mars
    - Can – Ege Bamyası
    - Premiata Forneria Marconi – Per un amico
    - Styx - Styx
    - Bette Midler – The Divine Miss M
    - Neu! – Neu!
    - Big Star (#1 Record)
    - Steely Dan – Can't Buy a Thrill
- 1971 in music, 1971 in British music, 1971 in Japanese music, 1971 in Norwegian music
  - Deaths of:
    - Igor Stravinsky
    - Duane Allman
    - Louis Armstrong
    - Jim Morrison
    - Carl Ruggles
  - Notable releases:
    - Led Zeppelin – Led Zeppelin IV
    - David Bowie – Hunky Dory
    - Marvin Gaye – What's Going On
    - The Who – Who's Next
    - Elton John – Madman Across the Water
    - Pink Floyd – Meddle
    - Joni Mitchell – Blue
    - Can – Tago Mago
    - Serge Gainsbourg – Histoire de Melody Nelson
    - Flower Travellin' Band – Satori
- 1970 in music, 1970 in British music, 1970 in Japanese music, 1970 in Norwegian music
  - Notable events:
    - The Beatles disband
    - Diana Ross departs from The Supremes and releases "Ain't No Mountain High Enough"
    - Andrew Lloyd Webber and Tim Rice release a concept album of their debut musical Jesus Christ Superstar (which gives birth to the musical name "rock opera")
  - Deaths of:
    - Jimi Hendrix
    - Janis Joplin
    - Alfred Newman
    - Tammi Terrell
    - George Szell
  - Notable releases:
    - Led Zeppelin – Led Zeppelin III
    - John Lennon – John Lennon/Plastic Ono Band
    - The Beatles - Let It Be
    - Elton John – his self-titled album
    - Miles Davis – Bitches Brew
    - The Jackson 5 – ABC
    - Soft Machine – Third
    - Black Sabbath – Paranoid
    - George Harrison – All Things Must Pass
    - Pink Floyd – Atom Heart Mother

== 1960s ==
- 1969 in music, 1969 in British music, 1969 in Japanese music, 1969 in Norwegian music
  - Notable events:
    - Woodstock music festival held in Bethel, New York
  - Deaths of:
    - Brian Jones
    - Judy Garland
    - Paul Chambers
    - Coleman Hawkins
    - Ted Heath
    - Leigh Harline
  - Notable releases:
    - The Beatles – Abbey Road and Yellow Submarine
    - Bob Dylan – Nashville Skyline
    - Frank Zappa – Hot Rats
    - David Bowie – Space Oddity
    - The Who – Tommy
    - King Crimson – In the Court of the Crimson King
    - Led Zeppelin – Led Zeppelin and Led Zeppelin II
    - Nick Drake – Five Leaves Left
    - Pink Floyd – Ummagumma and More
    - The Magic Band – Trout Mask Replica
    - The Velvet Underground – The Velvet Underground
    - Santana – Santana
    - Miles Davis – In a Silent Way and Filles de Kilimanjaro
    - The Rolling Stones – Let It Bleed
    - The Stooges – The Stooges
    - Neil Young and the Crazy Horse – Everybody Knows This Is Nowhere
    - The Kinks – Arthur (Or the Decline and Fall of the British Empire)
    - Pharoah Sanders – Karma
    - Scott Walker – Scott 4
    - Moondog – Moondog
    - Creedence Clearwater Revival – Green River and Willy and the Poor Boys
    - The Doors – The Soft Parade
    - Sun Ra – Atlantis
    - MC5 – Kick Out the Jams
    - Sly and the Family Stone – Stand!
    - Terry Riley – A Rainbow in Curved Air
    - White Noise – An Electric Storm
    - Silver Apples – Contact
    - Can – Monster Movie
    - Amon Düül II – Phallus Dei
    - Serge Gainsbourg and Jane Birkin – Jane Birkin/Serge Gainsbourg
    - The Archies – Sugar, Sugar
- 1968 in music, 1968 in British music, 1968 in Japanese music, 1968 in Norwegian music
  - Notable events:
  - Deaths of:
    - Jan Johansson
  - Notable releases
    - Van Morrison – Astral Weeks
    - Sammy Davis Jr. – I've Gotta Be Me
    - The Rolling Stones – Beggars Banquet
    - The Jimi Hendrix Experience – Electric Ladyland
    - The Beatles – The Beatles (AKA The White Album)
    - Johnny Cash – At Folsom Prison
    - The Band – Music from Big Pink
    - Anne Murray – What About Me
    - The Mothers of Invention – We're Only in It for the Money
    - Silver Apples – Silver Apples
    - The United States of America – The United States of America
    - The Velvet Underground – White Light/White Heat
    - Pink Floyd – A Saucerful of Secrets
    - The Zombies – Odessey and Oracle
    - The Kinks – The Kinks Are the Village Green Preservation Society
    - The Doors – Waiting for the Sun
    - Nico – The Marble Index
    - Cream – Wheels of Fire
    - Soft Machine – The Soft Machine
    - The Byrds – The Notorious Byrd Brothers
    - Gábor Szabó – Dreams
    - Os Mutantes – Os Mutantes
    - Peter Brötzmann – Machine Gun
- 1967 in music, 1967 in British music, 1967 in Japanese music, 1967 in Norwegian music
  - Notable events:
    - Monterey Pop Festival
  - Deaths of
    - Woody Guthrie
    - John Coltrane
    - Billy Strayhorn
    - Otis Redding
    - Brian Epstein
    - Joe Meek
    - Ina Boyle
    - Paul Whiteman
  - Notable releases:
    - The Beatles – Sgt. Pepper's Lonely Hearts Club Band & Magical Mystery Tour
    - The Velvet Underground – The Velvet Underground & Nico
    - The Mothers of Invention – Absolutely Free
    - The Jimi Hendrix Experience – Are You Experienced & Axis: Bold as Love
    - Pink Floyd – The Piper at the Gates of Dawn
    - David Bowie – David Bowie (Debut)
    - Aretha Franklin – I Never Loved a Man the Way I Love You which features her own and iconic version of Respect.
    - The Doors – The Doors (including "Light My Fire") & Strange Days
    - Louis Armstrong – "What a Wonderful World"
    - Bob Dylan – John Wesley Harding
    - The 13th Floor Elevators – Easter Everywhere
    - Love – Forever Changes
    - Leonard Cohen – Songs of Leonard Cohen
    - Captain Beefheart and his Magic Band – Safe as Milk
    - Cream – Disraeli Gears
    - Jefferson Airplane – Surrealistic Pillow
    - The Who – The Who Sell Out
    - The Kinks – Something Else by the Kinks
    - Nico – Chelsea Girl
    - The Moody Blues with the London Festival Orchestra – Days of Future Passed
    - The Beach Boys – Wild Honey and Smiley Smile
    - The Rolling Stones – Their Satanic Majesties Request
    - Miles Davis – Miles Smiles
    - Antônio Carlos Jobim – Wave
    - Red Krayola (with The Familiar Ugly) – The Parable of Arable Land
    - Duke Ellington – Far East Suite
- 1966 in music, 1966 in British music, 1966 in Japanese music, 1966 in Norwegian music
  - Notable events:
  - Deaths of:
    - Bobby Fuller
    - Fritz Wunderlich
  - Notable releases:
    - The Beach Boys – Pet Sounds
    - Cream – Fresh Cream
    - The Beatles – Yesterday and Today and Revolver
    - Bob Dylan – Blonde on Blonde
    - The 13th Floor Elevators – The Psychedelic Sounds of the 13th Floor Elevators
    - The Monkees – The Monkees
    - The Mothers of Invention – Freak Out!
    - The Rolling Stones – Aftermath
    - Simon & Garfunkel – Sounds of Silence and Parsley, Sage, Rosemary and Thyme
    - The Kinks – Face to Face
    - The Monks – Black Monk Time
    - Love – Da Capo
    - The Byrds – Fifth Dimension
    - The Who – A Quick One
    - Donovan – Sunshine Superman
    - The Yardbirds – Roger the Engineer
    - Them – Them Again
    - Buffalo Springfield – Buffalo Springfield
    - Nina Simone – Wild Is the Wind
    - John Mayall & the Bluesbreakers – Blues Breakers with Eric Clapton
    - The Mamas & the Papas – If You Can Believe Your Eyes and Ears
    - John Coltrane – Ascension and Meditations
    - Ennio Morricone – soundtrack album to the 1966 Italian western film The Good, the Bad and the Ugly
    - Herbie Hancock – Maidene Voyage
    - Wayne Shorter – Speak No Evil
    - Krzysztof Komeda – Astigmatic
    - Larry Young – Unity
- 1965 in music, 1965 in British music, 1965 in Japanese music, 1965 in Norwegian music
  - Notable events:
    - The musical Man of La Mancha first performed
  - Deaths of:
    - Edgar Varèse
    - Nat King Cole
    - Alan Freed
    - Jack Hylton
    - Tadd Dameron
    - Spike Jones
  - Notable releases:
    - The Beatles – Help! and Rubber Soul
    - Bob Dylan – Bringing It All Back Home and Highway 61 Revisited (with the single "Like a Rolling Stone")
    - The Rolling Stones – Out of Our Heads (with the single "(I Can't Get No) Satisfaction")
    - Tom Jones – "What's New Pussycat?"
    - James Brown – "I Got You (I Feel Good)"
    - Otis Redding – Otis Blue/Otis Redding Sings Soul
    - The Who – My Generation
    - The Beach Boys – The Beach Boys Today!, Summer Days (And Summer Nights!!) and Beach Boys' Party!
    - Nina Simone – Pastel Blues and I Put a Spell on You
    - The Byrds – Mr. Tambourine Man and Turn! Turn! Turn!
    - The Sonics – Here Are The Sonics
    - Jackson C. Frank – Jackson C. Frank
    - The Yardbirds – Having a Rave Up with the Yardbirds
    - Martha and the Vandellas – Dance Party
    - Cher – All I Really Want to Do
    - The Shangri-Las – Leader of the Pack
    - John Coltrane – A Love Supreme
    - Vince Guaraldi – A Charlie Brown Christmas the soundtrack album to the Peanuts animated television special of the same name.
    - Herb Alpert and the Tijuana Brass – Going Places
    - Albert Ayler – Spiritual Unity
    - Grant Green – Idle Moments
    - Andrew Hill – Point of Departure
    - Bobby Hutcherson – Dialogue
- 1964 in music, 1964 in British music, 1964 in Japanese music, 1964 in Norwegian music
  - Notable events:
    - Bill Lear invents 8-track tape cartridge
  - Deaths of:
    - Cole Porter
    - Sam Cooke
    - Milton Babbitt
    - Jack Teagarden
    - Eric Dolphy
  - Notable releases:
    - The Beatles – A Hard Day's Night and Beatles for Sale
    - Stan Getz and João Gilberto – Getz/Gilberto
    - The Ronettes – Presenting the Fabulous Ronettes Featuring Veronica
    - Eric Dolphy – Out to Lunch!
    - Bob Dylan – The Times They Are a-Changin' and Another Side of Bob Dylan
    - The Beach Boys – All Summer Long (featuring the No. 1. hit I Get Around)
    - The Rolling Stones – The Rolling Stones and 12 x 5
    - Charles Mingus – Mingus Mingus Mingus Mingus Mingus
    - Herbie Hancock – Empyrean Isles
    - Lee Morgan – The Sidewinder
    - Kinks – The Kinks
    - John Coltrane – Crescent
    - Simon & Garfunkel – Wednesday Morning, 3 A.M.
    - Yusef Lateef – Eastern Sounds
    - Muddy Waters – Folk Singer
    - Andrew Hill – Black Fire
    - The Supremes – Where Did Our Love Go
    - Sam Cooke – Ain't That Good News
    - Dusty Springfield – A Girl Called Dusty
- 1963 in music, 1963 in British music, 1963 in Japanese music, 1963 in Norwegian music
  - Notable events:
    - First cassette tapes made by Philips
  - Deaths of:
    - Francis Poulenc
    - Paul Hindemith
    - Patsy Cline
    - Dinah Washington
    - Édith Piaf
    - Axel Stordahl
    - Fritz Reiner
  - Notable releases:
    - The Beatles – Please Please Me and With the Beatles
    - Charles Mingus – The Black Saint and the Sinner Lady
    - Bob Dylan – The Freewheelin' Bob Dylan
    - James Brown and The Famous Flames – Live at the Apollo
    - The Righteous Brothers – Little Latin Lupe Lu
    - Duke Ellington, Charles Mingus and Max Roach – Money Jungle
    - Thelonious Monk – Monk's Dream
    - Duke Ellington and John Coltrane – Duke Ellington & John Coltrane
    - Jorge Ben – Samba Esquema Novo
    - The Beach Boys – Surfin' U.S.A., Surfer Girl and Little Deuce Coupe
    - John Coltrane – Ballads
    - A Christmas Gift for You from Phil Spector a collection of Christmas songs is released on Philles Records
    - John Coltrane and Johnny Hartman – John Coltrane and Johnny Hartman
    - Sam Cooke – Night Beat
    - Kenny Burrell – Midnight Blue
    - Gerry Mulligan – Night Lights
    - Stan Getz and Luiz Bonfá – Jazz Samba Encore!
    - Marvin Gaye – That Stubborn Kinda Fellow
    - Stevie Wonder – fingertips -aged only 13, arguably making Motown music commercially popular for the first time even though its birth was in 1959
    - Elvis Presley – Today, Tomorrow and Forever
- 1962 in music, 1962 in British music, 1962 in Japanese music, 1962 in Norwegian music
  - Notable events:
  - Deaths of:
    - Marilyn Monroe
    - Fritz Kreisler
    - Harry Barris
  - Notable releases:
    - Charles Mingus – Tijuana Moods and Oh Yeah
    - The Beach Boys – Surfin' Safari
    - Bill Evans and Jim Hall – Undercurrent
    - John Coltrane – Coltrane
    - Dexter Gordon – Go
    - Françoise Hardy – Tous les garçons et les filles
    - Stan Getz and Charlie Byrd – Jazz Samba
    - Booker T. & the M.G.'s – Green Onions
    - Herbie Hancock – Takin' Off
    - Ray Charles – Modern Sounds in Country and Western Music
    - Bill Evans Trio – Waltz for Debby
    - Duke Ellington, Charles Mingus and Max Roach – Money Jungle
    - Bob Dylan – Bob Dylan (Debut)
- 1961 in music, 1961 in British music, 1961 in Japanese music, 1961 in Norwegian music
  - Notable events:
  - Deaths of:
    - Cisco Houston
    - Moss Hart
    - Thomas Beecham
    - Carlos Salzedo
  - Notable releases:
    - John Coltrane – My Favorite Things and Olé Coltrane
    - Ornette Coleman – Free Jazz: A Collective Improvisation
    - John Coltrane – Africa/Brass
    - Max Roach – We Insist!
    - Oliver Nelson – The Blues and the Abstract Truth
    - Eric Dolphy – Out There
    - Thelonious Monk – Thelonious Monk with John Coltrane
- 1960 in music, 1960 in British music, 1960 in Norwegian music
  - Notable events:
    - The musical Oliver! first performed
  - Deaths of:
    - Oscar Hammerstein II
    - Eddie Cochran
  - Notable releases:
    - John Coltrane – Giant Steps
    - Miles Davis – Sketches of Spain
    - Charles Mingus – Blues & Roots and Mingus Dynasty
    - Bill Evans – Portrait in Jazz
    - Joan Baez – self-titled debut album
    - Etta James – At Last!
    - Wes Montgomery – The Incredible Jazz Guitar of Wes Montgomery
    - Hank Mobley – Soul Station
    - Ornette Coleman – Change of the Century
    - João Gilberto – O Amor, o Sorriso e a Flor
    - Tina Brooks – True Blue

== 1950s ==
1959 in music, 1959 in British music, 1959 in Norwegian music

- Notable events:
  - 1st Grammy Awards are awarded
  - Motown Records is founded, with their first hit being Barrett Strong's "Money (That's What I Want)".
  - The musical Gypsy first performed
  - The musical The Sound of Music first performed
- Deaths of:
  - Billie Holiday
  - Ritchie Valens
  - Buddy Holly
  - the Big Bopper
  - Heitor Villa-Lobos
- Notable releases:
  - Miles Davis – Kind of Blue, Porgy and Bess and Workin' with the Miles Davis Quintet
  - Charles Mingus – Mingus Ah Um
  - The Dave Brubeck Quartet – Time Out
  - Ornette Coleman – The Shape of Jazz to Come
  - Art Blakey and The Jazz Messengers – Moanin'
  - Marty Robbins – Gunfighter Ballads and Trail Songs
  - João Gilberto – Chega de Saudade
  - Odetta – My Eyes Have Seen
  - Sun Ra and his Arkestra – Jazz in Silhouette
  - Nina Simone – Little Girl Blue
  - Bill Evans – Everybody Digs Bill Evans
  - John Fahey – Blind Joe Death
  - Chuck Berry – Berry Is on Top
  - Dizzy Gillespie, Sonny Stitt and Sonny Rollins – Sonny Side Up
  - Ray Charles – The Genius of Ray Charles
  - Chet Baker – Chet
  - Enoch Light and his Orchestra – Persuasive Percussion
  - Frank Sinatra – Come Dance with Me!
  - Horace Silver – Blowin' the Blues Away
  - Bobby Darin – "Mack the Knife"

1958 in music, 1958 in British music, 1958 in Norwegian music

- Notable events:
  - There is a Bossa Nova fever
  - Little Richard enters seminary
- Deaths of:
  - Ralph Vaughan Williams
  - W.C. Handy
- Notable releases:
  - Alvin and the Chipmunks – "The Chipmunk Song (Christmas Don't Be Late)"
  - Cannonball Adderley – Somethin' Else
  - Art Blakey and the Jazz Messengers – Moanin'
  - Count Basie and his orchestra – The Atomic Mr. Basie
  - John Coltrane – Blue Train
  - Frank Sinatra – Frank Sinatra Sings for Only the Lonely
  - Billie Holiday – Lady in Satin
  - Frank Sinatra – Come Fly with Me
  - Ella Fitzgerald – Ella Fitzgerald Sings the Irving Berlin Song Book
  - Miles Davis – Milestones, Ascenseur pour l'échafaud and Relaxin' with the Miles Davis Quintet
  - Buddy Holly – Buddy Holly
  - Carl Ruggles – Exaltation in honour of his late wife, Charlotte.
  - Cliff Richard & The Drifters – Move It (Considered Britain's first rock and roll hit single).
  - John Serry Sr. - Chicago Musette: John Serry et Son Accordéon (released in France)

1957 in music, 1957 in British music, 1957 in Norwegian music

- Notable events:
  - West Side Story first performed
- Deaths of:
  - Jean Sibelius
  - Erich Wolfgang Korngold
  - Arturo Toscanini
  - Jimmy Dorsey
- Notable releases:
  - Buddy Holly & The Crickets – "That'll Be the Day"
  - Harry Belafonte – calypso song "Day-O"
  - folk singer Odetta – At the Gate of Horn
  - Sonny Rollins – Saxophone Colossus
  - Miles Davis – Miles Ahead, 'Round About Midnight and Cookin' with the Miles Davis Quintet
  - Thelonious Monk – Brilliant Corners and Monk's Music
  - Charles Mingus – The Clown
  - Little Richard – Here's Little Richard
  - Johnny Cash – Johnny Cash with His Hot and Blue Guitar!
  - The Crickets – The "Chirping" Crickets
  - Chuck Berry – After School Session
  - Sonny Rollins – Way Out West
  - Elvis Presley – Elvis' Christmas Album

1956 in music, 1956 in British music, 1956 in Norwegian music

- Notable events:
  - The first Eurovision Song Contest is held on 24 May
  - The operetta Candide first performed
- Deaths of:
  - Tommy Dorsey
- Notable releases:
  - Odetta – Odetta Sings Ballads and Blues (Debut)
  - Elvis Presley – self-titled debut album (Debut)
  - John Serry Sr. - Squeeze Play

1955 in music, 1955 in British music, 1955 in Norwegian music

- Notable events:
  - Cole Porter's Silk Stockings first performed
- Deaths of:
  - George Enescu
  - Arthur Honegger
  - Charlie Parker
- Notable releases:
  - "Rock Around the Clock" becomes first worldwide No. 1 rock and roll record;
  - Little Richard – "Tutti-Frutti"
  - Harry James – Harry James in Hi-Fi
  - Lonnie Donegan – "Rock Island Line"

1954 in music, 1954 in British music, 1954 in Norwegian music –

- Notable events:
  - The musical Salad Days first performed
  - First Fender Stratocaster produced
- Deaths of:
  - Charles Ives
  - Wilhelm Furtwängler
  - Billy Murray
- Notable releases:
  - Elvis Presley's debut single, "That's All Right"

1953 in music, 1953 in British music, 1953 in Norwegian music

- Notable events:
  - The musical Can-Can is performed
- Deaths of:
  - Hank Williams
  - Sergei Prokofiev
  - Django Reinhardt
  - Florence Price
- Notable releases:

1952 in music, 1952 in British music, 1952 in Norwegian music

- Notable events:
  - The official UK singles chart is launched
  - Recording Industry Association of America (or RIAA) established
- Deaths of:
  - Gertrude Lawrence
  - Fletcher Henderson
- Notable releases:

1951 in music, 1951 in British music, 1951 in Norwegian music

- Notable events:
  - The musical The King and I first performed
- Deaths of:
  - Arnold Schoenberg
  - Mildred Bailey
- Notable releases:
  - Ike Turner – Rocket 88 (hailed as the first rock 'n' roll song)

1950 in music, 1950 in British music, 1950 in Norwegian music

- Notable events:
- Deaths of:
  - Kurt Weill
  - Al Jolson
  - Vaslav Nijinsky
- Notable releases:
  - Cartoon voice actor Mel Blanc releases the song "I Tawt I Taw a Puddy Tat" as Looney Tunes characters Tweety and Sylvester

== 1940s ==
- 1949 in music, 1949 in British music, 1949 in Norwegian music – Birth of Bruce Springsteen, Maureen McGovern, Valery Leontiev, Paul Rodgers, Billy Joel, Steve Perry, Rick Springfield, Gene Simmons, Lionel Richie, Roger Taylor and Mark Knopfler; RCA Victor introduces 45 RPM records; South Pacific by Rodgers and Hammerstein Death of Richard Strauss German composer
- 1948 in music, 1948 in British music, 1948 in Norwegian music – Birth of Robert Plant, John Bonham, Steven Tyler, Donna Summer, Johnny Ramone, Ted Nugent, Andrew Lloyd Webber, James Taylor, Alice Cooper, Jackson Browne, Kenny Loggins, Ian Paice, Olivia Newton-John, Stevie Nicks, and Ozzy Osbourne; Kiss Me, Kate – Cole Porter; Four Last Songs – Richard Strauss; Columbia Records introduces 331/3 RPM (LP) records.
- 1947 in music, 1947 in British music, 1947 in Norwegian music – Birth of Elton John, David Bowie, Bob Weir, Brian Johnson, Emmylou Harris, Arlo Guthrie, Tracy Nelson, Paul Brady, Tim Buckley, Jim Messina, Mick Fleetwood, Organum, Jeff Lynne, Minnie Riperton, and Carlos Santana
- 1946 in music, 1946 in British music, 1946 in Norwegian music – Birth of Freddie Mercury, Toquinho, Keith Moon, Benny Andersson, Bon Scott, Tim Curry, Donovan, Linda Ronstadt, Marianne Faithfull, Gram Parsons, Cher, Patti Smith, David Gilmour, John Paul Jones and Dolly Parton
- 1945 in music, 1945 in British music, 1945 in Norwegian music – Birth of Bob Marley, Pete Townshend, Neil Young, Van Morrison, Bob Seger, Bob Welch, Bette Midler, Deborah Harry, Anne Murray, Carly Simon, John Fogerty, Rod Stewart, Kim Carnes, Davy Jones, Micky Dolenz, Anni-Frid Lyngstad, Björn Ulvaeus, John McVie, Ian Gillan, Roger Glover, Ritchie Blackmore, Itzhak Perlman, Debbie Harry and Eric Clapton; Death of Jerome Kern; Peter Grimes by Benjamin Britten premieres in London; Carousel – Rodgers and Hammerstein; Metamorphosen by Richard Strauss;
- 1944 in music, 1944 in British music, 1944 in Norwegian music – Birth of Keith Emerson, Barry White, Diana Ross, Jeff Beck, Chico Buarque, Marvin Hamlisch, Roger Daltrey, John Entwistle, Booker T. Jones, Joe Cocker, Patti LaBelle, Gladys Knight, Gary Glitter, Brenda Lee, Townes Van Zandt, Mary Wilson (singer) and Jimmy Page; Disappearance of Glenn Miller,
- 1943 in music, 1943 in British music, 1943 in Norwegian music – Birth of Mick Jagger, Keith Richards, Jim Morrison, George Harrison, Janis Joplin, Joni Mitchell, Robbie Robertson, Richard Manuel, John Denver, Jack Bruce, Barry Manilow, Christine McVie, Jim Croce, Carlos, Gavin Bryars, Bobby Sherman, Roger Waters, Richard Wright, and Nils-Aslak Valkeapää; Death of Lorenz Hart, Sergei Rachmaninoff, Formation of Rodgers and Hammerstein, Carl Ruggles, Evocations; The original Broadway production of Oklahoma! opened on March 31, 1943, at the St. James Theatre in New York City.
- 1942 in music, 1942 in British music, 1942 in Norwegian music – Birth of Paul McCartney, Jimi Hendrix, Brian Jones, John P. Hammond, Ronnie James Dio, Brian Wilson, Jerry Garcia, Peter Tork, Michael Nesmith, Aretha Franklin, Barbra Streisand, Carole King, Rick Danko, Lou Reed, Paul Butterfield, Jerry Jeff Walker and Tammy Wynette; Death of George M. Cohan
- 1941 in music, 1941 in British music, 1941 in Norwegian music – Birth of Bob Dylan, Joan Baez, Paul Simon, Art Garfunkel, Hank Marvin, Otis Redding, Jon Lord, Chubby Checker, Aaron Neville, Charlie Watts, Neil Diamond, Richie Havens, Cass Elliot, Wilson Pickett, Linda McCartney and Ritchie Valens; Les Paul builds one of the first solid-body electric guitars;
- 1940 in music, 1940 in British music, 1940 in Norwegian music – Birth of John Lennon, Ringo Starr, Frank Zappa, Tom Jones, Vicente Fernández, Dionne Warwick, Cliff Richard, Phil Ochs, Levon Helm, Nancy Sinatra, Denny Doherty, Smokey Robinson, Ricky Nelson, Tim Hardin, Dionne Warwick, Bobby Hatfield, Bill Medley and (both of the Righteous Brothers)

== 1930s ==
- 1939 in music, 1939 in British music, 1939 in Norwegian music – Birth of Judy Collins, Marvin Gaye, Ray Manzarek, Ginger Baker, Tina Turner and Grace Slick; Cole Porter's DuBarry Was a Lady; Judy Garland records "Over the Rainbow"
- 1938 in music, 1938 in British music, 1938 in Norwegian music – Birth of Peter Yarrow, Gordon Lightfoot, Ben E. King, Fela Kuti, Kenny Rogers, Death of Robert Johnson, Benny Goodman presents a jazz concert in Carnegie Hall; Death of Dan W. Quinn
- 1937 in music, 1937 in British music, 1937 in Norwegian music – Death of George Gershwin, Birth of Roberta Flack, Waylon Jennings, Merle Haggard, Garth Hudson, Tom Paxton, Philip Glass, Dame Shirley Bassey, Carl Orff's Carmina Burana premieres
- 1936 in music, 1936 in British music, 1936 in Norwegian music – Birth of Buddy Holly, Roy Orbison, Kris Kristofferson, Bill Wyman, Dave Van Ronk, Steve Reich, Bobby Darin, Billboard publishes first U.S. music chart
- 1935 in music, 1935 in British music, 1935 in Norwegian music – Birth of Elvis Presley, Jerry Lee Lewis, Gene Vincent, Luciano Pavarotti, Julie Andrews, Ronnie Hawkins, Johnnie Mathis, John Phillips, Lou Rawls, La Monte Young, Terry Riley; Audiovox produce first electric bass guitar; Porgy and Bess by George Gershwin premieres in New York
- 1934 in music, 1934 in British music, 1934 in Norwegian music – Cole Porter's Anything Goes; Birth of Leonard Cohen, Jackie Wilson; Tammy Grimes, Bob Shane, King Curtis, Florence Henderson, Renata Scotto, Shirley Jones, Otis Rush, Frankie Valli, Pat Boone, André Prévost, Freddie King, Brian Epstein, Dave Guard, Del Shannon; Deaths of Edward Elgar and Gustav Holst
- 1933 in music, 1933 in British music, 1933 in Norwegian music – Birth of James Brown, Quincy Jones, Willie Nelson, Nina Simone, Yoko Ono, Nick Reynolds
- 1932 in music, 1932 in British music, 1932 in Norwegian music – Night and Day by Cole Porter; Birth of Johnny Cash, Joel Grey, Petula Clark, Patsy Cline, Glenn Gould, Loretta Lynn, Miriam Makeba Carl Perkins, Little Richard, and John Williams; Death of John Philip Sousa; Adolph Rickenbacker produces first electric guitar; Bell Labs creates first stereophonic sound recordings
- 1931 in music, 1931 in British music, 1931 in Norwegian music – Birth of Teresa Brewer, Sam Cooke, João Gilberto, George Jones and Phyllis McGuire; Death of Anna Pavlova
- 1930 in music, 1930 in British music, 1930 in Norwegian music – Birth of Ray Charles, Herbie Mann, Odetta, Sonny Rollins, Stephen Sondheim, and The Big Bopper

== 1920s ==
- 1929 in music, 1929 in British music, 1929 in Norwegian music – Cole Porter's Fifty Million Frenchmen; Birth of Beverly Sills, Bill Evans, Dick Clark, Berry Gordy, Henri Pousseur
- 1928 in music, 1928 in British music, 1928 in Norwegian music – Birth of Bo Diddley and Karlheinz Stockhausen; Fats Domino The Threepenny Opera by Kurt Weill and Bertolt Brecht (libretto) premieres in Berlin
- 1927 in music, 1927 in British music, 1927 in Norwegian music – Jerome Kern's Show Boat; Igor Stravinsky's Apollo; Birth of Harry Belafonte, Antônio Carlos Jobim, Patti Page, Ralph Stanley
- 1926 in music, 1926 in British music, 1926 in Norwegian music – Tapiola by Jean Sibelius; Birth of Marilyn Monroe, Joan Sutherland, John Coltrane, Miles Davis, Chuck Berry, Tony Bennett, Big Mama Thornton; Turandot by Giacomo Puccini premieres in Milan
- 1925 in music, 1925 in British music, 1925 in Norwegian music – Birth of Celia Cruz, B.B. King and Pierre Boulez; Big record labels begin using electric microphones for recording; 78 RPM adopted as standard for records; BBC makes first radio broadcast in stereo; Wozzeck by Alban Berg premieres in Berlin, Carl Ruggles, Portals. Debut of the Grand Ole Opry.
- 1924 in music, 1924 in British music, 1924 in Norwegian music – Gershwin's Rhapsody in Blue premieres in New York; the Symphony No. 7 by Jean Sibelius; Death of Giacomo Antonio Domenico Michele Secondo Maria Puccini, Italian opera composer, Carl Ruggles. Men and Mountains. Debut of the National Barn Dance, the first radio program devoted to country music.
- 1923 in music, 1923 in British music, 1923 in Norwegian music – Birth of Hank Williams, First recordings by Louis Armstrong, Bessie Smith, and many other African-American artists, Carl Ruggles, Vox clamans in deserto
- 1922 in music, 1922 in British music, 1922 in Norwegian music – Birth of Judy Garland.
- 1921 in music, 1921 in British music, 1921 in Norwegian music – Death of Enrico Caruso, Carl Ruggles Angels
- 1920 in music, 1920 in British music, 1920 in Norwegian music – Birth of Charlie Parker, Ravi Shankar, Isaac Stern; Death of Alberto Nepomuceno, Brazilian composer, pianist, organist and conductor.

== 1910s ==
- 1919 in music, 1919 in British music, 1919 in Norwegian music – Birth of Pete Seeger, Merce Cunningham, Carl Ruggles, Toys
- 1918 in music, 1918 in British music, 1918 in Norwegian music – Phonograph cylinders become obsolete; the Society for Private Musical Performances is founded in Vienna by Arnold Schoenberg; Death of Claude Debussy
- 1917 in music, 1917 in British music, 1917 in Norwegian music – Birth of Lou Harrison, Ella Fitzgerald, John Lee Hooker, Dinu Lipatti, Isang Yun; First hit jazz recordings by Original Dixieland Jass Band, Death of Scott Joplin
- 1916 in music, 1916 in British music, 1916 in Norwegian music – Birth of Milton Babbitt, Henri Dutilleux, Alberto Ginastera, Betty Grable, Harry James, Dinah Shore,
- 1915 in music, 1915 in British music, 1915 in Norwegian music – An Alpine Symphony by Richard Strauss; Birth of Billie Holiday, Frank Sinatra, John Serry, Sr.; Tom Brown starts billing his group as a "Jass Band"
- 1914 in music, 1914 in British music, 1914 in Norwegian music – "St. Louis Blues" published; first calypso music recordings
- 1913 in music, 1913 in British music, 1913 in Norwegian music – Birth of Muddy Waters, Vinicius de Moraes, Benjamin Britten English Composer; Igor Stravinsky's The Rite of Spring is premiered in Paris.
- 1912 in music, 1912 in British music, 1912 in Norwegian music – Birth of Woody Guthrie, Lightnin' Hopkins, John Cage
- 1911 in music, 1911 in British music, 1911 in Norwegian music – Birth of Robert Johnson, Der Rosenkavalier by Richard Strauss premieres in Dresden, Death of Gustav Mahler, Austrian composer and conductor
- 1910 in music, 1910 in British music, 1910 in Norwegian music – Birth of Howlin' Wolf, Artie Shaw, John H. Hammond, Django Reinhardt; "Let Me Call You Sweetheart"

== 1900s ==
- 1909 in music, 1909 in British music, 1909 in Norwegian music – Death of Francisco Tárrega; Elektra by Richard Strauss premieres in Dresden; Birth of Benny Goodman
- 1908 in music, 1908 in British music, 1908 in Norwegian music – The two first atonal pieces are composed, first by Béla Bartók and then by Arnold Schoenberg Death of Nikolai Rimsky-Korsakov.
- 1907 in music, 1907 in British music, 1907 in Norwegian music – Death of Edvard Grieg, Norwegian composer (b. 1843); Birth of Gene Autry, Cab Calloway, Benny Carter, Kate Smith
- 1906 in music, 1906 in British music, 1906 in Norwegian music – Birth of Dmitri Shostakowich, soviet composer and pianist, Victor begins selling the Victrola phonograph player for $15.00; Len Spencer, I Am The Edison Phonograph --- earliest recorded advert played in Phonograph shops to sell the devices; the Symphony No. 8 by Gustav Mahler: Birth of Pedro Vargas known as the "Nightingale of the Americas".
- 1905 in music, 1905 in British music, 1905 in Norwegian music – The Merry Widow by Franz Lehár premieres in Vienna; Salome by Richard Strauss premieres in Dresden
- 1904 in music, 1904 in British music, 1904 in Norwegian music – The Violin Concerto (Sibelius) by Jean Sibelius; Death of Antonín Dvořák, Czech composer, Madama Butterfly by Giacomo Puccini premieres in Milan
- 1903 in music, 1903 in British music, 1903 in Norwegian music – Valse triste by Jean Sibelius; Birth of Bing Crosby and Vladimir Horowitz
- 1902 in music, 1902 in British music, 1902 in Norwegian music – Birth of Richard Rodgers, Pelléas et Mélisande by Claude Debussy premieres in Paris
- 1901 in music, 1901 in British music, 1901 in Norwegian music – Birth of Louis Armstrong, Death of Giuseppe Verdi, Italian composer, Birth of Silvestre Vargas
- 1900 in music, 1900 in British music, 1900 in Norwegian music – Tosca by Giacomo Puccini premieres in Rome

== 1890s ==
- 1899 in music, 1899 in Norwegian music – Rusalka by Antonín Dvořák; Ein Heldenleben by Richard Strauss; Symphony No. 1 and publication of Finlandia by Jean Sibelius; Shéhérazade (Ravel) by Maurice Ravel; Enigma Variations by Edward Elgar; "Maple Leaf Rag" by Scott Joplin; Death of Johann Strauss II; Birth of Duke Ellington; Birth of Silvestre Revueltas
- 1898 in music, 1898 in Norwegian music – Birth of George Gershwin, Paul Robeson
- 1897 in music, 1897 in Norwegian music – Ragtime music becomes popular in the United States; Death of Brahms, Birth of Marian Anderson
- 1896 in music, 1896 in Norwegian music – Also sprach Zarathustra by Richard Strauss; Jungfrun i tornet by Jean Sibelius; Death of Carlos Gomes, Brazilian composer and opera composer and Anton Bruckner, Austrian composer and organist
- 1895 in music, 1895 in Norwegian music – The Swan of Tuonela by Jean Sibelius; Till Eulenspiegel's Merry Pranks by Richard Strauss; Birth of Carl Orff, Oscar Hammerstein II, William Grant Still, the "Dean of African-American music"
- 1894 in music, 1894 in Norwegian music – Cello Concerto and Humoresques by Antonín Dvořák
- 1893 in music, 1893 in Norwegian music – Symphony No. 9 and String Quartet No. 12 by Antonín Dvořák; Symphony No. 3 by Gustav Mahler; Karelia Suite by Jean Sibelius; Death of Pyotr Ilyich Tchaikovsky, Russian composer
- 1892 in music, 1892 in Norwegian music – Dan W. Quinn makes first recordings in New York City; Kullervo by Jean Sibelius; Pagliacci by Ruggero Leoncavallo; The Nutcracker by Marius Petipa
- 1891 in music, 1891 in Norwegian music – Piano Trio No. 4 by Antonín Dvořák; Birth of Sergei Prokofiev, Soviet composer and pianist; George W. Johnson becomes first African American recording artist with "The Laughing Song"
- 1890 in music, 1890 in Norwegian music – John Philip Sousa makes first recordings with Columbia Phonograph Company; Birth of Bronislava Nijinska, choreographer

== 1880s ==
- 1889 in music, 1889 in Norwegian music – Effie Stewart records at Menlo Park; Edison starts commercial recordings on May 24; First phonograph parlor opens in San Francisco; Kaiser-Walzer by Johann Strauss II; Death and Transfiguration by Richard Strauss.
- 1888 in music, 1888 in Norwegian music – Symphony No. 2 by Gustav Mahler; Birth of Lead Belly; Death of Charles-Valentin Alkan, French composer and pianist; Wax phonograph cylinders commercially marketed; Emile Berliner invents lateral-cut disc records.
- 1887 in music, 1887 in Norwegian music – The Havanaise (Saint-Saëns) by Camille Saint-Saëns; Birth of Heitor Villa-Lobos, Brazilian composer, cellist, and guitarist
- 1886 in music, 1886 in Norwegian music – The Carnival of the Animals and the Symphony No. 3 by Camille Saint-Saëns; birth of Marcel Dupré, Al Jolson, Paul Paray, Othmar Schoeck; Franz Liszt publishes his final Hungarian Rhapsody; death of Franz Liszt.
- 1885 in music, 1885 in Norwegian music – The Mikado – Arthur Sullivan; The Gypsy Baron by Johann Strauss II; Birth of Jerome Kern
- 1884 in music, 1884 in Norwegian music – Birth of Sophie Tucker
- 1883 in music, 1883 in Norwegian music – Birth of Edgard Varèse, Death of Richard Wagner, German composer
- 1882 in music, 1882 in Norwegian music – Birth of Igor Stravinsky, Russian composer, Parsifal by Richard Wagner premieres in Bayreuth; Pyotr Ilyich Tchaikovsky – 1812 Overture premiere
- 1881 in music, 1881 in Norwegian music – Births of Béla Bartók and George Enescu
- 1880 in music, 1880 in Norwegian music – Stabat Mater and "Songs My Mother Taught Me" by Antonín Dvorák; The Violin Concerto No. 3 (Saint-Saëns) by Camille Saint-Saëns; Death of Jacques Offenbach, composer (b. 1819)

== 1870s ==
- 1879 in music, 1879 in Norwegian music – Birth of Jean Cras
- 1878 in music – Birth of George M. Cohan; William S. Gilbert and Arthur Sullivan, H.M.S. Pinafore; reshapes British and American musical theater;
- 1877 in music – Phonograph and phonograph cylinder invented by Thomas Alva Edison; Samson and Delilah by Camille Saint-Saëns Birth of Billy Murray (singer)
- 1876 in music – Siegfried and Götterdämmerung by Richard Wagner premiere in Bayreuth; Birth of Carl Ruggles
- 1875 in music – Birth of Joseph-Maurice Ravel, French composer and pianist; Carmen by Georges Bizet premieres in Paris; Swan Lake by Pyotr Ilyich Tchaikovsky premieres
- 1874 in music – Boris Godunov by Modest Mussorgsky premieres in Saint Petersburg; Die Fledermaus by Johann Strauss II premieres in Vienna; Richard Wagner concludes Götterdämmerung, finishing The Ring Cycle; Requiem by Giuseppe Verdi; Danse macabre by Camille Saint-Saëns; Birth of Arnold Schoenberg
- 1873 in music – Birth of Enrico Caruso, Sergei Rachmaninoff, Russian composer, ultra virtuoso pianist and conductor
- 1872 in music – The Cello Concerto No. 1 (Saint-Saëns) by Camille Saint-Saëns; Birth of Ralph Vaughan Williams, English composer; birth of Sergei Diaghilev, choreographer (d. 1929)
- 1871 in music – Richard Wagner concludes Siegfried; Aida by Giuseppe Verdi premieres in Cairo
- 1870 in music – Die Walküre (the Valkyrie) by Richard Wagner premieres in Munich

== 1860s ==
- 1869 in music – Death of Hector Berlioz, French composer, Das Rheingold by Richard Wagner premieres in Munich
- 1868 in music – Death of Gioachino Rossini, Italian composer, Die Meistersinger von Nürnberg by Richard Wagner premières in Munich; Ein deutsches Requiem by Johannes Brahms premières in Bremen; Wiegenlied by Brahms (Brahms' Lullaby); Tales from the Vienna Woods by Johann Strauss II; the Piano Concerto No. 2 (Saint-Saëns) by Camille Saint-Saëns
- 1867 in music Birth of Scott Joplin, famous ragtime composer; The Blue Danube by Johann Strauss II; Roméo et Juliette (opera) by Charles Gounod; Peer Gynt by Edvard Grieg
- 1866 in music – Franz Liszt completes his oratorio Christus; Birth of French composer Erik Satie.
- 1865 in music – Birth of Finnish composer Jean Sibelius; Tristan und Isolde by Richard Wagner premieres in Munich, marking the beginning of the end for traditional tonality; The Symphony No. 1 by Antonín Dvorak; Franz Liszt publishes his solo piano transcriptions of the full Beethoven Symphonies 1 – 9.
- 1864 in music Birth of Richard Strauss, German composer, Alberto Nepomuceno, Brazilian composer, pianist, organist and conductor
- 1863 in music– The Introduction and Rondo Capriccioso by Camille Saint-Saëns; Birth of Ernesto Nazareth
- 1862 in music – Birth of French composer Claude Debussy
- 1861 in music – Birth of Anton Arensky; Franz Liszt completes his first Mephisto Waltz The Dance in the Village Inn.
- 1860 in music – Birth of Gustav Mahler, Austrian composer and conductor

== 1850s ==
- 1859 in music – Faust by Charles Gounod premieres in Paris; Richard Wagner concludes Tristan und Isolde; In 1859, John Freeman Young published the English translation of "Silent Night" that is most frequently sung today.
- 1858 in music – Births of Medardo Rosso and Giacomo Puccini, Italian opera composer, Orphée aux enfers by Jacques Offenbach, the first operetta, premieres in Paris; Hector Berlioz writes Les Troyens; Johann Strauss II writes Tritsch-Tratsch-Polka
- 1857 in music – Birth of Edward Elgar, British composer; First public performance of Franz Liszt's Piano Sonata in B Minor
- 1856 in music – Death of Robert Schumann, German composer and pianist; Richard Wagner, German composer, concludes Die Walküre
- 1855 in music – Birth of Ernest Chausson
- 1854 in music – Richard Wagner, German composer, concludes Das Rheingold
- 1853 in music – Il trovatore by Giuseppe Verdi premieres in Rome; La traviata by Verdi premieres in Venice
- 1852 in music – Births of Charles Villiers Stanford, Irish composer, teacher and conductor and Francisco Tárrega, Spanish composer and guitarist
- 1851 in music – Rigoletto by Giuseppe Verdi premieres in Venice
- 1850 in music – Lohengrin by Richard Wagner premieres in Weimar; Foster's Plantation Melodies by Stephen Foster, including "Camptown Races"

== 1840s ==
- 1849 in music – Death of Frédéric Chopin, Polish composer and pianist; Franz Liszt publishes his Three Concert Études, alongside completing Funérailles.
- 1848 in music – Album for the Young by Robert Schumann; Death of Gaetano Donizetti, Italian opera composer
- 1847 in music – "Oh! Susanna" by Stephen Foster published; Death of Felix Mendelssohn-Bartholdy, German composer
- 1846 in music – Adolphe Sax invents the saxophone
- 1845 in music – Tannhäuser by Richard Wagner premières in Dresden; The Violin Concerto by Felix Mendelssohn; Birth of Ángela Peralta
- 1844 in music – Birth of Nikolai Rimsky-Korsakov and Charles-Marie Widor
- 1843 in music – Birth of Edvard Grieg, Norwegian composer (d. 1907); Minstrel show premieres in United States; Der fliegende Holländer by Richard Wagner premieres in Dresden
- 1842 in music – "Lisztomania" sweeps Europe
- 1841 in music – Birth of Antonín Dvořák, Czech composer; Nabucco by Giuseppe Verdi
- 1840 in music – Birth of Pyotr Ilyich Tchaikovsky, Russian composer; Death of Niccolò Paganini, Italian composer and ultra virtuoso violinist

== 1830s ==
- 1839 in music – Blumenstück by Robert Schumann
- 1838 in music – Kinderszenen by Robert Schumann
- 1837 in music – Requiem by Hector Berlioz
- 1836 in music – Birth of Carlos Gomes, Brazilian composer and opera composer, Les Huguenots by Giacomo Meyerbeer premieres in Paris
- 1835 in music – Death of Vincenzo Salvatore Carmelo Francesco Bellini, Italian opera composer, Lucia di Lammermoor by Gaetano Donizetti premieres in Naples; Gaetano Corticelli is in vogue in salons of Bologna, Italy featuring his terzettis and fantasies; I puritani by Vincenzo Bellini premieres
- 1834 in music – Die Neue Zeitschrift für Musik first published by Robert Schumann
- 1833 in music – Johannes Brahms born
- 1832 in music – Death of Muzio Clementi, Italian composer and pianist
- 1831 in music – La sonnambula and Norma by Vincenzo Bellini
- 1830 in music – Symphonie Fantastique by Hector Berlioz is written; The Hebrides (overture) by Felix Mendelssohn; Anna Bolena by Gaetano Donizetti; and I Capuleti e i Montecchi by Vincenzo Bellini

== 1820s ==
- 1829 in music – The Italian Symphony, the Scottish Symphony, and the Songs Without Words by Felix Mendelssohn; Birth of Anton Rubinstein, Russian composer and ultra virtuoso pianist
- 1828 in music – Franz Schubert dies
- 1827 in music – Ludwig van Beethoven dies; Winterreise by Franz Schubert; Il pirata by Vincenzo Bellini
- 1826 in music – June 5, Death of Carl Maria Friedrich Ernst von Weber, German opera composer. String Quartet No. 14 in C Sharp minor by Ludwig van Beethoven was completed. October 31, Muzio Clementi's complete Gradus ad Parnassum (100 pieces) appears for the first time, simultaneously in Paris, Leipzig and London.
- 1825 in music – Birth of Johann Strauss II, Austrian composer; Songs from Sir Walter Scott by Franz Schubert, including "Ellens dritter Gesang" (Schubert's Ave Maria); The Octet by Felix Mendelssohn Antonio Salieri dies
- 1824 in music – Birth of Anton Bruckner, Austrian composer and organist; Beethoven's 9th Symphony
- 1823 in music – Die schöne Müllerin by Franz Schubert
- 1822 in music
- 1821 in music – Der Freischütz by Carl Maria von Weber, premieres in Berlin
- 1820 in music

== 1810s ==
- 1819 in music – April 16, The publication of Muzio Clementi's Gradus ad Parnassum Volume II is entered at Stationer's Hall, London. September 13, Birth of Clara Schumann, German pianist and composer.
- 1818 in music – Hammerklavier sonate by Ludwig van Beethoven; "Silent Night" written by Josef Mohr and composed by Franz Xaver Gruber, – The first performance of Silent Night on December 25, (Church of St. Nikolaus in Oberndorf, Austria).
- 1817 in music – March 1, Muzio Clementi's Gradus ad Parnassum Volume I is published simultaneously in London, Paris and Leipzig.
- 1816 in music – Il barbiere di Siviglia (The Barber of Seville) by Gioachino Rossini, premieres in Rome
- 1815 in music
- 1814 in music – Symphony No. 8 by Ludwig van Beethoven
- 1813 in music – Birth of French-Jewish composer and ultra virtuoso pianist Charles-Valentin Alkan; Birth of German composer Richard Wagner; Birth of Italian composer Giuseppe Verdi, Symphony No. 7 by Ludwig van Beethoven
- 1812 in music – Birth of German composer Friedrich von Flotow; Birth of Swiss composer and virtuoso pianist Sigismund Thalberg.
- 1811 in music – Birth of Hungarian composer and virtuoso pianist Franz Liszt.
- 1810 in music – Birth of Polish composer and virtuoso pianist Frédéric Chopin; Birth of German composer and virtuoso pianist Robert Schumann; Ludwig van Beethoven completes his Fifth Piano Concerto Emperor.

== 1800s ==
- 1809 in music – Birth of Felix Mendelssohn-Bartholdy, German composer, pianist, organist and conductor; Death of Joseph Haydn, Austrian composer
- 1808 in music – Beethoven completes his 6th Symphony "Pastoral", Beethoven's 5th Symphony
- 1807 in music – La Vestale by Gaspare Spontini, Symphony No. 4 by Ludwig van Beethoven
- 1806 in music – Fourth Piano Concerto, Violin Concerto by Ludwig van Beethoven
- 1805 in music – Fidelio by Ludwig van Beethoven
- 1804 in music – Symphony No. 3 'Eroica' by Ludwig van Beethoven
- 1803 in music – Birth of Hector Berlioz, French composer Symphony No. 2 by Ludwig van Beethoven
- 1802 in music – Bach's Sonatas and partitas for solo violin are published by Bote and Bock
- 1801 in music – Birth of Vincenzo Salvatore Carmelo Francesco Bellini, Italian opera composer, Beethoven's Moonlight Sonata
- 1800 in music – Symphony No. 1 by Ludwig van Beethoven

== 1790s ==
- 1799 in music –
- 1798 in music – Joseph Haydn's The Creation
- 1797 in music – Joseph Haydn's Gott erhalte Franz den Kaiser; Birth of Franz Schubert, Austrian composer and pianist and Domenico Gaetano Maria Donizetti, Italian opera composer
- 1796 in music –
- 1795 in music – First Beethoven Piano Sonatas written (Op. 2)
- 1794 in music –
- 1793 in music – Scots Wha Hae
- 1792 in music – Birth of Gioachino Antonio Rossini, Italian composer
- 1791 in music – Mozart's Die Zauberflöte (The Magic Flute); death of Mozart
- 1790 in music –

== 1780s ==
- 1789 in music – Mozart's Così fan tutte
- 1788 in music – Death of Carl Philipp Emanuel Bach, German composer and keyboardist
- 1787 in music – Mozart's Don Giovanni
- 1786 in music – Birth of Carl Maria Friedrich Ernst von Weber, German opera composer, Mozart's Le nozze di Figaro (The marriage of Figaro)
- 1785 in music – Wolfgang Amadeus Mozart composes his Piano Concerto No. 21
- 1784 in music –
- 1783 in music –
- 1782 in music – Birth of Niccolò Paganini, Italian composer and ultra virtuoso violinist; Death of Johann Christian Bach, German composer, Mozart's Die Entführung aus dem Serail (The Abduction from the Seraglio)
- 1781 in music –
- 1780 in music –

== 1770s ==
- 1779 in music –
- 1778 in music –
- 1777 in music – Il mondo della luna by Joseph Haydn, premieres in Eszterháza, Hungary
- 1776 in music –
- 1775 in music –
- 1774 in music –
- 1773 in music –
- 1772 in music –
- 1771 in music –
- 1770 in music – Ludwig van Beethoven born

== 1760s ==
- 1769 in music –
- 1768 in music –
- 1767 in music –
- 1766 in music –
- 1765 in music –
- 1764 in music – Death of Jean-Philippe Rameau, French composer and music theorist
- 1763 in music –
- 1762 in music – Orfeo ed Euridice by Christoph Willibald Gluck, premieres in Vienna
- 1761 in music –
- 1760 in music – La buona figliuola by Niccolò Piccinni, premieres in Rome

== 1750s ==
- 1759 in music – George Frideric Handel dies
- 1758 in music –
- 1757 in music – Death of Domenico Scarlatti, Italian composer and harpsichordist
- 1756 in music – Wolfgang Amadeus Mozart born
- 1755 in music –
- 1754 in music –
- 1753 in music –
- 1752 in music – Muzio Clementi born
- 1751 in music –
- 1750 in music – Johann Sebastian Bach dies, Antonio Salieri born

== 1740s ==
- 1749 in music – Johann Sebastian Bach finishes his Mass in B Minor; George Frideric Handel composes the Music for the Royal Fireworks
- 1748 in music -
- 1747 in music – Johann Sebastian Bach finishes his Musical Offering
- 1746 in music –
- 1745 in music –
- 1744 in music – Johann Sebastian Bach finishes the Book II from The Well-Tempered Clavier
- 1743 in music –
- 1742 in music – première of Messiah by George Frideric Handel, in Dublin
- 1741 in music – Death of Antonio Lucio Vivaldi, Italian composer and violinist Bach's Goldberg Variations are published
- 1740 in music –

== 1730s ==
- 1739 in music – The Clavier-Übung III by Johann Sebastian Bach is published
- 1738 in music –
- 1737 in music –
- 1736 in music – Alexander's Feast by George Frideric Handel
- 1735 in music – Birth of Johann Christian Bach, German composer
- 1734 in music –
- 1733 in music – La serva padrona by Giovanni Battista Pergolesi, the first opera buffa, premieres in Naples; Hippolyte et Aricie by Jean-Philippe Rameau, premieres in Paris, Death of François Couperin, French composer and harpsichordist
- 1732 in music – Joseph Haydn born
- 1731 in music –
- 1730 in music –

== 1720s ==
- 1729 in music –
- 1728 in music – The Beggar's Opera by John Gay and Johann Christoph Pepusch, premieres in London
- 1727 in music – Zadok the Priest (the coronation anthem) by George Frideric Handel, Johann Sebastian Bach finishes and presents his St Matthew Passion
- 1726 in music –
- 1725 in music – publication of Twelve concerti, Op. 8 by Antonio Vivaldi, including the Four Seasons – Death of Alessandro Scarlatti, Italian composer
- 1724 in music – Giulio Cesare by George Frideric Handel premières in London, Johann Sebastian Bach presents his St John Passion
- 1723 in music – Vivaldi composes The Four Seasons
- 1722 in music – Johann Sebastian Bach finishes the Book I from The Well-Tempered Clavier, Traité de l'harmonie by Jean-Philippe Rameau causes a revolution in music theory.
- 1721 in music –
- 1720 in music – Johann Sebastian Bach presents his Brandenburg Concertos to Christian Ludwig; Johann Sebastian Bach completes the Sonatas and partitas for solo violin

== 1710s ==
- 1719 in music –
- 1718 in music –
- 1717 in music – Water Music by George Frideric Handel
- 1716 in music – Juditha triumphans is composed by Antonio Vivaldi
- 1715 in music –
- 1714 in music – Birth of Carl Philipp Emanuel Bach, German composer
- 1713 in music – Death: Arcangelo Corelli, Italian composer and violinist
- 1712 in music –
- 1711 in music – Rinaldo by Handel, premieres in London, the first all-Italian opera performed in London
- 1710 in music – Agrippina by Handel, premieres in Venice

== 1700s ==
- 1709 in music –
- 1708 in music –
- 1707 in music –
- 1706 in music – Johann Pachelbel dies
- 1705 in music –
- 1704 in music –
- 1703 in music –
- 1702 in music –
- 1701 in music –
- 1700 in music –

== 1690s ==
- 1699 in music –
- 1698 in music –
- 1697 in music –
- 1696 in music –
- 1695 in music – Henry Purcell dies
- 1694 in music –
- 1693 in music –
- 1692 in music –
- 1691 in music – King Arthur by Henry Purcell
- 1690 in music –

== 1680s ==
- 1689 in music – Dido and Aeneas, opera, by Henry Purcell and Nahum Tate (libretto) performed
- 1688 in music –
- 1687 in music – Death of Jean-Baptiste Lully, French composer
- 1686 in music –
- 1685 in music – Albion and Albanius, opera, by Louis Grabu; Birth of: Johann Sebastian Bach and Georg Friedrich Häendel (German composers, organists and harpsichordists); Domenico Scarlatti, Italian composer and harpsichordist
- 1684 in music –
- 1683 in music – Birth of Jean-Philippe Rameau, French composer and music theorist
- 1682 in music –
- 1681 in music –
- 1680 in music –

== 1670s ==
- 1679 in music –
- 1678 in music – Birth of Antonio Lucio Vivaldi, Italian composer and violinist
- 1677 in music –
- 1676 in music –
- 1675 in music – Psyche by Matthew Locke
- 1674 in music –
- 1673 in music –
- 1672 in music –
- 1671 in music –
- 1670 in music –

== 1660s ==
- 1669 in music –
- 1668 in music – Birth of François Couperin, French composer and harpsichordist
- 1667 in music –
- 1666 in music –
- 1665 in music –
- 1664 in music – Heinrich Schutz completes Weihnachtshistorie
- 1663 in music –
- 1662 in music –
- 1661 in music –
- 1660 in music – Birth of Alessandro Scarlatti, Italian composer and harpsichordist

== 1650s ==
- 1659 in music – Henry Purcell born
- 1658 in music –
- 1657 in music –
- 1656 in music –
- 1655 in music –
- 1654 in music –
- 1653 in music – Arcangelo Corelli, Johann Pachelbel born
- 1652 in music –
- 1651 in music – La Calisto by Francesco Cavalli
- 1650 in music –

== 1640s ==
- 1649 in music – Giasone by Francesco Cavalli, premieres in Venice, the first opera to separate aria and recitative
- 1648 in music –
- 1647 in music –
- 1646 in music –
- 1645 in music –
- 1644 in music – Ormindo by Francesco Cavalli, premieres in Venice
- 1643 in music – death of Claudio Monteverdi
- 1642 in music – L'incoronazione di Poppea by Claudio Monteverdi, premiered in Venice
- 1641 in music –
- 1640 in music – Il ritorno d'Ulisse in patria by Claudio Monteverdi, premieres in Venice

== 1630s ==
- 1639 in music –
- 1638 in music –
- 1637 in music – The first commercial opera house open to the public, Teatro San Cassiano, opens in Venice
- 1636 in music –
- 1635 in music –
- 1634 in music –
- 1633 in music –
- 1632 in music – Birth of Jean-Baptiste Lully, French composer
- 1631 in music –
- 1630 in music –

== 1620s ==
- 1629 in music –
- 1628 in music –
- 1627 in music –
- 1626 in music –
- 1625 in music –
- 1624 in music –
- 1623 in music –
- 1622 in music –
- 1621 in music –
- 1620 in music –

== 1610s ==
- 1619 in music – Michael Praetorius, Polyhymnia caduceatrix
- 1618 in music –
- 1617 in music – Johann Hermann Schein, Banchetto musicale
- 1616 in music –
- 1615 in music –
- 1614 in music – Marco da Gagliano, Sacrarum cantionum
- 1613 in music –
- 1612 in music –
- 1611 in music – William Byrd, Fantasia a 6, No. 3; Carlo Gesualdo, Morro lasso al mio duolo
- 1610 in music – Claudio Monteverdi, Vespro della Beata Vergine 1610

== 1600s ==
- 1609 in music –
- 1608 in music – Lamento d'Arianna by Claudio Monteverdi; Since Robin Hood by Thomas Weelkes
- 1607 in music – La Favola D'Orfeo by Claudio Monteverdi
- 1606 in music –
- 1605 in music – Van de Spiegheling der singconst (ca 1605) by Simon Stevin
- 1604 in music –
- 1603 in music –
- 1602 in music – Cento concerti by Lodovico Viadana, the first book to feature basso continuo
- 1601 in music – Le nuove musiche by Giulio Caccini
- 1600 in music – the first oratorio: Rappresentatione di Anima, et di Corpo by Emilio de' Cavalieri

== 1590s ==
- 1599 in music –
- 1598 in music –
- 1597 in music – John Dowland's First Book of Lute Songs; Dafne, the first known opera
- 1596 in music –
- 1595 in music –
- 1594 in music – Orlande de Lassus completes Lagrime di San Pietro (posthumously published); Orlande de Lassus dies
- 1593 in music –
- 1592 in music –
- 1591 in music –
- 1590 in music – Claudio Monteverdi, Il secondo libro de madrigali a 5

== 1580s ==
- 1589 in music –
- 1588 in music –
- 1587 in music –
- 1586 in music –
- 1585 in music –
- 1584 in music –
- 1583 in music –
- 1582 in music –
- 1581 in music – The court entertainment Ballet comique de la reine by Balthazar de Beaujoyeulx was presented on Oct 15
- 1580 in music – Appearance of three Fantasias for viol consort by William Byrd. Founding of Concerto delle donne under the direction of Luzzasco Luzzaschi: Consisting of women voices, this group becomes a significant part of Alfonso II d'Este's court entertainment.

== 1570s ==
- 1579 in music –
- 1578 in music –
- 1577 in music –
- 1576 in music –
- 1575 in music –
- 1574 in music –
- 1573 in music –
- 1572 in music –
- 1571 in music –
- 1570 in music –

== 1560s ==
- 1569 in music –
- 1568 in music –
- 1567 in music – Birth of Claudio Monteverdi, Italian composer and singer
- 1566 in music –
- 1565 in music –
- 1564 in music –
- 1563 in music –
- 1562 in music –
- 1561 in music –
- 1560 in music – First works for Viol Consort attributed to William Byrd

== 1550s ==
- 1559 in music –
- 1558 in music –
- 1557 in music –
- 1556 in music –
- 1555 in music –
- 1554 in music –
- 1553 in music –
- 1552 in music –
- 1551 in music –
- 1550 in music –

== 1540s ==
- 1549 in music –
- 1548 in music –
- 1547 in music –
- 1546 in music – Death of John Taverner, English composer.
- 1545 in music –
- 1544 in music –
- 1543 in music –
- 1542 in music –
- 1541 in music –
- 1540 in music – Birth of William Byrd, English composer; Thomas Tallis begins writing his first works for the Latin church service.

== 1530s ==
- 1539 in music – Jacques Arcadelt's First book of madrigals for four voices is published, the most reprinted madrigal book of the century
- 1538 in music – printing of the first Protestant hymn-book, Ein Hubsch new Gesangbuch; publication of the first book of madrigals by Maddalena Casulana, the first printed book of music by a woman in European history.
- 1537 in music –
- 1536 in music –
- 1535 in music –
- 1534 in music –
- 1533 in music –
- 1532 in music –
- 1531 in music –
- 1530 in music – Madrigali de diversi musici: libro primo de la Serena is published, the first book of madrigals to use the word 'madrigal' to describe them. The majority of the pieces in it are by Philippe Verdelot.

== 1520s ==
- 1529 in music –
- 1528 in music –
- 1527 in music –
- 1526 in music –
- 1525 in music – birth of Palestrina
- 1524 in music –
- 1523 in music –
- 1522 in music – death of Jean Mouton (c. 1459 – October 30, 1522)
- 1521 in music – death of Josquin
- 1520 in music – Musica di messer Bernardo Pisano sopra le canzone del Petrarcha is published, the first printed book of secular music dedicated to a single composer. It contains the first madrigals, though they are not called by that name.

== 1510s ==
- 1519 in music –
- 1518 in music –
- 1517 in music –
- 1516 in music –
- 1515 in music –
- 1514 in music –
- 1513 in music –
- 1512 in music –
- 1511 in music –
- 1510 in music – Josquin des Prez composes the Missa de Beata Virgine

== 1500s ==
- 1509 in music –
- 1508 in music –
- 1507 in music –
- 1506 in music –
- 1505 in music –
- 1504 in music –
- 1503 in music –
- 1502 in music –
- 1501 in music – publication of Harmonice Musices Odhecaton by Ottaviano Petrucci, the first printed collection of polyphonic music
- 1500 in music –

== Early history ==
=== 15th century ===
- 1490s in music – Josquin des Prez – Nymphes des bois; The Chigi codex is compiled.
- 1480s in music – Johannes Ockeghem completes Requiem; Josquin des Prez composes the Missa L'homme armé super voces musicales
- 1470s in music –
- 1460s in music – Anna Inglese sings at the festivities for the marriage of Galeazzo Maria Sforza, Duke of Milan and Bona of Savoy
- 1450s in music – Antoine Busnois writes the O Crux Lignum
- 1440s in music – Bianca de' Medici is born; Royal Danish Chapel is founded by Christian I.
- 1430s in music –
- 1420s in music –
- 1410s in music –
- 1400s in music –
- The Old Hall Manuscript is compiled

=== 14th century ===
- 1390s in music –
- 1380s in music –
- 1370s in music – Death of Guillaume de Machaut
- 1360s in music – Guillaume de Machaut composes Messe de Nostre Dame, the first complete polyphonic ordinary of the mass
- 1350s in music –
- 1340s in music –
- 1330s in music –
- 1320s in music –
- 1310s in music –
- 1300s in music – Edward I of England holds the Feast of the Swans at Westminster Abbey, with music involving over 150 minstrels from a number of European countries.

=== 13th century ===
- The Worcester Fragments are compiled.

=== 12th century ===
- The Magnus Liber is compiled by Léonin.
- The Codex Calixtinus is compiled.

=== 11th century ===
- The Victimae paschali laudes sequence, usually attributed to Wipo of Burgundy, is composed.

== Ancient music ==
- 1st millennium in music
- 1st millennium BC in music
- 2nd millennium BC in music
- 3rd millennium BC in music

== See also ==
- List of years in country music
- List of years in jazz
- List of years in rock music
- Table of years in music
