= 1848 in music =

== Events ==
- January 1–April 28 – Richard Wagner completes his opera Lohengrin.
- January – Franz Liszt takes up the full-time post of conductor to the Weimar court orchestra.
- March 18 – The premiere of Fry's Leonora in Philadelphia is the first known performance of a grand opera by an American composer.
- March 18–22 – Five Days of Milan: Uprising causes temporary closure of La Scala and postponement of the première of Mercadante's opera La schiava saracena.
- April 1 – Der Ring des Nibelungen: Composition of the poem: Richard Wagner first records his intention to write the music drama that becomes Der Ring des Nibelungen ("The Ring of the Nibelung").
- April 21–November 23 – Frédéric Chopin visits London and Scotland.
- May 13 – "Maamme", the national anthem of Finland, written by German-born composer Fredrik Pacius and Swedish-speaking Finnish poet Johan Ludvig Runeberg, is performed for the first time.
- June – Bedřich Smetana briefly helps man the barricades on the Charles Bridge in Prague during the revolutions of 1848 in the Austrian Empire, having written some patriotic works in the spirit of the time.
- July 25 – The National Anthem of Uruguay is officially declared.
- September – Charles Hallé is invited to Manchester, having moved from Paris to Britain due to the French Revolution of 1848.
- October (late) – Chopin writes his last will and testament at a friend's house in Edinburgh.
- November 16 – Chopin makes his last public appearance on a concert platform, at the Guildhall, London.
- Returning from exile, Cuban dance band leader Claudio Brindis de Salas is imprisoned for two years by the island's authorities.
- Giuseppe Verdi wishes to replace soprano Eugenia Tadolini as Lady Macbeth for the first Naples performance of his opera Macbeth on the grounds that her voice and appearance are too beautiful. This year she creates two new rôles, Giovanna in Carlo Boniforti's Giovanna di Fiandra (February 8 at La Scala, Milan) and Paolina in Donizetti's Poliuto (November 30 at the Teatro di San Carlo, Naples) and makes her London debut as a lead singer in the title role of Donizetti's Linda di Chamounix opposite Sims Reeves at Her Majesty's Theatre (March).

== Classical music ==
- Ida Henriette da Fonseca – Aly og Gulhyndy
- Louis Moreau Gottschalk - Bamboula
- Franz Liszt
  - Ballade No. 1
  - Romance S.169
- George Onslow – Quintet for Piano and Strings No. 2 in G major
- Jules Perrot – Faust, ballet
- Alfredo Piatti – Air Baskyrs, Op. 8
- Pietro Raimondi – Putifar-Giuseppe-Giacobbe (oratorio)
- Adrien Francois Servais – Le Barbier de Séville, Op. 6
- Robert Schumann – Bilder aus Osten, Op. 66
- Johann Strauss I – Radetzky March

== Opera ==
- Giuseppe Verdi – Il corsaro
- William Henry Fry - Leonora (the first known performance of an opera by an American composer on March 18, 1845)

== Popular music ==
- "Give Me My Arrows And Give Me My Bow" by Samuel Lover
- "Oh! Susanna!" by Stephen Foster
- "Ben Bolt" by Nelson Kneass
- "Simple Gifts"

== Musical theater ==
- Maritana New York production opened at the Bowery Theatre on May 4 and ran for 3 performances

== Births ==
- January 21 – Henri Duparc, composer (died 1933)
- February 27 – Hubert Parry, composer, teacher and music historian (died 1918)
- March 15 – William J. McCoy, composer (died 1926)
- April 17 – Louis C. Elson, American music critic, writer on music, editor, journalist, composer, and professor of music theory (died 1920)
- April 28 – Ludvig Schytte, Danish composer, pianist, and teacher (died 1909)
- June 1 – Otto Malling, organist and composer (died 1915)
- July 11 – Joaquim Antônio da Silva Calado, choro composer and flautist (died 1880)
- July 31 – Robert Planquette, composer and songwriter (died 1903)
- August 1 – František Kmoch, conductor and composer (died 1912)
- September 15 – Wilhelm Fitzenhagen, cellist and composer (died 1890)
- October 8 – Pierre De Geyter, composer (died 1932)
- November 11 – William Seidel, band instrument manufacturer (died 1922)
- November 26 – Mark Warshawsky, Yiddish-language folk poet and composer. (died 1907)
- December 27 – George Ratcliffe Woodward, composer (died 1934)
- December 30
  - Frances Allitsen, composer (died 1912)
  - David Jenkins, composer (died 1915)

== Deaths ==
- January 5 – Ferdinando Orlandi, opera composer (b. 1774)
- January 23 – Márk Rózsavölgyi, violinist and composer (b. 1789)
- January 31 – Thomas Welsh, singer and composer (b. c. 1780)
- February 16 – Sophie Stebnowska, singer, actress and harpsichordist (b. 1753)
- March 29 – Hugo Staehle, composer (b. 1826)
- April 8
  - Louis Adam, pianist and composer (b. 1758)
  - Gaetano Donizetti, composer (b. 1797) (syphilis)
- April 24 – François van Campenhout, opera singer, conductor and composer (b. 1779)
- May 10 – Eliodoro Bianchi, Italian opera singer (b. 1773)
- August 5 (or 6) – Nicola Vaccai, opera composer (b. 1790)
- October 27 – Alexander Egorovich Varlamov, composer, early exponent of the Russian art song (b. 1801)
- date unknown – Timothy Olmstead, psalmodist (b. 1759)
