= 1854 in music =

List of years in music	(table)
- … 1844; 1845; 1846; 1847; 1848; 1849; 1850; 1851; 1852; 1853; 1854; 1855; 1856; 1857; 1858; 1859; 1860; 1861; 1862; 1863; 1864 …
- Art; Archaeology; Architecture; Literature; Music; Philosophy; Science; +...

== Events ==
- February 27 – Robert Schumann attempts suicide by throwing himself from a bridge into the River Rhine.
- June 13 – Anthony Faas patents the 1st US accordion, having made improvements to both the keyboard, and to enhance the sound (11,062). US patent No.US11062A
- Anton Rubinstein begins a four-year concert tour of Europe, establishing his reputation as the leading piano virtuoso of his generation.
- Richard Wagner completes Das Rheingold.

== Published popular music ==
- "Hard Times Come Again No More" w.m. Stephen Collins Foster
- "(I Dream of) Jeanie With the Light Brown Hair" w.m. Stephen Collins Foster
- "Maggie by My Side" Stephen Collins Foster
- "Old Dog Tray" Stephen Collins Foster
- "What Is Home Without A Mother" w.m. Septimus Winner
- "Willie We Have Missed You" Stephen Collins Foster

== Classical music ==
- Hector Berlioz – L'enfance du Christ
- Charles Gounod – Chant de paix
- Franz Liszt
  - Les préludes
  - Première année: Suisse
- Robert Schumann - Geistervariationen
- Henri Wieniawski – Le carnaval russe for violin and piano
- Johannes Brahms
  - Piano Trio No. 1, Op. 8 (revised in 1889)
  - Variations on a Theme by Robert Schumann in F-sharp minor, Op. 9, for piano. The theme is from Bunte Blätter.
  - Ballades, Op. 10
  - Fourteen Variations on a Hungarian Melody, in D major, Op. 21 No. 2
- Charles Sandys Packer – "City of Sydney Polka"

== Opera ==
- Karel Miry – La Lanterne magique (opera in 3 acts, libretto by Hippoliet van Peene, premiered on March 10 in Ghent)
- Franz Schubert – Alfonso und Estrella (premiered June 24 by Franz Liszt in Weimar, thirty-two years after it was composed)

== Births ==
- January 21 – Georges Ernest Street, composer (died 1908)
- January 31 – William Hall Sherwood, composer (died 1911)
- February 5 – Laura Emeline Newell, hymnist and songwriter (died 1916)
- March 10 – Dolores Paterno, composer (died 1881)
- March 14 – Fred Whishaw, musician (died 1934)
- April 13
  - António D'Andrade, opera singer (d. 1942)
  - William Henry Drummond, lyricist (died 1907)
- April 30 – Alexandre Rey Colaço, pianist (died 1928)
- May 1 – Percy French, songwriter (died 1920)
- May 5 – Antonio Smareglia, composer (died 1929)
- May 6 – Laura Joyce Bell, contralto singer and actress (d. 1904)
- May 13 – Paul Klengel, violinist (died 1935)
- May 15 – Pavel Pabst, pianist (died 1897)
- May 17 – Georges Gillet, oboist (died 1920)
- May 18 – Bernard Zweers, composer (died 1924)
- June 14 – Frederik Rung, composer (died 1914)
- June 19 – Alfredo Catalani, composer (died 1893)
- June 27 – Ladislao Bonus, Filipino composer (died 1908)
- July 3 – Leoš Janáček, composer (d. 1928)
- July 10 – John Lloyd Williams, musician (died 1945)
- July 14 – Alexander Kopylov, violinist and composer (d. 1911)
- August 23 – Moritz Moszkowski, composer (died 1925)
- August 24 – Alfred Dudley Turner, composer (some sources have b.1853) (d.1888)
- October 16 – Oscar Wilde, poet and lyricist (died 1900)
- October 22 – James A. Bland, minstrel performer (died 1911)
- October 30 – Julie Rivé-King, pianist (died 1937)
- September 1 – Engelbert Humperdinck, composer (d. 1921)
- September 22 – Ovide Musin, violinist (died 1929)
- November 1 – W. Paris Chambers, composer (died 1913)
- November 6 – John Philip Sousa, composer (d. 1932)
- November 14 – Dina Edling, opera singer (d. 1935)

== Deaths ==
- January 12 – Philip Klitz, composer (born 1805)
- February 4 – Iwan Müller, clarinetist (born 1786)
- March 3 – Giovanni Battista Rubini, operatic tenor (born 1794)
- March 26 – Emilie Hammarskjöld, pianist, singer and composer (born 1821)
- April 18 – Józef Elsner, composer and teacher (born 1769)
- April 30 – James Montgomery, hymnist (born 1771)
- May 1 – Jean Coralli, dancer and choreographer (born 1779)
- May 3 – William Beale, composer (born 1784)
- May 18 – Henry Lemoine, composer and music publisher (born 1786)
- May 31 – Vatroslav Lisinski, composer (born 1819)
- June 17 – Henriette Sontag, operatic soprano (born 1806) (cholera)
- July 14 – Louis-Pierre Norblin, cellist (born 1781)
- August 21 – August Ferdinand Anacker, composer (born 1790)
- October – Luigi Tarisio, violin dealer and collector (born c. 1790)
- November 2 – Anton Pann, poet, musicologist and composer (born c. 1790)
- November 17 – Alberich Zwyssig, composer of the Swiss national anthem (born 1808)
