= Alan Shulman =

American composer and cellist (1915–2002)

Alan Shulman (4 June 1915 – 10 July 2002) was an American composer and cellist. He wrote a considerable amount of symphonic music, chamber music, and jazz music. Trumpeter Eddie Bailey said, "Alan had the greatest ear of any musician I ever came across. He had better than perfect pitch. I've simply never met anyone like him." Some of his more well known works include his 1940 Neo-Classical Theme and Variations for Viola and Piano and his A Laurentian Overture, which was premiered by the New York Philharmonic in 1952 under the baton of Guido Cantelli. Also of note is his 1948 Concerto for Cello and Orchestra which was also premiered by the New York Philharmonic with cellist Leonard Rose and conductor Dimitri Mitropoulos. Many of Shulman's works have been recorded, and the violinist Jascha Heifetz and jazz clarinetist Artie Shaw have been particular exponents of his work both in performance and on recordings.

== Biography ==
=== Early life and education ===
Shulman was born in Baltimore, Maryland, the son of a Russian immigrant father and Jewish mother. His father, who died when Shulman was one and a half, worked as a pharmacist and was a skilled amateur flautist. He had two siblings, Sylvan Shulman, who became a violinist, and Violet Shulman, who became a pianist. When Alan was 8, the siblings formed the Shulman Trio and performed in concerts throughout the Baltimore area. They were some of the earliest musicians to perform in radio commercials. All three children attended the Peabody Conservatory where they studied under Louis Cheslock and Alan, who started his training there at age 10, studied the cello under Bart Wirtz. Shulman wrote his first music composition during his first year studying at the Peabody Conservatory.

At the age of 14, Shulman and his family relocated to Brooklyn, New York. He attended Erasmus Hall High School between 1928 and 1929 and Brooklyn Vocational High School between 1929 and 1932. In 1929 he won a scholarship from the New York Philharmonic which enabled him to continue his music studies further with cellist Joseph Emonts and composer Winthrop Sargeant for the next three years. He played with the National Orchestral Association under conductor Léon Barzin from 1929 to 1932.

Shulman joined Chapter 802 of the American Federation of Musicians in 1931. He entered the Juilliard School in 1932 where he studied for five years, principally under cellist Felix Salmond and composers Albert Stoessel and Bernard Wagenaar. While a student he began performing with a string quartet that played popular music for the NBC network in 1933. He also worked as the group's arranger. He joined the Kreiner String Quartet in 1935, playing with them through 1938. He also started writing his first serious compositions during this time, notably writing music for the American Children's Theatre production of Hans Christian Andersen's The Chinese Nightingale in 1934. Upon graduating in 1937, he pursued further studies with cellist Emanuel Feuermann in 1939 and composer Paul Hindemith in 1942.

=== Early career ===
During the 1930s and 1940s Shulman worked actively as an arranger for such people as Leo Reisman, Andre Kostelanetz, Arthur Fiedler, and Wilfred Pelletier. In 1942 he became a member of the American Society of Music Arrangers and Composers. During the mid-1940s, he taught orchestration to Nelson Riddle who later garnered fame as an arranger for singers Frank Sinatra, Ella Fitzgerald and Nat King Cole.

In 1937 the Shulman brothers joined the brand new NBC Symphony Orchestra which was established by David Sarnoff of the National Broadcasting Company especially for conductor Arturo Toscanini. The following year Alan and Sylvan were among the founding members of the New Friends of Rhythm, a symphonic jazz group that made many recordings between 1939 and 1947, including several by Shulman. Other members of the group included harpist Laura Newell, jazz clarinetists Buster Bailey and Hank D'Amico, and singer Maxine Sullivan among others. Also in 1938, the two brothers established the Stuyvesant String Quartet, which remained active through 1954. The string quartet excelled in performing and recording contemporary works by such composers as Ernest Bloch, Sergei Prokofiev, Gian Francesco Malipiero, Hindemith and Fritz Kreisler. They notably played the American premiere of Dmitri Shostakovich's Piano Quintet at Carnegie Hall in 1941. Musicologist Tully Potter, a string-specialist, said the following:

The Shulman brothers were among a small group of fabulously gifted New York-based string players whose careers showed a constant tug between earning a living – which often led them into orchestral and session work – and doing something more artistic. It was a nightmare trying to run a string quartet in the United States, where distances were so great and there was not the infrastructure of music societies that existed in Europe. Had the Stuyvesant Quartet been privately sponsored, as some American groups were, or given a residency, it would be remembered today as one of the best of its time. As it was, it left a small but valuable corpus of recordings – and a recent reissue proved that the best of these performances have lost nothing of their power.

In 1941, Shulman's Theme and Variations for Viola and Orchestra was premiered by the NBC Symphony Orchestra with violist Emanuel Vardi. The work was Shulman's first major success and it is now considered a standard part of the viola repertoire. The following year he left the NBC Symphony Orchestra when he decided to join the United States Maritime Service with the intent of becoming a United States Merchant Marine. After receiving his training he spent the next several years serving in the USMM at Sheepshead Bay, between 1943 and 1945. During this time he was still able to pursue musical interests and work during his off hours. In 1944 his Suite on American Folk Songs premiered at Carnegie Hall with violinist Eudice Shapiro and pianist Vivian Rivkin. That same year his Pastorale and Dance was played for the first time by Sylvan on ABC Radio. The work received its concert premiere three years later with Oscar Shumsky and the Baltimore Symphony. Shulman also worked frequently with soprano Rise Stevens during the mid-1940s, arranging five cross-over albums for her between 1945 and 1947 in addition to other projects.

=== Middle life and career ===
After the war, Shulman married the pianist Sophie Pratt Bostelmann on 17 September 1946. They had met previously while they were both students at Juilliard. Their first child, Jay, a cellist, was born in 1949, followed by his daughter Laurie, a musicologist, in 1951, his son Marc, a guitarist, in 1953, and his daughter Lisa in 1956. Shulman returned to his position at the NBC Symphony Orchestra in 1948. That same year he became a member of the American Society of Composers, Authors and Publishers. The following year the NBC Symphony Orchestra premiered his Waltzes for Orchestra under conductor Milton Katims at Carnegie Hall. In 1950 his string quartet Threnody, written in honor of Israel's fallen soldiers, was premiered by the NBC String Quartet during Jewish Music Week. In 1954 the NBC Symphony Orchestra disbanded when Toscanini retired, and Shulman, along with several other members of the Symphony Orchestra, formed a new ensemble for NBC called the "Symphony of the Air". He remained with the Symphony of the Air for three years.

During the 1950s Shulman wrote numerous popular songs with entertainer Steve Allen and he did several arrangements for Skitch Henderson, Raoul Poliakin and Felix Slatkin. In 1956 he wrote his Suite Miniature for Octet of Celli which was commissioned by the Fine Arts Cello Ensemble of Los Angeles. That same year he was one of several musicians to found the Violoncello Society, later serving as the organization's president from 1967 to 1972. In 1959, during the midst of the Cold War, he was asked to join a Soviet-American composers' symposium organised by Nicolas Slonimsky for NBC. In addition to Shulman, the symposium included Americans Roy Harris and Howard Hanson and Russians Dmitri Shostakovich and Dmitry Kabalevsky.

=== Later life and career ===
Shulman played actively in chamber music with the Philharmonia Trio from 1962 to 1969 and the Haydn Quartet from 1972 until his wife's death in 1982. During his career he has also served on the faculties at Sarah Lawrence College, the Juilliard School, the State University of New York at Purchase, Johnson State College, and the University of Maine. Shulman retired in 1987 due to declining health. He died of complications from a stroke in a nursing home in Hudson, New York in 2002.

== Selected works ==
Orchestra

- Waltzes (1949)
- Hatikvah (1949); arrangement for orchestra
- A Laurentian Overture (1951)
- Popacatepetl (1952)
- Prelude (1952)
- Hup-Two-Three-Four, Jazz March (1953)
- Ricky Tic Serenade (1954)
- In Memoriam Sophie (1982)
- Woodstock Waltzes for chamber orchestra (1985)
- Quilt (1986)

String orchestra

- A Nocturne for Strings (1938)
- Four Moods (1942); also for string quartet
- Threnody (1950); also for string quartet: Allegro, Intermezzo and Scherzo
- Portrait of Lisa (1954)
- Viennese Lace (1954)
- The Bop Gavotte (1954)
- Minuet for Moderns (1954)
- An Elizabethan Legend (1954)
- Ben Franklin Suite (1963)
- A New England Tarantella (1978)
- Ripe for Plucking (1987)

Wind ensemble

- Top Brass, Six Minutes for Twelve, Suite for brass ensemble (1958)
- Two Chorales for Brass for brass ensemble (1962)
- The Three Faces of Glen Cove for concert band (1968)
- Interstate 90 for symphonic winds (1968)
- The Corn Shuckers, March-Scherzo for concert band (1969)

Concertante

- Theme and Variations for viola and orchestra or piano (1940) or for viola, string orchestra and harp (1954)
- Poem for violin and orchestra or piano (1941)
- Pastorale and Dance for violin and orchestra (1944)
- Concerto for Cello and Orchestra (1948)
- Cadenzas for Mozart's Flute and Harp Concerto, K. 299 (1954)
- Kol Nidre for cello and orchestra or string quartet (1970)
- Variations for viola, string orchestra and harp (1984)

Chamber music

- Homage to Erik Satie for cello or viola and piano (1938)
- Waltz (Valse) for violin and piano (1939)
- Piece in Popular Style for viola and piano (1939)
- Lament for cello and piano (1939)
- Mood in Question for clarinet, string quartet and harp (1939)
- High Voltage for clarinet, string quartet, double bass, guitar and harp (1939)
- Serenade for cello and piano (1941)
- Four Moods for string quartet (1942); also for string orchestra
- Cradle Song for harp (1943); also for piano
- Folk Songs for Winds for wind quintet (1943)
- Suite Based on American Folk Songs for violin and piano (1944)
  1. Fare Ye Well, My Darlin'
  2. Little Bird
  3. The Mermaid
  4. Cod Liver 'Ile
  5. Johnny Stiles
  6. What Shall I Do with a Drunken Sailor?
- Rendezvous ("Rendezvous with Benny") for clarinet and string quartet (1946)
- Platter Chatter for clarinet, string quartet, double bass, guitar and harp (1946)
- J.S. on the Rocks (Nightcap) for clarinet, string quartet, double bass, guitar and harp (1947)
- Vodka Float (Sailor's Dance) for clarinet, string quartet, double bass, guitar and harp (1947)
- Suite for Solo Cello (1950)
- Allegro, Intermezzo and Scherzo for string quartet (1950); also for string orchestra: Threnody
- Suite for Solo Viola (1953)
- Suite Miniature for 8 cellos (1956)
- 3 – 4 – J ("Three for Jay") for cello and piano (1960)
- Five Duos for Student and Teacher for 2 cellos (1960)
- Suite for the Young 'Cellist for cello and piano (1961)
- Three Sketches for double bass and piano (1963)
- Pastorale for 4 cellos (1964)
- Two Pair for 4 cellos (1964)
- Theme and Variations for 2 violins (1967); New Directions for Strings
- Duet for violin and viola or cello (1967); New Directions for Strings
- Study in 5ths for violin, or viola, or cello (1967); New Directions for Strings
- Passacaglia, Transcription from J.S. Bach for cello ensemble (1968)
- Aria from J.S. Bach's organ Pastorale in F major for 4 cellos (1969)
- Sarabande from J.S. Bach's English Suite No.3 for 4 cellos (1974)
- Berkshire Mist for 4 cellos (1975)
- Two Episodes for 4 violas (1978)
  1. Night
  2. Ancora
- Canadian Folksongs for 4 violins or violin ensemble (1978)
- Lament II for cello and piano (1983)

Piano

- Cradle Song (1943); also for harp
- Dripping Faucet, March (1959)
- Lopsided (1959)
- March (1960)
- Hues of Blues (1961)
- One Man Show, 9 short works (1961)
- Mexican Mountain Climb (1962)
- Sonatina for Sophie (1963)
- Jazz Grab Bag (1975)

Vocal

- Song of the Moon Festival in the Woods for voice and piano (1934); words by John Milton
- Tess' Lament for voice and piano (1959)

Film scores

- Tennessee Valley Authority (1946)
- Freedom and Famine (1946)
- Port of New York (1946)
- Behind Your Radio Dial (1948)
- The Tattooed Stranger (1950)
