= 1880 in music =

This article is about music-related events in 1880.

== Specific locations ==
- 1880 in Norwegian music

== Events ==
- April 3 – Gilbert and Sullivan's comic opera The Pirates of Penzance has its London premiere at the Opera Comique on the Strand.
- June 12 – Richard Strauss completes composition of his first major work, his Symphony in D minor, at age 16.
- June–August – Gustav Mahler takes his first professional conducting job, in a small wooden theatre in the Austrian spa town of Bad Hall, conducting operetta.
- November 1 – Mahler completes composition of Das klagende Lied.
- November 27 – The Teatro Costanzi in Rome is inaugurated with a performance of Rossini's opera Semiramide.

== Published popular music ==
- "The Beauty of Limerick" – David Braham
- "Blow the Man Down" trad
- "Funiculì Funiculà" w. G. Turco m. Luigi Denza
- "Keep the Horseshoe Over the Door" w. m. Joseph P. Skelly
- "Haste to the Wedding" published by Jean White
- "In The Evening By The Moonlight" w. m. James A. Bland
- "O Canada!" w. Adolphe-Basile Routhier m. Calixa Lavallée
- "Roses from the South" m. Johann Strauss II
- "Sailing, Sailing" w.m. Godfrey Marks
- "Softly and Tenderly" w.m. Will L. Thompson
- From The Pirates of Penzance, w. W. S. Gilbert m. Arthur Sullivan
  - "Away, Away! My Heart's On Fire"
  - "Now for The Pirates' Lair"
  - "Oh, Better Far To Live And Die"
  - "A Rollicking Band Of Pirates, We"
  - "To Gain A Brief Advantage"
  - "When A Felon's Not Engaged"
  - "When The Foeman Bares His Steel"
  - "When You Had Left Our Pirate Fold"
  - "Yes! I Am Brave! Oh, Family Descent"
- "Come and meet me, Rosa darling," w. by Samuel N. Mitchell, m. by William A. Huntley

== Classical music ==
- Ján Levoslav Bella – String Quartet No. 2 in C minor
- Giovanni Bottesini – Gran Duo Concertante
- Johannes Brahms
  - Tragic Overture
  - Academic Festival Overture
  - 2 Rhapsodies, Op.79, premiered January 20 in Krefeld.
- Alfons Czibulka – Stephanie-Gavotte, Op.312
- Felix Draeseke – Weihestunden. Six songs for baritone (or mezzo-soprano) and piano
- Antonín Dvořák
  - Waltzes, Op.54
  - Violin Sonata, Op. 57 (B. 106)
  - Symphony No. 6 in D major, Op. 60 (B. 112)
  - Songs My Mother Taught Me
- Gabriel Fauré – Élégie, for cello and piano
- César Franck – Piano Quintet, premiered January 17
- Niels Gade – Concerto for Violin and Orchestra in D minor, Op.56
- Edvard Grieg – 2 Elegiac Melodies, Op.34
- Gustav Mahler - Symphony No. 1
- Emilie Mayer – Faust Overture
- Ion Ivanovici – The Danube Waves
- Hubert Parry – Piano Concerto
- Giacomo Puccini – Messa di Gloria
- Hans Rott – Symphony in E major
- Camille Saint-Saëns
  - Suite algérienne in C major
  - Violin Concerto No. 3
  - Septet
- Pablo Sarasate – Spanish Dances for violin and piano, Book III
- Richard Strauss – Symphony in D minor
- Pyotr Ilyich Tchaikovsky
  - 1812 Overture
  - Italian Capriccio, Op.45, premiered December 18 in Moscow.
  - Serenade for Strings

== Opera ==
- Dudley Buck – Deseret, or A Saint's Affliction
- Léo Delibes – Jean de Nivelle
- Miguel Marqués – Florinda
- Adolf Neuendorff – The Rat-Charmer of Hamelin/Der Rattenfänger von Hameln
- Anton Rubinstein – The Merchant Kalashnikov
- George Stephănescu
  - Peste Dunare
  - Sinziana si Pepelea
- Johann Strauss, Jr. – Das Spitzentuch der Königin, premiered October 10 in Vienna.

== Musical theater ==
- La Mascotte Paris production
- The Pirates of Penzance London production

== Published Writings ==
- Alexander John Ellis – The History of Musical Pitch

== Births ==
- January 3 – Lina Abarbanell, German-American singer and actress (d. 1963)
- January 5 – Nikolai Medtner, Russian pianist and composer. (d. 1951)
- January 6 – John McKenna, traditional Irish flute player (d. 1947)
- February 19 – Arthur Shepherd, American composer (d. 1958)
- April 7 – Fritz Grünbaum, Austrian Caberet artist (murdered 1941)
- June 13 – Vincent Rose, Italian-born American bandleader and composer (d. 1944)
- July 5 – Jan Kubelík, Czech violinist (d. 1940)
- July 24 – Ernest Bloch, Swiss-born American Jewish composer (d. 1959)
- July 31 – Manuel Penella, Spanish composer (d. 1939)
- September 19 – Zequinha de Abreu, Brazilian musician and composer (d. 1935)
- September 20 – Ildebrando Pizzetti, Italian composer (d. 1968)
- September 27 – Jacques Thibaud, French violinist (d. 1953)
- October 12 – Healey Willan, English-born Canadian composer (d. 1968)
- November 2
  - John Foulds, English-born composer (d. 1939)
  - Brian Hooker, American lyricist and librettist (died 1946)
- Aunt Molly Jackson, American folk singer and union activist (d. 1960)

== Deaths ==
- January 24 – George Jackson Lambert, English organist and composer (born 1794)
- February 18 – Christina Enbom, Swedish operatic soprano (born 1804)
- March 20 – Joaquim Antônio da Silva Calado, choro composer and flautist (born 1848)
- March 31 – Henryk Wieniawski, violinist and composer (born 1835) (heart attack)
- May 1 – Samuel Naumbourg, composer (born 1817)
- May 9 – Hermann Berens, composer (born 1826)
- May 30 – James Planché, word artist (born 1796)
- August 16 – Ernst Ferdinand Wenzel (born 1808)
- August 17 – Ole Bull, Norwegian violinist (born 1810)
- October 5 – Jacques Offenbach, composer (born 1819)
- October 7 – Fredrika Stenhammar, operatic soprano (born 1836)
- November 24 – Napoléon Henri Reber, composer (born 1807)
- November 27 – William Saurin Lyster, opera impresario (born 1828)
- December 2 – Josephine Lang, composer (born 1815)
- December 27 – Alessandro Nini, composer (born 1805)
- date unknown – Knut Eriksson Helland, Hardanger fiddle maker (born 1851)
