= 1847 in music =

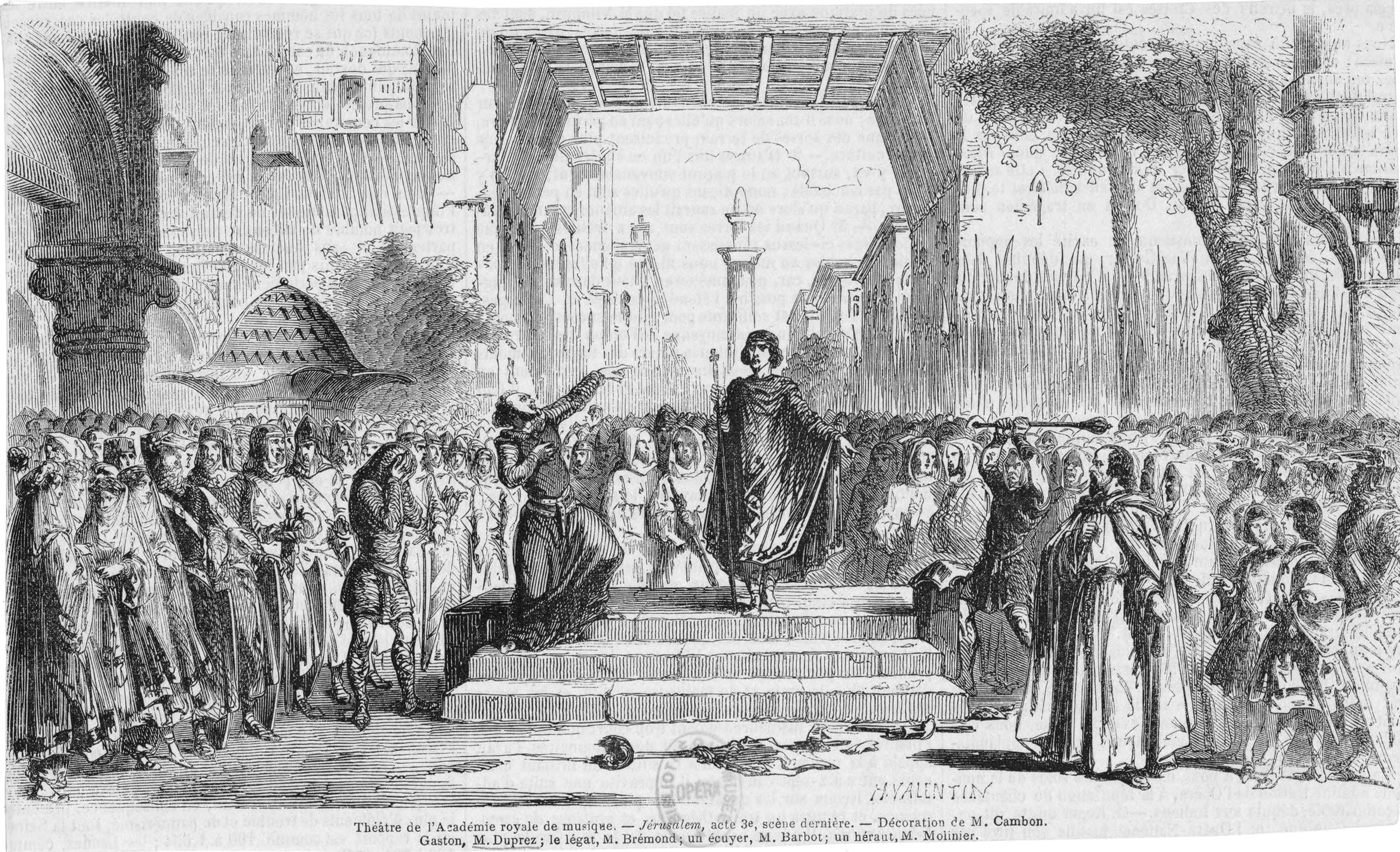

== Events ==
- February 28 – Fire breaks out during a performance and destroys the Großherzoglichen Hoftheater in Baden. Most of the audience perishes because the theatre doors cannot be opened from the inside.
- March 3 – I Lombardi alla prima crociata is performed at Palmo's Opera House in New York City, the first presentation of a Verdi opera in the United States.
- March 14 – Verdi's Macbeth is premiėred at the Teatro della Pergola in Florence, Italy.
- September – Franz Liszt gives up performing in public.

== Publications ==
- Vladimir Stasov publishes a monograph on Mikhail Glinka's use of folk motifs in his music.

== Popular music ==
- "Cantique de Noël" ("O Holy Night") w. (Fr) Placide Cappeau (Eng) John Sullivan Dwight m. Adolphe Adam
- "Dinah Dear" by Philip Klitz
- "Miss Ginger" by Philip Klitz
- "Roll On Silver Moon" by Joseph W. Turner

== Classical music ==
- Franz Berwald – A Rustic Wedding
- Frederic Chopin
  - Waltz Opus 64 No.1 (Minute)
  - Waltz Op. 64. No. 2
  - Cello Sonata
- August Freyer – Concert Variations, Op.2
- Franz Liszt
  - Hungarian Rhapsody No. 2
  - Glanes de Woronince
  - Most of the Harmonies poétiques et religieuses
- Felix Mendelssohn – String Quartet No. 6
- Jacques Offenbach – Concerto Militaire for cello and orchestra
- Robert Schumann
  - Symphony No. 2
  - Piano Trio No. 1
- Henryk Wieniawski – Grand Caprice Fantastique Op. 1

== Opera ==
- Francisco Asenjo Barbieri – Il Buontempone
- Giovanni Bottesini – Cristoforo Colombo
- Friedrich von Flotow – Martha
- Ivar Hallstrom – Hvita frun på Drottningholm (libretto by Frans Hedberg)
- Karel Miry – Brigitta (opera in 3 acts, libretto by Hippoliet van Peene, premiered on June 27 in Ghent)
- Jacques Offenbach - L'alcôve
- Giuseppe Verdi – Macbeth
- William Vincent Wallace – Matilda of Hungary

== Births ==
- January 1 – Rudolf Tillmetz, flute virtuoso, music teacher and composer (d. 1915)
- February 15 – Robert Fuchs, composer and music teacher (d. 1927)
- March 2 – Richard Temple, singer, actor and theatre director (d. 1912)
- March 9 – Axel Grandjean, conductor and composer (d. 1932)
- June 28 – Sveinbjörn Sveinbjörnsson, composer (d. 1927)
- July 12 – Karl Heinrich Barth, pianist and music teacher (d. 1922)
- July 21 – Víctor Mirecki Larramat, cellist and music teacher (d. 1921)
- October 21 – Giuseppe Giacosa, librettist for some of Puccini's operas (d. 1906)
- November 1 – Emma Albani, soprano (d. 1930)
- November 30 – August Klughardt, conductor and composer (d. 1902)
- December 1 – Agathe Backer Grøndahl, pianist and composer (d. 1907)
- December 9 – George Grossmith, comic writer and performer (d. 1912)
- December 18 – Augusta Holmès, composer (d. 1903)
- December 28 – James Frederick Swift, organist and composer (d. 1931)
- date unknown – Emma Fursch-Madi, operatic soprano (d. 1894)

== Deaths ==
- January 6 – Tyagaraja, Carnatic music composer (born 1767)
- April 23 – Erik Gustaf Geijer, writer and composer (born 1783)
- May 14 – Fanny Hensel, pianist and composer (born 1805; stroke)
- June 11 – Heinrich Bärmann, clarinet virtuoso (born 1784)
- June 18 – Lisette Stenberg, actress and musician (born 1770)
- July 19 – Johann Wilhelm Wilms, composer (born 1772)
- September 4 – František Vladislav Hek, writer and composer (born 1769)
- September 25 – Emma Albertazzi, English contralto (born 1814)
- November 4 – Felix Mendelssohn, pianist, conductor and composer (born 1809)
- November 20 – Henry Francis Lyte, hymnist (born 1793)
- date unknown – Francesco Molino, guitarist and composer (b. 1775)
