= 1805 in music =

This is a list of music-related events in 1805.

== Events ==
- April 7 – Beethoven's Symphony No. 3, Eroica, has its public premiere at the Theater an der Wien in Vienna under his baton, marking the beginning of his middle period.
- November 20 – Beethoven's only opera Fidelio in its original form (known retrospectively as Leonore) is premiered at the Theater an der Wien in Vienna.
- Louis Spohr is appointed musical director to the court of Gotha.
- Niccolò Paganini begins touring Europe.

== Classical music ==
- Ludwig van Beethoven
  - Leonora Overture No.2, Op. 72a
  - Erlkönig, WoO 131
- ETA Hoffmann – Piano Sonatas
- Franz Krommer – Concerto for Oboe in F Major, Op. 52
- Louis Spohr
  - 2 String Quartets, Op. 4
  - Violin Concerto No. 3, Op. 7
- Joseph Wölfl
  - Piano Sonata in C minor, Op. 25
  - Three Piano Sonatas, Op. 33

== Opera ==
- Michele Carafa – Il Fantasma
- Luigi Cherubini – Faniska
- James Hook – The Soldier's Return
- Ludwig van Beethoven – Fidelio

== Births ==
- January 7 – Philip Klitz, composer (d. 1854)
- February 22 – Robert Reinick, lyricist and artist (died 1852)
- March 5 – Théodore Labarre, harpist and composer (d. 1870)
- March 17 – Manuel García, singer and music teacher (d. 1906)
- May 14 – Johan Peter Emilius Hartmann, composer (d. 1900)
- July 8 – Luigi Ricci, opera composer (d. 1859)
- July 27 – Luigi Felice Rossi, composer and musicologist (d. 1863)
- October 28 – John Thomson, composer (d. 1841)
- November 1 – Alessandro Nini, composer (d. 1880)
- November 14 – Fanny Mendelssohn, pianist and composer (d. 1847)

== Deaths ==
- January 23 – Václav Pichl, composer (b. 1741)
- February 4 – Johann George Tromlitz, flautist (b. 1725)
- April – Emerico Lobo de Mesquita, organist, conductor, composer and music teacher (b. 1746)
- April 28 – Peter Pelham, harpsichordist, organist and composer (b. 1721)
- May 9 – Friedrich Schiller, librettist and poet (born 1759)
- May 10 – Johann Evangelist Haydn, tenor, brother of Joseph Haydn and Michael Haydn (b. 1743)
- May 28 – Luigi Boccherini, composer (b. 1743)
- August – Ann Griffiths, hymn-writer (b. 1776)
- November – Hamoir, dancer and theatre director
- December 18 – Gennaro Astarita, opera composer (b. c.1745)
