= Der Ring des Nibelungen: composition of the music =

The composition of the epic operatic tetralogy The Ring of the Nibelung occupied Richard Wagner for more than a quarter of a century. Conceived around 1848, the work was not finished until 1874, less than two years before the entire cycle was given its premiere at Bayreuth. Most of this time was devoted to the composition of the music, the text having been largely completed in about four years.

== Wagner's method of composition ==
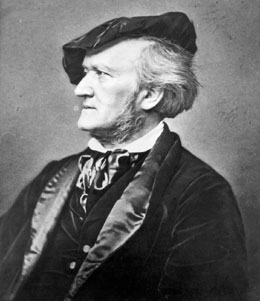
Richard Wagner

Like his libretti, Wagner's operatic scores generally passed through a series of distinct stages from sketch to fair copy; but because the composer altered his method of musical composition several times during the writing of the Ring, there is not the same uniformity in the evolution of the music that we find in the texts. Furthermore, it was often Wagner's practice to work on two or more drafts of a work at the same time, switching back and forth between them as the fancy took him. Consequently, it is all but impossible to make definitive statements about the exact order in which the various themes, leitmotifs and instrumentations were arrived at. Each score, however, did pass through at least three stages, there being seven possible stages in all: (Note: The English terms employed are those used by Warren Darcy in Burbidge & Sutton (1979, p.). The corresponding German terms, which are given in parentheses, are taken from the official catalog of Wagner's musical works and their textual sources, Verzeichnis der musikalischen Werke Richard Wagners und ihrer Quellen, which is commonly abbreviated to Wagner-Werk-Verzeichnis, or WWV. The English terms used in this article are not the only ones in common use; moreover, they are not always literal translations of the corresponding German terms.)

- Preliminary and supplementary sketches (Einzelskizzen) – before beginning the composition proper, Wagner usually made some preliminary sketches to work on. Needless to say, he added supplementary sketches to these throughout the compositional process. These sketches are sometimes little more than fragmentary phrases jotted down on scraps of paper; but they can also be quite lengthy and elaborate sections of music written on several staves. Sometimes they are labelled (e.g. "Fafner", "Waldvogel"). Unlike the preliminary sketches for his earlier operas, however, which were usually settings of lines of text, the sketches for the Ring operas were generally worked out independently of the text; vocal sketches do survive, but more often than not even these are without text. It is highly unlikely that all Wagner's sketches have come down to us, and of course not everything need have been sketched – some of the music for the preliminary drafts may have been composed from scratch as it was required – but the "cleaner" a passage in a draft is, the more likely it is that it was preceded by a sketch.
- Preliminary draft (Gesamtentwurf) – the first complete draft in pencil (later traced over in ink) of the entire work (in the case of the first two Ring operas) or of an entire act (in the case of the last two). There is generally only one vocal stave and one or two instrumental staves. Instrumental interludes are sometimes elaborated on three staves. The preliminary draft for Das Rheingold was similar in detail to the one Wagner composed for Lohengrin, but those of the following three Ring operas were as detailed as Lohengrin's second complete draft (the so-called "composition draft").
- Developed draft (Orchesterskizze) – in the case of Siegfried (acts 1 and 2), the preliminary drafts were elaborated before Wagner proceeded to develop the full scores. In these intermediate drafts, he worked out all the orchestral details, including instrumental doublings. The developed drafts for the first two acts of Siegfried are in ink and are written on one vocal and two instrumental staves throughout. In WWV these developed drafts are called Orchesterskizzen, a term which WWV also employs to describe the more elaborate second drafts of the later acts of the Ring.
- Orchestral draft (Orchesterskizze) – in the composition of the third act of Siegfried and all three acts of Götterdämmerung, the preliminary draft was followed by an elaborate short score written in ink on two or three vocal staves and as many as five instrumental staves. These Orchesterskizzen, as Wagner himself styled them, are even more detailed than the developed drafts of the first two acts of Siegfried.
- Instrumentation draft (Instrumentationsskizze) – in the case of the four scenes of Das Rheingold, the preliminary draft was followed by what Wagner termed an Instrumentationsskizze, in which he worked out most of the orchestral details. This draft was written in pencil and on as many staves as were required by the instrumentation. It is thus but one remove from being a full score, and in WWV both are referred to by the same name. The instrumental prelude that precedes scene 1 was not included in the instrumentation draft, however, but was written out in ink in full score without any intermediate stage, as is explained below.
- Full score (Partiturerstschrift) – the final score, in which the instrumentation is fully detailed and separate staves are allocated to the various instruments and singers. The full scores for Die Walküre and Siegfried (acts 1 and 2) are in pencil; those for Das Rheingold (prelude), Siegfried (act 3) and the whole of Götterdämmerung are in ink. Needless to say, as many staves are used as are required by the instrumentation. No full score was made for Das Rheingold (scenes 1–4), as the instrumentation draft was considered sufficiently detailed for a fair copy to be made directly from it.
- Fair copy (Reinschrift der Partitur) – a clean copy in ink of the full score. Wagner only drafted fair copies for Das Rheingold, Die Walküre and the first two acts of Siegfried. In the case of the Das Rheingold (scenes 1–4), there was no full score as such, so the fair copy was the only copy of the full score. In the case of Siegfried (act 3) and the whole of Götterdämmerung the full scores were written neatly in ink, so Wagner did not deem it necessary to draft a separate fair copy. (Note: Fair copies of these last two works do exist, but they were not drafted by Wagner.) The fair copy of Das Rheingold was, incidentally, the first fair copy Wagner ever made of one of his operas.

== Earliest sketches ==
It took Wagner just over four years to complete the text of his Ring cycle (1848–1852). The composition of the music, however, would occupy him, on and off, for almost a quarter of a century. In the summer of 1850 he actually began to compose music for the prologue of Siegfried's Tod (Siegfried's Death, as Götterdämmerung was originally called) before he had even conceived of the Ring cycle itself. This effort, however, was premature and Wagner abandoned the work near the beginning of the second scene, in which Siegfried takes his leave of Brünnhilde.

The following summer Wagner made another abortive attempt to compose music for his gradually emerging operatic cycle. Only a handful of sketches survive for Der junge Siegfried (The Young Siegfried, as Siegfried was originally called). Some of these were later drawn upon when Wagner came to compose Siegfried proper in 1856.

A few other sketches survive from these early years. On 23 July 1851 Wagner wrote down on a loose sheet of paper what was to become the best-known leitmotif in the entire cycle: the theme from the "Ride of the Valkyries" ("Walkürenritt"). Other early sketches for Die Walküre were made in the summer of 1852. There also exist three sets of isolated musical sketches for Das Rheingold which were composed between 15 September 1852 and November 1853. The first of these was entered into the verse draft of the text, the second into Wagner's copy of the 1853 printing of the text; the third was written on an undated sheet of music paper. All three were subsequently used by Wagner.

The idea for the prelude of Das Rheingold famously came to Wagner in a "vision" he had on 5 September 1853 as he lay in a semi-conscious state in an inn at La Spezia, Italy: (Note: The historicity of this event has been recently called into question. See, for example, The New Grove Wagner by John Deathridge and Carl Dahlhaus (W. W. Norton & Co., 1984).)

After a night spent in fever and sleeplessness, I forced myself to take a long tramp the next day through the hilly country, which was covered with pine woods. It all looked dreary and desolate, and I could not think what I should do there. Returning in the afternoon, I stretched myself, dead tired, on a hard couch, awaiting the long-desired hour of sleep. It did not come; but I fell into a kind of somnolent state, in which I suddenly felt as though I were sinking in swiftly flowing water. The rushing sound formed itself in my brain into a musical sound, the chord of E-flat major, which continually re-echoed in broken forms; these broken chords seemed to be melodic passages of increasing motion, yet the pure triad of E-flat major never changed, but seemed by its continuance to impart infinite significance to the element in which I was sinking. I awoke in sudden terror from my doze, feeling as though the waves were rushing high above my head. I at once recognised that the orchestral overture to the Rheingold, which must long have lain latent within me, though it had been unable to find definite form, had at last been revealed to me.

However, it was not until 1 November 1853, at his lodgings in Zurich, that he finally sat down and began the first continuous musical draft of the tetralogy. Five and a half years had passed since he had completed his last opera, Lohengrin.

== Das Rheingold ==
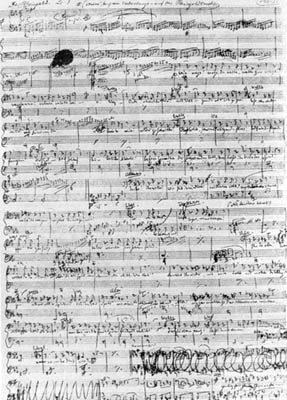
A page from Wagner's autograph score of Das Rheingold

The composition of Das Rheingold occupied Wagner from 1 November 1853 to 26 September 1854. He began by developing a preliminary draft (Gesamtentwurf) of the entire work from his sketches. This 77-page draft, which was written in pencil and on two (sometimes three) staves, was completed by 14 January 1854. The following month (1 February) he proceeded to make a second complete draft. It seems that his first intention was to make a composition draft in ink, just as he had done for Lohengrin, but as such a draft of the prelude – which consists of little more than an arpeggiated E♭ major triad – would have been to all intents and purposes a full score, he decided to skip the intermediate stage and draft the full score in ink right away. This he proceeded to do with the prelude, significantly revising some of its details in the process. (Note: Perhaps the most significant revision was the addition of the famous leitmotif known as "Nature" (Natur), which is played as a canon by eight horns throughout the prelude. Curiously, this famous theme is not present in the preliminary draft. It was only after Wagner had composed two other similar leitmotifs – "Erda" and the "Rainbow Bridge" – that the idea for Nature came to him. Nature is in fact a conflation of the other two motifs, combining the rhythm and rising melodic line of Erda with the principal tones of the Rainbow Bridge.) When, however, he reached the beginning of scene 1, he found that the remainder of the opera required too much revision and elaboration to allow him to develop a full score without first making a second complete draft. He therefore abandoned the full score in ink and proceeded to develop instead an instrumentation draft in pencil, in which he worked out most of the vocal and orchestral details of the four remaining scenes. This Instrumentationsskizze, as Wagner himself styled it, was completed by 28 May 1854.

Two things should be noted about the second complete draft of Das Rheingold. Firstly, the full score of the prelude (in ink) and the instrumentation draft of the remainder of the opera (in pencil) together constitute a single manuscript (WWV 86A Musik III). In WWV this is called a Partiturerstschrift, a term usually reserved for Wagner's full scores: strictly speaking only the section in ink is a Partiturerstschrift. Secondly, the manuscript is fragmentary: thirty-three measures are missing, which include the closing measures of the prelude and the opening measures of scene 1. As ink is used before this lacuna and pencil after it, it is generally assumed that Wagner switched from one medium to the other at the entrance of the voices (i.e. the first measure of scene 1); but until and unless the missing sheets are recovered, this must remain an assumption.

The final stage of the compositional process was the writing out in ink of a fair copy of the full score (Reinschrift der Partitur). This task was begun by Wagner himself on 15 February 1854, while he was still at work on the instrumentation draft. It was delayed, however, by his decision to start work on Die Walküre (28 June 1854). Sometime in the summer of 1854 he hired a copyist to make a fair copy in ink of Das Rheingold (using his own unfinished fair copy as a model), but the copyist's work was so full of blunders that Wagner was forced to dismiss him and resume work on his own copy. He worked at it on and off for several months, alternating this work with the ongoing composition of Die Walküre. By 25 September 1854 the fair copy of Das Rheingold was finally completed. Wagner then sent it to the Dresden copyist Friedrich Wölfel, who completed a beautiful and very accurate ink copy on 11 November 1855. Wöfel's copy was used as the source-text (Stichvorlage) for the first public printing of the complete opera in 1873. (Note: Das Rheingold was first published in 1873 in Mainz by B. Schott's Söhne.)

Wagner gave his own fair copy to his patron Ludwig II of Bavaria as a birthday gift on 25 August 1865, and it eventually found its way into the king's family archives. More than half a century later it was purchased by the German Chamber of Industry and Commerce and presented to Adolf Hitler on the occasion of the Führer's fiftieth birthday (20 April 1939). During the latter stages of the war Hitler kept it with him in his bunker at Berlin. It was destroyed (along with the autograph scores of Die Feen, Das Liebesverbot and Rienzi, and the fair copy of Die Walküre) shortly before the fall of Berlin in May 1945 (though a number of conspiracy theories continue to claim otherwise).

== Die Walküre ==
As has been seen, Wagner sketched out the theme for the Ride of the Valkyries on 23 July 1851; other than this, the earliest musical sketches for Die Walküre date from the summer of 1852. But it was not until 28 June 1854 that Wagner began to transform these into a complete draft of all three acts of the opera. This preliminary draft (Gesamtentwurf), which was completed by 27 December 1854, was written in pencil and shows a greater degree of orchestral elaboration than the corresponding draft of Das Rheingold.

In January 1855 Wagner proceeded to compose the full score without bothering to write an intermediate instrumentation draft as he had done for Das Rheingold. This was a decision he was soon to regret, as numerous interruptions (Note: Among the distractions was a four-month visit to London, during which Wagner conducted eight concerts of the Philharmonic Society. He also revised his Faust Overture and supervised a production of Tannhäuser in the same year.) made the task of orchestrating the Gesamtentwurf an exceedingly difficult one. If he allowed too much time to elapse between the initial drafting of a passage and its later elaboration, he found that he could not remember how he had intended to orchestrate the draft. Consequently, some passages had to be composed again from scratch. Wagner, nevertheless, persevered with the task and the full score was finally completed on 20 March 1856. The fair copy was begun on 14 July 1855 in the Swiss resort of Seelisberg, where Wagner and his wife spent a month. It was completed in Zurich on 23 March 1856, just three days after the completion of the full score.

== Siegfried, acts 1 and 2 ==
In September or October 1854 the German poet and political activist Georg Herwegh introduced Wagner to the philosophy of Arthur Schopenhauer. Schopenhauer's pessimistic and renunciatory philosophy had a profound effect on Wagner, and it was only to be expected that it should influence the composition of the Ring. (Note: "On looking afresh into my Nibelungen poem I recognised with surprise that the very things that now so embarrassed me theoretically had long been familiar to me in my own poetical conception. Now at last I could understand my Wotan, and I returned with chastened mind to the renewed study of Schopenhauer's book.") In 1856 the libretto of Siegfried was revised and a new ending was devised for Götterdämmerung – the so-called Schopenhauer ending.

When Wagner came to compose Siegfried, he made three significant alterations to his modus operandi. Firstly, he wrote (in ink and on at least three staves) a developed draft between the preliminary draft and the full score; this intermediate draft included most of the orchestral details of the final score; this procedure, Wagner hoped, would facilitate the writing of the full score, obviating the difficulties he had encountered during the composition of Die Walküre. Secondly, he composed one act at a time, carrying the composition of the music through all three stages from preliminary draft to full score (but not necessarily fair copy) for the first act before proceeding to the composition of the second act; this way he ensured that as little time as possible elapsed between the initial drafting of a passage and its final orchestration. Thirdly, he frequently worked on the various drafts at the same time, orchestrating the earlier scenes of an act while still drafting the later ones.

Discounting the earlier sketches he had made for Der junge Siegfried (summer 1851), the composition of Siegfried was begun in Zurich in September 1856. The developed draft was begun on 22 September, almost immediately after the (undated) preliminary draft. The full score was begun on 11 October, so Wagner was working on all three stages at the same time. On 19 December, however, he began to sketch some themes for Tristan und Isolde; from this point on there were to be many interruptions in the composition of Siegfried. Nevertheless, by 31 March 1857 the full score of act 1 was finished. Sometime thereafter Wagner began to make a fair copy, but he abandoned this task after just one scene.

Almost two months elapsed before he began work on act 2; the prelude, "Fafners Ruhe" ("Fafner's Rest") was sketched on 20 May 1857, while the preliminary draft was begun on 22 May, the composer's forty-fourth birthday. On 18 June, he began the developed draft while still working on the preliminary draft; but later that same month he dropped the work (at the point where Siegfried rests himself beneath the linden tree) to concentrate on Tristan und Isolde. The preliminary draft reached this point on the 26th, and the developed draft on the 27th. It seems that Wagner was tiring of the Ring and he considered putting it aside for a while:

I have determined finally to give up my headstrong design of completing the Nibelungen. I have led my young Siegfried to a beautiful forest solitude, and there have left him under a linden tree, and taken leave of him with heartfelt tears.

This hiatus, however, did not last as long as Wagner had anticipated. On 13 July 1857 he took up the work again and finished act 2 within four weeks, the preliminary draft being completed on 30 July and the developed draft on 9 August. The full score of the first act was now complete (in pencil), and a fair copy had been made (in ink) of the opening scene; the developed draft of the second act was finished, but the full score had not yet been begun. At this point Wagner once again put the opera aside to concentrate on Tristan und Isolde. Seven years would pass before he took it up again, during which time he completed Tristan and started Die Meistersinger von Nürnberg.

== Wagner's wanderings ==
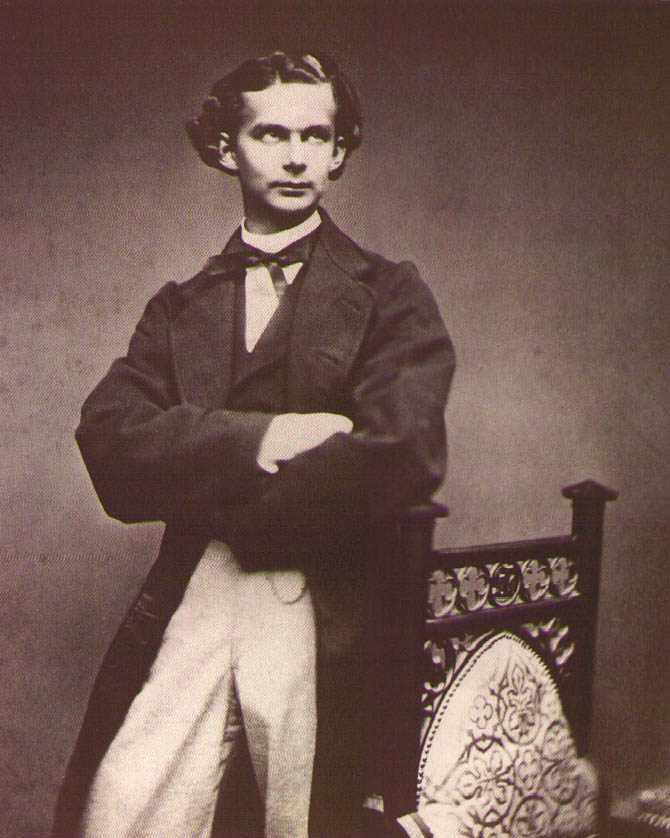
Wagner's generous patron Ludwig II of Bavaria (age 19, 1864, shortly after his accession).

When Wagner began the composition of the Ring in November 1853, he was living with his first wife Minna Planer at 13 Zeltweg, Zurich, and it was there that Das Rheingold, Die Walküre, and the first act of Siegfried were for the most part composed. At this time Wagner's limited means compelled him to accept financial assistance from a wealthy silk merchant, Otto Wesendonck. On 28 April 1857, Wagner and Minna moved into the Asyl, a small cottage on Wesendonck's new estate near Zurich, which the generous patron had placed at Wagner's disposal. It was there that Wagner resumed work on Siegfried in May 1857.

In August 1858, however, Wagner was forced to leave Zurich alone, following an argument with Minna over his questionable relationship with Wesendonck's wife Mathilde; he and Minna were formally separated in 1862, though Wagner continued to support her financially until her death in 1866. From 1858 to 1864 Wagner spent six restless years wandering across Europe. During this period he lived in several different cities – Venice, Lucerne, Paris, Vienna, Weimar, Karlsruhe, Zurich, Munich, Nürnberg, Leipzig, Dresden, Biebrich near Wiesbaden, and Stuttgart among them – and all this time Siegfried languished unfinished.

In 1864, Wagner finally settled in Munich at the behest of his enthusiastic new patron Ludwig II of Bavaria, who had just acceded to the throne at the age of 19, and it was there in September that he took up Siegfried once again; more than seven years had elapsed since he had last worked on it. He resumed the task of making a fair copy of act 1, finishing scene 2; then, between 22 December 1864 and 2 December 1865, he wrote out the full score of act 2. But that same month he was forced to leave Bavaria, having scandalized Ludwig's court by conducting an adulterous affair with Liszt's married daughter Cosima. On 30 March 1866, Wagner moved into a villa in Tribschen, on the shores of Lake Lucerne in Switzerland; Cosima joined him there two months later. Tribschen was to be Richard and Cosima's home for the next six years. They were eventually married on 25 August 1870.

== Siegfried, act 3 ==
With Wagner's exile from Bavaria in December 1865, a third hiatus ensued in the composition of Siegfried, during which Wagner completed Die Meistersinger. Work on Siegfried was resumed at the start of 1869 and on 23 February the fair copies of acts 1 and 2 were finally completed. A week later, on 1 March, Wagner began the composition of act 3. Working from sketches dating from around 1864 and thereafter, he proceeded to make a preliminary draft of the entire act, as was his usual practice. This was completed fifteen weeks later on 14 June. The second complete draft – the orchestral draft (see above) – was finished on 5 August. The full score was begun on 25 August and completed on 5 February 1871. As explained above, Wagner never made a fair copy of the third act of Siegfried.

It is often said that twelve years elapsed between the second and third acts of Siegfried, but this is an exaggeration. While it is true that eleven years and twenty-nine weeks passed between the completion of the developed draft of act 2 and the beginning of the preliminary draft of act 3, Wagner devoted more than a year of this so-called hiatus to the composition of Siegfried, completing the fair copy of act 1, drawing up both the full score and fair copy of act 2, and making sketches for act 3.

== Götterdämmerung ==
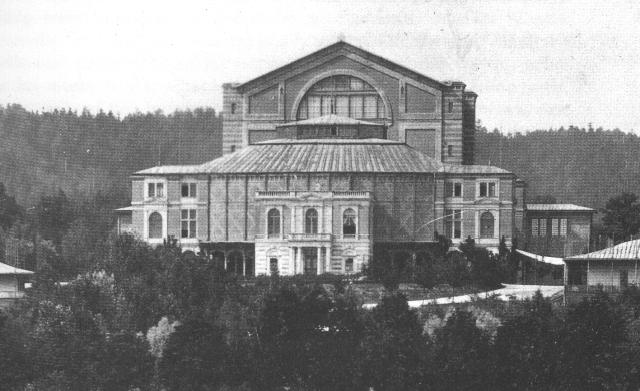
Bayreuth Festspielhaus, in which the Ring was premiered in 1876

Impatient to complete his epic cycle, Wagner began work on the preliminary draft of Götterdämmerung on 2 October 1869, while he was still at work on the third act of Siegfried. There was to be no fair copy of this the final opera in the cycle, so the three acts passed through just three stages: preliminary draft (Gesamtentwurf), orchestral draft (Orchesterskizze), and full score (Partiturerstschrift). Wagner had altered his modus operandi once again while at work on the last two acts of Die Meistersinger: now it was his practice to finish both complete drafts of each act in turn before beginning the full score of the entire opera.

The composition of Götterdämmerung proceeded without much difficulty, as Wagner was now thoroughly familiar with his musical material and his enlarged orchestra. There was a brief interruption over Christmas, but the work was resumed early in the new year (on 9 January 1870). The second complete draft – the orchestral draft – was begun just two days later and Wagner worked on both drafts together. It was not until 5 February 1871 that the completion of Siegfried allowed him the time to concentrate on Götterdämmerung.

By the summer of 1871 both drafts of the prologue and act 1 were finished and Wagner had begun the preliminary draft of act 2. The orchestral draft was not begun, however, until 18 November of the same year. Act 2 was completed by the end of the year.

Sometime in 1871 or 1872 Wagner made a verse draft of the so-called Schopenhauer ending for act 3 of Götterdämmerung, though it was not destined to be used. This was not the only change he made to the text of act 3. While setting this act to music, he decided that Gutrune should die (in earlier drafts she merely fainted). During rehearsals for the world premiere at Bayreuth in 1876 Wagner even pointed out to his assistant Heinrich Porges the exact measure in which she expires.

Work on the preliminary draft of act 3 began on 4 January 1872, followed shortly thereafter by the orchestral draft. The former was finished on 9 April and the latter on 22 July. In April of that year, the Wagners left Tribschen and settled in Bayreuth where the Bayreuth Festspielhaus was to be constructed for the premiere of the Ring. A year later, on 28 April 1873, they moved into Wahnfried, Wagner's new mansion in Bayreuth.

On 3 May 1873, just five days after taking up residence in Wahnfried, Wagner began the full score of Götterdämmerung. On Christmas Eve he had reached the end of act 1. On 26 June 1874 the second act was fully scored, and less than five months later, on 21 November 1874, the full score of the entire opera was ready. On the very last page Wagner wrote: Vollendet in Wahnfried am 21. November 1874. Ich sage nichts weiter!! RW (Completed in Wahnfried on 21 November 1874. I will say no more!! RW)

After more than a quarter of a century, Der Ring des Nibelungen was finally completed.

== See also ==
- Der Ring des Nibelungen: composition of the text

== Notes and references ==
=== Sources ===
- Burbidge, Peter; Sutton, Richard, eds. (1979). The Wagner Companion. New York: Cambridge University Press. ISBN 0-521-227879 – via Internet Archive.
- Jacobs, Robert L. (1983). Rehearsing the Ring (English translation of Porges 1881). New York: Cambridge. ISBN 0-521-23722-X.
- Porges, Heinrich (1881). Die Bühnenproben zu den Bayreuther Festspielen des Jahres 1876. Chemnitz, E. S. Schmeitzner.
- Wagner, Richard; Liszt, Franz (1889). Correspondence of Wagner and Liszt. Vol. 2. Translated by Francis Hueffer. New York: Scribner and Welford – via Internet Archive.
- Wagner, Richard (1936) [1911]. My Life. Vol. I–II. Translated by Andrew L. Gray; Mary Whittall. New York: Tudor Publishing – via Internet Archive.
