= Give Me My Arrows and Give Me My Bow =

"Give Me My Arrows And Give Me My Bow"
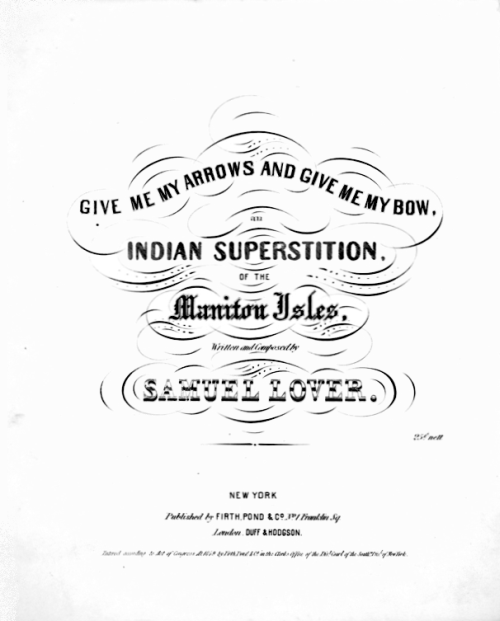
- Sheet music cover, 1848

Song
- Published: 1848
- Songwriter(s): Samuel Lover

"Give Me My Arrows And Give Me My Bow" is a ballad written and composed by Samuel Lover in 1848. Lovers, an Irish songwriter and novelist, wrote the ballad during a trip to the United States.

== Preface ==
Lover prefaced the poem with an introductory story:

In the Great North American lakes there are islands bearing the name of "Manitou," which signifies "THE GREAT SPIRIT," and Indian tradition declares that in these islands the Great Spirit concealed the precious metals, thereby showing that he did not desire they should be possessed by man; and that whenever some rash mortal has attempted to obtain treasure from "The Manitou Isle," his canoe was always overwhelmed by a tempest. The " Palefaces," however, fearless of " Manitou's" thunder, are now working the extensive mineral region of the lakes.

== Poem/Ballad ==
Tempt me not, stranger, with gold from the mine,
I have got treasure more precious than thine;
Freedom in forest, and health in the chase,
Where the hunter sees beauty in Nature's bright face,
Then give me my arrows and give me my bow,
In the wild woods to rove where the blue rapids flow.

If gold had been good THE GREAT SPIRIT had giv'n
That gift, like his others, as freely from Heav'n:—
The lake gives me Whitefish; — the deer gives me meat,
And the toil of the capture gives slumber so sweet:—
Then give me my arrows and give me my bow.
In the wild woods to rove where the blue rapids flow.

Why seek you death in the dark cave to find
While there's life on the hill in the health-breathing wind?
And death parts you soon from your treasure so bright—
As the gold of the sunset is lost in the night:—
Then give me my arrows and give me my how,
In the wild woods to rove where the blue rapids flow.

== Title ==
The song title came from the first line of "The Samoyeds", a poem by Rev. Isaac Taylor.

== Bibliography ==
- —. "Our Portrait Gallery.—No. LXII: Samuel Lover". pp. 196–206, The Dublin University Magazine: Literary and Political Journal. No. CCXVII (February 1851) Vol XXXVI. Dublin: James McGlashan.
- Lover, Samuel. Songs and Ballads. London: David Bryce (1858).
- Lover, Samuel. "Give Me My Arrows And Give Me My Bow" (Sheet music). New York: Firth, Pond & Co. (1848).
- Taylor, Isaac, Rev. Scenes in Asia: for the Amusement and Instruction of Little Tarry-at-Home Travellers. London: St. Paul's Church-Yard (1826).
