= 1880 in Norwegian music =

The following is a list of notable events and releases of the year 1880 in Norwegian music.

== Events ==
- September – Edvard Grieg becomes artistic director of the Bergen Philharmonic Orchestra.

== New works ==
- Edvard Grieg – 2 Elegiac Melodies, Op.34

== Deaths ==
August

- 17 – Ole Bull, virtuoso violinist and composer (born 1810)

October

- 8 – Magnus Brostrup Landstad, parish priest and provost, psalmist and poet (born 1802).

== Births ==
April

- 29 – Sigvart Høgh-Nilsen, pianist and composer (died 1919)

== See also ==
- 1880 in Norway
- Music of Norway
