= 1854 in philosophy =

1854 in philosophy

== Events ==
- Søren Kierkegaard launches his attack on Christendom represented by the Church of Denmark with a series of newspaper pamphlets and polemics today collected under the title The Moment.

== Publications ==
- George Boole, The Laws of Thought (1854)
- Henry David Thoreau, Walden (1854)

== Births ==
- January 1 - James George Frazer (died 1941)
- April 29 - Henri Poincaré (died 1912)

== Deaths ==
- August 20 - Friedrich Wilhelm Joseph Schelling (born 1775)
