= Ballade No. 1 (Liszt) =

Composition for piano by Franz Liszt

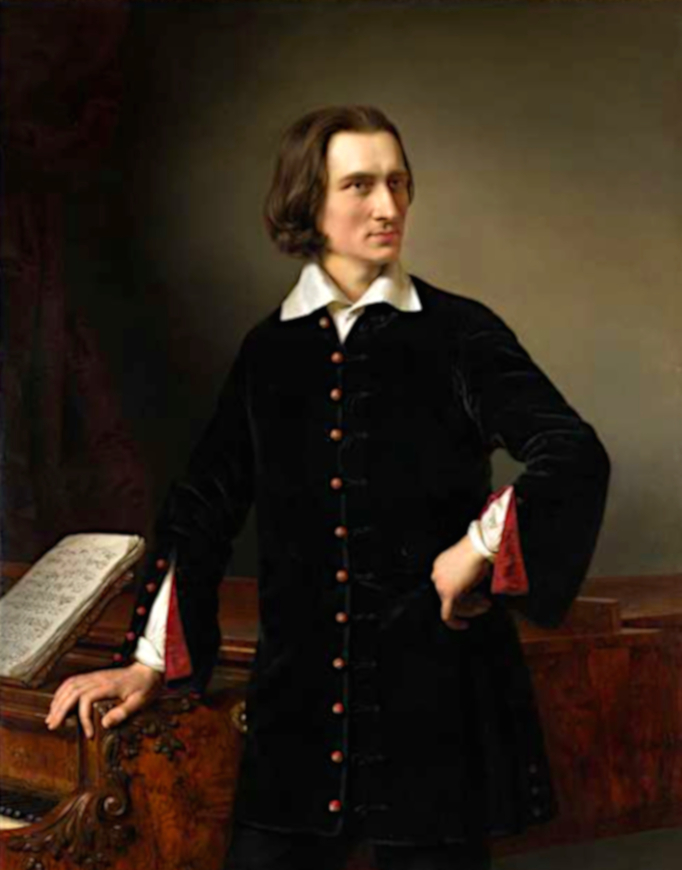
Franz Liszt, portrait by Hungarian painter Miklós Barabás, 1847

Ballade No. 1 in D♭ major, S.170, is a solo piano piece by the Hungarian composer Franz Liszt, composed between 1845 and 1848. In the original edition it contained the title "Le Chant Du Croisé" or "The Chant of the Crusader". A typical performance of the piece lasts about 7 to 8 minutes.

== Form and Structure ==
The piece contains two themes with a short introductory passage. The main theme is reiterated 7 times with different technical obstructions each time; the march-like second theme (marked Tempo di Marcia) is placed after the fifth iteration. It repeats itself only twice before returning into the main theme, though it returns with a modest coda at the close of the piece.
