= Eudice Shapiro =

American violinist (1914–2007)

Eudice Shapiro (1914–2007) was a violinist, chamber musician and violin professor.

Shapiro was born in Buffalo, New York, in 1914.

== Education ==
Shapiro began studying violin with her father when she was 5, won her first prize when she was 10 and began her solo career with the Buffalo Philharmonic when she was 12. She studied with Gustave Tinlot at the Eastman School of Music in Rochester, New York, and with Efrem Zimbalist at the Curtis Institute of Music in Philadelphia.

== Music career ==
She moved to Los Angeles in 1941 to begin playing in Hollywood studios for Paramount, United Artists and RKO. She was the first female concertmaster in any studio orchestra, beginning at RKO and Paramount.

== Career as educator ==
Shapiro was on the University of Southern California faculty starting in 1956. During the 1970s, she was the Dorothy Richard Starling Professor of Violin at the Shepherd School of Music of Rice University.

== Later life ==
She died Sept. 17, 2007.
