= James Frederick Swift =

English organist and composer

James Frederick Swift (28 December 1847, Manchester – 9 January 1931, Wallasey (Note: His place of death is sometimes stated as Liscard, Cheshire; currently Merseyside, which also contains Wallasey.)) was an English organist and composer. He mostly worked for religious establishments such as St Andrew's Church in Liverpool for 10 years, but he also composed around 200 non-religious songs and ballads under the pseudonym, Godfrey Marks. One of his most famous songs is Sailing, Sailing. It is a possibility that Swift composed this work on seamanship based on his inspiration from Nancy Lee by Michael Maybrick, despite that his daughter, Ruby Gertrude Swift, expressed that his father had never been close to seafaring activities. One of his famous religious songs includes Ernstein.
