= Romance S.169 =

Romance S.169, the theme of which is based on the song "O pourquoi donc" ("Why, oh Why"), is a piece of music written in 1848 by the Hungarian composer Franz Liszt during a visit to Moscow. It bears some resemblance to Chopin's Nocturne in E minor, as both pieces commence with broken E-minor chords.

Liszt, Romance S.169
Performed by Constantin Stephan

The piece would eventually be a predecessor for the Romance oubliée S.527 ("Forgotten Romance"), which was published more than 30 years after Romance S.169 was written. Friedrich Schnapp described the Romance S.169 as a "piece of music written in his youthful years", whereas the Romance oubliée can be seen as a slightly impressionistic old man's reminiscence.

Liszt, Romance oubliée S.527
Performed by Constantin Stephan
