= Der Ring des Nibelungen: composition of the text =

Account of the writing of Wagner operas

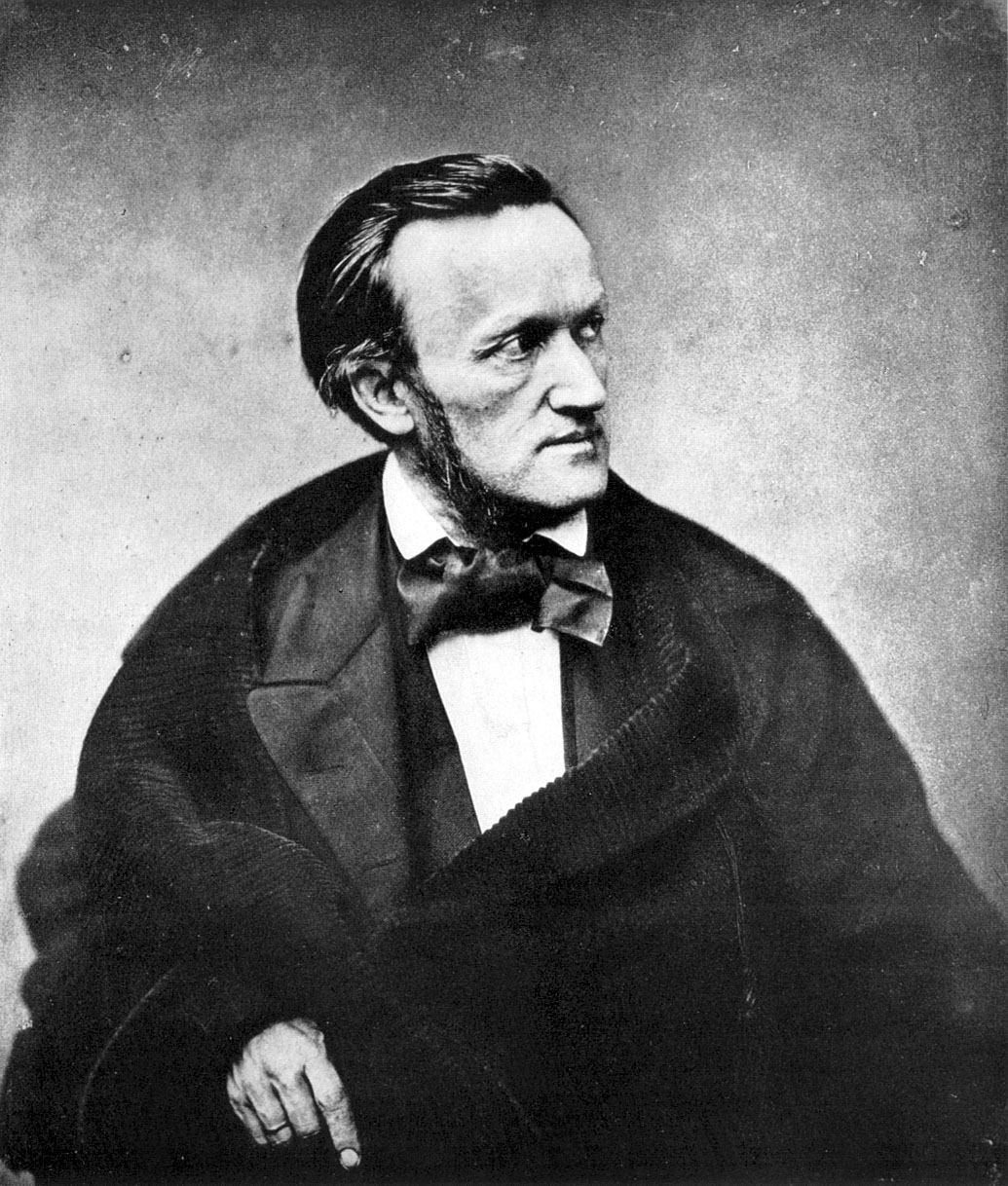
Richard Wagner (1861)

The evolution of Richard Wagner's epic operatic tetralogy Der Ring des Nibelungen (The Ring of the Nibelung) was a long and tortuous process, and the precise sequence of events which led the composer to embark upon such a vast undertaking is still unclear. The composition of the text took place between 1848 and 1853, when all four libretti were privately printed. The closing scene of the final opera, Götterdämmerung, was revised a number of times between 1856 and 1872. The names of the last two Ring operas, Siegfried and Götterdämmerung, were probably not definitively settled until 1856.

== Conception of the Ring ==
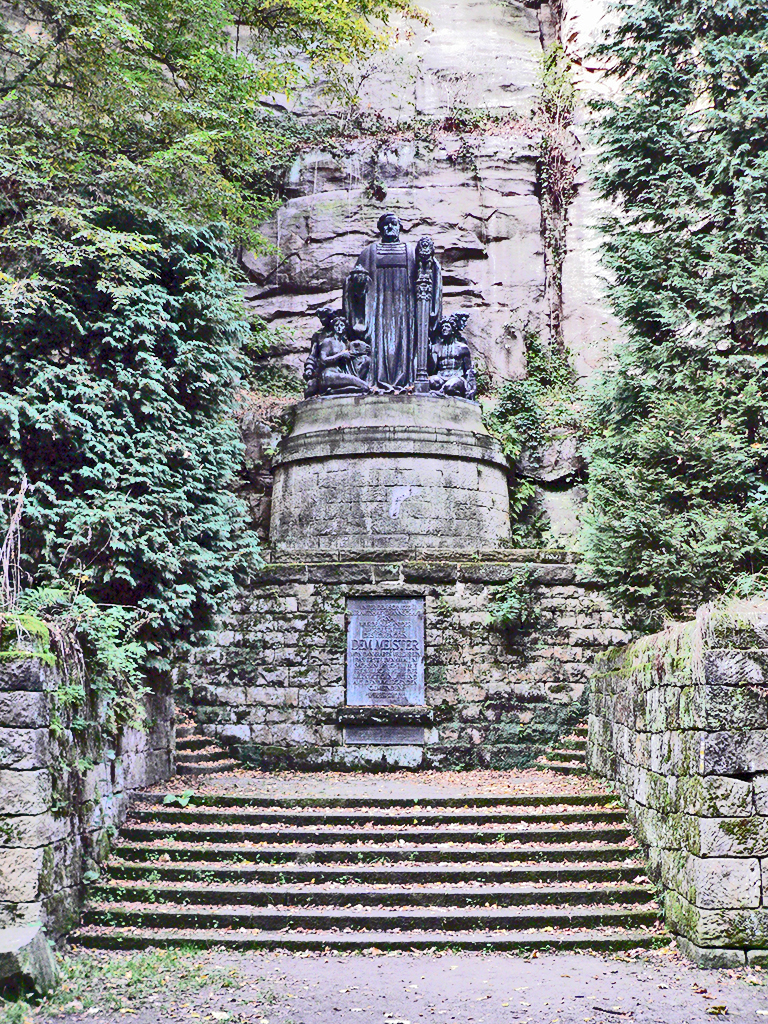
The Wagner memorial in the Liebethaler Grund near Dresden. Wagner probably conceived Siegfried's Tod during long walks in this picturesque valley.

According to the composer's own account – as related in his autobiography Mein Leben – it was after the February Revolution that he began to sketch a play on the life of the Hohenstaufen Holy Roman Emperor Friedrich Barbarossa. While researching this work, he came to see Friedrich as "a historical rebirth of the old, pagan Siegfried". Then, in the summer of 1848, he wrote the essay Die Wibelungen: Weltgeschichte aus der Saga (The Wibelungs: World History as Told in Saga), in which he noted some historical links (spurious, as it happens) between the Hohenstaufens and the legendary Nibelungs. This led him to consider Siegfried as a possible subject for a new opera, and by October 1848 the entire Ring cycle had been conceived.

This rather straightforward account of the Ring's origins, however, has been disputed by a number of authorities, who accuse Wagner of deliberately distorting the facts so as to bring them into harmony with his own private version of history. The actual sequence of events, it seems, was not nearly as clear-cut. It was in October 1846 – some sixteen months before the February Revolution – that he first drew up a plan for a five-act drama based on the life of Friedrich Barbarossa. He may even have considered writing an opera on Siegfried as early as 1843, when he read Jacob Grimm's Deutsche Mythologie (German Mythology), or possibly in 1844, when he borrowed several works on the Nibelungs from the Royal Library in Dresden. As for Die Wibelungen, it would appear that he only started work on this essay in December 1848 at the earliest, finishing it sometime before 22 February 1849, when he read it to his friend Eduard Devrient.

Whatever the truth, Wagner was certainly contemplating an opera on Siegfried by 1 April 1848, when he informed Devrient of his plans.

Wagner was probably encouraged in these endeavours by a number of German intellectuals who believed that contemporary artists should seek inspiration in the pages of the Nibelungenlied, a 12th-century epic poem in Middle High German which, since its rediscovery in 1755, had been hailed by the German Romantics as their country's "national epic". In 1844 the philosopher Friedrich Theodor Vischer suggested that the Nibelungenlied would make a suitable subject for German opera; and in 1845 and 1846 Louise Otto-Peters and Franz Brendel penned a series of articles in the Neue Zeitschrift für Musik inviting composers to write a "national opera" based on the epic. Otto-Peters even wrote a libretto for such an opera.

Wagner, as it happened, was already familiar with the Nibelungenlied. He had even drawn upon it for one of the scenes in an earlier opera, Lohengrin, the text of which was written between July and November 1845. Act II, Scene 4, in which Ortrud interrupts the procession to the minster and confronts Elsa, is based on Chapter 14 of the Nibelungenlied, "How the Queens Railed at Each Other"; in the corresponding scene of Götterdämmerung (also Act II, Scene 4), it is Brünnhilde who interrupts a stately procession and provokes a quarrel.

== Wagner the writer ==
Wagner's libretti, which he invariably wrote himself, usually passed through four stages; with one or two minor qualifications, the libretti of the four Ring operas were no different. These stages are as follows:

- Prose Sketch (Prosaskizze) – a brief outline of the dramatic action. Typically these sketches consisted of no more than a few paragraphs of prose, though Wagner sometimes added to them or modified them before proceeding to the next stage. This was the case with the sketches for the first three parts of the tetralogy. Exceptionally, however, Wagner (for reasons which will be explained later) never drafted a prose sketch for Götterdämmerung (or Siegfried's Tod, as it was originally called). The prose sketch for Act III of Die Walküre has disappeared.
- Prose Draft (Prosaentwurf) – an elaborate prose treatment of the opera, describing the action in great detail. These drafts were usually ten or more pages in length. They included a considerable amount of dialogue. Prose drafts survive for all four Ring operas.
- Verse Draft (Erstschrift des Textbuches) – a first draft of the final libretto, written in an archaic form of German alliterative verse known as Stabreim. Wagner created his verse drafts by versifying the dialogue already contained in his prose drafts – turning prose into poetry – or by creating new verse to replace those sections of the prose drafts for which he had not yet sketched any dialogue. He also added new elements not present in the prose drafts. For instance, the symbolic use of Wotan's spear and its engraved runes to embody the rule of law is not present in the prose draft of Das Rheingold: this idea only came to Wagner while he was working on the verse draft of Die Walküre. It was also while developing the latter that he first thought of making Loge a god of fire: in the prose draft of Das Rheingold he is merely a trickster and teller of unwelcome truths. While writing his verse drafts, Wagner also greatly expanded his stage directions (which, of course, were always in prose).
- Fair Copy (Reinschrift des Textbuches) – a clean, carefully written verse libretto (or Dichtung, "poem", as Wagner liked to call his finished libretti), usually free of corrections and alterations. Punctuation and capitalization were regularized at this stage. The fair copies generally incorporated the final version of any passage of the corresponding verse draft for which Wagner had sketched two or more competing versions; in a few cases the fair copy has an entirely new variant. The fair copies, however, were not necessarily the final versions of the libretti, as Wagner frequently made slight – but sometimes telling – alterations to the text during the composition of the music. Furthermore, he sometimes made two, three, or even four fair copies, incorporating revisions as he did so, in which case the fair copies are called respectively Zweitschrift (des Textbuches), Drittschrift, Viertschrift, and Fünftschrift.

== Siegfried's Tod ==
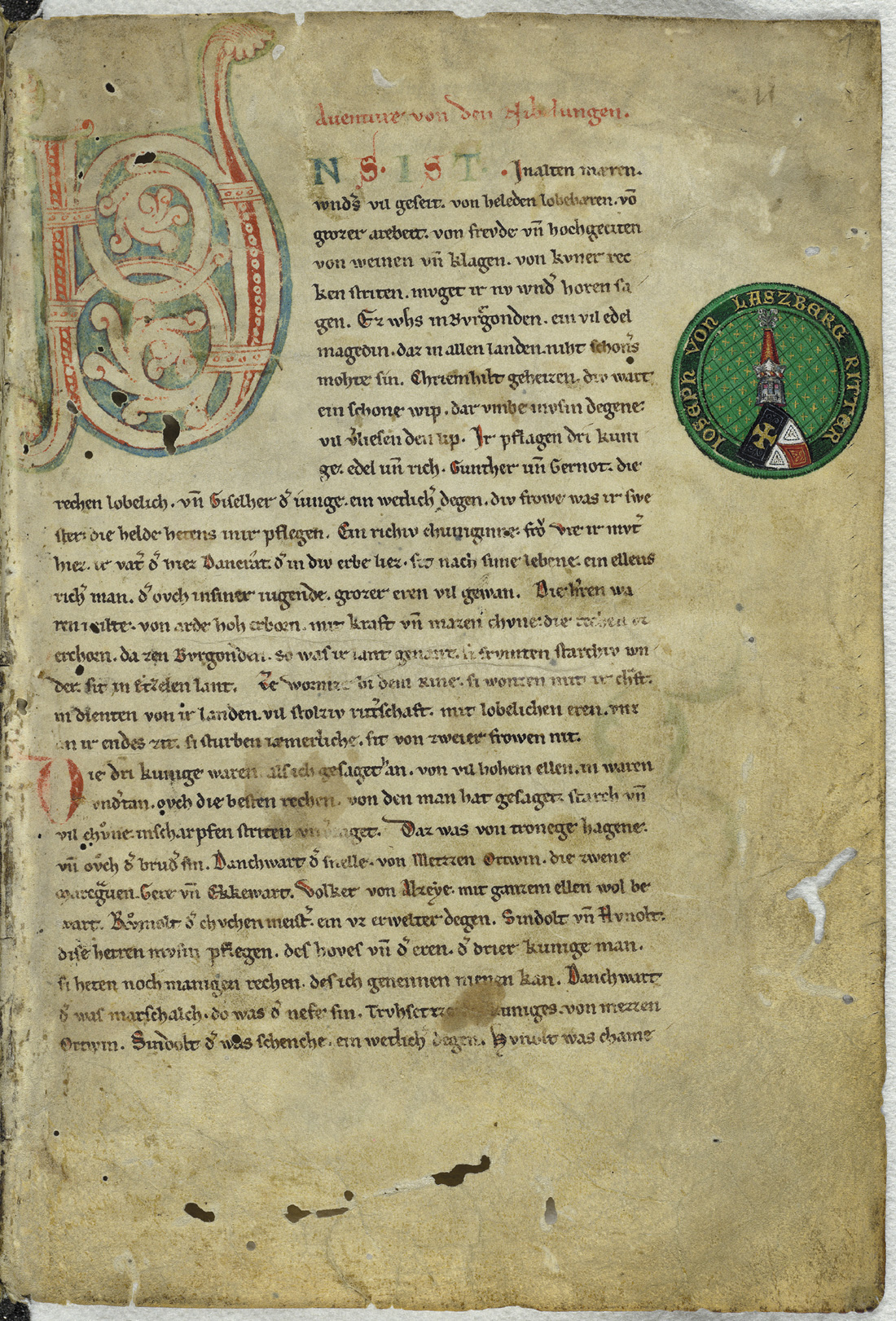
The opening page of the Nibelungenlied

As part of his preparations for the projected opera on Siegfried, Wagner first drafted a preliminary study of the relevant German and Nordic myths, Die Nibelungensage (Mythus) (The Nibelung Saga (Myth)). This lengthy prose scenario, which was completed by 4 October 1848, contains an outline of the entire Ring cycle from start to finish, though there is no evidence that Wagner was contemplating anything more at this point than a single opera on the death of Siegfried. When he made a fair copy of this text on 8 October, he renamed it Die Sage von den Nibelungen (The Saga of the Nibelungs). In the collected edition of his works (Gesammelte Schriften und Dichtungen) it is entitled Der Nibelungen-Mythus: als Entwurf zu einem Drama (The Nibelung Myth: as Sketch for a Drama).

In drafting this prose scenario, Wagner drew upon numerous works of German and Scandinavian mythology, both primary texts (usually in contemporary German translations, though Wagner had some knowledge of Old Norse and Middle German) and commentaries on them. The most important of the former were the Völsunga Saga, the Poetic Edda, the Prose Edda, the Nibelungenlied and Thidriks saga af Bern, while the most important of the latter were Jacob Grimm's German Mythology and Wilhelm Grimm's The German Hero-Saga. In addition to these, however, Wagner picked up various details from at least twenty-two other sources, including a number of key philosophical texts that informed the symbolism of the Ring. Wagner contradicts his sources on various points – necessarily so as the sources don’t always agree with one another – conflates disparate stories into continuous narratives, creates some new, memorable characters by combining minor characters from different sources, etc. The final scenario is as much a unique recreation of the original myths as the Nibelungenlied was in its day.

Because Die Sage von den Nibelungen already contained a detailed account of the dramatic action of the proposed opera, Wagner neglected to make any prose sketches according to his usual practice. Instead, he immediately wrote a prose draft of the new work, which was to be called Siegfried's Tod (Siegfried's Death), complete with "English" apostrophe. This apostrophe, incidentally, appears in all the textual manuscripts of the work and in the private imprint of 1853, but was dropped from the title in the Gesammelte Schriften und Dichtungen of 1871–1873.

On 28 October 1848, Wagner read the prose draft of Siegfried's Tod to Eduard Devrient, and following some critical comments by the latter on the obscurity of the subject, he drafted a two-scene prologue which filled in some of the background story. This new prose draft was cast almost entirely in dialogue, much of it already very close to the final verse form it would take. By 12 November the revised draft of Siegfried's Tod was completed, and by 28 November it had been turned into alliterative verse, becoming in the process a fully fledged libretto for a three-act opera with a two-scene prologue. The following month (presumably) Wagner prepared the first fair copy (Zweitschrift des Textbuches), but almost immediately the work was extensively revised and a second fair copy (Drittschrift des Textbuches) was drawn up to reflect these revisions. It was at this stage that the episode known as "Hagen's Watch" (the final section of Act I Scene 2) made its first appearance.

With its two-scene prologue and three-act structure, Siegfried's Tod was to all intents and purposes a draft text for what would eventually be the final part of the tetralogy, Götterdämmerung (Twilight of the Gods).

At this point, however, Wagner, it seems, began to doubt the wisdom of writing an opera on such an obscure subject. Even in Germany the Nibelungenlied was not very well known, and several of the other sources that he consulted were even more recondite. Whatever the reason, the fact of the matter is that having completed the libretto of Siegfried's Tod, Wagner then put the work aside and turned his attention to other matters. Between December 1848 and March 1850, he wrote several influential essays, some of them quite lengthy. He also spent much of this time working out detailed scenarios for several other operas on a variety of historical and mythical figures: Jesus Christ, Achilles, Friedrich Barbarossa and Wieland der Schmied. None of these operas ever saw the light of day, though one musical sketch survives for Jesus von Nazareth.

== Politics ==
It was also around this time that Wagner was most actively engaged in German politics. Dresden had long been known as a cultural centre for liberals and democrats; the anarchist newspaper Dresdner Zeitung was partly edited by the music director August Röckel, and contained articles by Mikhail Bakunin, who came to Dresden in March 1849. Röckel also published the popular democratic newspaper Volksblätter. The activities of these radicals culminated in the May Uprising of 1849. Wagner, who had been inspired with the revolutionary spirit since 1848, cultivated Röckel's friendship and through him became acquainted with Bakunin. He wrote passionate articles in the Volksblätter inciting the people to revolt, and when the fighting broke out he played a small though significant role in it, possibly ordering hand grenades and certainly standing as a look out at the top of the Kreuzkirche.

The revolution was quickly crushed by Saxon and Prussian troops, and warrants were issued for the arrest of the leading revolutionaries, including Wagner. Röckel and Bakunin were captured and sentenced to lengthy terms of imprisonment. Wagner, however, made good his escape, and with the help of Franz Liszt he fled to Switzerland, from where he eventually made his way to Paris. In July he returned to Switzerland and settled in Zürich, which was to be his home for the greater part of the next nine years.

There, in May 1850, he once again took up Siegfried's Tod. He prepared a third fair copy of the libretto (Viertschrift des Textbuches) for publication, which, however, did not take place, and by July he had even begun to compose music for the prologue. Of this music a sheet of preliminary sketches survives and a more detailed composition draft, which extends about one quarter of the way into the duet between Brünnhilde and Siegfried. Having reached this point, however, Wagner abandoned the work.

== Trilogy ==
The earliest mention we have of a festival theatre being specially constructed for a performance of Siegfried's Tod is in a letter to the artist Ernst Benedikt Kietz, dated 14 September 1850. A week later in a letter to his friend Theodor Uhlig, dated 22 September, Wagner elaborated on this idea: now he was hoping to stage three performances of Siegfried's Tod in a specially constructed festival theatre, after which both the theatre and the score were to be destroyed: "If everything is arranged satisfactorily, I will allow three performances of Siegfried [i.e. Siegfried's Tod] to be given in one week under these circumstances: after the third performance the theatre is to be torn down and my score burned...."

Gradually the notion of a trilogy of operas culminating with Siegfried's Tod was beginning to form in Wagner's mind. The idea was not a new one. In 1847 he had read and been deeply impressed by Aeschylus's Greek trilogy the Oresteia in a German translation by Johann Gustav Droysen; and in 1849, after his flight from Dresden, he had read Droysen's reconstruction of the same playwright's trilogy the Prometheia, which includes the well-known tragedy Prometheus Bound. It seemed only right that a similar trilogy of German tragedies, written by a latter-day Aeschylus, should be performed in its own dedicated theatre and as part of a "specially-appointed festival".

The idea of expanding Siegfried's Tod into a series of two or more operas would have been particularly appealing to Wagner, as he had now come to realize that it would be impossible to say all that he wanted to in a single opera without an inordinate number of digressions. The political events of the past few years and his recent discovery of the philosophy of Ludwig Feuerbach had greatly enlarged the scope of ideas which he hoped to explore in his new opera. He also wished to incorporate various ideas that he had been mulling over in the works on Jesus, Frederick, Achilles and Wieland (all four of which had been effectively abandoned by now). These ideas ranged over the politics of Pierre-Joseph Proudhon and Mikhail Bakunin and the philosophy of Hegel and the Young Hegelians.

In the winter of 1850–1851, while he was working on Opera and Drama, Wagner toyed with the idea of writing a comic opera based on a well-known folk-tale, Vor einem, der auszug, das Fürchten zu lernen (The Boy Who Set Out to Learn Fear), which he had come across in Grimms' Fairy Tales. "Imagine my surprise," he later wrote to his friend the violinist Theodor Uhlig, "when I suddenly realized that this youth was none other than young Siegfried!"

Within a week, in May 1851, he had drawn up some fragmentary prose sketches for a prequel, or "comic counterpart", to Siegfried's Tod, which he called Jung-Siegfried (Young Siegfried), later altering the title to Der junge Siegfried (The Young Siegfried). A more extensive prose draft was completed by 1 June, and by 24 June this had been transformed into a verse draft. By August the fair copy of this verse libretto was finished and Wagner had even begun to set it to music. These efforts, however, never amounted to anything more than a handful of sketches, which were later used in the composition of Siegfried.

The earliest mention we have of a festival of three operas based on the Nibelungenlied is in the autobiographical work Eine Mittheilung an meine Freunde (A Communication to My Friends), which Wagner originally wrote in August 1851: "I propose to produce my myth in three complete dramas...."

Der junge Siegfried and Siegfried's Tod were now clearly envisaged as the second and third dramas of a trilogy. By October, however, Wagner had decided that this trilogy required a prelude – was he thinking again of Aeschylus and the ancient Greeks, whose trilogies were usually accompanied by a satyr play? – and the text of Eine Mittheilung was duly altered to reflect the change. To the sentence quoted above he added the words, "which will be preceded by a great prelude". Nevertheless, Wagner always referred to the Ring as a trilogy rather than a tetralogy. He envisaged it being performed as part of a three-day festival preceded by a preliminary evening. Thanks to Aeschylus and his contemporaries, the term trilogy had a certain cachet for Wagner which the term tetralogy never acquired.

In October 1851 Wagner drafted a short prose sketch for the preliminary opera which would precede the trilogy proper. He vacillated over the title of the work, trying out in turn, Der Raub: Vorspiel (The Theft: Prelude), Der Raub des Rheingoldes (The Theft of the Rhinegold) and Das Rheingold (Vorspiel) (The Rhinegold (Prelude)). The following month he drafted some prose sketches for the first of the three main dramas, Siegmund und Sieglinde: der Walküre Bestrafung (Siegmund and Sieglinde: the Valkyrie's Punishment). Between March and November 1852 he elaborated these short sketches after his usual practice, developing prose drafts from them, which he then proceeded to turn into verse drafts. By that time he had renamed the operas Das Rheingold and Die Walküre respectively.

Whereas the prose draft of Das Rheingold was written before that of Die Walküre, the verse draft of Die Walküre preceded that of Das Rheingold. So while there is some truth to the oft-quoted remark that the Ring cycle was conceived backwards, it is not completely accurate.

The original prose sketch for Das Rheingold consisted of just three paragraphs, each prefaced by a Roman numeral. It would appear from this that Wagner originally conceived it as a three-act opera in its own right, and this is confirmed by a letter he wrote in October 1851 to his friend Theodor Uhlig: "Great plans for Siegfried: three dramas, with a three-act prelude.". By 1852, however, Das Rheingold had become a one-act opera in four scenes. Nevertheless, there are good reasons for regarding the opening scene of the opera as a prologue ("The Theft of the Gold") to the main part of the drama ("Valhalla"). Thus, both Das Rheingold and Götterdämmerung share the same prologue-plus-trilogy structure which characterises the Ring cycle as a whole.

As for Die Walküre, the first act of this opera probably gave Wagner more trouble than any other act in the entire tetralogy. In his two prose sketches for it Wotan enters Hunding's house in his guise as Der Wanderer ("The Wanderer") and thrusts the sword into the ash tree, which Siegmund then withdraws only minutes later; the fully worked-out prose draft also brings Wotan onto the stage. It was only at a later stage in the evolution of the text that Wagner banished the Wanderer and his sword to the backstory which Sieglinde narrates to Siegmund. Now the sword is already embedded in the tree as the curtain goes up on Act 1 and Siegmund's withdrawal of it becomes a climactic piece of dramaturgy.

== Opera and Drama ==
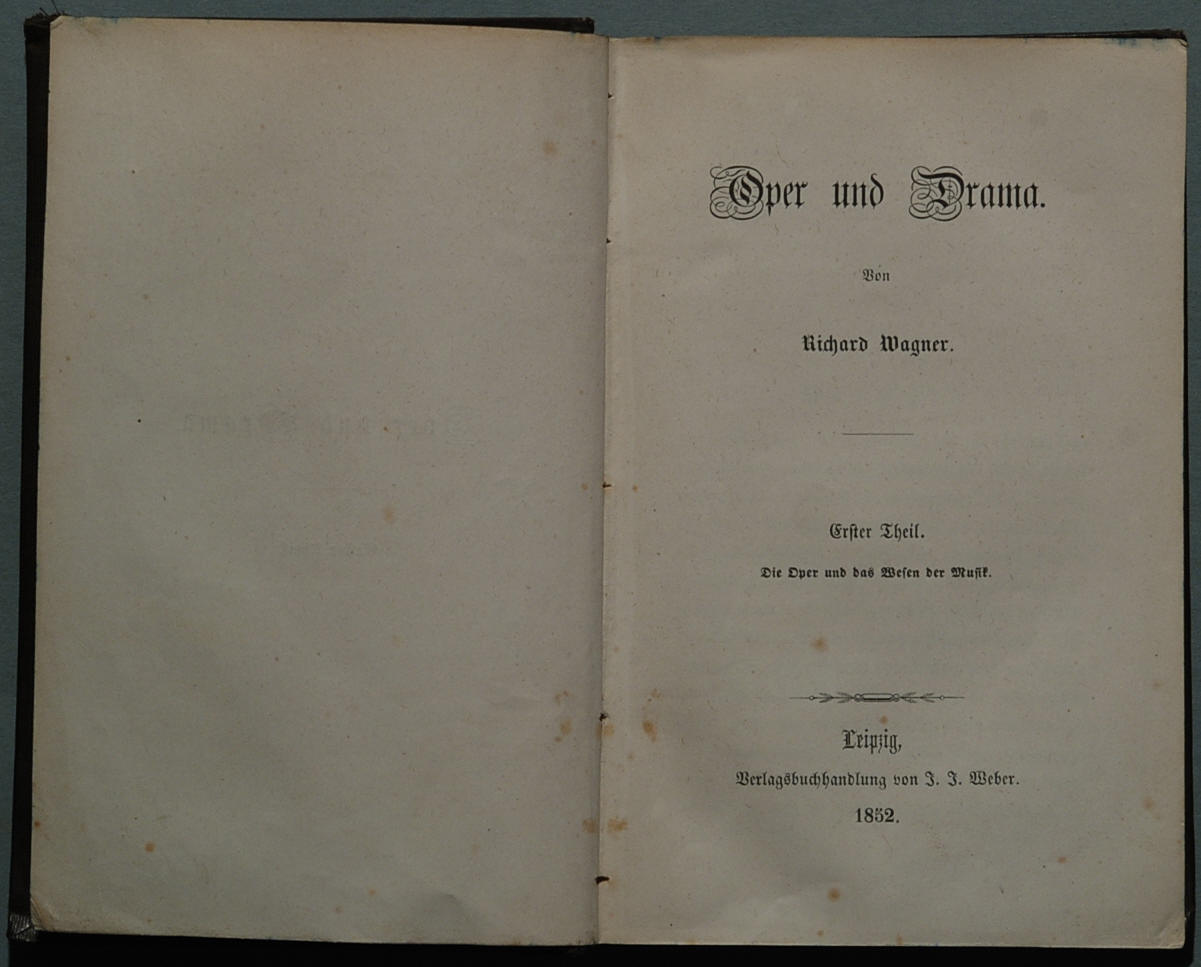
The title page of Oper und Drama

Parallel to these renewed efforts on The Ring was Wagner's work on a lengthy essay entitled Oper und Drama ("Opera and Drama"), which musicologist Deryck Cooke (1979) has described as, "essentially a blueprint [for the Ring]". Wagner's principal theoretical work, Oper und Drama grew out of a draft of an essay on Das Wesen der Oper ("The Essence of Opera"), which, preparatory to the composition of Siegfried's Tod, he wrote in an attempt "to tidy up a whole life that now lay behind me, to articulate each half-formed intuition on a conscious level....". First mentioned in a letter to Theodor Uhlig on 20 September 1850, the work was begun by 9 October. Wagner, it seems, anticipated that it would be no longer than the other essays he had recently completed; but over the winter of 1850–1851, it grew into a book of some considerable size. Completed by 20 January 1851, just four months after Wagner conceived it, it was first published in 1852 by J. J. Weber of Leipzig. It was in the pages of Opera and Drama that Wagner's nebulous or half-conscious ideas on artistic method and the relationship between music and drama were first given concrete expression.

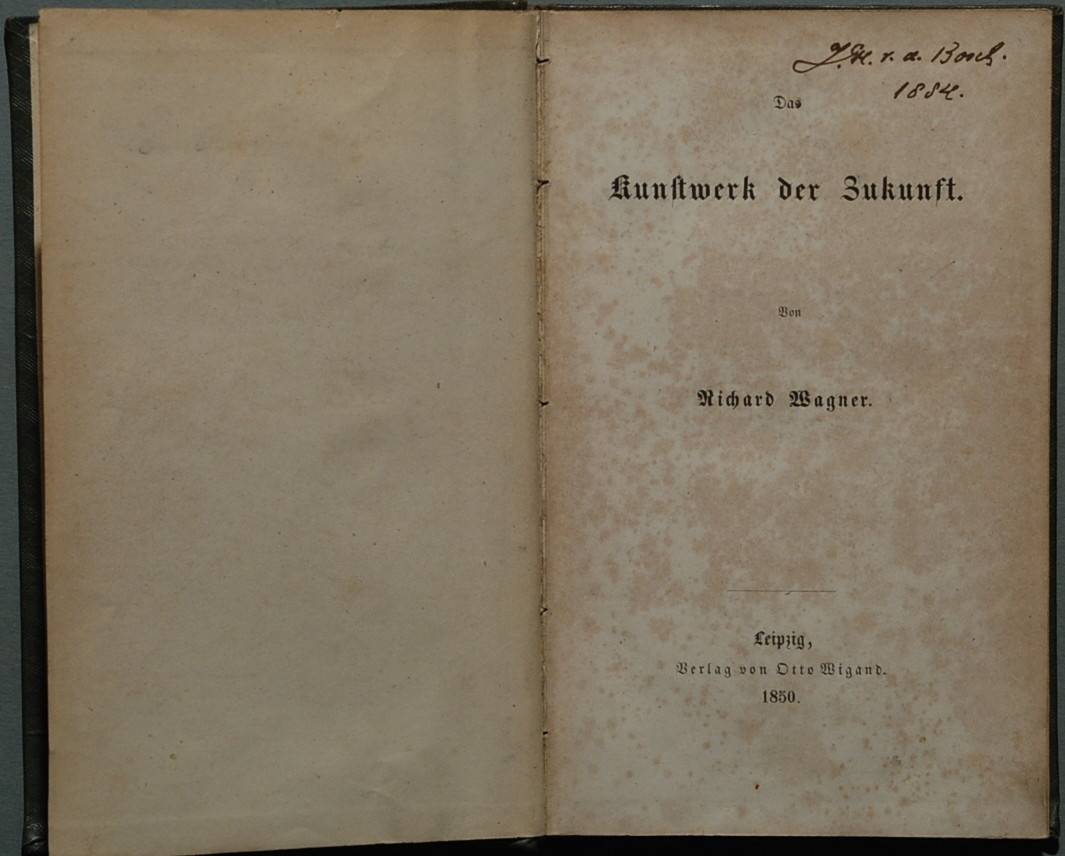
The title page of Das Kunstwerk der Zukunft

Appreciation of The Ring, and of the ideas which inform it, is assisted by placing it in the context of Wagner's wider literary and political endeavours of the period. Four of his prose works, the so-called "Zürich Manifestos", which helped to establish Wagner's reputation as a controversial writer) are particularly relevant:

- Die Kunst und die Revolution (Art and Revolution, July 1849)
- Das Kunstwerk der Zukunft (The Art-Work of the Future, November 1849)
- Kunst und Klima (Art and Climate, March 1850)
- Oper und Drama (Opera and Drama, January 1851)

== Der Ring des Nibelungen ==
It was in 1852 that Wagner finally settled upon the name Der Ring des Nibelungen for the complete cycle. Other titles that were considered and rejected included: Das Gold des Nibelungen (The Gold of the Nibelung), which appeared on the title page of the verse draft of Die Walküre; and Der Reif des Nibelungen (The Ring of the Nibelung), which was mentioned in a letter to August Röckel, dated 12 September 1852. On 14 October 1852, however, Wagner informed Theodor Uhlig that he had finally decided that the title of the entire cycle would be Der Ring des Nibelungen (The Ring of the Nibelung, or The Nibelung's Ring).

In November and December 1852, Wagner made extensive revisions to the libretti of Der junge Siegfried and Siegfried's Tod. This was partly to accommodate the expansion of the cycle and the growing significance of Wotan, the protagonist of the first two parts of the tetralogy, and partly to reflect Wagner's reading of the philosophy of Ludwig Feuerbach (see below). The changes to Der junge Siegfried were entered into the first fair copy (Reinschrift des Textbuches), while those to Siegfried's Tod were entered into the third fair copy (Viertschrift des Textbuches). In each case several pages of the fair copy were replaced with newly written ones. The principal changes to Siegfried's Tod involved the opening scene of the prologue (the Norns scene), Brünnhilde's scene with Waltraute (which had originally included all nine Valkyries), and Brünnhilde's closing speech at the end of the opera.

Fair copies of Das Rheingold and Die Walküre and a fourth fair copy of Siegfried's Tod (Fünftschrift des Textbuches) were completed by 15 December 1852 and the entire text was privately published in February 1853. Fifty copies were printed, most of which were given to Wagner’s friends. Over the course of four evenings (16–19 February 1853) Wagner gave a public reading of the complete text in Zürich's Hôtel Baur au Lac. This text, however, did not represent the final version, as Wagner often made changes to his libretti while he was setting them to music. In the case of the Ring such changes were duly entered into Wagner's personal copy of the 1853 printing; but not all of these emendations were incorporated in either the public printing of 1863 or the version in the Gesammelte Schriften und Dichtungen of 1872, a situation which has caused unending problems for scholars, translators and performers alike.

Furthermore, it was probably not until 1856 that Wagner definitively changed the titles of the third and fourth parts of the Ring to Siegfried and Götterdämmerung respectively. In 1863 the texts of all four Ring operas were published for the first time under their present titles.

== The end of the Ring ==
The final scene of the Ring probably caused Wagner more trouble than any other. He rewrote the text for it several times and his final thoughts were never made absolutely clear. Six or seven different versions exist or can be reconstructed from Wagner's drafts:

- Original Ending (early December 1848) – Wagner's first ending for the cycle was optimistic and confident. The ring is returned to the Rhine; Alberich and the Nibelungs, who were enslaved by the power of the ring, are liberated. In her closing speech, Brünnhilde declares that Wotan is all-powerful and everlasting; she gives up her own life and leads Siegfried to Valhalla, where he is reconciled with Wotan and order is restored. Siegfried and Brünnhilde are depicted rising above Siegfried's funeral pyre to Valhalla to cleanse Wotan of his crime and redeem the gods, rather as The Dutchman and Senta ascend above the clouds at the end of Der fliegende Holländer. A major difference between this draft and subsequent revisions is that there is no suggestion here that the Gods are destroyed. Brünnhilde's final oration stresses the cleansing effect of Siegfried's death:

"Hear then, you mighty Gods. Your guilt is abolished: the hero takes it upon himself. The Nibelungs’ slavery is at an end, and Alberich shall again be free. This Ring I give to you, wise sisters of the watery deeps. Melt it down and keep it free from harm."

- First Revision (before 18 December 1848) – the second fair copy of the libretto for Siegfried's Tod (Drittschrift des Textbuches) was made almost immediately after the first. It incorporates several revisions, most of which are quite minor, and none of which affects the ending. The only major change, as noted above, was the addition of the Hagen's Watch episode to Act I. After completing this fair copy, however, Wagner made two marginal alterations to Brünnhilde's closing speech. In the first of these she declares that the gods have now atoned for their misrule of the world, and she urges them to accept Siegfried as a new member of the Norse pantheon. This was clearly an attempt by Wagner to restore Siegfried's role as Christlike redeemer of the gods, taking their guilt upon himself and by his death atoning for their sins. The second alteration, added later, is quite different. Brünnhilde now admonishes the gods to "depart powerless", leaving the world to mankind;

"Fade away in bliss before the deed of Man: the hero you created. I proclaim to you freedom from fear, through blessed redemption in death."

- May 1850 Revision – in May 1850 Wagner made a third fair copy of the text (Viertschrift des Textbuches) in the hopes of having it published. Unfortunately this manuscript, which is presently in the Bayreuth Archives, is fragmentary, some of its pages having been discarded during the next revision, for which it was the source-text. Among the missing pages are the final few, so it is impossible to tell whether either of the marginal verses added to the final page of the second fair copy was incorporated into Brünnhilde's closing speech.
- Feuerbach Ending (November and December 1852) – by the time Wagner had completed the libretti for Das Rheingold and Die Walküre, he had come to realize that the cycle must end with the destruction by fire of both Valhalla and the gods. This necessitated further and far-reaching revisions of both Der junge Siegfried and Siegfried's Tod. The new ending of the latter was influenced by Wagner's reading of Ludwig Feuerbach, whose writing suggested that Gods were the construction of human minds, and that love had primacy over all other human endeavours. In this Feuerbach ending Brünnhilde proclaims the destruction of the Gods and their replacement with a human society ruled by love:

"The holiest hoard of my wisdom I bequeath to the world. Not wealth, not gold, nor godly splendour; not house, not court, nor overbearing pomp; not troubled treaties’ deceiving union, nor the dissembling custom of harsh law: Rapture in joy and sorrow comes from love alone."

This ending was added by Wagner to the third fair copy (Viertschrift des Textbuches) of the work. Although the Feuerbachian lines were eventually dropped, the other significant change to the ending (viz. the substitution of the gods’ destruction for the liberation of the Nibelungs) was retained in all subsequent versions.

- Schopenhauer Ending (1856) – following his discovery of the philosophy of Arthur Schopenhauer and his growing interest in Buddhist philosophy, Wagner once again changed the ending of the Ring. The Schopenhauer ending stressed self-overcoming, resignation and the illusory nature of human existence, in keeping with the notion of negation of the Will. Brünnhilde sees herself redeemed from the endless cycle of birth, suffering, death and rebirth; enlightened by love, she achieves the state of non-being, or Nirvana. Wagner wrote out a prose sketch of this new ending in 1856 (WWV 86D Text VIIIb), but he did not set it to verse until 1871 or 1872, adding the text and its fair copy to his personal copy of the 1853 printing of the Ring libretti. Brünnhilde's new verses (which were intended to precede the passage beginning, "Grane, mein Ross") close with the words:

"Were I no more to fare to Valhalla's fortress, do you know whither I fare? I depart from the home of desire, I flee forever the home of delusion; the open gates of eternal becoming I close behind me now: To the holiest chosen land, free from desire and delusion, the goal of the world's migration, redeemed from incarnation, the enlightened woman now goes. The blessed end of all things eternal, do you know how I attained it? Grieving love's profoundest suffering opened my eyes for me: I saw the world end."

- Final Ending (1874) – when Wagner finally came to set the ending to music in 1874, he reverted to the 1852 revision, but shorn of its closing Feuerbachian lines. Although Wagner never set either the Schopenhauerian or the Feuerbachian lines, he did include them as footnotes in the final printed edition of the text, together with a note to the effect that while he preferred the Schopenhauerian lines, he declined to set them because their meaning was better expressed by the music alone. In other words, the ending he finally set to music is Schopenhauerian in its intention even though this is never stated explicitly in the libretto.

== See also ==
- Der Ring des Nibelungen: Composition of the music
