= Sailing, Sailing =

1880 song by James Frederick Swift

Song
- Written: 1880
- Published: 1880
- Genre: Folk
- Songwriter: Godfrey Marks

"Sailing, Sailing" is a song written in 1880 by Godfrey Marks, a pseudonym of British organist and composer James Frederick Swift (1847–1931). It is also known as "Sailing" or "Sailing, sailing, over the bounding main" (the first line of its chorus). The song's chorus is widely known and appears in many children's songbooks. The preceding verses are little known possibly due to not being caught on. It appears in Disney's 1961 Goofy short Aquamania. The song also appears on Disney's Sing-Along Songs Volume 6 - 'Under The Sea' which also features the Sailor's Hornpipe during which Ludwig Von Drake is setting off on a cruise to find the Little Mermaid. More recently it appeared in series 3 of the 2015 TV show Thunderbirds Are Go. It is based on “Oh Better Far To Live and Die” from The Pirates of Penzance by Gilbert and Sullivan

== Lyrics ==
Verse 1
Y'heave ho! my lads, the wind blows free,
A pleasant gale is on our lee,
And soon across the ocean clear
Our gallant barque shall bravely steer;
But ere we part from England's shore tonight,
A song we'll sing for home and beauty bright.

Then here's to the sailor, and here's to the hearts so true,
Who will think of him upon the waters blue!

Chorus
Sailing, sailing, over the bounding main;
For many a stormy wind shall blow, ere Jack comes home again.
Sailing, sailing, over the bounding main;
For many a stormy wind shall blow ere Jack comes home again!
Verse 2
The sailor's life is bold and free,
His home is on the rolling sea;
And never heart more true or brave,
Than his who launches on the wave;
Afar he speeds in distant climes to roam,
With jocund song he rides the sparkling foam.

Then here's to the sailor, and here's to the hearts so true,
Who will think of him upon the waters blue!

(Repeat Chorus)
Verse 3
The tide is flowing with the gale,
Y'heave ho, my lads! set ev'ry sail;
The harbor bar we soon shall clear;
Farewell once more to home so dear;
For when the tempest rages loud and long,
That home shall be our guiding star and song.

Then here's to the sailor, and here's to the hearts so true,
Who will think of him upon the waters blue!

(Repeat Chorus)
