= Hugo Staehle =

German composer (1826–1848)

Hugo Staehle (21 June 1826, Fulda – 29 March 1848, Kassel) was a German composer.

Staehle was the son of a Hessian army officer. He studied violin and piano with Wilhelm Beichert and composition with Moritz Hauptmann. When Hauptmann went to Leipzig, Staehle studied with Louis Spohr. For part of the years 1843-45, he studied piano with Louis Plaidy, violin with Ferdinand David, and composition with Moritz Hauptmann in Leipzig. He returned to Kassel where he studied and lived with Spohr until he died from meningitis at the age of 21.

He wrote at least one opera (Arria, 1846), one symphony (Symphony No. 1 in C-minor, 1844), one concert overture, one piano quartet, and a couple of song cycles.
