= Timothy Olmstead =

Timothy Olmstead (1759–1848) was a Connecticut psalmodist and one of the first American composers. He was also a Connecticut fifer during the American Revolutionary War.

== Scores ==
Collected Works of Eliakim Doolittle (1772-1850) and Timothy Olmstead (1759-1848): Music of the New American Nation Sacred Music from 1780 to 1820 Published: 1999, Publisher: Taylor & Francis Inc - ISBN 0815324111
