= Axel Grandjean =

Danish composer and conductor

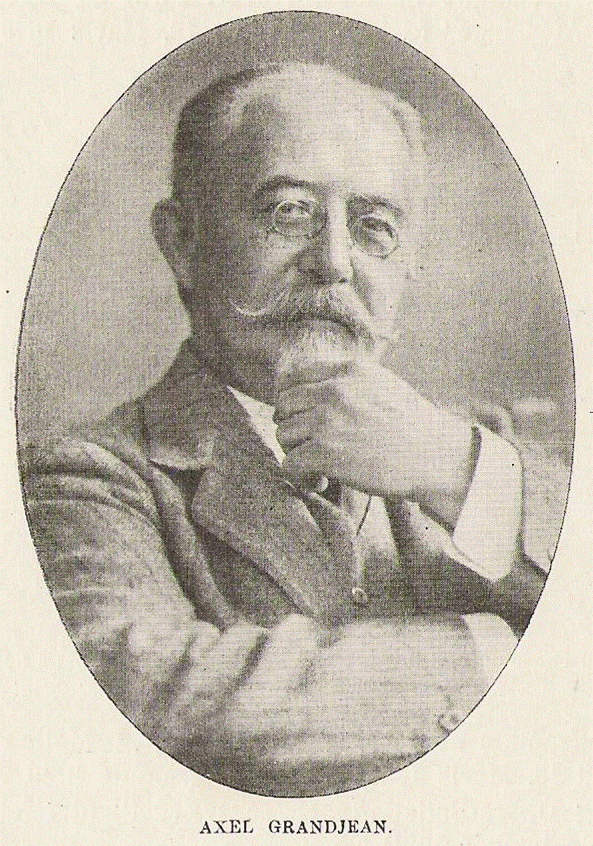
Axel Grandjean

Axel Carl William Grandjean (9 March 1847 – 11 February 1932) was a Danish composer and conductor.

He was one of the first students at the Royal Danish Academy of Music with dignified teachers such as Niels Gade, Johann Peter Emilius Hartmann, August Winding and Johann Christian Gebauer. He also tried as an actor, when in 1869 he successfully played the role of the playwright Jean de France. He gave up the idea and concentrated on music.

That same year he took on a study trip to Germany and Paris. After his return he worked as a music teacher and now as a conductor. In 1899-1918 he was at the Danish Royal Theatre. He directed the music for some plays and ballets. In parallel with this work he composed some operas. He also composed many songs and piano arrangements, including a 3 volume work of a variety of songs from the 19th century Vaudeville. In 1917 he became a Knight of the Dannebrog and in 1919 he published his memoirs.

He died in 1932. He was survived by his son Poul Bredo Grandjean.
