= Raoul Poliakin =

American orchestra conductor (1917 - 1981)

Raoul Poliakin (1917–1981) was an Egyptian-born American arranger and conductor of popular orchestral music. He appeared on countless albums, including those of Frank Sinatra, Perry Como, Bing Crosby, Dean Martin, Sarah Vaughan, Peggy Lee, Artie Shaw, Tommy Dorsey, Antonio Carlos Jobim and Wes Montgomery.

Born in Cairo, Egypt, Poliakin received his musical education at the University of Paris (known as the Sorbonne), where he studied violin with Rene Benedetti and conducted with Pierre Monteux. In 1941, he immigrated to the United States, where he became a member of several major symphony orchestras, playing under Leopold Stokowski, Sir Thomas Beecham, Fritz Reiner, Monteux and Ernst Ansermet.

As assistant conductor to Andre Kostelanetz, Poliakin produced a series of albums for Everest Records in the 1950s. As overall music director, he planned the classical repertoire and supervised the actual recording sessions. In addition, he conducted his own fifty-four piece orchestra and twenty voice chorale, The Poliakin Orchestra and Chorale, which recorded arrangements of light orchestral music.

In addition, he was a licensed amateur radio (ham radio) operator under the call sign K2AOS.
