= Rudolf Tillmetz =

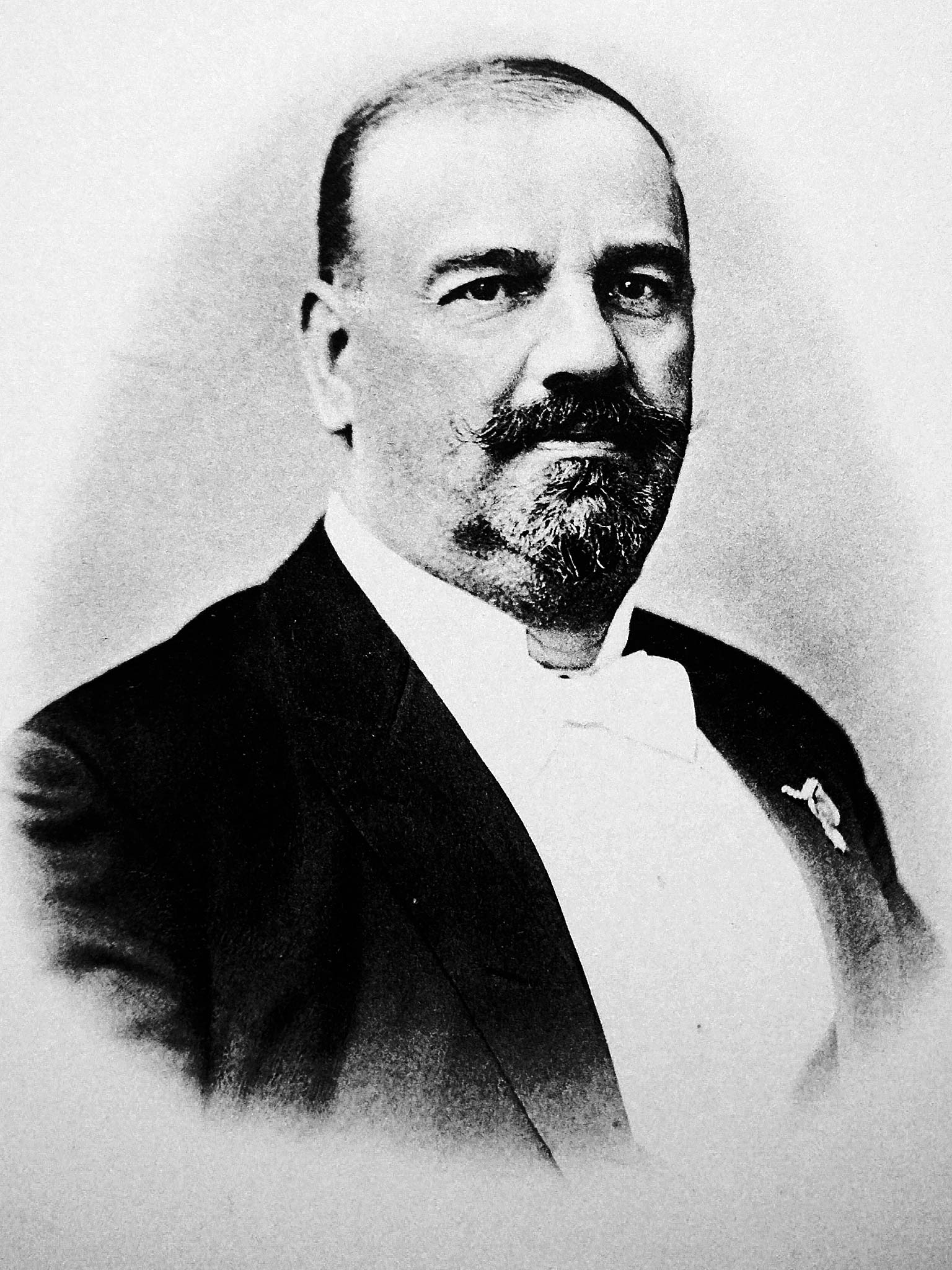
Rudolf Tillmetz

Rudolf Tillmetz (1 April 1847 – 25 January 1915) was a flute virtuoso and pedagogue from Munich, Germany. He was a great contributor to modern ideas on interpretation on the flute with his teachings and his technical writings. As a child Rudolf showed great promise as a musician and was provided a through musical education by his father, Franz Paul Tillmetz. After studying piano with Franz Barraga and music theory with Otto Muller he became a pupil of Theobald Boehm, who helped the young flutist establish his successful career.

His first performance was in 1858 in Munich, when he was just 11 years old. In 1864 he was appointed first flute at the Royal Bavarian Opera Orchestra, directed by Franz Lachner at the time. After teaching at the Royal Bavarian Cadetcorps for 12 years he was appointed flute teacher in 1883 at the Royal Music School.

== Works ==
Some of Tillmetz's works are:

For solo flute:

- 24 studies for the flute, Op. 12
- 26 studies in all keys
- Melodic studies, Op. 21
- 30 studies in duet form, Op. 52
- 12 rhythmic exercises in duet form, Op. 54

For two flutes:

- 28 Etudes Melodiques (en forme de duo), Op. 47

For flute and piano:

- Album leaf, Op. 8
- Fantasiestuck, Op. 9
- Six easy solos, Op. 10
- Andante and polonaise, Op. 15
- Nocturno, alpine round, and rondoletta pastorale, Op. 17
- Six solo, Op. 28
- Six characteristic solos, Op. 32
- Lyric pieces, Op. 33
- Fantasie pastorale roumaine, Op. 34
- Notturno, Op. 50

For flute and orchestra:

- Concert study for flute and orchestra, Op. 22
- Grand konzertstuck, Op. 23
- Hungarian fantasia, Op. 25

For flute, horn, and piano:

- Nocturne, Op. 31
