= Samuel Lover =

Irish composer, writer and painter

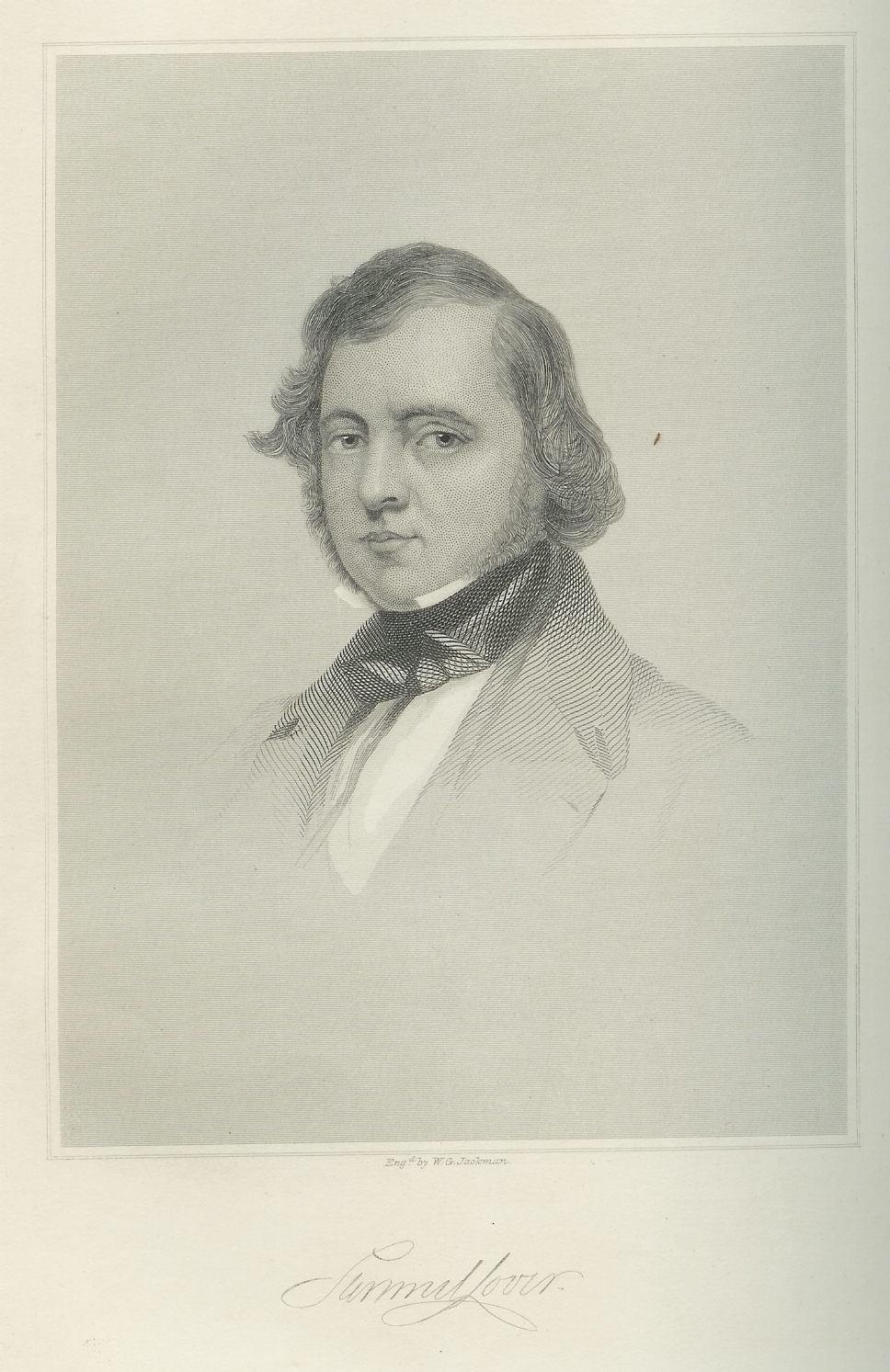
Samuel Lover

Samuel Lover (24 February 1797 – 6 July 1868), also known as "Ben Trovato" ("well invented"), was an Irish songwriter, composer and novelist, and a portrait painter, chiefly in miniatures. He was the grandfather of Victor Herbert.

== Life ==
The Angel's Whisper

A baby was sleeping;
Its mother was weeping;
For her husband was far on the wild raging sea;
And the tempest was swelling
Round the fisherman's dwelling;
And she cried, "Dermot, darling, O come back
to me!"

Her beads while she numbered,
The baby still slumbered,
And smiled in her face as she bended her knee;
"O, blest be that warning,
My child, thy sleep adorning,
For I know that the angels are whispering with
thee.

"And while they are keeping
Bright watch o'er thy sleeping,
O, pray to them softly, my baby, with me!
And say thou wouldst rather
They'd watch o'er thy father!
For I know that the angels are whispering to
thee."

The dawn of the morning
Saw Dermot returning,
And the wife wept with joy her babe's father to see;
And closely caressing
Her child with a blessing,
Said, "I knew that the angels were whispering
with thee."

— By Samuel Lover

Lover was born at No. 60 Grafton Street, Dublin and went to school at Samuel Whyte's at No. 79, which now houses Bewley's Café. By 1830 he was Secretary of the Royal Hibernian Academy and living at No. 9 D'Olier Street. In 1835 he moved to London and began composing music for a series of comic stage works. For some, like the operetta Il Paddy Whack in Italia (1841), he contributed libretto and music, for others just a few songs. Before committing himself to a literary career, he enjoyed considerable success as a miniature painter.

Lover produced many Irish songs, of which several, such as The Angel's Whisper, Molly Bawn, and The Four-leaved Shamrock, gained popularity. He also wrote novels, of which Rory O'Moore (in its first form a ballad) and Handy Andy are best known, and short Irish sketches, which with his songs he combined into a popular entertainment called Irish Nights or Irish Evenings, with which he toured North America in 1846–1848. He joined Charles Dickens in founding Bentley's Magazine.

"When once the itch of literature comes over a man, nothing can cure it but the scratching of a pen." – Samuel Lover

Lover's daughter Fanny was mother to Victor Herbert, a composer remembered for many musicals and operettas premièred on Broadway. As a child he lived with the Lovers in a musical environment after the divorce of his mother.

== Death and legacy ==
Lover died on 6 July 1868 in Saint Helier, Jersey. A memorial in St Patrick's Cathedral, Dublin marks his achievements: "Poet, painter, novelist and composer, who, in the exercise of a genius as distinguished in its versatility as in its power, by his pen and pencil illustrated so happily the characteristics of the peasantry of his country that his name will ever be honourably identified with Ireland."

=== In popular culture ===
In the 2013 computer game "BioShock Infinite", the Lover piece "Saddle The Pony" (from Rory O'More), is heard in Battleship Bay, where Elizabeth is seen dancing to it. It is performed by an accordion player, a violinist and a pianist.

== Selected writings ==
- Songs and Legends of the Irish People (1831)
- Legends and Stories of Ireland (London: Richard Edward King, n.d. [1834])
- Rory O'More: A National Romance. Novel (London: R. Bentley, 1837; repr. London: F. Warne & Co., 1879)
- Songs and Ballads (London: Chapman and Hall, 1839)
- Handy Andy. A Tale of Irish Life (London: George Routledge and Sons, 1841)
- Treasure Trove/He Would Be a Gentleman

== Selected compositions ==
Stage (to his own librettos)

- Rory O'More, comic opera (1837)
- The White Horse of the Peppers, dramatic romance (1838)
- Snap Apple Night, or A Kick-up in Kerry, musical drama (1839)
- The Greek Boy, musical drama (1840)
- Il Paddy Whack in Italia, 1-act-operetta (1841)
- The Irish Tourist's Ticket [music only, text by P.H. Hatch] (1853)

== Bibliography ==
- William Bayle Bernard: Life of Samuel Lover (London: H.S. King & Co. and New York: D. Appleton & Co., 1874)
- Andrew James Symington: Samuel Lover: A Biographical Sketch (London: Blackie & Son, 1880)
