= Laura Emeline Newell =

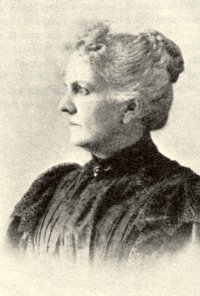
Laura Emeline Newell

Laura Emeline Pixley Newell (February 5, 1854 – October 13, 1916) was an American songwriter, known for having composed over 400 hymns.

== Early life ==
Laura Emeline Pixley Newell was born in New Marlborough, Massachusetts, on February 5, 1854. She was a daughter of Edward A. Pixley (1833-1886) and Anna Laura Osborn (1835-1854). Her mother died when Laura was only a few days old, and the child was adopted by her aunt, Mrs. Hiram Mabie and later Mrs. E. H. Emerson, of New York City.

In 1858, the Mabies moved to a farm south of Wamego, Kansas. Two years after the move, Hiram Mabie died, and his wife resumed teaching and in 1860 moved to Topeka, Kansas. Newell studied under her.

== Career ==
Newell was a prolific writer of songs and poems. She began to write poetry at an early age, publishing when she was fourteen years old. Many of her early productions appeared in local papers. Her first attempt to enter a broader field was made in Arthur's Magazine. Several of her songs were set to music and published in the East Coast, and since their appearance she devoted herself mainly to the writing of songs for sacred or secular music.

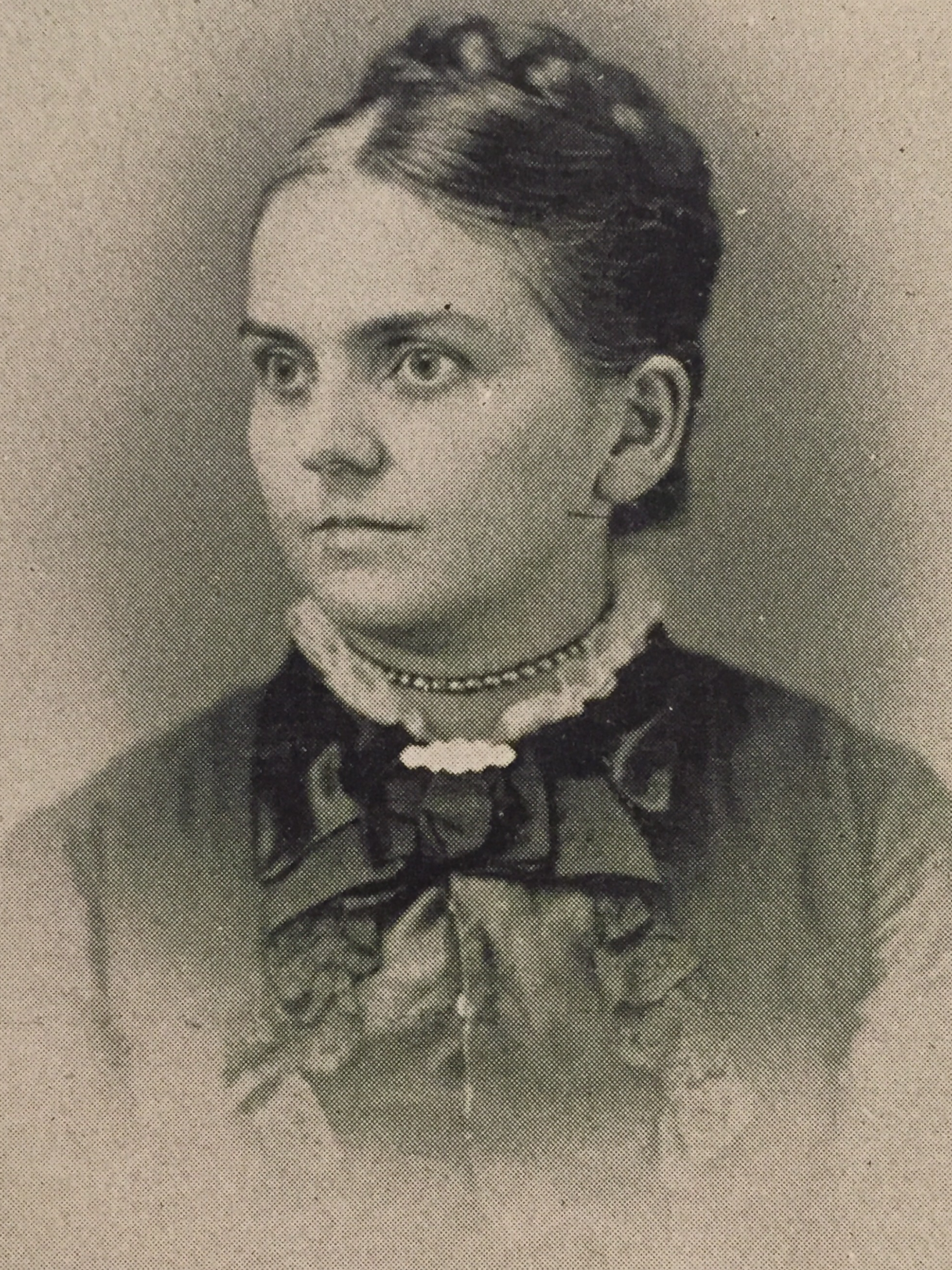
Laura Emeline Newell, 1893

Throughout her career, she has written and published over four thousand poems and songs. Besides those, she also wrote verses. In 1890 several hundreds of her productions were published in various forms. She wrote in all veins, but her particular liking was for sacred songs. She also adapted words to music for composers. In 1891 a Chicago house published a children's day service of hers, entitled "Gems for His Crown," over eighteen-thousand copies of which were readily sold. In 1892 the same firm accepted three services of hers, "Grateful Offerings to Our King," a children's day service, "Harvest Sheaves," for Thanksgiving or harvest home exercises, and "The Prince of Peace," a Christmas service.

== Personal life ==
Her home was in Zeandale, Kansas. In 1871 she married Lauren Newell (1838-1921), an architect and builder, and he worked at his trade. Her family consisted of six children.

She died on October 13, 1916, in Manhattan, Kansas, and is buried at Wabaunsee Cemetery, Wabaunsee, Kansas.
