= Faust Overture =

Concert overture by Richard Wagner

Thematic reduction of Faust Overture. The tempo markings are incorrect.

The Faust Overture is a concert overture by German composer Richard Wagner. Originally composed between 1839 and 1840, Wagner intended it to be the first movement of a Faust Symphony based on the Faust legend and play by German playwright Johann Wolfgang von Goethe. Eventually, Wagner abandoned writing the planned symphony and composed instead a single-movement concert overture, incorporating ideas from the other sketched movements. He made a final revision to the score in 1855. The Faust Overture is one of the few compositions by Wagner which was written for the concert hall, rather than the theatre.

== See also ==
- Faust Symphony by Franz Liszt
