= Philip Klitz =

Philip Klitz (7 January 1805 – 13 January 1854) was a British-born composer.

== Early life and family ==
Klitz was born in Lymington, Hampshire. His father, George Philip Klitz, a drum-major of the royal Flintshire militia and musical composer, was born at Biebrich, Germany, in 1777, and died at Lymington in 1839. In 1801, he married Elizabeth Lane of Boldre (1775–1838), with whom he had six sons who became musicians:

- Philip, the eldest.
- William, organist of St. Michael's Church, Basingstoke, died 31 May 1857.
- Charles, organist of St. Thomas's Church, Lymington, died 16 February 1864.
- James Frederick, died at Northampton 2 October 1870.
- Robert John (1815-1899)
- John Henry, died 6 December 1880, who by will, founded the Widow and Orphans British and Foreign Musical Society.

== Career ==
Philip became a composer of ball-room music at an early age. Around 1829, he took up residence at Southampton where besides classical music, he produced a variety of ballads of which the words were frequently his own. He played the violin and pianoforte, and in 1831, conducted Paganini's Southampton performance. His lectures on music, given in literary institutions and other places, were well attended, and his advocacy of the Hullah system met with much success.

He was the first organist of St. Lawrence and St Joseph Church, Southampton, and from 1845 to his death, of All Saints' Church. He published songs of the Mid-watch, the poetry of Captain Willes Johnson, and the music created for, and dedicated to, the British Navy in 1838. The admiralty ordered the reprinting of six songs, which were included in a book named "Songs of Charles Dibdin, arranged by T. Dibdin," 1850, pp. 315–20. Aside from his compositions for the piano, in 1850, he wrote a book called "Sketches of Life, Character, and Scenery in the New Forest: a series of Tales, Rural, Domestic, Legendary, and Humorous" as well as other musical compositions. He supported the fraternity, and his song "Faith, Hope, and Charity" is still played before events hosted by Hampshire lodges. He was one of the first people to write songs for the concerts of Ethiopian Serenaders. “Miss Ginger” and “Dinah Dear”, both in 1847, became popular jingles.

== Death ==
His wife was Charlotte Lyte, a half-sister of Henry Francis Lyte. His son, George Klitz, was also a voluminous musical composer and concertina player. He died at 24 Portland Place, Southampton on 13 January 1854, aged 49, of bronchitis.

== Bibliography ==
- R.E. Klitz, Philip (1850). Sketches of Life; Character and Scenery in the New Forest - A series of tales; rural; domestic; legendary and humorous. With selected illustrations. Stewart William Klitz.
