= 1460s in music =

List of years in music	(table)
- … 1450; 1451; 1452; 1453; 1454; 1455; 1456; 1457; 1458; 1459; 1460; 1461; 1462; 1463; 1464; 1465; 1466; 1467; 1468; 1469; 1470 …
- In art 1457 1458 1459 1460 1461 1462 1463
- Art; Archaeology; Architecture; Literature; Music; Philosophy; Science; +...

- 1460s in music
- 1470s
Other topics in 1460s:
- Art

Music timeline

This is a list of notable events in music that took place in the 1460s.

== Events ==
1464

- 22 February – Henry Abyngdon receives a Bachelor of Music at Cambridge, the first recorded musical degree

1465

- May – Henry Abyngdon is appointed Master of the Children of the Chapel Royal in London
- September – Antoine Busnois is appointed master of the choirboys at Église Saint-Hilaire-le-Grand in Poitiers

1467

- Antoine Busnois is employed at the court of Count Charles of Charolais before he becomes Duke of Burgundy

1468

- Anna Inglese and her entourage are hired by Duke Galeazzo Maria Sforza of Milan to devise and perform entertainments for his marriage to Bona of Savoy

== Compositions ==
1464

- May – Robert Morton writes the first known setting of L'homme armé

== Manuscripts ==
1460

- Wolfenbüttel Chansonnier, including compositions by Philippe Basiron

== Births ==
1468

- probable
  - William Cornysh, English composer (d. 1523)

== Deaths ==
1460

- 20 September – Gilles Binchois, Burgundian composer (b. c.1400)

1466

- date unknown
  - Nicolaus Zacharie, Italian composer (b. c.1400)
