= 1290s in art =

- 1280s
- 1290s in art
- 1300s
Other topics in 1290s:
- Music

Art timeline

The decade of the 1290s in art involved some significant events.

== Works ==
- 1291–1294: Alexander of Abingdon carves the marble tomb-chest for the bronze effigy of Queen Eleanor of Castile in Lincoln Cathedral
- 1291: A khachkar memorial stone is carved in Goshavank by Poghos
- 1291: Mosaics in the basilica San Giovanni in Laterano in Rome completed by Jacopo Torriti

== Paintings ==
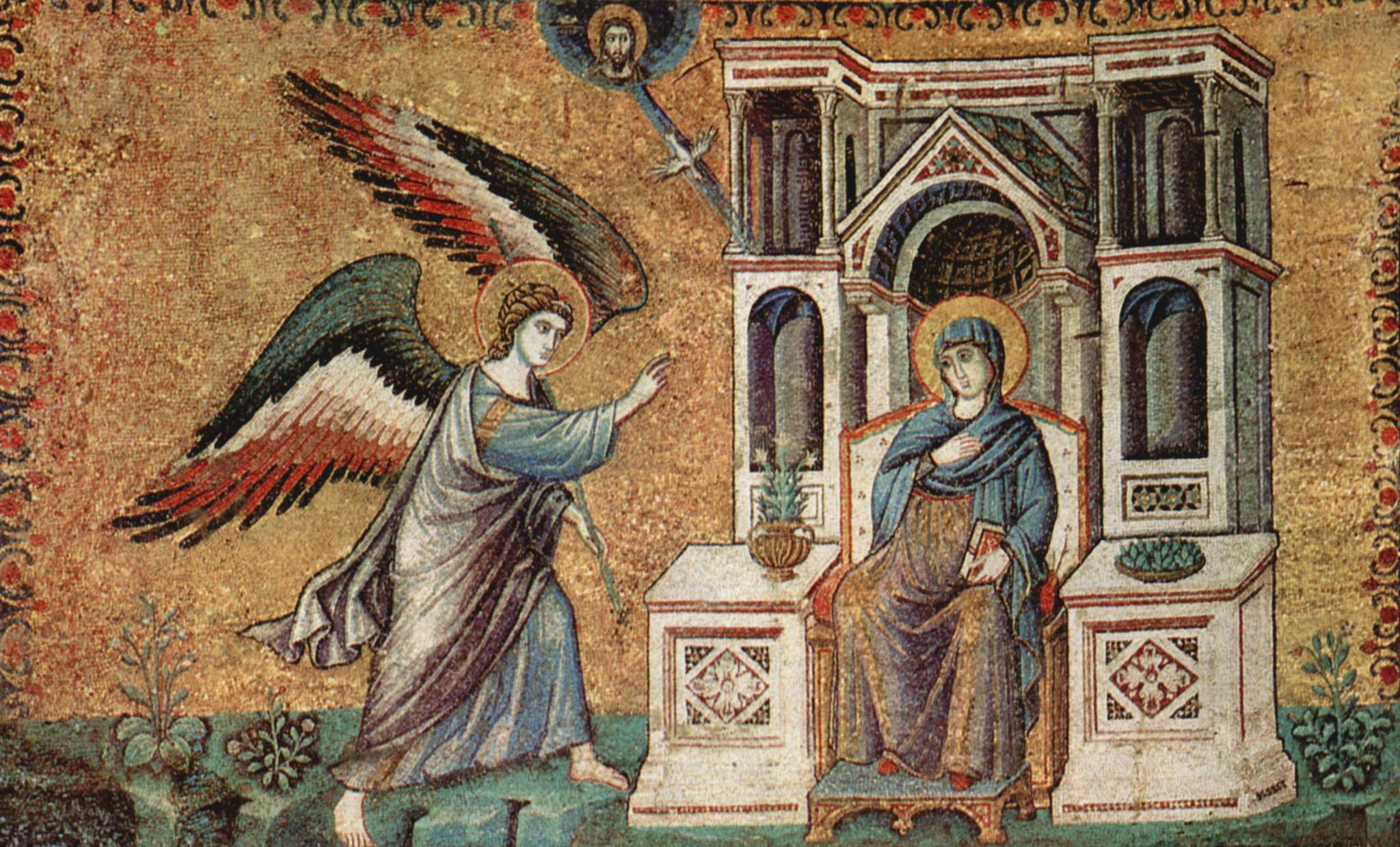
Pietro Cavallini The Annunciation, Santa Maria in Trastevere 1291

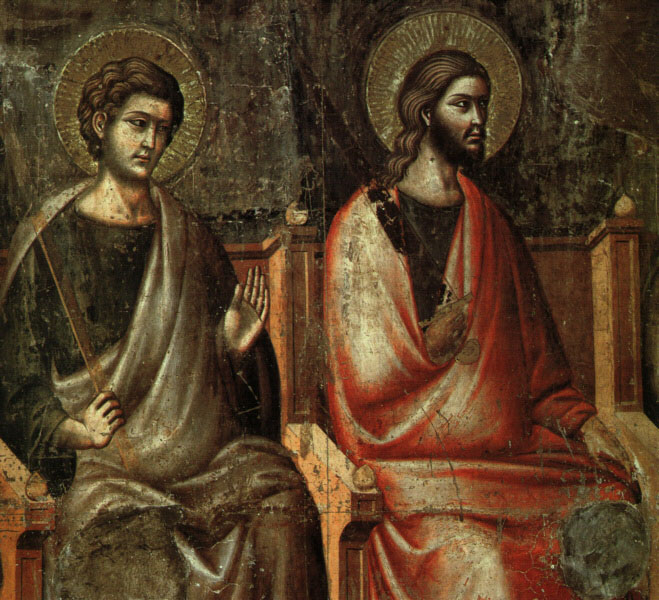
Pietro Cavallini The Last Judgement (detail of the Apostles) 1295

== Births ==
- 1297: Jacopo del Casentino – Italian fresco painter active mainly in Tuscany (died 1358)
- 1296: Yang Weizhen – Chinese painter and calligrapher (died 1370)
- 1294: Zhu Derun – Chinese painter and poet in Yuan Dynasty (died 1365)
- 1292: Evrard d'Orleans – French sculptor (died 1357)
- 1291: Lippo Memmi – Italian painter from Siena (died 1356)
- 1290: Ambrogio Lorenzetti – Italian painter of the Sienese school (died 1348)
- 1290: Andrea Pisano – Italian sculptor and architect (died 1347)
- 1290: Giovanni di Balduccio – Italian sculptor of the Medieval period (died 1339)
- 1290: Taddeo Gaddi – Italian painter and architect (died 1366)
- 1290: Ke Jiusi – Chinese landscape painter, calligrapher, and poet during the Yuan Dynasty (died 1343)

== Deaths ==
- 1298: Yaqut al-Musta'simi – calligrapher and the Turkish secretary of the last Abbasid caliph (born unknown)
- 1293: Jacopo Cosmati – Roman architect and sculptor, and worker in decorative geometric mosaic (born 1213)
