= 1350s in art =

- 1340s
- 1350s in art
- 1360s
Other topics in 1350s:
- Music

Art timeline

The decade of the 1350s in art involved some significant events.

== Events ==
- 1351: Francesco Talenti succeeds Andrea Pisano as director of the works of the Florence Cathedral
- 1352: Peter Parler becomes the master mason of Saint Vitus Cathedral

== Works ==
Huang Gongwang, Dwelling in the Fuchun Mountains, c. 1350

- c. 1350 Huang Gongwang paints Dwelling in the Fuchun Mountains
- 1352 Tommaso da Modena paints a fresco cycle of 40 Dominican scholars at their desks, in the chapter house of the convent of San Nicolò, Treviso
- c. 1359 Orcagna completes the tabernacle in Orsanmichele

== Births ==
- 1355: Melchior Broederlam – Early Netherlandish painter (died 1411)
- 1355: Jacquemart de Hesdin – French miniature painter working in the Late Gothic style (died 1414)
- 1351: Antonio Bamboccio – Italian painter and sculptor of the Gothic period (died 1421)
- 1350: Lluís Borrassà – Spanish Gothic Era painter (died 1424)
- 1350: Agnolo Gaddi – Italian painter (died 1396)
- 1350: Spinello Aretino – Italian painter of frescoes (died 1410)
- 1350: Lorenzo di Bicci – Italian painter of the Florentine school (died 1427)

== Deaths ==
- 1359: Wang Mian – Chinese painter of plums during the Yuan Dynasty (born 1287)
- 1358: Jacopo del Casentino – Italian fresco painter active mainly in Tuscany (born 1297)
- 1358: Paolo Veneziano – medieval painter from Venice (born before 1333)
- 1357: Evrard d'Orleans – French sculptor (born 1292)
- 1356: Lippo Memmi – Italian painter from Siena (born 1291)
- 1355: Cao Zhibai – Chinese painter and bibliophile from the Yuan Dynasty (born 1272)
- 1355: Jean Pucelle – Parisian Gothic-era manuscript illuminator (born 1300)
- 1354: Wu Zhen – Chinese painter during the Yuan dynasty (born 1280)
- 1350: Huáng Gōngwàng – Chinese painter from Jiangsu during the Yuan Dynasty (born 1269)
- 1350: Stefano Fiorentino – Italian fresco painter (born 1301)
- c. 1350: Maso di Banco – Italian fresco painter from Florence (born unknown)
