= 1390s in music =

List of years in music	(table)
- … 1380; 1381; 1382; 1383; 1384; 1385; 1386; 1387; 1388; 1389; 1390; 1391; 1392; 1393; 1394; 1395; 1396; 1397; 1398; 1399; 1400 …
- In art 1387 1388 1389 1390 1391 1392 1393
- Art; Archaeology; Architecture; Literature; Music; Philosophy; Science; +...

- 1380s
- 1390s in music
Other topics in 1390s:
- Art

== Events ==
This is a list of notable events in music that took place in the 1390s.

- 1390
  - The monastery at Durham appoints John Stele to teach the Benedictine monks and eight secular boys to play the organs and to sing "triple song" (possibly faburden).
- 1391
  - 1 February – Antonio Zacara da Teramo, a singer in the papal chapel, is appointed "scriptor litterarum apostolicarum" (papal secretary) by Pope Boniface IX.
  - exact dates unknown
    - The band of the Worshipful Company of Goldsmiths, London, purchases new trumpets, clarions, shawms, a bombard, and a bagpipe.
    - Johannes Tapissier travels to Milan and Avignon in the entourage of Philip the Bold, Duke of Burgundy.
- 1392
  - 25 November – Eustache Deschamps completes L’Art de dictier et de fere chancons, balades, virelais et rondeaulx.
  - exact date unknown – A group of merchants in Birmingham establish the Gild of the Holy Cross, which appointed priests to sing at the parish church, St Martin in the Bull Ring, as well as an organist whom they housed near to the church.
- 1393
  - exact date unknown – The French singer and composer Bosquet (Johannes de Bosco, Jean du Bois) receives a papal grant as a musician to Duke Louis II of Anjou.
- 1394
  - early in the year – The canons of Notre-Dame de Paris successfully solicit 200 francs from Charles VI for rebuilding the cathedral organ, after the original had fallen into disrepair.
- 1395
  - exact date unknown – Johannes Tapissier makes a second visit to Avignon in the entourage of Philip the Bold.
- 1397
  - exact date unknown – Earliest reference to a clavecembalum (in this case meaning a clavichord), in a letter from a Paduan lawyer Lambertacci, attributing its invention to Magister Armanus de Alemania.
- 1399
  - exact date unknown – Johannes Tapissier visits Flanders in the entourage of Philip the Bold.

== Works ==
- c. 1390–95. Jacob Senleches – La harpe de melodie
- 1399
  - May or June – Johannes Ciconia, Una panthera in compagnia de Marte madrigal for three voices, written for the diplomatic visit by Lazzaro Guinigi of Lucca to Gian Galeazzo Visconti in Pavia .

== Births ==
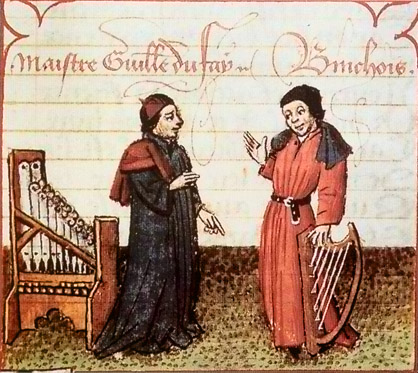
Guillaume Dufay (left), with Gilles Binchois, circa 1440s

- August 5, c. 1397 – Guillaume Dufay, Franco-Flemish composer (died November 27, 1474)

== Deaths ==
- 1391
  - After June 10 – Matheus de Sancto Johanne, French composer
- 1397
  - September 2 – Francesco Landini, Italian composer, poet, organist, singer and instrument maker (born c.1325)
