= Treaty of Canterbury =

Treaty of Canterbury can refer to:

- Treaty of Canterbury (1416), a diplomatic agreement between Sigismund, Holy Roman Emperor, and Henry V of England for an alliance against France.
- Treaty of Canterbury (1986), the original document providing for the Channel Tunnel between the United Kingdom and France.
