= 1300s in music =

- 1290s
- 1300s in music
- 1310s
Other topics in 1300s:
- Art

Music timeline

The 1300s in music was a decade involving some events.

== Events ==
- 1303 – an official regulation issued in Bremen restricted the number of musicians allowed to play at weddings to eight.
- 1306
  - 22 May – Edward I of England holds the Feast of the Swans at Westminster Abbey, knighting his son Edward of Caernarfon, who in turn knighted 266 others. Music for the banquet following the ceremony involved over 150 minstrels, which cost Edward I the huge sum of £130, more than three times the minimum annual income for a knighthood. The French musician Adam de la Halle is identified among these minstrels, along with twenty-six harpists, thirteen fiddlers (including Tomasin, the Prince of Wales's own fiddler, Nicholas de Caumbray, vidulator to Philip IV of France, and the Englishman Le Roy Druet, called "King of the Minstrels"), three gigatores (rebec players) from Germany, two players of the psaltery, and one each of the citole and gittern.
- 1309 – Marchetto da Padova begins work on his music-theory treatise, Lucidarium in arte musice plane, which he would only complete nine years later.
  - exact date unknown – an organ is installed in the Church of St Pierre in Lille.

== Births ==
- 1304 – Lodewijk Heyligen, Franco-Flemish music theorist (d. 1361)
