= 1280s in art =

- 1270s
- 1280s in art
- 1290s
Other topics in 1280s:
- Music

Art timeline

The decade of the 1280s in art involved some significant events.

== Paintings ==
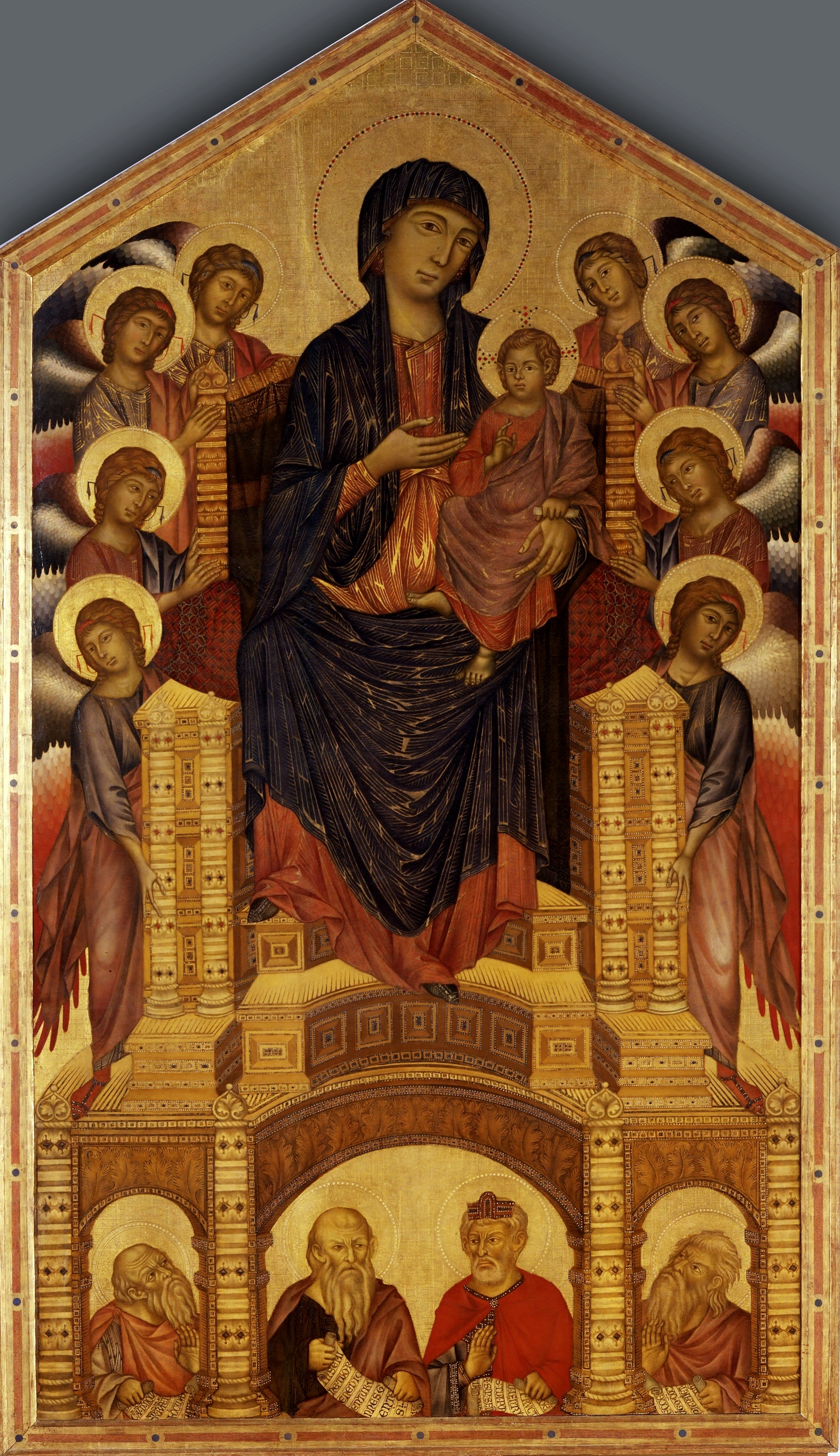
Cimabue Maestà, 1280–1285, Uffizi Gallery, Florence

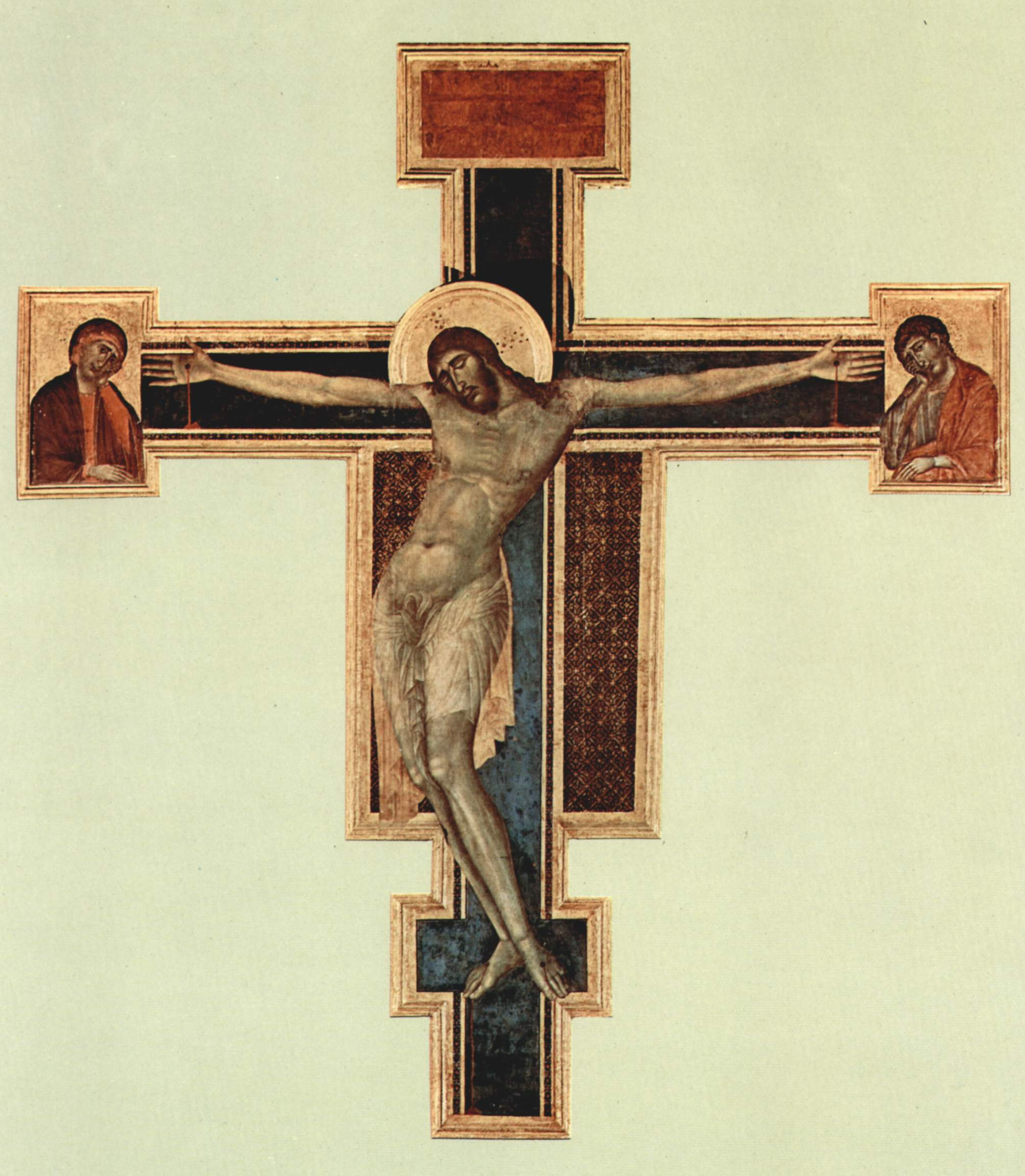
Cimabue Crucifix, 1287–1288, Panel, 448 x 390 cm
Basilica di Santa Croce, Florence.
- 1285: Duccio paints Rucellai Madonna for Santa Maria Novella (now in the Uffizi)

== Births ==
- 1289: Zhao Yong – Chinese painter in Yuan dynasty (died c. 1360)
- 1289: Gu An – Chinese painter in Yuan dynasty (died 1365)
- 1287: Tang Di – Chinese landscape painter during the Yuan dynasty (died 1368)
- 1287: Wang Mian – Chinese painter of plums during the Yuan dynasty (died 1359)
- 1284: Simone Martini – Italian painter born in Siena (died 1344)
- 1282: Li Shixing – Chinese landscape painter during the Yuan dynasty (died 1328)
- 1280: Pietro Lorenzetti – Italian painter (died 1348)
- 1280: Tino di Camaino – Italian sculptor (died 1337)
- 1280: Bernardo Daddi – early Italian renaissance painter and apprentice of Giotto (died 1348)
- 1280: Wu Zhen – Chinese painter during the Yuan dynasty (died 1354)
- 1280: Ugolino di Nerio – Italian painter most active in Siena (died 1349)

== Deaths ==
- 1285: Robert of Beverley – British mason and sculptor (born unknown)
- 1284: Nicola Pisano – Italian sculptor whose work is noted for its classical Roman sculptural style (born 1220/1225)
