= 1340s in art =

- 1330s
- 1340s in art
- 1350s
Other topics in 1340s:
- Music

Art timeline

The decade of the 1340s in art involved some significant events.

== Paintings ==
- 1342: Simone Martini – Christ Discovered in the Temple
- 1345: Ni Zan – Six Gentlemen
- 1348: Bernardo Daddi – Altarpiece of church of San Giorgio a Ruballa, Tuscany
- 1349: Zhu Derun – Primordial Chaos

== Objects ==
- 1347: Église Notre-Dame de l'Assomption, Bergheim completed
- 1348: Gyeongcheonsa Pagoda

== Gallery ==
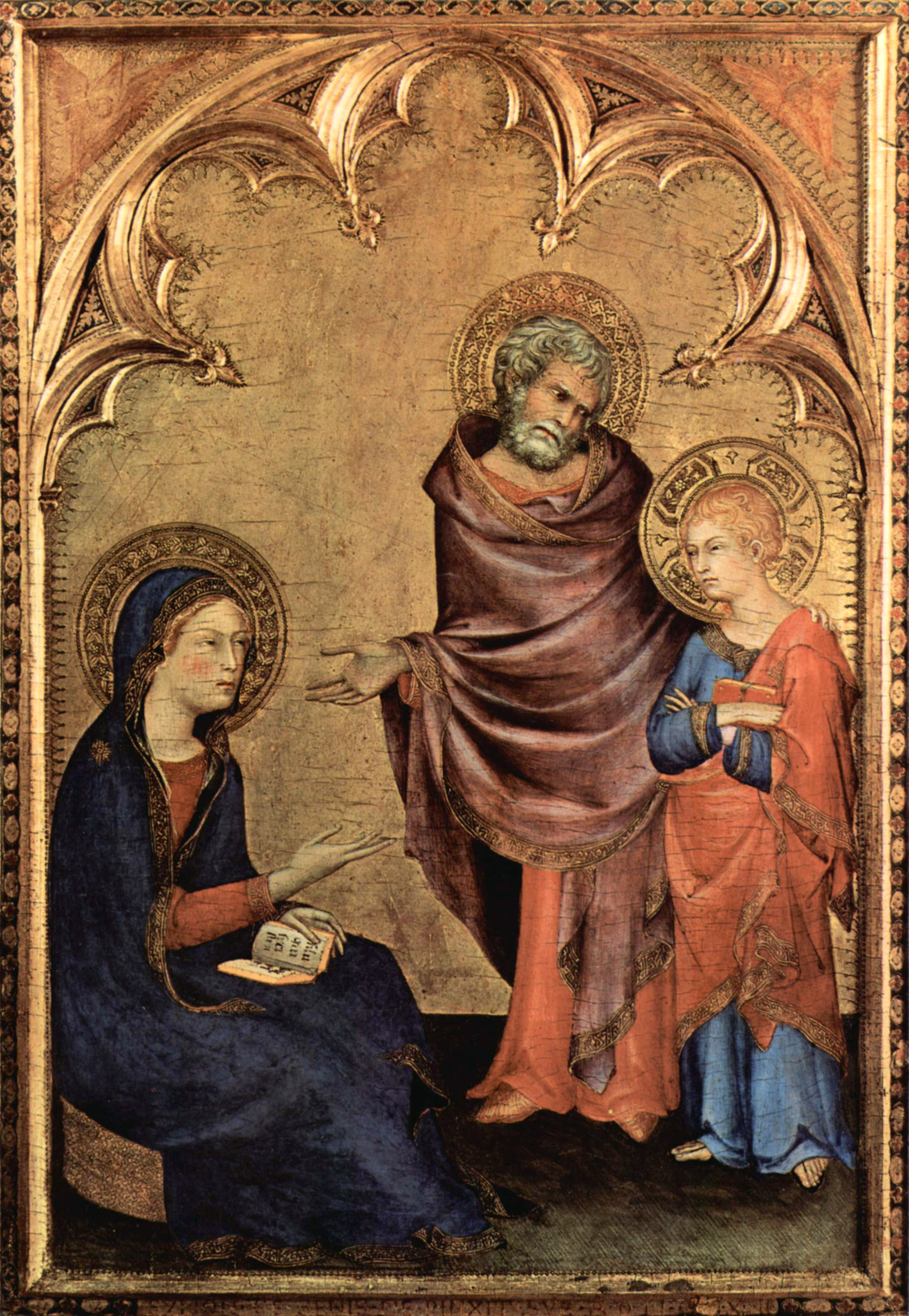
Simone Martini, Christ Discovered in the Temple, 1342

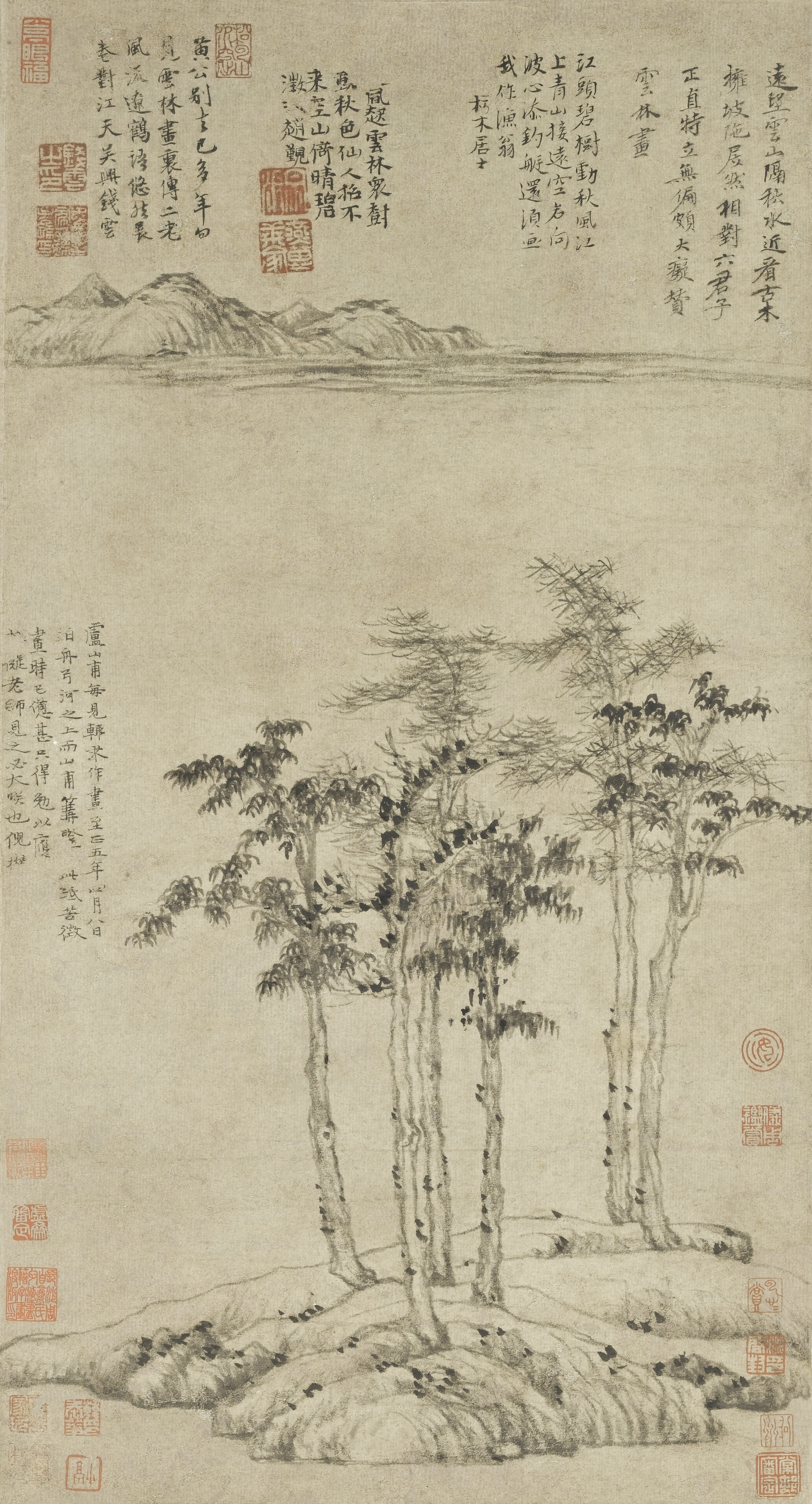
Ni Zan, Six Gentlemen, 1345

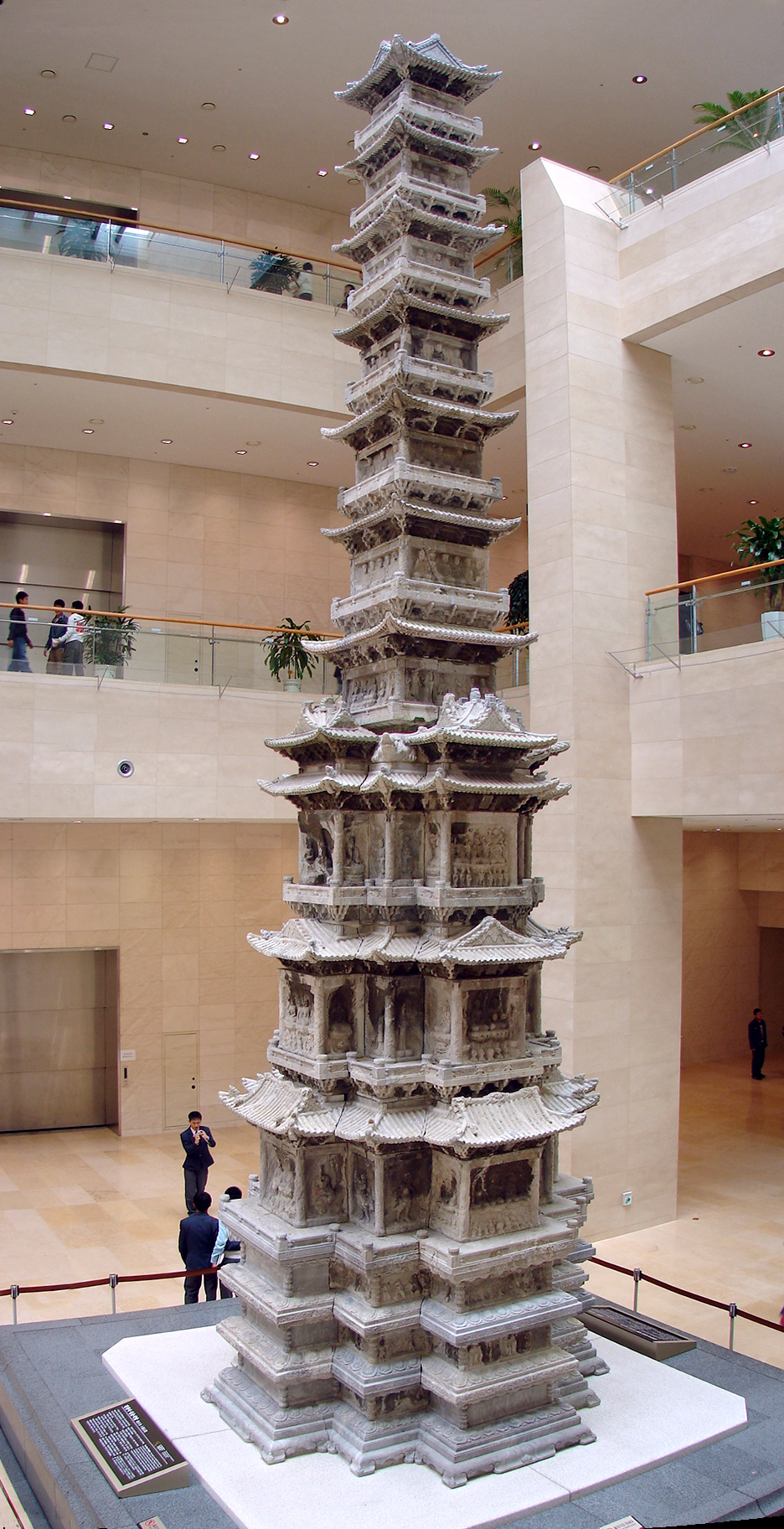
Gyeongcheonsa Pagoda, 1348

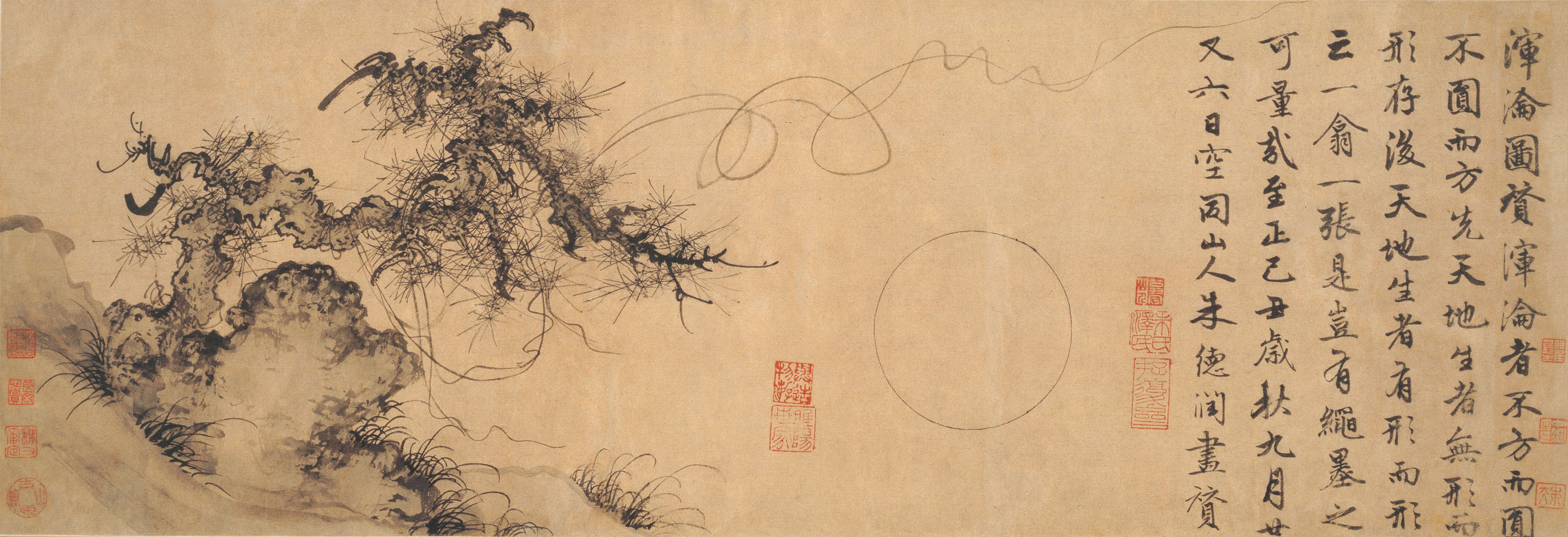
Zhu Derun, Primordial Chaos, 1349

== Births ==
- c. 1345: Paolo di Giovanni Fei – Italian painter of the Sienese School (died 1411)
- 1340: Theophanes the Greek – Byzantine Greek artist, one of the greatest icon painters, or iconographers, of Muscovite Russia (died 1410)
- c. 1340: Niccolò di Pietro Gerini – Italian painter of the late Gothic period (died 1414)
- 1340: Claus Sluter – Dutch sculptor (died 1405 or 1406)

== Deaths ==
- 1349: Ugolino di Nerio – Italian painter most active in Siena (born 1280)
- 1348: Ambrogio Lorenzetti – Italian painter of the Sienese school. plague (born 1290)
- 1348: Pietro Lorenzetti – Italian painter, plague (born 1280)
- 1348: Bernardo Daddi – Italian painter, apprentice of Giotto, plague (born 1280)
- 1347: Andrea Pisano – Italian sculptor and architect (born 1290)
- 1344: Simone Martini – Italian painter born in Siena (born 1284)
- 1343: Ke Jiusi – Chinese landscape painter, calligrapher and poet during the Yuan dynasty (born 1290)
