= 1380s in music =

List of years in music	(table)
- … 1370; 1371; 1372; 1373; 1374; 1375; 1376; 1377; 1378; 1379; 1380; 1381; 1382; 1383; 1384; 1385; 1386; 1387; 1388; 1389; 1390 …
- In art 1377 1378 1379 1380 1381 1382 1383
- Art; Archaeology; Architecture; Literature; Music; Philosophy; Science; +...

- 1370s
- 1380s in music
- 1390s
Other topics in 1380s:
- Art

The 1380s in music involved some significant events.

== Events ==
- 1381
  - Three harp makers are documented as active in Oxford.
  - Matteo da Perugia receives the degree of Doctor in Theology in Paris.
- 1382 – Earliest mention of the Sint Lucasgilde in Antwerp, a guild of harpsichord builders, painters, gilders, carvers, printers, cabinet makers, and other specialist crafts.
- 1383
  - 21 August – A treasury document from the court of Navarre states that Jacob Senleches has entered the service of Pedro de Luna, Cardinal of Aragon, as a harpist.
- 1384
  - 10 January – Baude Fresnel, a harpist and organist probably identical with the composer Baude Cordier, enters the service of Philip the Bold, Duke of Burgundy, as the Duke's private harpist.
  - A new organ is installed in St. Peter's Church (Munich).
  - The organ built by Claus Karlen in 1324–27 for the Strasbourg Cathedral is destroyed by fire; it is replaced the following year.
- 1387
  - Andrea da Firenze is commissioned to build an organ for the Florence Cathedral.
  - A new city charter for Vilnius in the Grand Duchy of Lithuania leads to the establishment of musicians' guilds there.
- 1388 – first known use of the English word "recorder" to refer to the musical instrument, in a document from the household accounts of the Earl of Derby (later Henry IV of England): "i. fistula nomine Recordour mpta London pro domino".

== Bands formed ==
- 1384
  - Spring – Philip the Bold founds the Burgundian ducal chapel of sixteen singers. Eight of the new singers were acquired from the household of the recently deceased Louis II, Count of Flanders, and the other eight from the papal court at Avignon.
  - A reorganization of the Florentine municipal band added two new groups: (1) a trumpet ensemble of six trombetti, eight trombadori plus one or two percussionists, and (2) an alta capella of three pifferi (shawm players).
- 1386
  - William I, Margrave of Meissen employs fistulatores (pipers), vigellatores (fiddlers), and tympanatores (drummers) at his court for the first time.
  - The Stadtmusikanten (town musicians) of Osnabrück are established.

== Compositions ==
- 1382
  - September – Jacob de Senleches, Fuions de ci (ballade), with text referring to the recent death of Eleanor of Aragon, Queen of Castile.
- 1388 or 1389 – Trebor, En seumeillant m'avint une vision (ballade).
- 1389
  - May
    - Anon., Cine vermeil, cine de très haut pris (ballade) for three voices, composed in connection with the wedding on 6 June (Julian) of Jehan, duc de Berry and Jeanne de Boulogne.
    - Egidius, Roses et lis ay veu en une fleur (ballade), possibly composed for the wedding on 6 June of Jehan, duc de Berry and Jeanne de Boulogne.
    - Solage
      - S'aincy estoit (ballade) for three voices, composed for the wedding on 6 June of Jehan, duc de Berry and Jeanne de Boulogne
      - Corps femenin par vertu de nature (ballade) for three voices, written shortly before 6 June
      - Calextone qui fut dame (ballade) for three voices, written shortly after 6 June
    - Trebor, Passerose de beaute, la noble flour (ballade) for three voices, possibly also written for the wedding of Jehan de Berry and Jeanne de Boulogne.

== Births ==
- 1389 or 1390 – Thomas Damett, English composer (d. between 15 July 1436 and 14 April 1437)
