= Senile (disambiguation) =

Senile is an outdated term for people with dementia.

Senile may also refer to:

- "Senile" (Lil Wayne song), a track on the 2014 compilation album Young Money: Rise of an Empire
- Seniles, a collection of letters by Petrarch
