= 1380s in art =

- 1370s
- 1380s in art
- 1390s
Other topics in 1380s:
- Music

Art timeline

The decade of the 1380s in art involved some significant events.

== Events ==
- c.1380: Chinese painter Wang Meng is erroneously accused of conspiring against the Hongwu Emperor and spends the remaining five years of his life in jail.
- 1388: Publication in early Ming dynasty China of the Ko Ku Yao Lun ("The Essential Criteria of Antiquities").

== Works ==
- c. 1380s: Agnolo Gaddi works on painting The Coronation of the Virgin, The Finding of the True Cross and Madonna Enthroned with Saints and Angels
- 1381: Jaume Serra completes Descent into Hell
- c. 1383: Master Bertram of Minden paints the Grabow Altarpiece
- 1381–5: Hermann von Münster produces for Metz Cathedral in the Duchy of Lorraine the stained glass tympanum of the west façade and the rose window
- 1389: Hermann Ruissel crafts the Three Brothers (jewel)

== Births ==
- 1388: Xia Chang – Chinese painter during the Ming Dynasty (died 1470)
- 1388: Dai Jin – founder of the Zhe School of Ming dynasty painting (died 1462)
- 1385: Johan Limbourg – Dutch Renaissance miniature painter (died 1416)
- 1387: Parri Spinelli – Italian (Tuscan) painter of the early renaissance (died 1453)
- 1386: Donatello – early Renaissance Italian artist and sculptor from Florence (died 1466)
- 1386: Paul Limbourg – Dutch Renaissance miniature painter (died 1416)
- 1385: Herman Limbourg – Dutch Renaissance miniature painter (died 1416)
- 1385: Michelino Molinari da Besozzo – Italian painter (died 1445)
- 1384: Nanni di Banco – Italian sculptor from Florence (died 1421)
- 1383: Masolino da Panicale – Italian painter (died 1447)
- 1380: Hans von Tübingen – Austrian artist (died 1462)

== Deaths ==
- 1389: Luca di Tommè – Italian tempera painter (born 1330)
- 1385: Wáng Méng – Chinese painter during the Yuan dynasty (born 1308)
- 1381: Jean de Liège – French sculptor (born 1330)
- 1380: Jacopo del Casentino – Italian painter active mainly in Tuscany (born 1330)
