= Epistolae familiares =

Letter collection of Petrarch

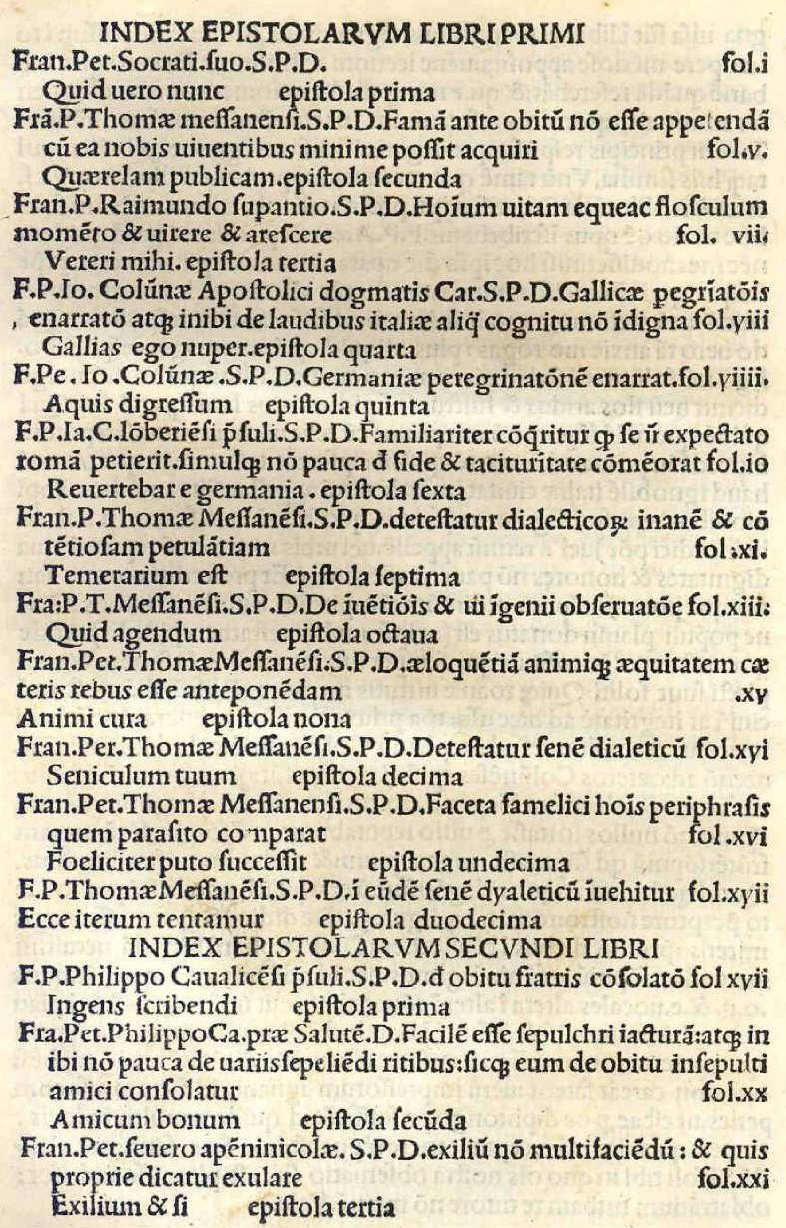
Epistolae familiares and Seniles Venice: J. and G. de Gregorius, 1492

Epistolae familiares is the title of a collection of letters from the scholar Petrarch, edited during his lifetime. The collection was originally named Epistolarum mearum ad diversos liber ("a book of my letters to different people"), but was later shortened to the current title.

== Background ==
Petrarch discovered Cicero's letters in 1345, giving him the idea to collect his own set of letters. It wasn't until four or five years later that he got started. He collected his letter correspondence in two different time periods, referred to as Epistolae familiares and Seniles.

Epistolae familiares (a.k.a. Familiar Letters) was largely collected during his stay in Provence from 1351 to 1353. However, it was not ultimately completed until 1359 when he was in Milan. Petrarch copied his collection of letters onto parchment in 1359, using a certain ingeniosus homo et amicus, with another complete copy done in 1364. He added letters in 1366, bringing his first collection of letters to 350. He broke these down and sorted them into 24 volumes. This first collection of letters, called Epistolae familiares, was written between the years 1325 and 1366 (the first translation into English was done by historian James Harvey Robinson in 1898 in his book The First Modern Scholar and Man of Letters).

In January 1350, Petrarch wrote a lengthy letter to his dear friend ("Socrates" as Petrarch liked to call him), dedicating the collection to him. He requests his friend to keep the letters safely out of sight of the censors and critics. It has since been discovered that Socrates was the Flemish Benedictine monk and music theorist Lodewijk Heyligen, whose acquaintance Petrarch had made in the circle of Cardinal Giovanni Colonna in Avignon.

== Seniles ==
Petrarch began a second collection of letters in 1361, also known as Letters of Old Age, containing 128 letters written between 1361 and 1373. It is also broken down and sorted into volumes (18 books). The final letter, the first and only of the 18th book, is his incomplete Letter to Posterity. Some English translations of this collection of letters that are out of copyright are available here A complete English translation is also available in two volumes from Italica Press, translated by Aldo S. Bernardo, formerly Distinguished Professor Emeritus of Italian and Comparative Literature, State University of New York at Binghamton.

== Letters of interest ==
- Letter to Posterity
- Ascent of Mont Ventoux
- Letter VI.2 to Fra Giovanni Colonna

== Litterae Variae ==
There are many letters that Petrarch lost or did not keep a copy of. Others, he destroyed the originals for fear they would bring much criticism to his larger collection. There is a collection of 59 of these letters by Giuseppe Fracassetti.

== Sine Nomine ==
This special set (Book Without A Name) of letters Petrarch was too fond of to let out of his hands of some nineteen letters was kept out of the main body of Familiar Letters to give respect to the papacy and the controversial lavish lifestyle practiced at Avignon. Liber sine nomine is an epitome of this same work in one volume without a title (which is 19 letters).

== English translations ==
- Francesco Petrarch, Letters on Familiar Matters (Rerum familiarium libri), translated by Aldo S. Bernardo (New York: Italica Press, 2005). Volume 1, Books 1-8; Volume 2, Books 9-16; Volume 3, Books 17-24.
- Francesco Petrarch, Letters of Old Age (Rerum senilium libri), translated by Aldo S. Bernardo, Saul Levin & Reta A. Bernardo (New York: Italica Press, 2005). Volume 1, Books 1-9; Volume 2, Books 10-18.
