= 3rd millennium BC in music =

3rd millennium BC in music - 2nd millennium BC in music - 1st millennium BC in music

== Events ==
- c. 3000 BC - The invention of the castanets in Early Dynastic Egypt.
- c. 2800 BC – The invention of the clapper, a basic form of percussion instrument, in Early Dynastic Egypt.
- c. 2800 BC - The invention of the harp and the lyre in Mesopotamia.
- c. 2686-2181 BC - The invention of the Sistrum, a musical instrument of the percussion family.
- c. 2600 BC – The creation of Standard of Ur which includes soundbox of a musical instrument
- c. 2550–2450 BC – The invention of the Bull Headed Lyre of Ur, string instrument used in Mesopotamia.
- c. 2550–2450 BC – The invention of the Lyres of Ur, a stringed musical instrument from the Early Dynastic III Period of Mesopotamia.
- c. 2500 BC - Around ninety royal servants—including soldiers, grooms, and female musicians—were buried alive in the tomb of a royal couple in Ur.
- c. 2500 BC - The invention of thin lyres in northern Syria.
- c. 2500 BC – The invention of thick lyres in Uruk and Susa.
- c. 2300 BC – The earliest known composer is born, Enheduanna, priestess of the moon god Nanna (Sīn).
- c. 2200 BC – A song was composed during the Old Kingdom of Egypt and subsequently buried in a tomb.

== See also ==
- Timeline of musical events
