= 1410s in music =

- 1410s in music
Other topics in 1410s:
- Art

Music timeline

This is a list of notable events in music that took place in the 1410s.

== Events ==
1410

- 3 April – Henry V is crowned King of England, and appoints Robert Gilbert Dean of the Chapel Royal.

1412

- Antonio Zacara da Teramo is recorded as a singer in the chapel of Antipope John XXIII in Bologna.

1413

- Richard Loqueville begins teaching music at Cambrai Cathedral. He is thought to have taught Guillaume Du Fay there.

1414

- Matteo da Perugia returns from a stay of several years in Pisa, to work at Milan Cathedral.

1415

- Ugolino of Forlì becomes a canon at Forlì.

== Compositions ==
1412

- Antonio da Cividale – "Strenua/Gaudeat"

== Publications ==
1413

- Xinkan Taiyin Daquan

== Births ==
1410

- probable
  - Johannes Ockeghem, Flemish composer (d. 1497)
  - Conrad Paumann, blind German organist, lutenist and composer (d. 1473)
  - John Plummer, English composer (d. c.1483)

1415

- probable
  - Johannes Fedé, French composer (d. c.1477)

1418

- probable
  - Henry Abyngdon, English singer, organist and composer (d. 1497)

== Deaths ==
1411

- December – Johannes Ciconia, Flemish composer and music theorist (b. c.1370)

1415

- date unknown – Andrea da Firenze, organist and composer

1416

- date unknown – Matteo da Perugia, magister cappellae of Milan Cathedral

1417

- date unknown – Johannes Cesaris, French composer active at the Burgundian court

1418

- date unknown – Richard Loqueville, French harpist and composer

1419

- probable – John Cook(e), English composer
