= 1350s in music =

- 1340s
- 1350s in music
- 1360s
Other topics in 1350s:
- Art

Music timeline

The 1350s in music involved some significant events.

== Events ==
- 1353 – Ibn Battuta visits the Mali Empire and writes an account of his journey that includes descriptions of the music he heard there, and of several instruments including the ngoni and balafon (a type of xylophone).

== Compositions ==
- 1356 – Following the Battle of Crécy, Guillaume de Machaut composes his Lai 24, En demantant et lamentant, lamenting the capture by Edward, the Black Prince of King Jean II and his son Philippe.
