= Cao Zhibai =

Chinese painter and bibliophile

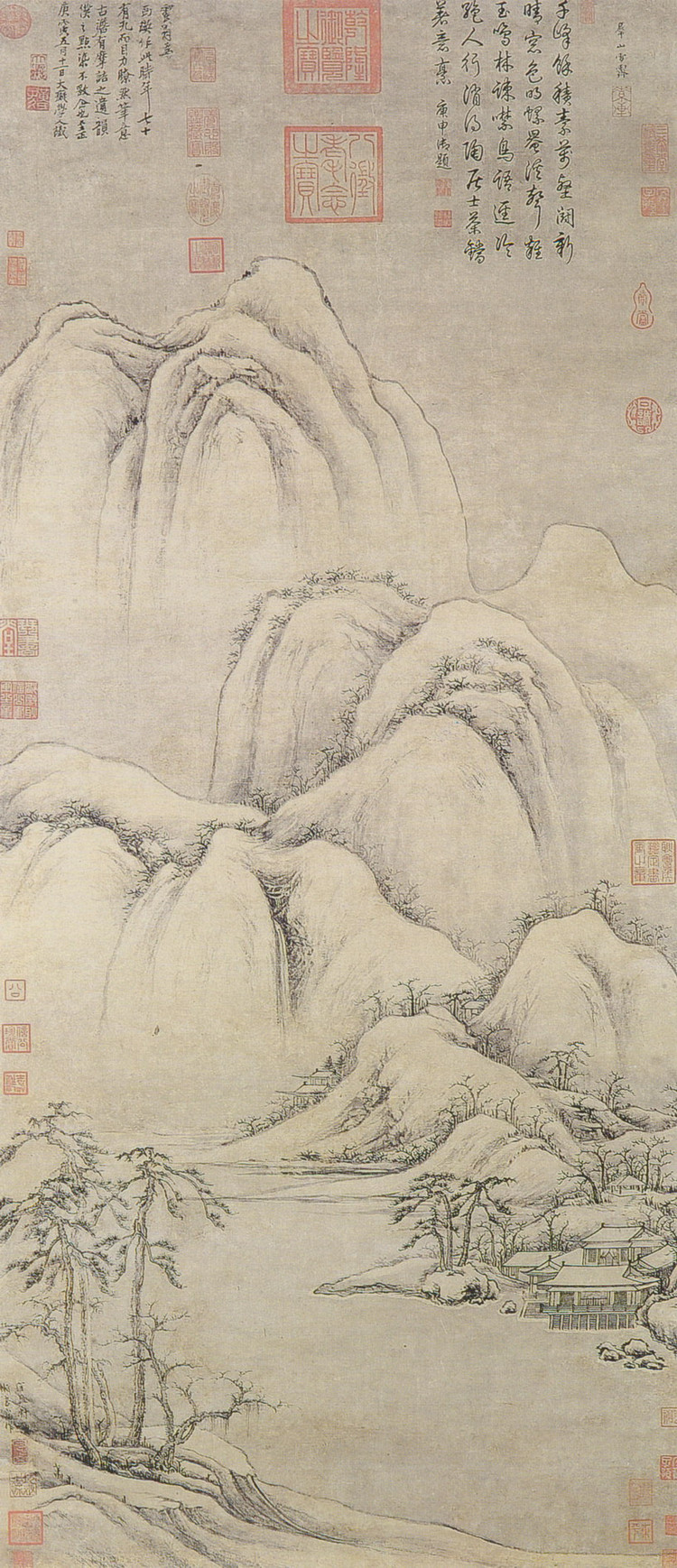
Cao Zhibai, Clearing Snow on Mountain Peaks, National Palace Museum

Cao Zhibai (Chinese: 曹知白; pinyin: Cáo Zhībái; Wade–Giles: Ts'ao Chih-pai; 1271–1355) was a renowned Chinese painter and bibliophile from the Yuan Dynasty. His courtesy name was Youxuan (又玄) or Zhensu (真素), and sobriquet Yunxi (云西). His painting style was similar to that of Zhao Mengfu, who helped revitalize the Li-Guo landscape painting style in the Yuan period.
