= Hermann von Münster =

German glass artist

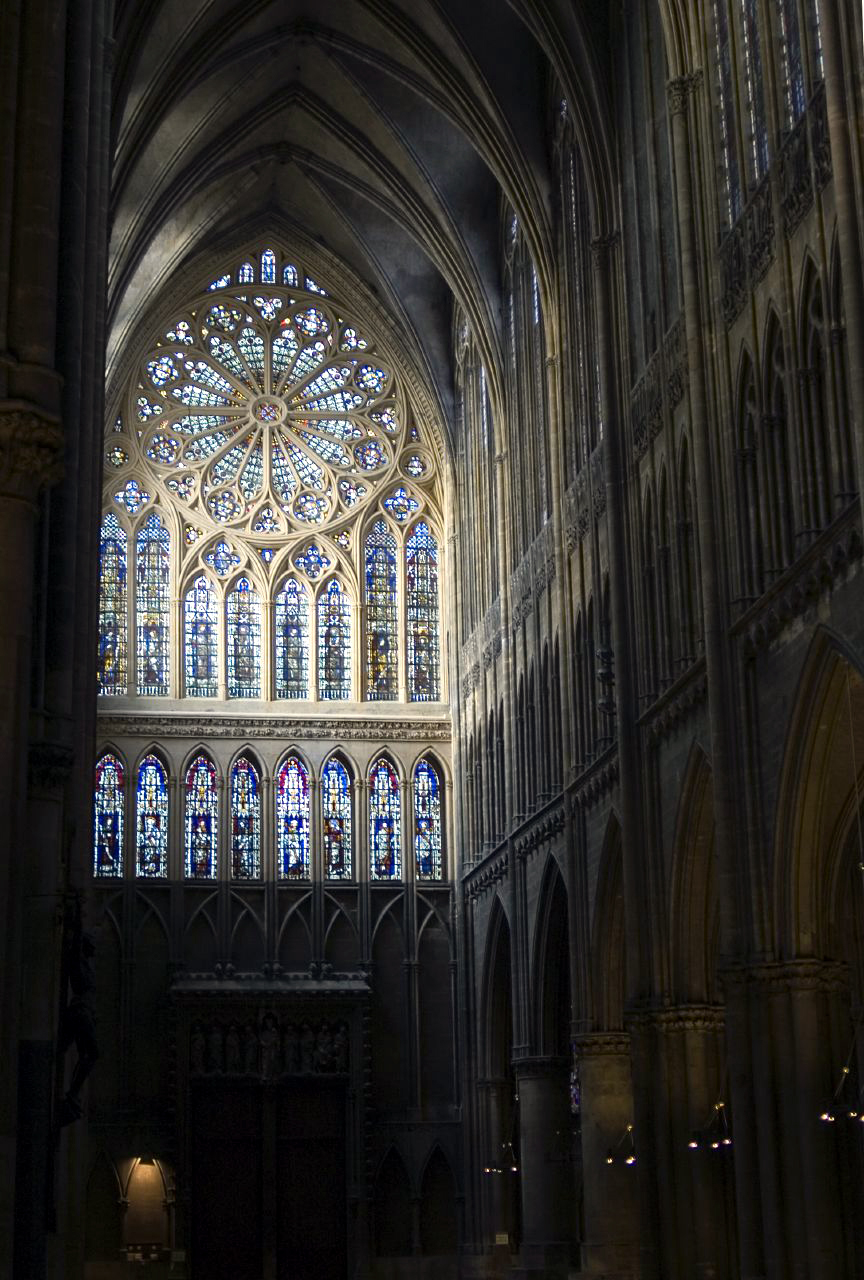
Western rose window (14th century), Metz cathedral

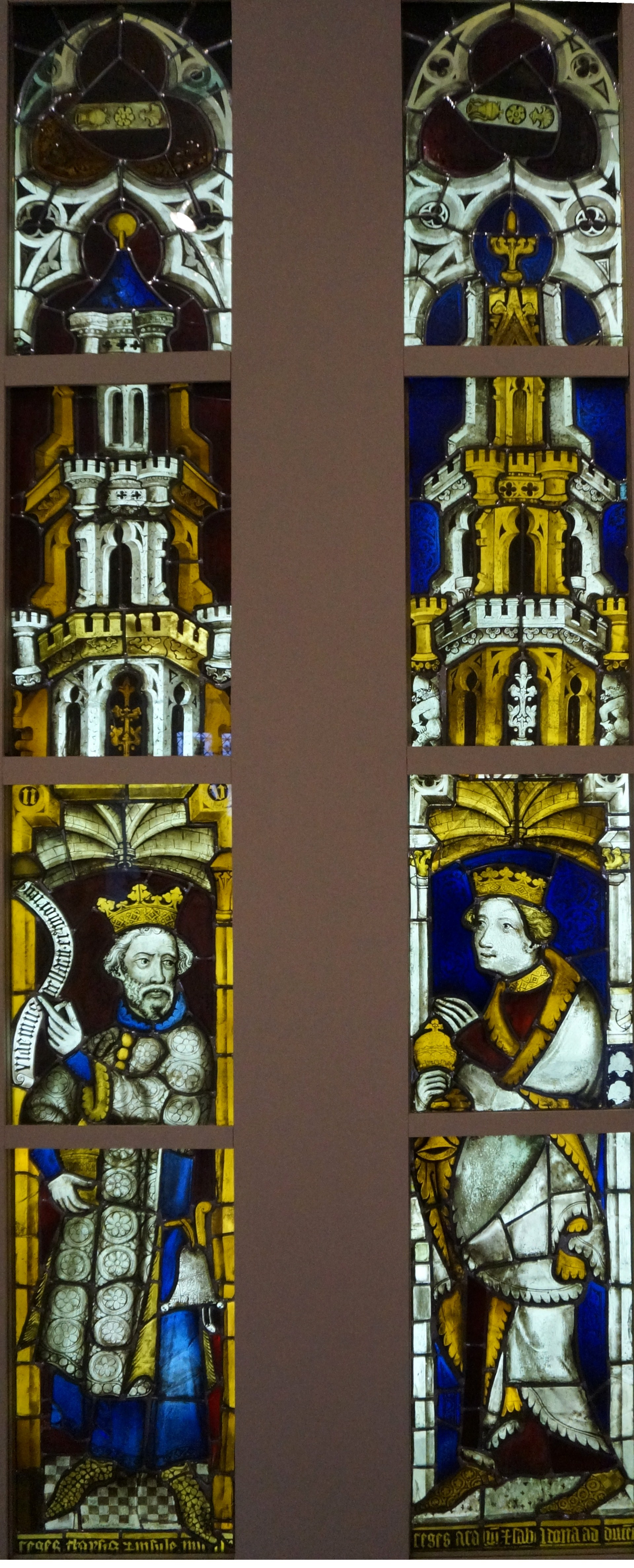
Windows by Hermann von Münster

Hermann von Münster (c. 1330 – March 1392) was a German master glassmaker, native of Münster, in Westphalia, and active in Lorraine.

== Biography ==
Hermman von Münster is actually the first stained glass artist to be mentioned by the archives of the Cathedral chapter of Saint-Etienne of Metz. On August 29, 1381, master Hermann received an annuity of 22 pounds, to pay for its work on the western large window of the cathedral of Metz. His work was supported by Cardinal William Aigrefeuille, legate of the antipope Clement VII, who then reorganized the Chapter of Metz. Three years later, on 2 May 1384, the Cathedral chapter negotiated the price of the "GRANT OZ", the western Rose window with Hermann von Munster. Hermann was still working on the windows of the western facade in December 1384. In August 1385, the Cathedral Chapter borrowed 420 pounds to set the work completed.

In 1388, Hermann bought a home in Metz, beside the cathedral, where he died in March 1392. Thanks to his fame and to the excellent quality of his work, Hermann was buried in the aisle of the cathedral. An epitaph on the north wall of the cathedral indicates in old French:

CI DEVANT GIST
MAISTRE HARMAN LI VALRIER
DE MUNSTERE AN WAILTEFALLE,
ET FIST LE GRANT OZ DE CEANS,
QUI MORUT LE JOR DE LA NOSTRE DAME
EN MARS M.CCC.IIIIXX et XII.

The only information known about Herman von Münster concerns of the cathedral of Metz, in particular the large western window of the nave of Metz.

== Technical overview ==
To assemble the window, pieces of colored and painted glass were first laid out on the design board, with the edges of each piece fitted into H-shaped strips of lead. Then, these cames were soldered to one another. When a panel was completed, putty was inserted between the glass and the lead cames for waterproofing. The entire composition was then stabilized with an iron armature and mounted in the window.

== Stylistic influences ==
It seems that the style of Herman von Münster is to link to the Westphalian context. His work is close in style to the work of the master of Altenberg, near Münster. But the figures of the master of Altenberg are less expressive, and stricter. The characters in the bottom of the western windows of Metz, richly dressed, stand under colourful architectural niches. The use of thicker glass, with more sustained tones than in France, far from being an archaism, testifies of the influence that the medieval Rhenish style had on his work.

== Sources ==
- Abbé Foedit, Etwas vom Metzer Dom. Das große Radfenster der Westfront, Metz, 1905.

== See also ==
- Metz Cathedral
