= Yang Weizhen =

Chinese painter and calligrapher

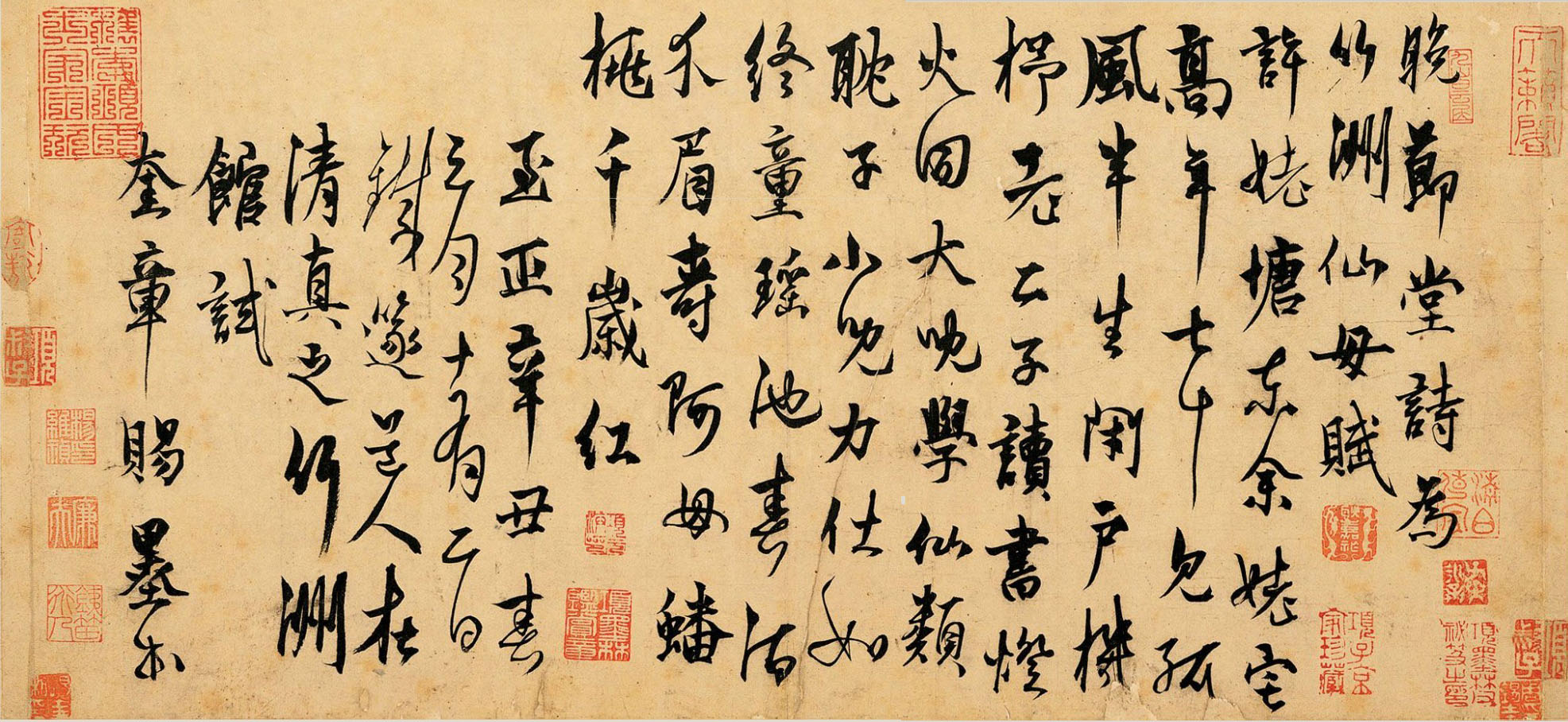
Poem Ode on the Wanjie Hall (晚节堂诗札) written by Yang Weizhen

Yang Weizhen (simplified Chinese: 杨维桢; traditional Chinese: 楊維楨; pinyin: Yáng Wéizhēn; Wade–Giles: Yang^{2} Wei^{2}-chen^{1}; c. 1296 – 1370) was a Chinese painter, calligrapher and poet during the Yuan Dynasty (1271–1368).

Yang was born in the Zhejiang province. His style name was 'Lianfu' and his sobriquet was 'Tieya'. Yang's reputation for calligraphy was well known, incorporating a purity and strength into his works.
