= Hermann Ruissel =

14th-century Parisian goldsmith

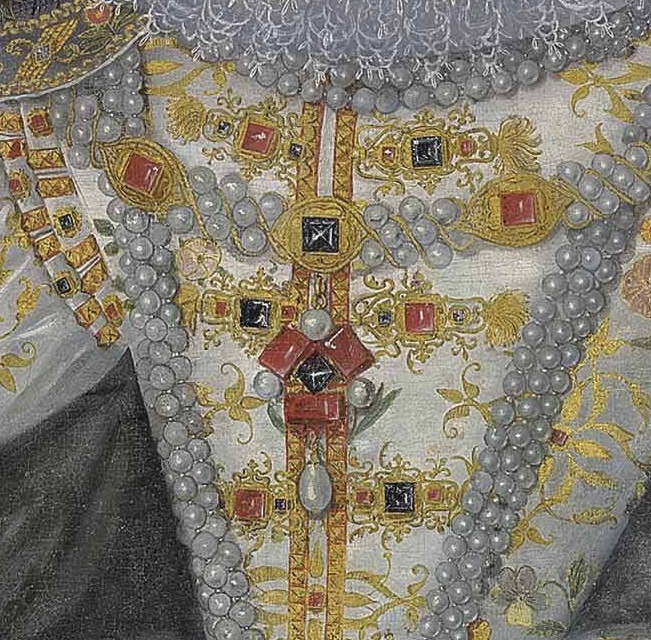
Detail of painting showing Queen Elizabeth I wearing Ruissel's most famous piece, the Three Brothers

Hermann Ruissel or Herman Ruissel (c. 1360 - c. 1420) was a medieval Parisian goldsmith who crafted jewelry for the King of France and other persons of high rank.

From 1385 to 1389 Ruissel crafted jewellery mainly for Philip the Bold.After 1389 he also executed works for Charles VI of France and his brother Louis I, Duke of Orléans and Louis's wife Valentina Visconti, Duchess of Orléans. From 1390, he held the court title of Valet de chambre to Charles VI.

Among Ruissel's early works is the Three Brothers, created in 1389 for Philip's eventual successor John the Fearless. The Brothers (now lost) were for a time part of the Crown Jewels of England. The piece consisted of three rectangular red spinels of 70 carats each in a triangular arrangement, separated by three round white pearls of 10-20 carats each, with another pearl suspended from the lowest spinel. The middle of the pendant was a deep blue diamond cut as a pyramid or octahedron, and weighing about 30 carats.

Charles VI commissioned 32 works by Ruissel. 17 of these commissions stipulated that a duplicate of the work be made for his younger brother, Louis I, Duke of Orléans, as a gift.

Ruissel made 18 gold buttons decorated with broom flowers and heraldic mottos for the 1396 marriage of Isabella of Valois to King Richard II of England.

In 1400, Ruissel was commissioned to make a large image of the Trinity for Charles, using jewels – scores of pearls, and also diamonds, rubies, and sapphires – taken from a brooch in the form of a white-enameled golden hart and large golden collar which Richard II had given to Charles, and which Charles had had disassembled and melted down shortly after Richard's 1400 deposition and death.

Ruissel also made the piece now known as the Calvary of King Matthias Corvinus, a crucifix executed in gold, white enamel, pearls, and other gems, made using the Ronde-bosse technique. Margaret III, Countess of Flanders, commissioned the work as a gift celebrating the New Year in 1403 for her husband, Phillip the Bold. It is now in the treasury of Esztergom Basilica in Hungary.

For Henry V of England Ruissel created a golden necklace with white enamel bears, which were one of Henry's heraldic devices. The necklace was later gifted to Sigismund of Luxembourg, King of Germany and Hungary, on the occasion of his visit to England in 1416.

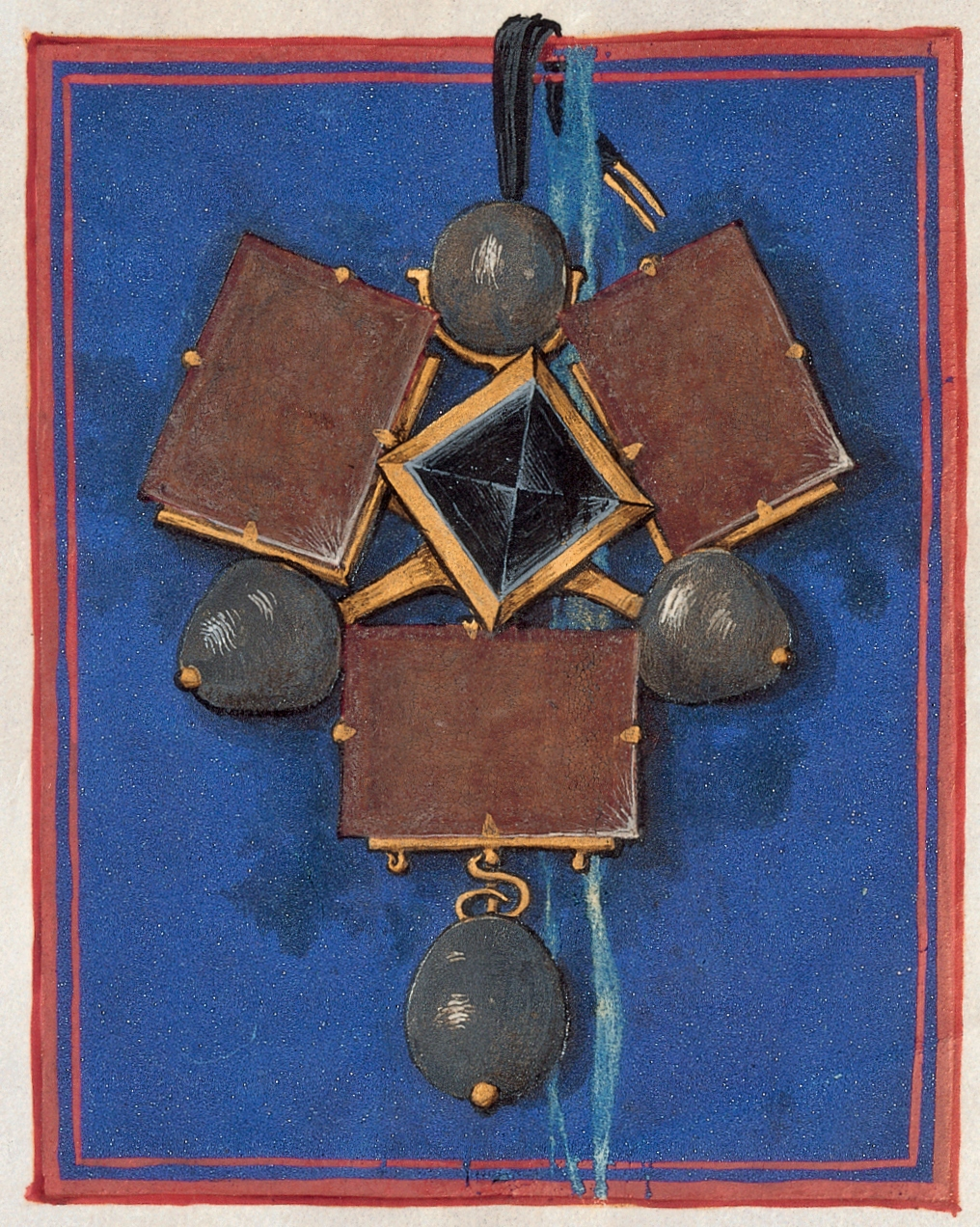
Miniature painting of the Three Brothers. The pearls are shown dark, probably due to a painting convention of the time.

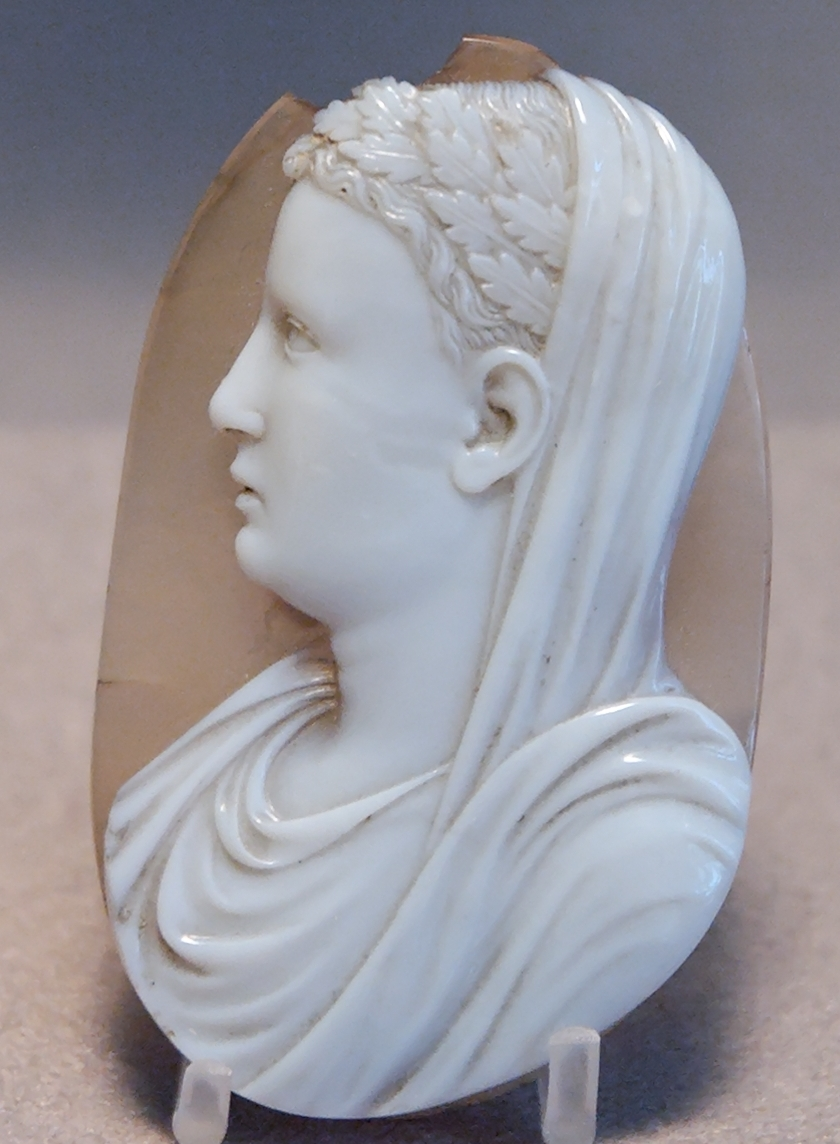
Cameo portrait of a prince, commissioned by John, Duke of Berry circa 1416 as part of a cross by Hermann Ruissel for the Sainte Chapelle in Bourges. The cross was made of silver gilt, studded with pearls, precious stones and cameos. The cameos were removed during the French Revolution, and the cross itself was melted down.

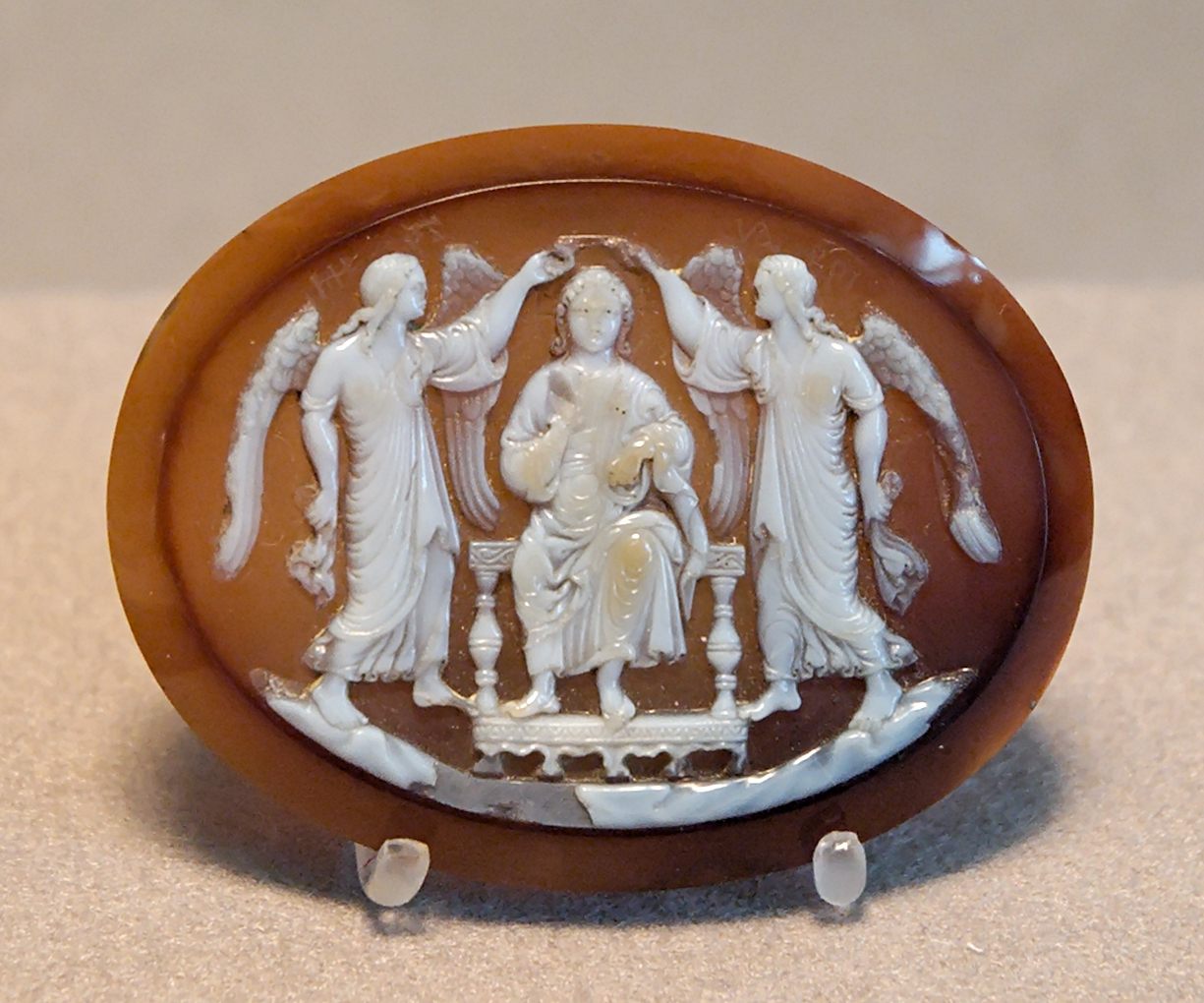
Cameo of an enthroned prince being crowned by two Victories, also removed from the destroyed cross of the Bourges Sainte Chapelle
