= Church of Saint-Hilaire le Grand =

Church in Nouvelle-Aquitaine, France

Coordinates: 46°34′38″N 0°19′58″E

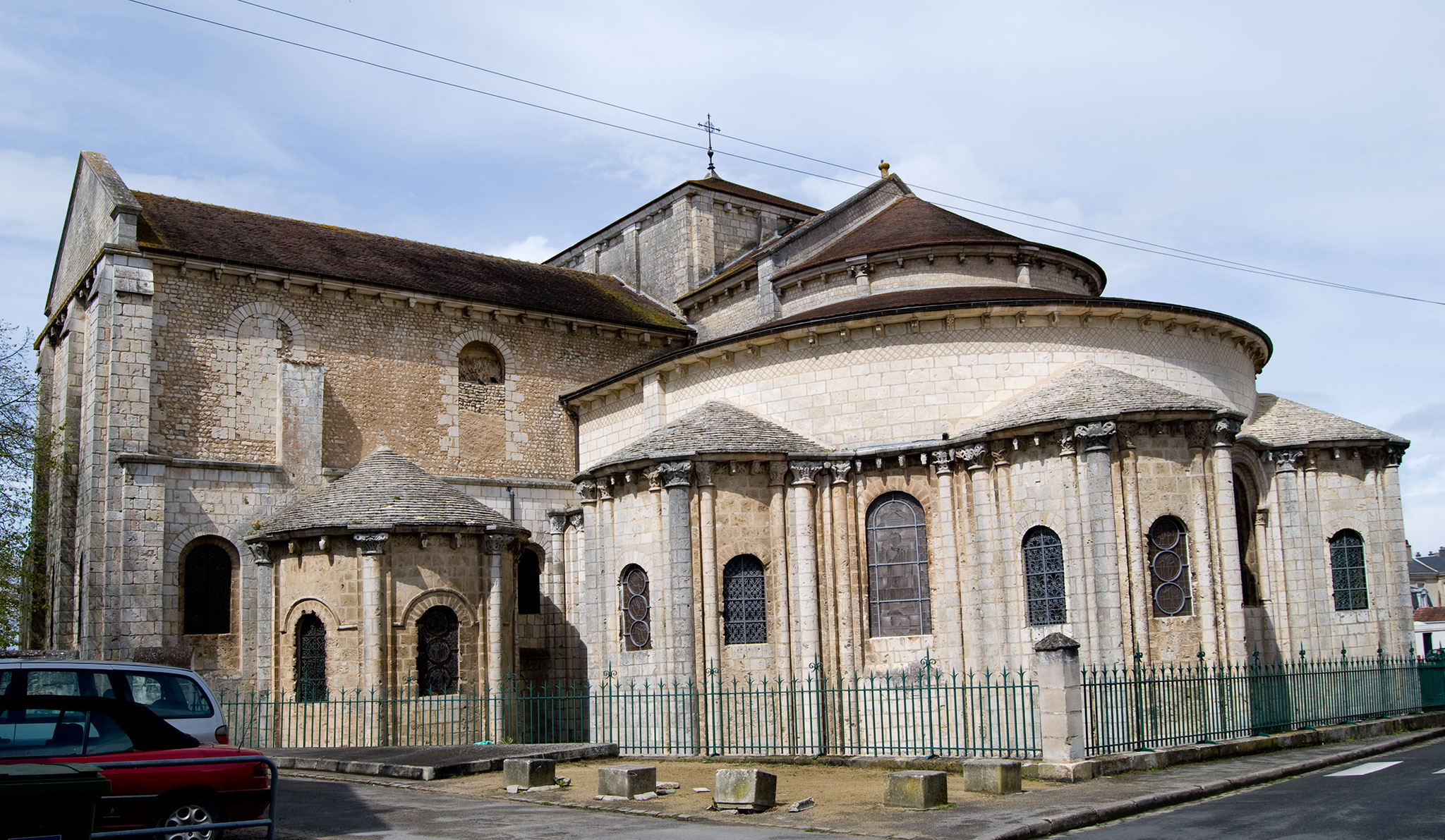
Saint-Hilaire-le-Grand

The Église Saint-Hilaire-le-Grand (French pronunciation: [eɡliz sɛ̃t‿ilɛʁ lə ɡʁɑ̃]) is a church in Poitiers, France. It was named after Hilary of Poitiers (Hilaire in French).

The church dates back to the 11th century, and was consecrated in 1049. It was damaged during the French Revolution and was restored in the second half of the 19th century. The church received a new portal, and the nave was partly reconstructed. The church was listed as Monument historique in 1840. It was also listed as a World Heritage Site by UNESCO in 1998 as part of the Routes of Santiago de Compostela in France.

== See also ==
- High medieval domes
