= 1460 in science =

The year 1460 AD in science and technology included many events, some of which are listed here.

== Astronomy ==
- Cardinal Johannes Bessarion proposed that Georg von Peuerbach and his pupil Regiomontanus create a new translation of Ptolemy's Almagest from the original Greek. Peuerbach worked on it with Regiomontanus until his death in 1461, at which time 6 volumes had been completed. Regiomontanus completed the project, and the final version was published in 1496.

== Exploration ==
- The Cape Verde Island of Sal is discovered, originally named "Llana" (meaning "flat").

== Technology ==
- The Catholicon is printed in Germany.
