= Treaty of Canterbury (1416) =

1416 alliance between the Holy Roman Empire and England

Emperor Sigismund (above) and King Henry V (bottom)
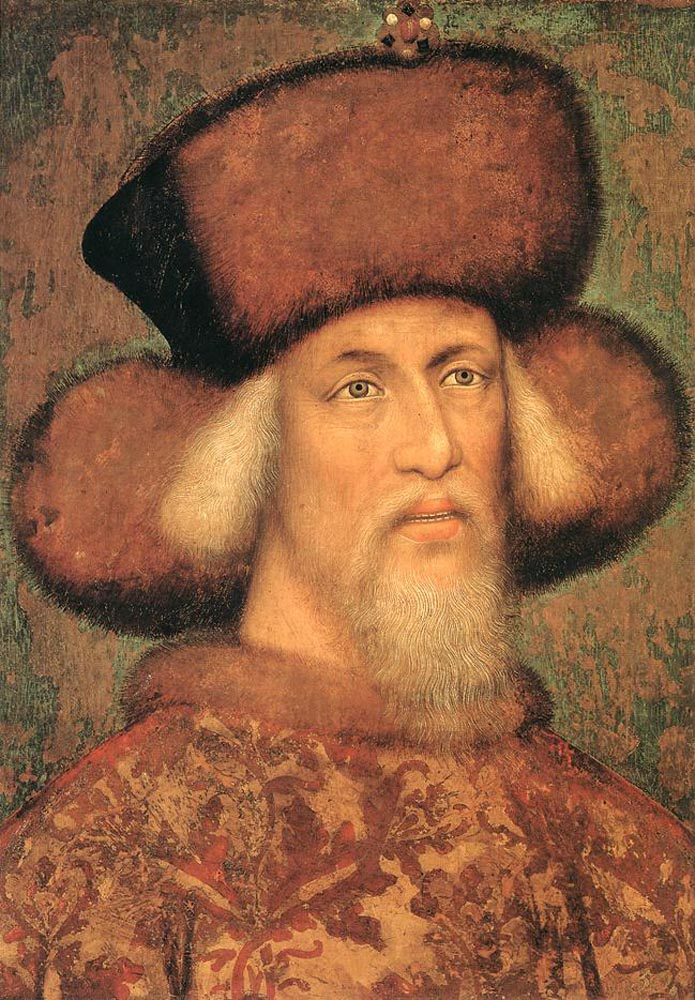
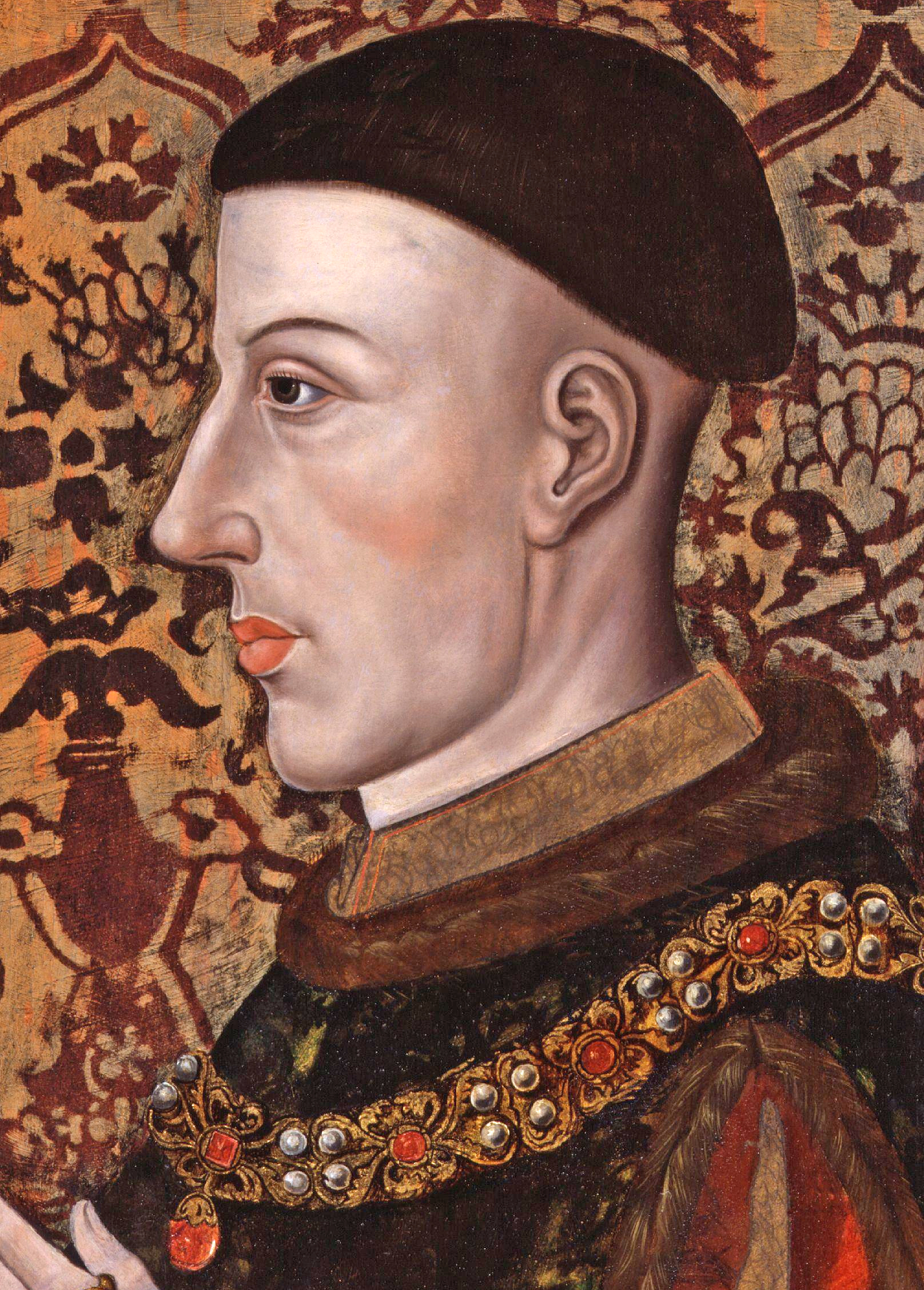

The Treaty of Canterbury was a diplomatic agreement concluded between Sigismund, Holy Roman Emperor, and King Henry V of England on 15 August 1416. The treaty resulted in a defensive and offensive alliance against France.

== Precipitating events ==
Sigismund began to shift his alliance from France to England after the French defeat at the Battle of Agincourt on 25 October 1415. After departing from the Council of Constance, Sigismund arrived in Paris on 1 March 1416. He was unable to reach an agreement with the French government because Bernard VII, Count of Armagnac wanted to maintain his naval blockade of Harfleur and prevent the English from maintaining a naval base in Normandy. In addition, Sigismund could not create an agreement that satisfied both the opposing Orléanist and Burgundian factions of the government.

As a result of his struggles in creating an agreement, Sigismund travelled to London on 3 May 1416 to negotiate with Henry V of England. Upon his arrival, Sigismund was made a Knight of the Garter, viewed a session of parliament and was gifted a golden necklace that was created by Hermann Ruissel and featured white enamel bears, one of Henry's heraldic devices. However, Sigismund still wanted a peace settlement and continued negotiating with France as well. In July 1416, Sigismund convinced Henry V and the French government to hold a conference in Paris between King Charles VI of France, Sigismund and Henry V to discuss a possible peace treaty.

However, Bernard VII of Armagnac, having lost the Battle of Valmont in 1416, convinced Charles VI and the French government to reject the embassy because he believed that it was just a scheme that would result in the English gaining the territory of Harfleur. Angered by the rejection, Sigismund resorted to creating the Treaty of Canterbury with only England, on the grounds that France favoured the schism and opposed any peace agreement with England.

== Motivations ==
Sigismund wanted to unify the Catholic Church and end the Papal schism. However, he believed that the tensions between the English and the French served as a major obstacle to accomplishing unification. In addition, Sigismund desired to create a united Europe to fight in a crusade against the Ottoman Empire.

== Terms of the treaty ==
The treaty was signed on 15 August 1416. Henry V and Sigismund pledged to each other that they would provide support to gain back any territories held by the French. The subjects of both rulers were given the ability to trade and move among each other's lands freely. They agreed that neither side would harbor traitors or rebels of the other but would aid each other during an invasion.

== Outcome ==
The Treaty of Canterbury, by favoring England and denouncing France, effectively ended the friendship between the House of Luxembourg and France, which Sigismund's grandfather, King John of Bohemia, had established. However, before the end of Henry V's reign, the policies established by the Treaty of Canterbury had been abandoned because Sigismund became more involved in the Council of Constance and his control over Bohemian territory and less concerned with Anglo-French politics. All of those distractions meant that Sigismund was never able to create any military support and that the true intent of the treaty was not fulfilled.
