= 1320s in music =

- 1310s
- 1320s in music
- 1330s
Other topics in 1320s:
- Art

Music timeline

The 1320s in music involved some events.

== Events ==
- 1321 – The Confrérie de St Julien-des-Ménétriers, the strongest of the medieval musicians' guilds, is established in Paris.
- 1322 – The Valladolid Council forbids hiring Moorish musicians to enliven Christian vigils.
- 1323 – Guillaume de Machaut becomes secretary to John of Luxembourg, King of Bohemia,
- 1326
  - March – Johannes de Muris moves to the double monastery of Fontevrault (Maine-et-Loire).
  - Robert de Handlo writes his treatise on music notation, Regule cum maximis magistri Franconis cum additionibus aliorum musicorum.

== Compositions ==
- 1324 – Guillaume de Machaut – Bone pastor Guillerme/Bone pastor qui pastores/[tenor], motet for three voices, composed for the appointment of Guillaume de Trie as Archbishop of Reims.

== Deaths ==
- 1325
  - 7 January – Denis of Portugal, monarch and troubadour (b. 1261).
  - 27 September – Amir Khusrow, Indian poet, scholar, and musician (b. 1253).
