= Robert of Beverley =

British mason and sculptor

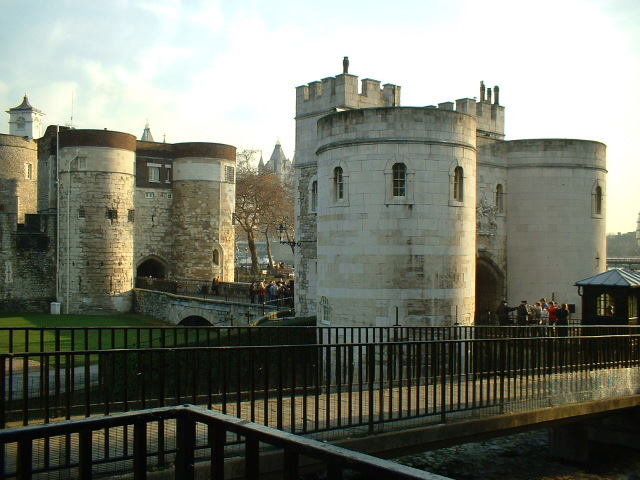
The Byward Tower (left) and Middle Tower (right), part of Robert's additions to the Tower of London

Robert of Beverley (died 1285) was a 13th-century British mason and sculptor who served as master mason of Westminster Abbey after Master John of Gloucester as well as contributing to the Tower of London (designing the outer ward, gates and barbican for Edward I) and a number of castles and manors as surveyor of the king's works. He may also have designed the innovative gatehouse of Tonbridge Castle, and the whole of Caerphilly Castle, and may have had an advisory role on Edward I's "iron ring" of castles in north Wales.
