= 2nd millennium BC in music =

3rd millennium BC in music - 2nd millennium BC in music - 1st millennium BC in music

== Events ==
- c. 2000 BC - Percussion instruments are added to Egyptian orchestras.
- c. 2000 BC - The trumpet is played in Denmark.
- c. 1580–1295 BC - Harps are played in Egypt.
- c. 1500 BC - Guitar, lyre, trumpet, and tambourine are used by the Hittites.
- c. 1400 BC - Hurrian songs, the oldest musical notation, is written in the ancient Amorite-Canaanite city of Ugarit.

== See also ==
- Timeline of musical events
