= Antonio Bamboccio =

Italian painter and sculptor

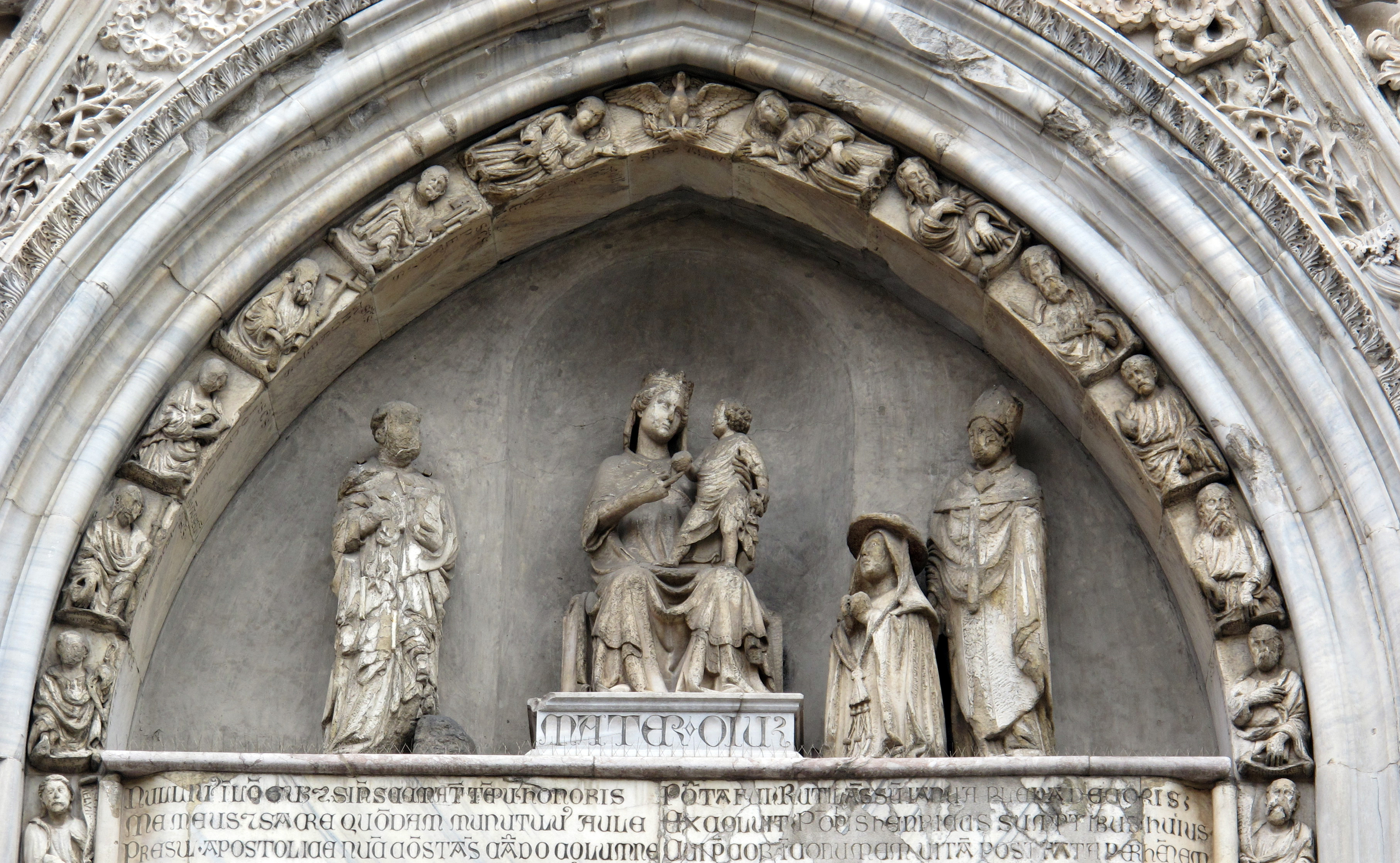
Central lunette of Naples Cathedral

Antonio Bambocci (1351?–1421?) was an Italian painter and sculptor of the Gothic period, active in and near Naples.

He was born in Peperino, and came to Naples with his father Domenico, also a sculptor. He initially trained with Masuccio, and afterwards by Andrea Ciccione. His masters in painting were Colantino del Fiore and Antonio Solario. He is best known for the sepulchral monuments which he executed, such as those in memory of cardinals Filippo Minutólo and Carbone. In that magnificent one of Lodovico Aldemareschi, which he executed in 1421, an inscription is placed, in which Bambocci calls himself not only a sculptor, but also a painter and brassfounder. The chapel in which this monument was placed was adorned with his pictures. In 1407 he made, by order of cardinal Errico, archbishop of Naples, the architrave and other ornaments of the large door of the cathedral. The doors of the churches of Pappacoda, di St. Agustino alla Zecca, were also executed by him. From his school a great many good artists went forth, such as Angelo Agnello del Fiore and Guglielmo Monaco.

Rose states he was born c. 1368 and died about 1435.

== Bibliography ==
- Ticozzi, Stefano (1830). Dizionario degli architetti, scultori, pittori, intagliatori in rame ed in pietra, coniatori di medaglie, musaicisti, niellatori, intarsiatori d'ogni etá e d'ogni nazione' (Volume 1). Milan: Gaetano Schiepatti. p. 103.
- Rose, Reverend Hugh James (1848). A New General Biographical Dictionary (Volume III). London: B. Fellowes. p. 100.
