= 1340s in music =

- 1330s
- 1340s in music
- 1350s
Other topics in 1340s:
- Art

Music timeline

The 1340s in music involved some events.

== Events ==
- 1342
  - exact date not known – the St. Martin's Cathedral, Utrecht founds the koraalhuis (a house for its choristers), to assist the rector scolarum in the performance of polyphonic music.
- 1343
  - exact date not known – At the request of composer and music theorist Philippe de Vitry, the mathematician Gersonides writes De numeris harmonicis (On Harmonic Numbers), based on a postulate of Vitry's and once thought (erroneously) to concern the calculation of musical intervals.
- 1344
  - exact date not known – Donato da Cascia applies for a canonry in Liège.
- 1348
  - exact date not known – Lorenzo da Firenze becomes a canonicus at San Lorenzo, Florence, a post he would hold until his death in December 1372 or January 1373.

== Bands formed ==
- 1346 – Elector Palatine Ruprecht I establishes the court chapel (Sängerey) in Heidelberg.

== Compositions ==
- before 1342 – Guillaume de Machaut, complainte "Tels rit au main" from Le Remède de Fortune, chanson royale "Joie, plaisence" from Le Remède de Fortune, lais L19 "Qui n'aroit autre deport" from Le Remède de Fortune, rondeaux R22 "Dame, mon cuer" from Le Remède de Fortune, virelais V33 "Dame, a vous sans retollier" from Le Remède de Fortune
- 1342 – Philippe de Vitry, Petre Clemens/Lugentium siccentur/Non est inventus (motet for three voices), written at Christmas for Pope Clement VI.
- 1346 – Jacopo da Bologna, O in Italia, madrigal with a text celebrating the birth on 4 August of twin sons to the Milanese ruler Luchino Visconti.
