= 1470s in music =

- 1460s
- 1470s in music
Other topics in 1470s:
- Art

Music timeline

This is a list of notable events in music that took place in the 1470s.

== Events ==
- 1470
  - 5 August – Guillaume Du Fay purchases some land in his homeland of Beersel to provide an income to establish his obiit.
  - October – Antoine Busnois first becomes a member of the Burgundian chapel as a demi-chappelain (he would be promoted to full chaplain in 1472).
  - November – Antoine Busnois is paid for "services ... of which the duke [of Burgundy] wished no further mention to be made in the accounts"—probably a delicate diplomatic mission recruiting new musicians from another court.
  - Blind organist, harpist, lutenist, and fiddle player Conrad Paumann tours Italy, where his playing on various instruments causes a sensation at the court of the Gonzagas in Mantua.
- 1471
  - After fifteen years in the humble position of clerc in the Burgundian court chapel, Robert Morton is promoted to chappelain, a position in which he would remain until early 1476.
- 1475 – Organ builder Lorenzo da Prato completes his masterpiece, the organ in cornu Epistolae of the San Petronio Basilica in Bologna.

== Bands formed ==
- 1479 – The Gosudarevï Pevchiye d′Yaki (literally Ruler’s Singing Clerks, the court choir of Moscow), is established by Ivan the Great.

== Publications ==
- 1470 – Approximate date of the completion of the Buxheim Organ Book
- 1471 – Professional scribe Clara Hätzlerin completes her Liederbuch in Augsburg.
- ca. 1473 – The Königsteiner Liederbuch is completed.
- 1475 – Johannes Tinctoris, Terminorum musicae diffinitorium, compiled by this year.
- 1476 – Johannes Tinctoris, Liber de natura et proprietate tonorum, completed 6 November.
- 1477 – Johannes Tinctoris, Liber de arte contrapuncti, completed 11 October.

== Compositions ==
- 1470 – Guillaume Du Fay, Requiem Mass, for three voices (lost)
- ca.1470–73 – Guillaume Du Fay, Missa Ave Regina Celorum
- 1472 – Loyset Compère, Omnium bonorum plena, motet, possibly written for the dedication of Cambrai Cathedral on 2 July.
- 1473 – Johannes Martini, Perfunde coeli rore, motet in four voices, composed for the wedding of Duke Ercole I d'Este and Eleonora d'Aragona
- ca. 1476 – Alexander Agricola, Gaudent in celis, motet

== Births ==
- 1470
  - 9 April – Giovanni Angelo Testagrossa, Italian lutenist, singer, and teacher (d. December 1530)
  - Approximately this year
    - Elzéar Genet, dit Carpentras, French composer (d. 1548)
    - Antoine de Févin, French composer (d. 1511 or 1512)
    - Mathurin Forestier, French composer
    - Francisco de Peñalosa, Spanish composer (d. 1528)
    - Michele Pesenti, Italian composer and lutenist (d. after 1524)
    - Bartolomeo Tromboncino, Italian composer of frottole (d. after 1535)

== Deaths ==
- 1470
  - 25 February – Richard de Bellengues, dit Cardot, French singer and composer (b. ca. 1380)
- 1473
  - 24 January – Conrad Paumann, German organist, harpist, lutenist, fiddle player, and composer (b. ca.1410)
- 1474
  - 27 November – Guillaume Du Fay, French composer (b. ca. 1397; illness)
- 1479
  - After 13 March – Robert Morton (composer) (b. ca. 1430)
