= 1330s in music =

- 1320s
- 1330s in music
- 1340s
Other topics in 1330s:
- Art

Music timeline

The 1330s in music included several notable events and developments.

== Events ==
- 1330
  - Juan Ruiz, the Arcipreste de Hita, writes the first version of his El libro de buen amor, which describes many musical practices in Spain.
- 1334
  - February – Merlin, a vidulator at the court of Edward III was given leave and a grant towards his expenses to go to minstrel schools on the Continent, probably at Mechelen, Ypres, or Deventer, where there were celebrated schools for fiddlers.
- 1337
  - exact date unknown – Pedro IV of Aragon summons to his court the musicians Ali Eziqua and Çahat Mascum, his favourite players of the rebec and exabeba.
- 1338
  - 28 January (by modern reckoning; 1337 by ecclesiastical usage of the time) – Guillaume de Machaut takes up a canonicate in Reims, "per procuratiorem" (i.e., by proxy).

== Bands formed ==
- 1334 – Pope Benedict XII institutes the Papal Cappella, which would eventually become the Capella Sistina.
