= 1310s in music =

- 1300s
- 1310s in music
- 1320s
Other topics in 1310s:
- Art

Music timeline

The 1310s in music involved some events.

== Events ==
- 1310 – Completion of the first book of the short version of the Roman de Fauvel, possibly by Gervès du Bus, who later would write the second book.
- 1313 – Augsburg Cathedral receives a bequest from the bishop to promote choral singing.
- 1314
  - 6 December – Gervès du Bus completes of the second book of the Roman de Fauvel.
- 1316 – A "Mistro Zucchetto" is appointed organist at St Mark's, Venice, in the earliest document related to music at that church.
- 1317 – Chaillou de Pesstain expands the Roman de Fauvel.
- 1318 –
  - In the week before Laetare Sunday in Lent, the annual assembly ("school") of minstrels is held in Bruges.
  - exact date unknown – Deacon Niphon of Grottaferrata copies MS V-CVbav gr.1562 with hymns in the eight modes (oktōēchos) for Sundays.

== Compositions ==
- 1314 – Philippe de Vitry, Garrit gallus/In nova fert/Neuma (motet, for three voices)

== Deaths ==
- 1318
  - 29 November – Frauenlob (Heinrich von Meissen), minnesinger (b. c.1250-1260).
- 1319
  - exact date unknown – Remigio dei Girolami, Italian philosopher and music theorist (b. 1235).
