= 1360s in music =

- 1350s
- 1360s in music
- 1370s
Other topics in 1360s:
- Art

Music timeline

The 1360s in music involved some significant events.

== Events ==
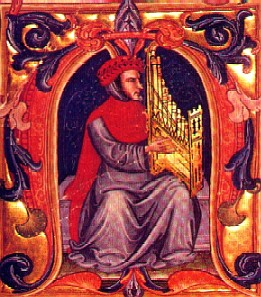
Francesco Landini playing an organ

- 1361
  - The Dauphin of France (the future Charles V) is a guest in the house of Guillaume de Machaut in Reims.
  - Francesco Landini is appointed organist at the monastery of Santa Trinita in Florence.
- 1362 –
  - Niccolò da Perugia and Gherardello da Firenze visit the monastery of Santa Trinita in Florence.
  - The first documented use of polyphony in Brussels, at the collegiate church of Ste Gudule.

== Compositions ==
- 1360
  - January – Two motets by Guillaume de Machaut, No. 21 Veni, creator spiritus and No. 23 Inviolata genitrix, are composed in response to the Siege of Reims.
- after 1360 – Guillaume de Machaut motet No. 21 "Plange, regni respublica / Tu qui gregem tuum ducis / Apprehende arma et scutum et exurge"
- 1365 – Guillaume de Machaut's Messe de Nostre Dame had been composed by this year.
- 1369 – Johannes Vaillant's double-texted (ballade) for three voices, Dame doucement trait / Doulz amis de cuer parfait, was copied in Paris (compilatum fuit parisius) into the Chantilly Codex (fol. 26v), and thus likely was composed in that year.
- unknown – Guillaume de Machaut – David Hoquetus

== Deaths ==
- 1361 –
  - ?May – Lodewijk Heyligen, Franco-Flemish music theorist.
  - 9 June – Philippe de Vitry, French composer (b. 1291).
