= Giovanni Colonna (cardinal, 1295–1348) =

14th-century Roman Catholic cardinal

Giovanni Colonna (1295, Arezzo, Tuscany, Italy – 3 July 1348, Avignon, France) was a Roman Catholic cardinal during the Avignon papacy and was a scion of the famous Colonna family that played an important role in Italian history.

== Biography ==
Giovanni Colonna was born in Rome around the year 1295 from Stefano Colonna il Vecchio and Insula Calcedonio. His brother Giacomo became a bishop.

Giovanni was appointed Cardinal by Pope John XXII during the consistory of 18 December 1327 and granted the diaconate of Sant'Angelo in Pescheria. From 1330 until 1343, he employed the scholar Petrarch on his ecclesiastical staff.

He participated in the Papal conclave of 1334 in which Pope Benedict XII was elected and that of 1342 in which Pope Clement VI was elected. During the conclave of 1342, he was head of the Italian cardinals who wanted the seat of the papacy to return to Rome. In the same year 1342 he was appointed Archpriest of the Basilica of St. John Lateran. He was also canon of the Bayeux Cathedral in France and provost of Mainz Cathedral in Germany.

He had a good education which probably included legal studies. He persuaded Pope Clement VI to send several Franciscan friars to preach the Gospel in Armenia. He wrote a life of the popes from Saint Peter to Boniface VIII. He was a close friend of Petrarch who corresponded with him. The Flemish music theorist Ludovicus Sanctus, who was also a good friend of Petrarch, was employed by him as magister in musica.

He died in Avignon on 3 July 1348 from the plague.

== Sources ==
- Beattie, Blake R. (2007). Angelus Pacis: The Legation of Cardinal Giovanni Gaetano Orsini, 1326-1334. Brill. ISBN 9789004153936.
- Wilkins, Ernest H. (1957). "Descriptions of Pagan Divinities from Petrarch to Chaucer". Speculum. 32 (3 (Jul.)): 511–522.
- The Cardinals of the Holy Roman Church Biographical Dictionary Pope John XXII (1316 - 1334) Consistory of December 18, 1327 (IV)
