= 1370s in music =

- 1360s
- 1370s in music
- 1380s
Other topics in 1370s:
- Art

Music timeline

The 1370s in music involved some significant events.

== Events ==
- 1371 – Ludi theatrales (the earliest mention of vernacular biblical plays in Eastern Europe) were banned from the Corpus Christi processions in Bohemia.

== Compositions ==
- 1378 – Matheus de Sancto Johanne, Inclite flos orti Gebenensis, (ballade) for three voices, dedicated to Pope Clement VII, who bestowed a canonicate in Laon upon the composer in this year.

== Bands formed ==
- 1372 – Cappela della Signoria, in the Republic of Lucca.

== Births ==
- Possible decade – Leonel Power, English composer (d. 1445)

== Deaths ==
- 1372 (December) or 1373 (January) – Lorenzo da Firenze, Italian composer
- 1377 – April: Guillaume de Machaut, French composer and poet (b. c.1300)
