= Anna Inglese =

15th-century singer in Italy

Anna Inglese (floruit 1468 – 1499) was a prominent singer at the courts of Galeazzo Maria Sforza, Duke of Milan and Ferdinand I of Naples and one of the very few professional women singers working in 15th-century Italy. Over two centuries later, she was listed in Istoria delle donne scientiate (History of Learned Women) simply as "excellent in music, she lived in 1470." Little is known about her life, and what is available has come from 15th-century archival material. She is thought to have originally come from England and hence was referred to as "Inglese" (Italian for "English"). She was also referred to as "Madamma (or Madama) Anna". Her actual surname is unknown.

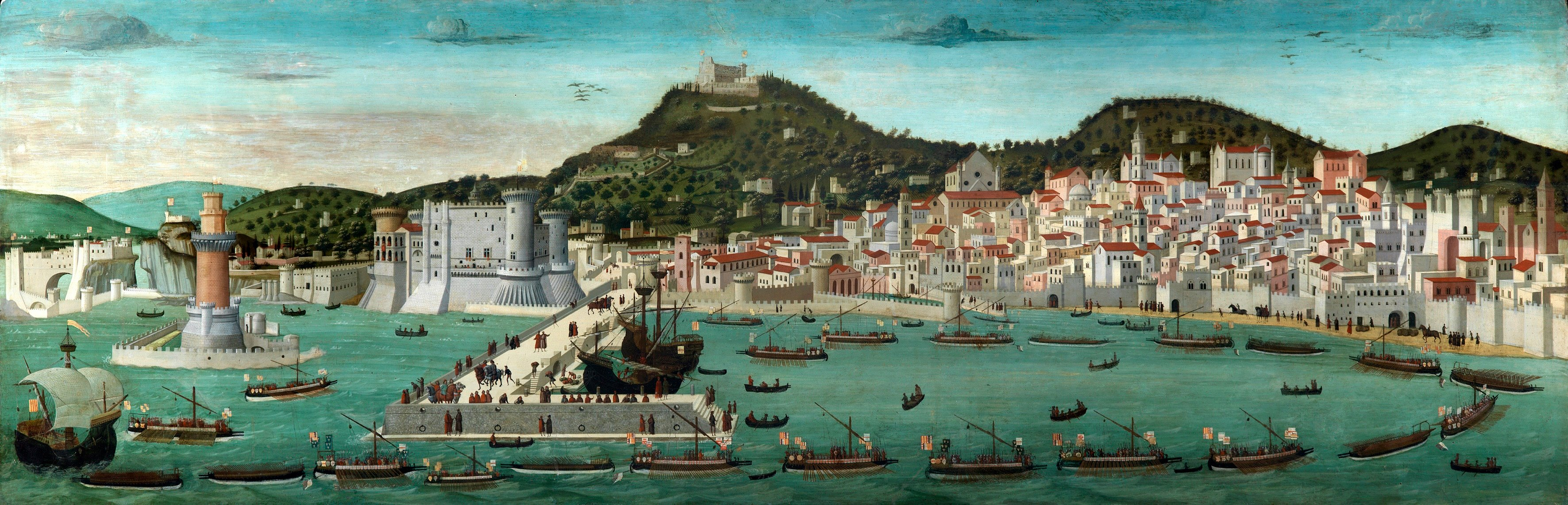
Naples in the late 15th century when Anna Inglese was a singer at the court of Ferdinand I

One of the earliest documentations of her activity was in 1468 when she was recommended by Gugliemo di Monferrato as a singer for Galeazzo Maria Sforza and Bona of Savoy's impending wedding festivities. Monferrato, who had been Galeazzo Sforza's tutor, noted in his letter that in addition to singing, Anna could also devise entertainments and was an honourable person. Anna arrived in Milan in the Spring of 1468 with a sizable retinue that also included at least one tenorista (a musician who accompanied the singer on the lute or violin). They remained there for several months and were lodged in the house of Donato Cagnola, one of the permanent singers at Galeazzo Sforza's court. During that time Cagnola wrote a letter to Sforza complaining at having to host Anna's "brigade" at his own expense. On her departure from Milan, the Duke paid Anna 100 ducats, a large sum at the time, and provided an expensive set of new clothes for her tenorista.

The next existing record of her is in 1471 when she was listed as a singer employed at the court of Ferdinand I of Naples and referred to as "Madamma Anna". The following year a letter to Galeazzo Sforza from the Milanese ambassador to Naples described Anna dancing with Ferdinand's daughter Leonora in the palace gardens. Anna was mentioned on the payrolls of the Neapolitan court again in 1476, twice more in the 1480s, and finally in 1499 when she was paid 150 ducats for her services. Also listed on the 1499 payroll was a certain "Galderi de Madamma Anna", whom Allan Atlas speculates was most probably her son. However, Bonnie Blackburn has noted that there are no other surviving records which mention Galderi and he may have simply been Anna's tenorista.

Blackburn and other musicologists have also found possible references to Anna prior to 1468. Blackburn has speculated that she may have been the young English woman who entertained the 11-year-old Galeazzo Sforza in Venice in 1455. A letter by one of Galeazzo's tutors to his father stated that amongst the group of "very notable singers" at a banquet in the boy's honour was "an English damsel who sang so sweetly and suavely that it seemed not a human voice, but divine." Lewis Lockwood notes (as does Blackburn) a payment record at the court of Borso d'Este, Duke of Ferrara in 1465 for "Anna, cantarina Anglica" ("Anna, English singer"). On this basis, James Haar and John Nádas have proposed that Anna Inglese may have been a relative (wife or sister) of another English musician at the Ferrara court, Robertus de Anglia (Robert of England), also known as Roberto Inglese. Robertus was at the Ferrara court from 1454 until 1467 and then went to Bologna as magister cantus at the San Petronio Basilica. He remained in Bologna until 1474 when he apparently returned to England.
