= Matteo da Perugia =

Italian composer

Matteo da Perugia (fl. 1400–1416) was a Medieval Italian composer, presumably from Perugia. From 1402 to 1407 he was the first magister cappellae of the Milan Cathedral; his duties included being cantor and teaching three boys selected by the Cathedral deputies.

== Life and career ==
Little is known about his life apart from this. Willi Apel asserted that he was the principal composer of his generation, but this claim was challenged by Heinrich Besseler, and Matteo's historical position remains an open question. Neither has there yet been a thorough stylistic study of his compositions. He wrote many contra-tenors to existing works, which resulted in many of these being wrongly ascribed to him. Matteo wrote in many forms, including the virelai, the ballade, and the rondeau. One of his patrons was Antipope Alexander V.

== Sources ==
- Günther, Ursula, and Anne Stone. "Matteo da Perugia", Grove Music Online, ed. L. Macy (accessed December 29, 2005), grovemusic.com (subscription access).
- Arlt, Wulf [in German] (1973). "The Development of French Secular Music during the Fourteenth Century". Musica Disciplina. 27: 41–59. JSTOR 20532157.
