= Zhu Derun =

Chinese painter and poet

Zhu Derun (simplified Chinese: 朱德润; traditional Chinese: 朱德潤; pinyin: Zhū Dérùn; Wade–Giles: Chu Te-jun; 1294–1365), Zemin (泽民) by style name, Suiyang Shanren (睢阳山人) by pseudonym, was a Chinese painter and poet in Yuan Dynasty. He was a native of Suiyang (now Shangqiu), Henan Province, and later lived in Suzhou. He was at one time the editor at the national academy of history, and also served as academic director in Zhendong Province, and supervisor in Jiangzhe Province.

He excelled in calligraphy, following the styles of Zhao Mengfu and Wang Xizhi, utilizing strong and bold brushstrokes. He was also an expert of landscape painting, and inherited the techniques of Xu Daoning and Guo Xi. His paintings typically boasted distant mountains, sturdy peaks and robust trees. The mountain stones were depicted by cirrus-cloud brushstrokes, and the branches of trees simulated crab claws, with realistic beauty. Preserved works include Pavilion of Elegant Plain (秀野轩图), Playing Lyre under the Trees (林下鸣琴图), and Boating on the Pine Creek (松溪放艇图).

He was renowned for his poems too. Most of his works portrayed landscapes and items. Some accused the unjust society, such as "People were not born villains. The oppressive government coerced them into crimes." He authored Collected Works of Cunfu Studio (存复斋集), 10 columns plus one supplement.

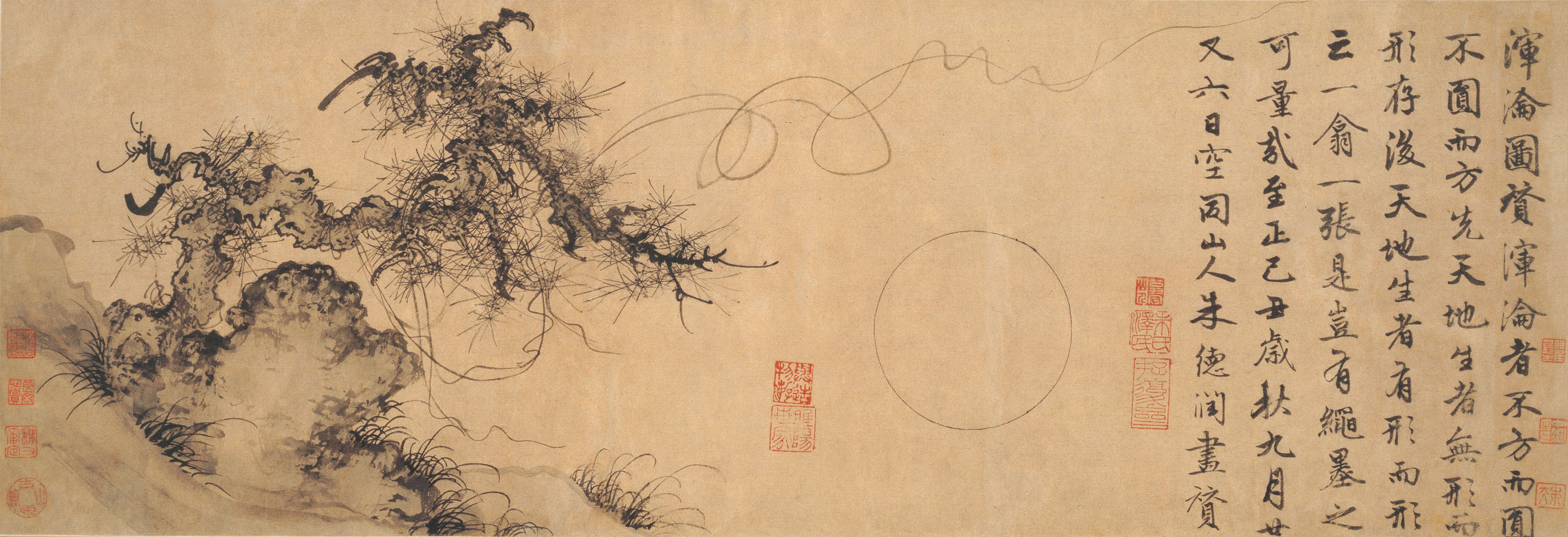
Primordial Chaos (浑沦图), ink on paper, height: 29.7; width: 86.2, year: 1349, Location Shanghai Museum
