= Lodewijk Heyligen =

Music Theorist

Lodewijk Heyligen (also known as Ludovicus Sanctus de Beeringhen, Lodewijk Heiligen, Ludovicus Sanctus, Heyliger of Beeringhen, Ludwig van Kempen and Louis van Campen) (1304, Beringen, Belgium – 1361, Avignon) was a Flemish Benedictine monk and music theorist who served as the master of music of cardinal Giovanni Colonna in Avignon. There he became one of the closest friends of the Italian poet Petrarch. His Latin name Ludovicus Sanctus (sometimes rendered as Santus) means Louis the Saint and is a literal translation of the Flemish name Lodewijk Heyligen.

== Biography ==
Very little is known about the early life of Lodewijk Heyligen. It is believed he was born in Beringen. Beringen was located in the archdeaconry of Campine (in Dutch: Aartsdiakonaat Kempenland) which in turn was part of the Prince-Bishopric of Liège. This is at the origin of Lodewijk's alternative names of Ludwig van Kempen and Louis van Campen. After studies at the Latin College in Beringen, he studied music at the abbey school of St. Laurent in Liège. After taking holy orders he traveled to the papal court in Avignon where he became linked to Cardinal Giovanni Colonna. He first became a cantor and later secretary to Colonna and was also the master of music at the Chapel of Colonna. He was further appointed cantor of the St. Donatian's Cathedral in Bruges in 1342.

In a letter to the chapter of the St. Donatian's Cathedral dated 27 April 1348 the content of which has been partially preserved, Lodewijk Heyligen describes the horrors of the plague that was then raging in Europe. He ascribes the origin of the plague to calamitous events in India and the arrival in Genoa and later Marseille of merchant ships coming from the Orient. The letter recounts that half of the population of Avignon had died of the disease and that 11,000 of them had been buried in a new cemetery.

After his master Colonna died from the plague in 1348 he remained principally in Avignon where he died in 1361.

== Music theorist ==
He is probably the author of two treatises on music formerly attributed to Louis of Toulouse (1274–1297), De musicae commendacione (which is lost) and the Sentencia in musica sonora subiecti (which still exists). The latter treatise is structured as a scholastic investigation into the essence of music, which he refers to as musica sonora. He concludes that the essence of music is found primarily in the relation between number and sound, secondly in the relation of one sound to another and finally—based on the first two categories—in the determination of properties, emotions and modulations.

== Friend of Petrarch ==
In his writings, Petrarch refers to a close friend that he calls 'Socrates'. His real name remained uncertain until 1904, when Ursmer Berlière identified him as Lodewijk Heyligen. His relationship with Petrarch can be traced back to the year 1330, when Petrarch was visiting Bishop Giacomo Colonna in Lombez. There he became acquainted with Giacomo's brother cardinal Giovanni and his entourage of which Lodewijk Heyligen formed a part. They were the same age and became very close. Petrarch wrote about 20 letters to Lodewijk which have been preserved. Petrarch alludes in his letters to the curious fact that Socrates is the only one of his good friends, who was not given to him by Italy, but instead by the Campine (Kempen). However, the letter continues, Socrates through his temperament, and especially his friendship with Petrarch himself, had almost become Italian himself.

Petrarch refers to Lodewijk Heyligen as a very learned man, who was also distinguished by his musical gifts. Petrarch praises him for his elevated character and his loyal friendship. It is possible that Lodewijk Heyligen inspired in Petrarch the desire to visit the Southern Netherlands (present-day Belgium), a trip that the two friends may have taken together.

In his letters to Lodewijk Heyligen, Petrarch often discloses his inner feelings. None of the letters that Lodewijk Heyligen wrote to Petrarch have been preserved. Yet it was through a letter from Lodewijk Heyligen that Petrarch received the news of the death of his beloved Laura, the muse of Petrarch's poetry. Lodewijk may have been present when she died. In the letter to which Petrarcha refers, Lodewijk assured Petrarch that when Laura died angels took her soul up into heaven.

When Petrarch edited a collection of his letters, he dedicated the collection entitled Epistolae de rebus familiaribus (Familiar Letters) to his friend referred to as Socrates. The death of Lodewijk Heyligen in 1361 affected Petrarch painfully. A note in his Virgil-codex reveals his sadness upon receiving the news of his death: "Amisi comitem ac solatium meae vitae" (I have lost my comrade and the solace of my life!). Petrarch also called up the memory of his friend in a passage in the Trionfo d'Amore (Triumph of Love, from Triumphs) where he recognizes Socrates and Lelio (the literary nickname of Stefano Romano, a mutual friend of Petrarch and Lodewijk) amid the crowd, which is carried behind the chariot of Cupid:

In the original language:

Poco era fuor de la comune strada,
quando Socrate e Lelio vidi in prima:
con lor più lunga via conven ch'io vada.
O qual coppia d'amici! che né 'n rima
poria né 'n prosa ornar assai né 'n versi,
se, come dee, virtù nuda si stima.
Con questi duo cercai monti diversi,
andando tutti tre sempre ad un giogo;
a questi le mie piaghe tutte apersi;
da costor non mi pò tempo né luogo
divider mai, siccome io spero e bramo,
infino al cener del funereo rogo;
con costor colsi 'l glorïoso ramo,
onde forse anzi tempo ornai le tempie
in memoria di quella ch'io tanto amo.

In English translation:

Not far from the common path had I yet moved
When first I saw my Socrates, and with him
My Laelius: with them I still move on.
Oh what a pair of friends! Never could I
In verse or prose tell rightly of their worth
If at its due pure virtue be esteemed.
With these twain I have travelled many lands,
A common yoke holding us close together:
To them I told the tale of all my wounds.
Nor time nor distance e'er shall separate
Us from each other—so I hope and pray
Until for us the funeral pyres be lit.
With them I plucked the glorious laurel branch
Wherewith—perhaps too soon—I decked my brow,
Remembering her whom I so deeply love.

These words speak convincingly of the intimate friendship that Petrarch felt for Lodewijk.
