= Elio =

- Pronunciation: Italian: [ˈɛːljo]
- Gender: Male
- Language: Italian

Other names
- Related names: Hélio, Eliomar

Elio is an Italian male given name.

== Origin ==
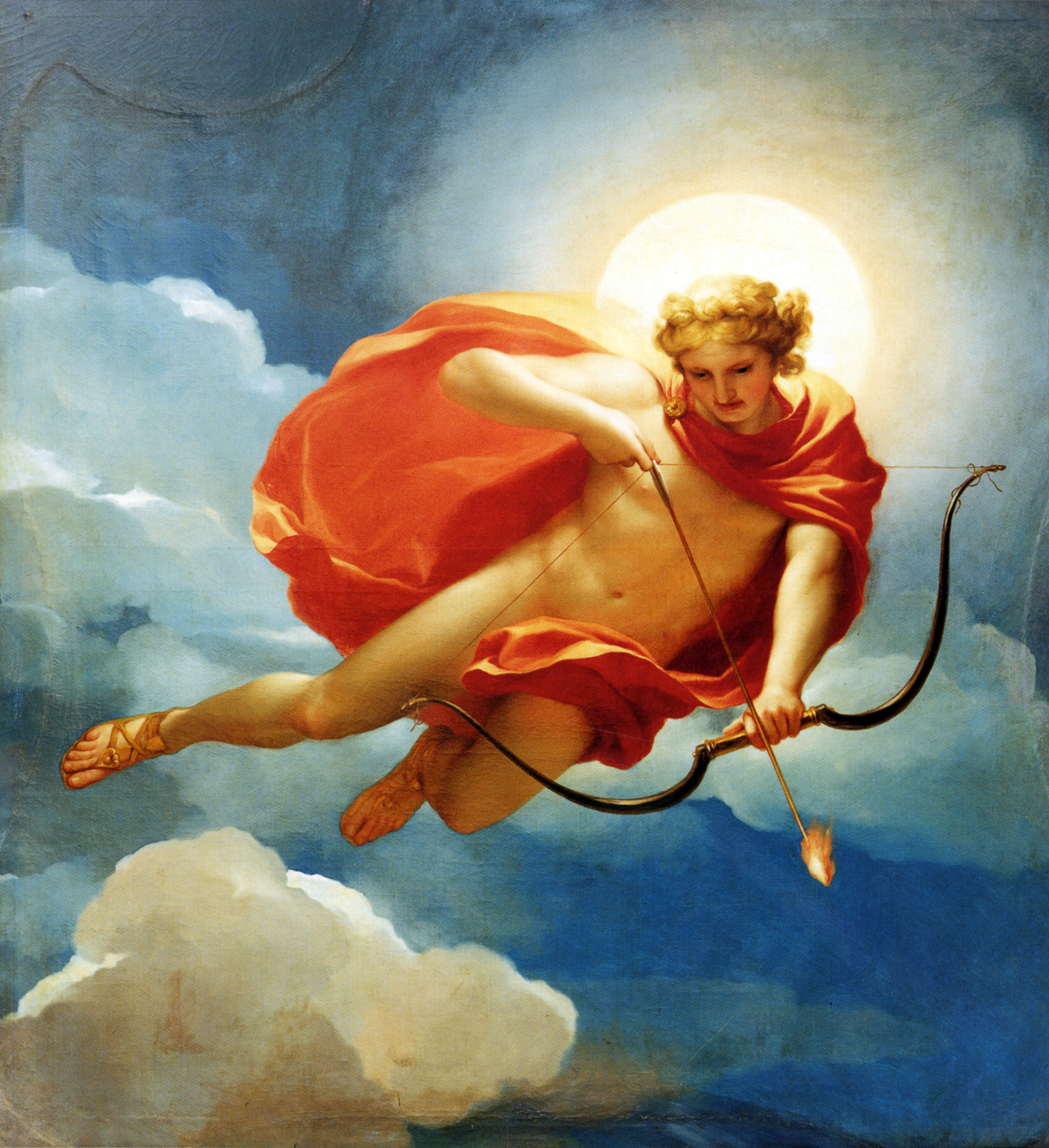
The god Helios in a painting by Anton Raphael Mengs.

A name of dual origin, Elio is primarily a revival of Elio (Helios), the Greek god of the Sun. Elio derives, through the Latin Helius, from the Ancient Greek Ἥλιος (Hélios), which is taken from the noun of the same and means 'Sun'. It shares the same meaning as the Italian feminine name Sole, the Romanian masculine name Sorin and the Lithuanian feminine name Saulė.

Elio is also believed to originate from the Roman cognomen Aelius (feminine Aelia), which was held by the emperor Hadrian and thus dates back to the 2nd century. The origin is uncertain, perhaps Etruscan or perhaps from the Latin alius, '[an] other'. Some sources trace its origin to the Greek Ἥλιος (Hélios), a connection categorically rejected by others. The patronymic name Eliano is similarly derived from the Roman cognomen.

Elio may also be a hypocorism of other names such as Aurelio or Cornelio. In Italy, the name Elio occurs throughout and is promoted through the worship of saints with the name. There is also a feminine form, Èlia; however, to avoid confusion with the biblical masculine name Elìa (Elijah), it is generally replaced by Elina or Eliana.

== Variants ==
- Masculine: Eleo, Elios
- Feminine: Èlia, Elea

=== Variants in other languages ===
- Catalan: Heli, Hèlios
- Helius
- Polish: Heliusz
- Portuguese: Hélio
- Romanian: Eliu
- Russian: Илий (Ilij)
- Spanish: Helio, Helios

== Name day ==
The name day can be celebrated on October 28 in memory of saint Helios, bishop of Lyon, or on July 18 in memory of saint Elio, deacon and bishop of Koper.

== People with the given name Elio ==
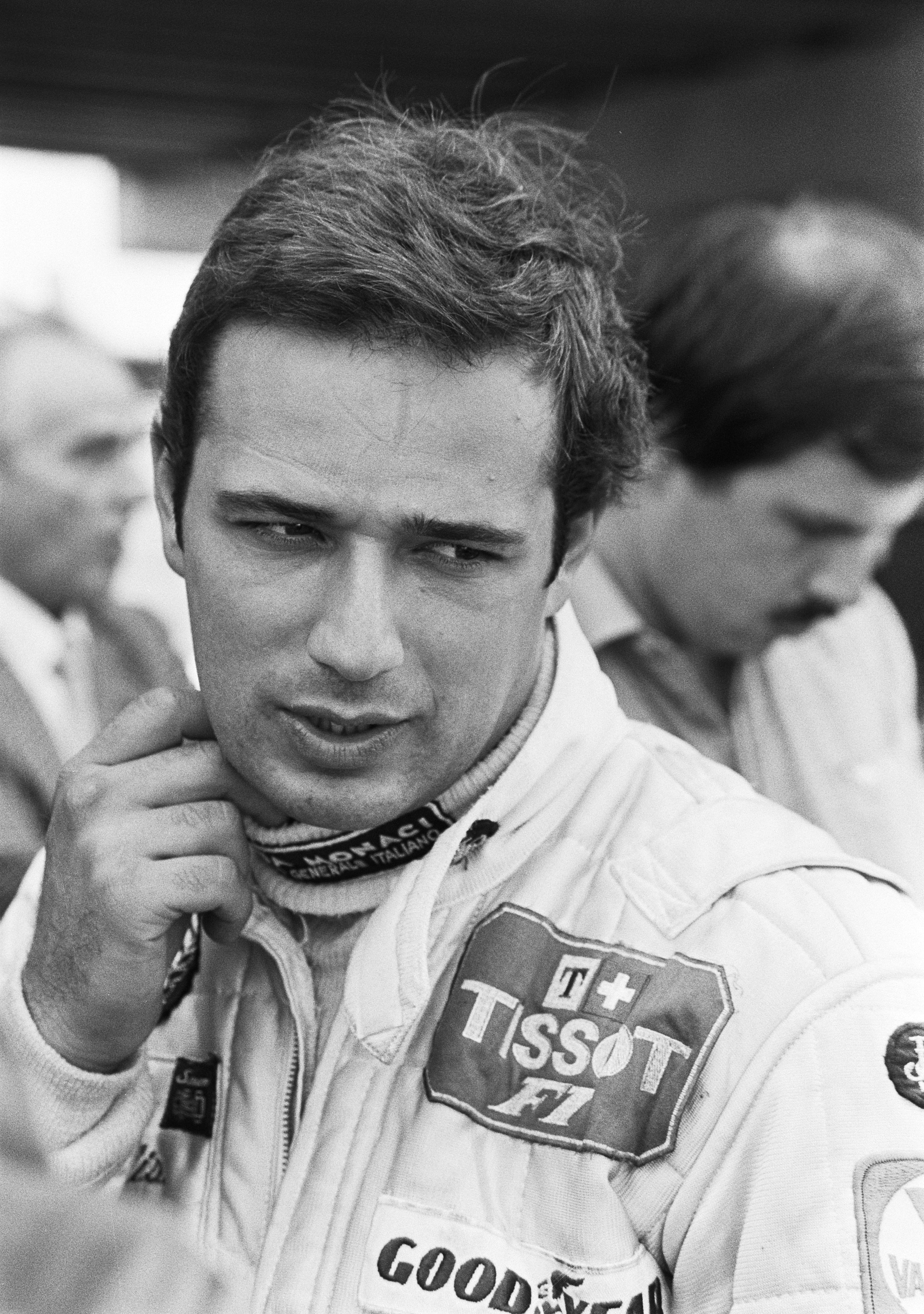
Elio De Angelis

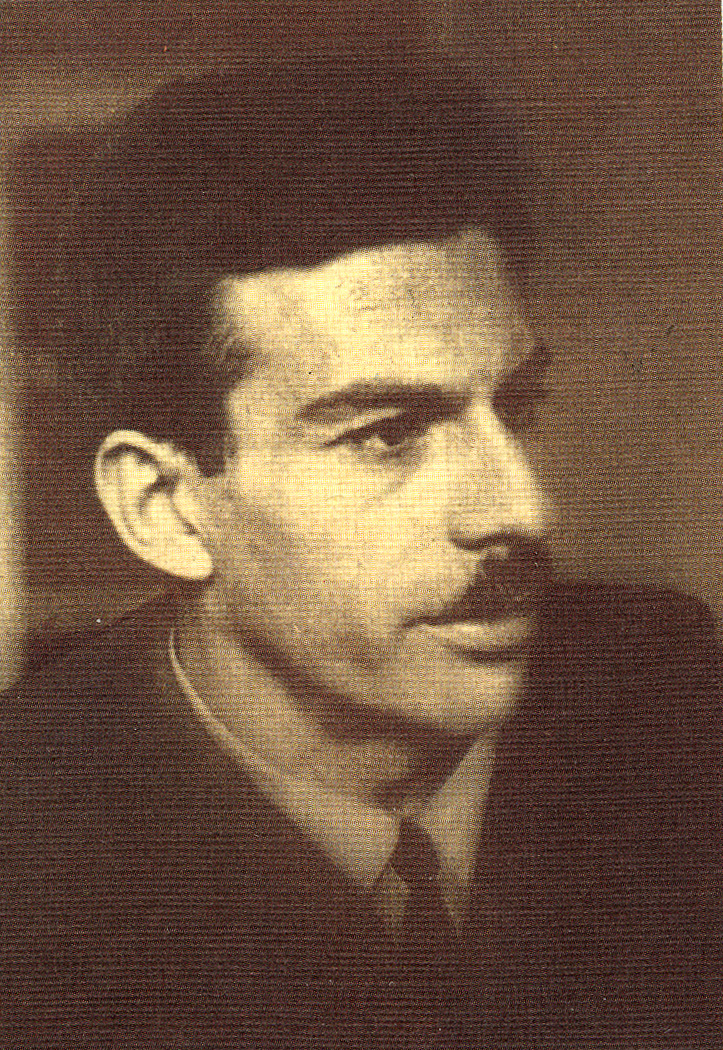
Elio Vittorini

- Elio Aggiano (born 1972), Italian cyclist
- Elio Altramura, Italian art director
- Elio Augusto Di Carlo (1918–1998), Italian ornithologist, historian and physician
- Elio Ballesi (1920–1971), Italian politician
- Elio Bartolini (1922–2006), Italian writer, screenwriter and poet
- Elio Battaglia (born 1933), Italian operatic baritone
- Elio Bavutti (1914–1987), Italian cyclist
- Stefano "Elio" Belisari (born 1961), Italian singer
- Elio Berhanyer (1929–2019), Spanish fashion designer
- Elio Bertocchi (1919–1971), Italian cyclist
- Elio Bianchi (born 1920), Italian footballer
- Elio Calderini (born 1988), Italian footballer
- Elio Capradossi (born 1996), Italian footballer
- Elio Castro (born 1988), Mexican footballer
- Elio Catola (born 1935), Italian athlete
- Elio Chacón (1936–1992), Venezuelan expatriate baseball player
- Elio Ciol (born 1929), Italian photographer and publisher
- Elio Costa (born 1940), Italian politician and magistrate
- Elio Cotena (born 1945), Italian boxer
- Elio Crovetto (1926–2000), Italian actor, comedian and television personality
- Elio Cruz (1931–2019), Gibraltarian playwright
- Elio de Angelis (1958–1986), Italian racing driver
- Elio De Anna (born 1949), Italian rugby union player and politician
- Elio De Silvestro (born 1993), Italian footballer
- Elio Di Rupo (born 1951), Belgian politician
- Elio Díaz (born 1962), Venezuelan boxer
- Elio Festa (born 1960), Italian cyclist
- Elio Filippo Accrocca (1923–1996), Italian poet, author, and translator
- Elio Fiorucci (1935–2015), Italian fashion designer
- Elio Fox, American poker player
- Elio García-Austt (1919–2005), Uruguayan neuroscientist
- Elio Gaspari (born 1944), Italian-born Brazilian writer and journalist
- Elio Gasperoni (born 1943), Sammarinese sports shooter
- Elio Germano (born 1980), Italian actor
- Elio Gerussi (1935–1988), Italian cyclist
- Elio Gnagnarelli (born 1946), Italian sports shooter competing in the Shooting at the 1984 Summer Olympics – Men's 50 metre rifle prone
- Elio Guarisco (1954–2020), Italian writer, translator and Tibetan Buddhist scholar and Dzogchen practitioner.
- Elio Gustinetti (born 1955), Italian football manager
- Elio Guzzanti (1920–2014), Italian doctor and politician
- Elio Ibarra (born 1967), Italian boxer
- Elio Juárez (born 1942), Uruguayan cyclist
- Elio Lampridio Cerva (1463–1520), Ragusan poet and humanist
- Elio Leoni Sceti, Italian businessman
- Elio Lo Cascio (born 1948), Italian historian
- Elio Locatelli (1943–2019), Italian speed skater
- Elio M. García Jr. (born 1978), Cuban-American author
- Elio Marchetti (born 1974), Italian racing driver
- Elio Martusciello (born 1959), Italian experimental music composer and performer
- Elio Mei (born 2002), American singer-songwriter
- Elio Modigliani (1860–1932), Italian anthropologist and zoologist
- Elio Mora (born 1977), Paraguayan footballer
- Elio Morille (1927–1998), Italian rower
- Elio Morpurgo (1858–1944), Italian politician
- Elio Pace (born 1968), English singer-songwriter and pianist
- Elio Pagliarani (1927–2012), Italian poet and literary critic
- Elio Pandolfi (1926–2021), Italian actor
- Elio Pecora (born 1936), Italian poet
- Elio Pecoraro (born 1967), Italian footballer
- Elio Petri (1929–1982), Italian filmmaker
- Elio Pietrini (1939–2022), Argentine-born Venezuelan actor
- Elio Ragni (1910–1998), Italian athlete
- Elio Rinero (born 1947), Italian footballer
- Elio Roca (1943–2021), Argentine singer
- Elio Rodríguez (born 1962), Uruguayan footballer
- Elio Rojas (born 1982), Dominican Republican boxer
- Elio Romani (1920–1999), Italian chess player
- Elio Sasso Sant (1911–1997), Italian canoeist
- Elio Schneeman (1961–1997), American poet
- Elio Sgreccia (1928–2019), Italian bioethicist and cardinal of the Catholic Church.
- Elio Shazivari (born 1985), Albanian footballer
- Elio Steiner (1904–1965), Italian actor
- Elio Toaff (1915–2015), Italian Orthodox Rabbi
- Elio Veltri (born 1938), Italian journalist and politician
- Elio Verde (born 1987), Italian judoka
- Elio Villafranca, Cuban jazz pianist and composer
- Elio Villate (born 1957), Cuban painter
- Elio Vito (born 1960), Italian politician
- Elio Vittorini (1908–1966), Italian writer and novelist
- Elio (Welsh-Canadian singer) (born 1998 or 1999)
- Elio Zagato (1921–2009), Italian automobile designer, entrepreneur and racing driver.
- Elio Zamuto (born 1941), Italian actor

== Fictional characters ==
- Elio Perlman, the protagonist and narrator of the 2007 novel Call Me by Your Name by André Aciman.
- Elio Solis, the titular character from the 2025 Disney-Pixar film Elio.

== Bibliography ==
- Albaigès, Josep M. (1993). Diccionario de nombres de personas. Edicions Universitat Barcelona. ISBN 84-475-0264-3.
- De Felice, Emidio (1978). Nomi d'Italia. Vol. 1. Milan: Arnoldo Mondadori Editore.
- La Stella, T. Enzo (2009). Santi e fanti - Dizionario dei nomi di persona. Bologna: Zanichelli. ISBN 978-88-08-06345-8.
- Sheard, K. M. (2011). Llewellyn's Complete Book of Names. Llewellyn Publications. ISBN 978-0-7387-2368-6.
