= 1851 in music =

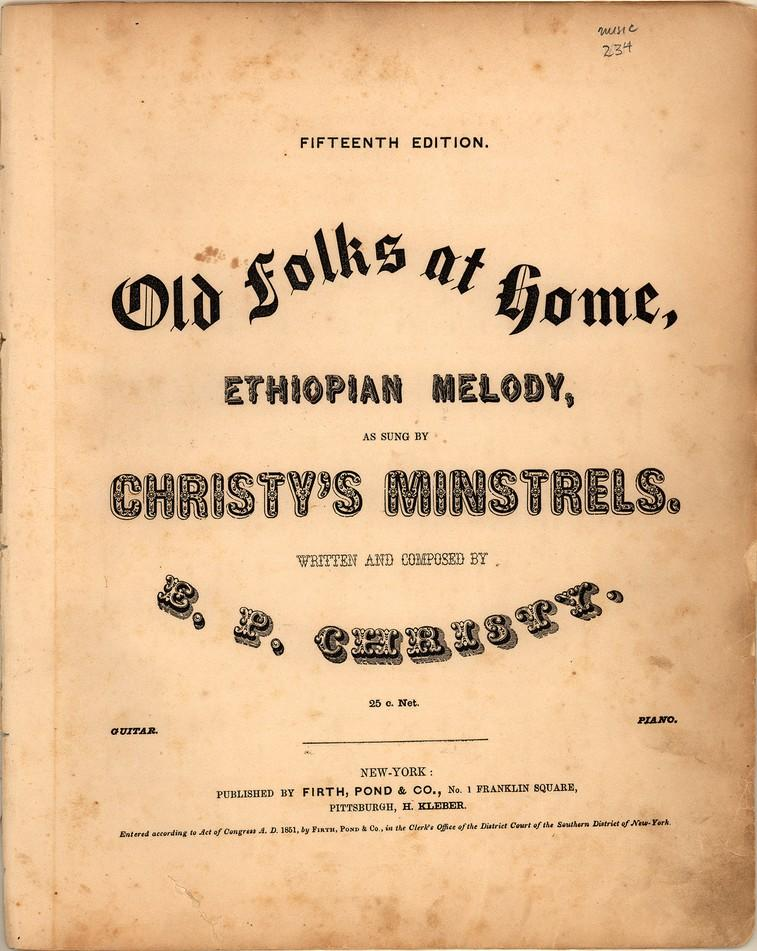
Old Folks at Home, as sung by Christy's Minstrels in 1851.

This article is about music-related events in 1851.

== Events ==
- February – Operatic tenor Sims Reeves returns to perform in Dublin with his new wife, soprano Charlotte Emma Lucombe.
- February 6 – Schumann's Symphony No. 3 receives its première in Düsseldorf, the composer conducting.
- March 11 – Giuseppe Verdi's opera Rigoletto is first performed at La Fenice in Venice.
- April 5 – Jenny Lind visits the Mammoth Cave in Kentucky, USA.
- July 23 – Richard Wagner writes down the leitmotif for the "Ride of the Valkyries".
- Operatic baritone Hans von Milde marries soprano Rosa Agthe.
- Eight-year-old Adelina Patti sings in public for the first time.

== Published popular music ==
- "Cora, the Indian Maiden's Song" – w. Shirley Brooks m. Alexander Lee
- "Old Folks at Home" (Way Down Upon the Swanee River) by Stephen Foster
- "Ring, Ring, de Banjo" by Stephen Foster
- "I Would Not Die in Summer Time" by Stephen Foster
- "Laura Lee" by Stephen Foster

== Classical music ==
- Woldemar Bargiel
  - Piano Trio No. 1 in F major, Op. 6
  - String Quartet No.3, Op.15b
- Johannes Brahms
  - Scherzo in E-flat minor for solo piano, Op. 4
  - Heimkehr (Homecoming) for voice and piano, Op. 7 No. 6
- Stephen Heller – Pensées fugitives, Op.30
- Franz Liszt
  - Transcendental Études for Piano, S 139
  - Grandes études de Paganini
- Johann Kaspar Mertz – Fantaisie über 'Don Juan', Op.28
- Jacques Offenbach – Concerto Rondo for cello and orchestra.
- George Onslow – Wind Quintet Op. 81
- Anton Rubinstein – Symphony No. 2 (Ocean) (first version)
- Robert Schumann
  - Symphony No. 4 from 1841, revised
  - Violin Sonata No. 1
  - Violin Sonata No. 2
  - Der Rose Pilgerfahrt, oratorio
  - Mädchenlieder, Op. 103
  - 7 Lieder, Op. 104
  - 6 Gesänge, Op. 107
  - Piano Trio No. 3, Op. 110
  - 3 Gedichte, Op. 119
  - Julius Cäsar Ouverture, Op. 128
  - 3 Fantasiestücke, for piano
  - Märchenbilder, for piano and viola
- Adrien-François Servais
  - Souvenir de la Suisse, Op.10
  - 6 Caprices for Cello, Op.11
- Hugo Staehle – 6 Lieder, Op.2

== Opera ==
- Félicien-César David – La perle du Brésill
- Charles Gounod – Sapho
- Albert Lortzing – Die Oprnprobe
- Joachim Raff – König Alfred
- Giuseppe Verdi – Rigoletto

== Births ==
- January 25 – Jan Blockx, pianist, composer and music teacher (d. 1912)
- January 27 – Gaspar Villate, composer (d. 1891)
- February 12 – Anna Yesipova, pianist (d. 1914)
- March 27
  - Ruperto Chapí, composer (d. 1909)
  - Vincent d'Indy, composer (d. 1931)
- May 1 – Ludvig Hegner, composer (d. 1923)
- May 6
  - Aristide Bruant, French singer (d. 1925)
  - Jean-Alexandre Talazac, operatic tenor (d. 1896)
- May 7 – Julius Buths, pianist, conductor and composer (d. 1920)
- May 17 – Victor Bendix, pianist, conductor and composer (d. 1926)
- June 3 – Theodore Baker, musicologist (died 1934)
- June 11 – Oscar Borg, composer (d. 1930)
- June 12 – Pol Plançon, operatic bass (d. 1914)
- August 8 – Walborg Lagerwall, Swedish violinist (d. 1940)
- October 11 – Josif Marinković, composer (d. 1931)
- October 16 – Viggo Bielefeldt, composer (d. 1909)
- November 5 – Émile Pierre Ratez, composer (d. 1934)
- November 16 – Minnie Hauk, operatic soprano (d. 1929)
- probable – Marie Heilbron, operatic soprano (d. 1886)

== Deaths ==
- January 21 – Albert Lortzing, composer (b. 1801)
- January 24 – Gaspare Spontini, composer (b. 1774)
- February 20 – Josef Alois Ladurner, Austrian composer and pedagogue (b. 1769)
- March 6
  - Alexander Alyabyev, composer (b. 1787)
  - Emma Hartmann, composer (b. 1807)
- April 8 – John Parry (Bardd Alaw), harpist and composer (b. 1776)
- July 4 – Martin-Joseph Mengal, composer (b. 1784)
- July 17 – Béni Egressy, composer and librettist (b. 1814)
- August 8 – James Shudi Broadwood, piano-maker (b. 1772)
- October 8 – George Alexander Lee, singer, songwriter and opera producer (b. 1802)
- December 1 – Carl Dahlén, ballet dancer and choreographer (b. 1770)
