= Elio (disambiguation) =

Elio is an Italian masculine given name.

Elio may also refer to:

== People ==
- Elio (Italian singer) (born 1961), Italian singer, real name Stefano Belisari
- Elio (Welsh-Canadian singer) (born 1998), Welsh-Canadian singer, real name Charlotte Lee
- Bernardo Elío y Elío (1867–1937), Spanish aristocrat and politician
- María Luisa Elío (1926–2009), Spanish writer and actress
- Francisco Javier de Elío (1767–1822), Spanish military officer

== Other uses ==
- Elio Motors, an American startup automaker
- Elio (film), a 2025 animated film from Pixar and Disney, that released on June 20, 2025

== See also ==
- Hélio
- Helio (disambiguation)
- Ilio, a breed of dog
- Elios (disambiguation)
