= Campinas Brazil Temple =

LDS Temple in Campinas, São Paulo

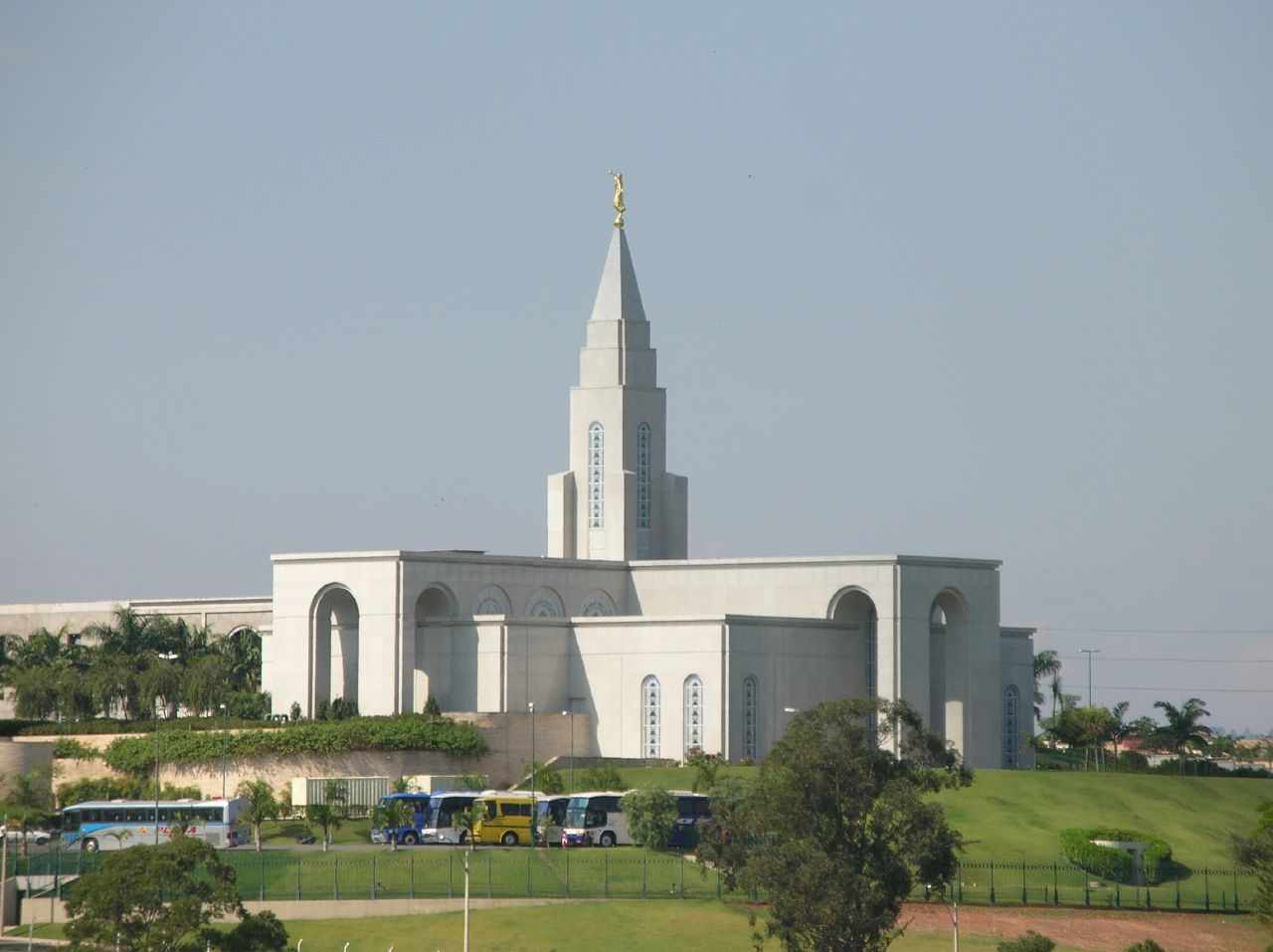
- Interactive map of Campinas Brazil Temple
- Number: 111
- Dedication: 17 May 2002, by Gordon B. Hinckley
- Site: 6.18 acres (2.50 ha)
- Floor area: 49,100 ft^{2} (4,560 m^{2})
- Official website • News & images

Church chronology
← Monterrey Mexico Temple	Campinas Brazil Temple	→ Asunción Paraguay Temple

Additional information
- Announced: 3 April 1997, by Gordon B. Hinckley
- Groundbreaking: 1 May 1998, by James E. Faust
- Open house: 20 April – 11 May 2002
- Current president: Flavio Cooper
- Designed by: JCL Arquitetos Ltd., and Church A&E Services
- Location: Campinas, Brazil
- Coordinates: 22°53′47.52239″S 47°0′4.078800″W
- Exterior finish: Light gray Asa Branca granite from the state of Ceara
- Design: Classic modern, single-spire design
- Baptistries: 1
- Ordinance rooms: 4 (two-stage progressive)
- Sealing rooms: 3
- Clothing rental: Yes

The Campinas Brazil Temple is a temple of the Church of Jesus Christ of Latter-day Saints in Campinas, São Paulo, Brazil. The intent to build the temple was announced on April 5, 1997, by church president Gordon B. Hinckley during general conference. It is the fourth in Brazil, the second in the state of São Paulo, and the church's 111th operating temple worldwide. The temple is on a 6.18-acre hillside site that is visible from many parts of the city. A groundbreaking ceremony was held on May 1, 1998, conducted by James E. Faust, second counselor in the First Presidency. The temple uses a classic modern design with light gray Asa Branca granite from the state of Ceará. The street on which the temple sits was renamed in honor of Faust, who served as a missionary for the church in Brazil in the 1940s. Construction was delayed by local political unrest, including the assassination of Campinas Mayor Antônio da Costa Santos. After construction was completed, approximately 75,000 people attended a public open house. The temple was dedicated on May 17, 2002, by Hinckley with four sessions held.

== History ==
The Campinas Brazil Temple was announced on April 3, 1997, by church president Hinckley.

Early missionary Wayne M. Beck demonstrated his confidence in the local members by donating the first $20 for a temple in Campinas in 1946, 51 years before the temple was announced. Members from the Campinas area responded quickly with donations after the announcement. One donation came from an eight-year-old boy who worked to earn $100 to help with construction. Faust noted that both the boy and a man who donated one million dollars on the same day would be equally blessed for their faithfulness, regardless of the size of their donation.

The groundbreaking ceremony took place on May 1, 1998, presided over by Faust, second counselor in the First Presidency, who was accompanied by Joseph B. Wirthlin of the Quorum of the Twelve Apostles.] More than 3,000 people attended the ceremony. W. Craig Zwick, president of the Brazil Area, remarked that it was heartwarming to see about 50 buses that had been used to transport people to the hillside location, describing the experience as feeling "Pentecostal." For Faust, the groundbreaking was particularly meaningful as he had served as a missionary in Brazil from 1939 to 1942.

Construction was delayed by local political unrest and violence, including the assassination of Mayor Antônio da Costa Santos, who had expressed excitement about the temple's construction. His successor, Izalene Tiene, visited the temple on the first day of the open house and was so impressed by the tour that she requested permission to visit the temple grounds from time to time as a place to have peace and reflect.

The temple was completed with a total floor area of 49,100 square feet. A public open house was held from April 20 to May 11, 2002, excluding Sundays. Approximately 75,000 visitors attended the open house over the course of the three and a half weeks. Members contributed to the construction and hosted the open house. Flavio Cooper, an area seventy, was interviewed on Globo Television station, one of the two most popular stations in the state, and the interview was credited with heightening interest in the open house. Approximately 3,000 people requested information and visits from missionaries after the open house.

The Campinas Brazil Temple was dedicated on May 17, 2002, by Hinckley in four sessions. He was accompanied by Faust.

The dedication was a culminating spiritual experience for longtime Campinas members such as Edmer Tobias, widow of Nei Tobias Garcia, the first president of the Campinas stake. Wayne M. Beck, the early missionary who had donated the first $20 for a temple in Campinas in 1946, attended the first dedicatory session with two of his sons.

In 2008, the mayor of Campinas, Hélio de Oliveira Santos, visited the temple to dedicate the street on the north side of the temple as "Rua James Esdras Faust," after James E. Faust. The renaming was proposed by Luiz Yabiku, a city council member of Campinas and a church member. Faust's love and connections to Brazil including receiving the honorary title of "Citizen of São Paulo" in the city council chambers in 1998, an honor shared only by Pope John Paul II and the Dalai Lama.

In 2018, the temple underwent refurbishment and adaptations, including civil services and installations in the lodging and baptistry areas, as well as the cafeteria, kitchen, changing rooms, hallways, and restrooms. The work included demolition services, masonry, ceramic coating, lining, painting, waterproofing, interlock paving, wood frames, electrical and hydraulic installations, fire prevention and firefighting, and HVAC systems.

== Design and architecture ==
The Campinas Brazil Temple was designed by JCL Arquitetos Ltd. and church employees, using a classic modern design. The temple sits on a 6.18-acre plot on a hillside overlooking the city of Campinas. On its hillside location, the temple is visible from many parts of the city of Campinas, which has a population of over two million. A circular fountain is in the building's front area.

The structure has dimensions of 142 feet by 163 feet, and has light gray Asa Branca granite from the state of Ceará. It has tall arches before the entrance and around the windows. A rectangular spire on a square base sits on the top center of the building, with an arched window on each of the four sides, and the spire has an angel Moroni statue on top.

The temple has four instruction rooms, three sealing rooms, and a baptistry.

== Cultural and community impact ==
The temple construction was delayed by local political unrest and violence, including the assassination of Mayor Antônio da Costa Santos, who had expressed excitement about the temple's construction. His successor as mayor, Izalene Tiene, visited the temple on the first day of the open house and was so impressed by the tour that she requested permission to visit the temple grounds from time to time as a place to have peace and reflect.

Early missionary Wayne M. Beck, who served in Campinas and later as president of the São Paulo Brazil Temple, attended the first dedicatory session and praised the Brazilian members' strength and self-sufficiency. The temple open house had 75,000 visitors during its three and a half weeks

In 2008, the street on which the temple sits was officially renamed "Rua James Esdras Faust" in honor of James E. Faust. Mayor Santos emphasized the importance of the family in finding solutions for society's problems during the street dedication ceremony. The mayor received a marble statue symbolizing strong family ties, a Tabernacle Choir CD, and a booklet about the purpose of temples.

== Temple leadership and admittance ==
The church's temples are directed by a temple president and matron, each typically serving for a term of three years. The president and matron oversee the administration of temple operations and provide guidance and training for both temple patrons and staff.

Serving from 2002 to 2005, Sadayosi Ichi was the first president, with Eponina I. Ichi serving as matron. As of 2025, Flávio Cooper is the president, with Maria L. Cooper serving as matron.

=== Admittance ===
Following construction, a public open house was held from April 20 to May 11, 2002, excluding Sundays. Like all the church's temples, it is not used for Sunday worship services. To members of the church, temples are regarded as sacred houses of the Lord. Once dedicated, only church members with a current temple recommend can enter for worship.

== See also ==
- Comparison of temples of The Church of Jesus Christ of Latter-day Saints
- List of temples of The Church of Jesus Christ of Latter-day Saints
- List of temples of The Church of Jesus Christ of Latter-day Saints by geographic region
- Temple architecture (Latter-day Saints)
- The Church of Jesus Christ of Latter-day Saints in Brazil
