= Villate (surname) =

Villate is a surname. Notable people with the surname include:

- Blas Villate (1824–1882), Spanish general
- Elio Villate (born 1957), Cuban painter
- Gaspar Villate (1851–1891), Cuban composer
- Juan Sebastián Villate (born 1991), Colombian footballer
