= Playhouse, Sleaford =

Theatre in Sleaford, Lincolnshire England

Coordinates: 52°59′57.6″N 0°24′48.6″W

The Playhouse
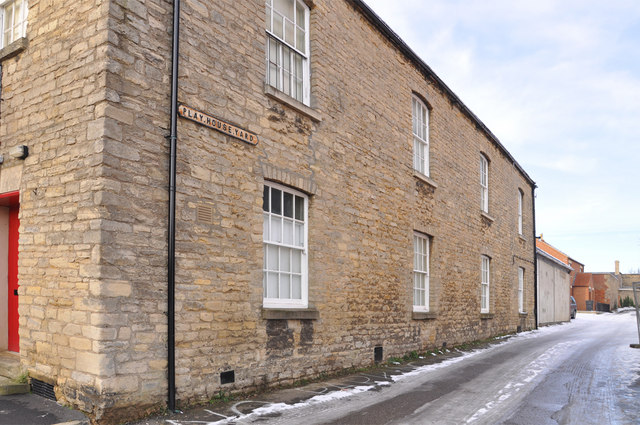
- Playhouse Yard, with the Playhouse entrance the red door on the left
- Interactive map of The Playhouse
- Address: 54 Westgate, Sleaford, NG34 7PP; England
- Owner: Sleaford Little Theatre CIO
- Current use: community theatre and arts centre

Construction
- Opened: 1825
- Reopened: 2000

Website
- www.sleafordplayhouse.co.uk

The Playhouse is a theatre in Sleaford, Lincolnshire, England. It is a Grade II listed Georgian building dating from 1820. The building became a school in the 1850s, and after serving several other purposes reopened as a theatre in 2000.

== History ==
The Grade II listed Playhouse started life as a theatre and was built for Joseph Close Smedley (1784–1863) manager of a number of theatres in Lincolnshire and the surrounding counties. His first visit to Sleaford was about 1814. He had trained as a lawyer. In May 1803 whilst they were members of Thomas Shaftoe Robertson's Lincoln company he had married the actress Melinda Bullen (1781–1870) in the actors' church of St.Peter Mancroft in Norwich. They had at least nine children, Melinda, Anna and Joseph joined them on stage or in the theatre. Some of the other towns on the circuit included at various times Alford, Bourne, Caistor, Folkingham, Grimsby, Holbeach, Holden, March (also built for him), Melton Mowbray, Mildenhall, Southwell and Upwell. At least one earlier theatre existed in Sleaford, before Smedley had even visited the town, Mr.J. Sims brought a company in November 1806 to open the theatre on 1 December with The Soldier's Daughter and The Wags of Windsor.

Mr Smedley announced the opening of the 1826 season at the New Theatre on Monday 26 March 1826 with the Comedy of Speed the Plough and My Spouse and I. Days of Playing, Monday, Wednesday & Friday.

The 1827 season opened for a fortnight on Monday 16 April with the comedy A Bold Stroke for a Husband and The Forty Thieves, Paul Pry and The Liar on Wednesday, and Romeo and Juliet with Return'd Killed on Friday.

The newspaper report for the April start of the 1828 season stated "It is nearly 14 years since Mr. Smedley first managed the theatre in this town".

The Stamford Mercury of Friday 20 May 1836 carried an advert.

THEATRE, SLEAFORD.— For Three Weeks only. On Saturday Evening, May 21st, at Half-price (for that night only), GEORGE BARNWELL, and the SPECTRE BRIDEGROOM. On Monday Evening, May 23d, The VAMPIRE, THREE PAIR of LOVERS, and NEIGHBOURS and their WIVES. On Wednesday Evening, May 25th, for the benefit of Mr Smedley, The GREEN MAN, IS HE JEALOUS?, and HUNTING a TURTLE. Days of Playing, Monday, Wednesday, Friday, and Saturday.
By Desire of the young gentlemen of the Grammar School, The Merchant of Venice and Turning the Tables were performed on the 27th, and on the 28th by Desire of H.Handley, MP., Wives as they Were and Maids as they Are with Simpson and Co.

As well as plays, theatres were the venues for operas, concerts and other entertainments, in order to remain viable. An advert in the Stamford Mercury of Friday 24 May 1839, is an example of this:

THEATRE, SLEAFORD. For Three Nights only, in their way to Grantham. MONS. TESTOT and Mons. DE COUR have the honour to inform the nobility and gentry of Sleaford that they intend exhibiting in that town their extraordinary Magical Illusions, Cabalistic Mirror, Feats of Strength, Balancing, and the Dancing of the Dinner Plates. The whole of the performance has astonished and delighted all persons who bave seen it. The nights of performance in Sleaford will be Monday the 27th, Wednesday the 29th, and Friday the 31st of May, 1839.

In June the theatre hosted the Sleaford Tee-Total Festival.

In January 1840, Joseph Smedley, comedian, was licensed to open the theatre, Sleaford for a period not exceeding sixty nights.

A newspaper announced a short season and lighting by Gas:

MR. SMEDLEY respectfully informs his friends that he purposes commencing a very short Season on Monday (being the Fair) April 20, 1840, with an entirely new Company, who will perform the IDIOT HEIRESS, and BLUE BEARD on Wednesday, NICHOLAS NICKLEBY with ROSINA; and on Saturday the 25th. Performances that will be announced in the bills of the day, under the Patronage of H. Handley, Esq., M.P. — The Theatre (for the first time) will be brilliantly lighted with Gas.

Later after his retirement Smedley became a printer and bookseller, and joined with others to lease the gasworks and his son George was a manager. In 1841 after the theatre was sold, John Hyde, a silversmith, advertised it for let. By the end of the year it was announced in the press prior to an auction of paper hangings.

The Theatre has been recently fitted as an Auction Mart, by constructing substantial floor over the pit, level with the stage and floor of the boxes. The boxes, which are easy of access, can be occupied by the company without any inconvenience. Person will be engaged to hand round the respective lots, affording every facility for their inspection.

In January 1842 the Mosley & Abbott company opened the theatre after playing at Gainsborough. The performers included Mr. Barnardo Eagle, the 'Great Wizard of the South' presenting magic shows.

In January the following year the company brought a company and the singer Miss E. Land to perform for a limited season. In February, Mr. Fitzgerald the imitator of Mr. Carles Matthews attracted a numerous attendance.

In July 1844 the Sleaford Temperance Annual Tea Festival was held at the theatre. In the October Harriet Waylett 'the Queen of the English ballad, accompanied by Mr. George Alexander Lee and Mr J. W. Hammond gave a concert to a well attended house.

1845 brought a lecture on 'The physiological effects of alcohol on the body' by R.B. Grindrod, LL.D., and later another magician to the stage, Mr. Jacobs, the great Original Wizard, on 24 January. In July the property was to be sold by auction at the Bristol Arms inn on 7 August. The lower part is occupied as four tenements, the upper part is still fitted-up and furnished as a theatre, with offices, yard, piggeries etc. The whole is described as 'in an excellent condition'. Performances by the Lancashire bell-ringers met with very poor encouragement in October.

John Hyde is again advertising the theatre to be let in November, 1847. Mr.Jacobs returned for a spell on 21 December.

The 1849 season opened on 5 November under the direction of Mr. Kinnear, among the company Mesdames Kate Palmer, Doyle, Bland and Melville, Messrs. Pennet, Holsten, Shaw, Watson, Nash, Wolfenden, Miller and Pascal. In January 1852 a company under Mr Young of Woolwich had a very poor season and left without settling debts. In February, 1853 the theatre performances are reported well attended, under the management of Miss Faulkland.

The theatre was later taken over by Jane Hill and William Pidd-Fischer in 1853. Mr. Waldron applied for a licence to open the theatre in April. The attendance at the theatre was reported as 'very indifferent during the past week' in May, 1854. In May, the theatre was reopened under the management of Mr. R.A. Douglas for several weeks, the attendance reported as 'miserably small'. In 1855, despite these attempts to re-open it as a theatre, the building was sold to Thomas Parry who in turn sold the building to the Church of England. Through a variety of donations and grants it was converted into the town's first infant school by local builders Parry and William Kirk, at a cost of £1,085.

Prior to it being restored and re-opened as a theatre in 2000 it had been used as a benefits office and library.
