= Waylett =

Waylett is a surname. Notable people with the surname include:

- Harriet Waylett (1798–1851), English actress and theatre manager
- Jamie Waylett (born 1989), British actor

== See also ==
- Dunton Wayletts, hamlet in Essex
