= Helio =

Helio may refer to:

- Helio AU-24 Stallion
- Helio (wireless carrier), a defunct American wireless communications provider (2005–2010); originally a joint venture between SK Telecom and EarthLink, purchased by Virgin Mobile USA in 2008
- Helio (Cambridge Glass), a short-lived glassware range
- Helio Aircraft Company, an aircraft manufacturing company
- Helio Courier, a light C/STOL utility aircraft designed in 1949

== Technology ==
- Helio, a series of mobile CPU and GPU developed by MediaTek.

== People ==
- Helio Castro (born 1917), Salvadoran former sports shooter.
- Helio Fallas Venegas (born 1947), Costa Rica economist and politician.
- Helio Gallardo, Chilean Philosopher and Professor of the University of Costa Rica.
- Helio Koa'eloa (ca. 1815–1846), Hawaiian Catholic lay missionary.
- Helio Vera (1946–2008), Paraguayan writer, lawyer and journalist.

== See also ==
- Hélio, a surname (including a list of people with the name)
- Helios (disambiguation)
- Elio (disambiguation)
- Heliocentrism
