= Helios 2 =

Helios 2 may refer to:

- Helios (spacecraft), the 1976 German-American Helios 2 space probe
- Helios 2 (satellite), the 2004 European Helios 2 military satellites

== See also ==
- Helios (disambiguation)
