= Caterina Vertova =

Italian actress (born 1960)

- Born: July 19, 1960 (age 65); Milan, Italy
- Occupation: Actress
- Years active: 1979–present
- Notable work: Ginger and Fred; Sacred Heart

Caterina Vertova (born July 19, 1960, in Milan) is an Italian actress. She studied in London and in Paris, as well as at the Actors Studio in New York City.

== Roles ==
=== Stage ===
- Ghosts, by Henrik Ibsen (1985) Beppe Navello, (1985)
- Macbeth, by William Shakespeare directed by Cosimo Cinieri
- Lettere persiane, by Montesquieu directed by Maurizio Scaparro (1986)
- La grande magia, by Eduardo De Filippo directed by Giorgio Strehler
- Il ratto di Proserpina, by Pier Maria Rosso di San Secondo directed by Guido De Monticelli
- The dooms they walk, by Elio Pecora directed by Marco Carniti
- La valigia, directed by Antonio Salines (1987)
- La morte di Empedocle, by Friedrich Höderlin directed by Cesare Lievi
- La coscienza di Zeno, by Italo Svevo directed by Egisto Marcucci (1988)
- Le tre sorelle, by Anton Cechov directed by Peter Hatkins
- Oblomov, by Ivan Goncharov directed by Beppe Navello
- Tempo di uccidere, by Ennio Flaiano directed by Alvaro Piccardi (1989)
- La vita che ti diedi by Luigi Pirandello directed by Luigi Squarzina
- La famiglia del Santolo, by Giacinto Gallina directed by Luigi Squarzina
- Il Vittoriale degli Italiani, by Tullio Kezich directed by Mario Missiroli (1990)
- Elettra, by Giuseppe Manfridi directed by Giorgio Treves
- Lulù, by Frank Wedekind directed by Mario Missiroli (1991)
- La grande magia, by Eduardo De Filippo directed by Giorgio Strehler (1992)
- La strega, by Nicolaj Koliada directed by Renato Giordano
- Filax Anghelos, by Renato Sarti directed by Marco Carniti
- La lunga notte di Medea, by Corrado Alvaro directed by Marco Carniti
- Come tu mi vuoi, by Luigi Pirandello directed by Giorgio Strehler
- La vita reale di Jakob Geherda, by Bertold Brecht directed by Rita Tamburi (1993)
- La vita che ti diedi, by Luigi Pirandello directed by Luigi Squarzina (1994)
- Sogno di un mattino di primavera, by Gabriele D'Annunzio directed by Rita Tamburi (1995)
- Controcanto al chiuso, by Biancamaria Frabotta directed by Rita Tamburi
- La lunga notte di Medea, by Corrado Alvaro directed by Alvaro Piccardi
- Didone, by Giuseppe Manfridi directed by Walter Manfrè (1996)
- Le confessioni, by Walter Manfrè directed by Walter Manfrè (1998)
- Sappho, by Franz Grillparzer directed by Marco Carniti (1999)
- Nessuno è perfetto, by Simon Williams directed by Alvaro Piccardi (2000)
- Gerusalemme: tre donne per un Dio solo, by Paolo Puppa directed by Alvaro Piccardi (2002)
- La figlia di Iorio, by Gabriele D'Annunzio directed by Massimo Belli
- La fiaccola sotto il moggio, by Gabriele D'Annunzio directed by Massimo Belli (2003)
- Metti una sera a cena, by Giuseppe Patroni Griffi directed by Giuseppe Patroni Griffi
- Conversazione in Sicilia, by Elio Vittorini directed by Walter Manfrè (2004)
- La donna vestita di sole, by Davide Cavuti directed by Davide Cavuti
- Interrogatorio a Maria, by Giovanni Testori directed by Walter Manfrè (2005)
- Medea, by Lucio Anneo Seneca directed by Alberto Gagnarli (2006)
- Anita, by Diego Gullo directed by Giuseppe Dipasquale (2007)
- La Notte delle Donne (2008)
- Tango or not (2008)
- A Midsummer Night's Dream (2009)
- Mia figlia vuole portare il velo, by Sabina Negri, directed by Lorenzo Loris (2011)

=== Filmography ===
- Ginger and Fred, directed by Federico Fellini (1986)
- La donna del re, directed by Axel Corti (1990)
- Il macellaio, directed by Aurelio Grimaldi (1998)
- Lucrezia Borgia, directed by Florestano Vancini (2002)
- Chiamami Salomè, directed by Claudio Sestieri (2005)
- Natale a Miami, directed by Neri Parenti (2005)
- Sacred Heart, directed by Ferzan Özpetek (2005)
- Ho voglia di te, directed by Luis Prieto (2006)
- La canarina assassinata, directed by Daniele Cascella (2007)

== Awards ==
- 1994 Premio Fondi La Pastora
- 1999 Premio Internazionale della Fotografia Cinematografica Gianni di Venanzo
- 1999 Premio Letterario Pisa
- 1999 Premio “Nuovo Gange”
- 1999 Premio Civitas Pozzuoli
- 2000 Premio Arte e Cultura E. Petrolini
- 2001 Premio Oscar del Successo della Provincia di Alessandria
- 2003 Premio PalcoCinema Randone
- 2005 Premio “Civitas” alla carriera
- 2006 Premio Acqui Terme della Regione Piemonte alla carriera
- 2007 Premio Roma Arte alla carriera
- 2008 Premio Gassman
- 2008 Premio “Festival Cinematografico delle Cerase”
- 2008 Premio “Veneri di Parabita” alla carriera"
- 2009 Premio “Pericle d'Oro”
- 2009 Premio “Attrice dell'anno” Associazione Laureati Università Bocconi
- 2010 Premio V Sicilian Film Festival Miami Beach as "Best Actress"
- 2010 Premio Città di Fiumicino “Contro tutte le mafie”
- 2010 Premio Alabarda d'oro
- 2011 Corona d'Alloro Europclub Regione Siciliana per l'arte
- 2012 Premio "Paviadonna" Fedeltà al Lavoro
