= Pekurár =

Pekurár is a Hungarian name, derived from Latin pecurarius, from pecoris, "flock", a derivation of pecus, "sheep". It is a cognate of the standard Italian word for shepherd "pecoraio", as well as a Romanian word for shepherd "păcurar".

== See also ==
- Pecoraro (disambiguation)
