= Pecoraro =

Pecoraro is an Italian family name, derived from Latin pecurarius, "shepherd", from pecoris, "flock", a derivation of pecus , "sheep". It is a cognate of the standard Italian word for shepherd "pecoraio" , as well as, a Romanian word for shepherd "păcurar" .

== People ==
- Alfonso Pecoraro Scanio (born 1959), Italian politician
- Charlie Pecoraro (born 1980), American actor
- Elio Pecoraro (born 1967), Italian football player
- Francesco Pecoraro (born 1945), Italian novelist, architect, and poet
- Joey Pecoraro, American musician and record producer
- Miguel Ángel Pecoraro, former Argentine footballer
- Nino Pecoraro (1899-1973), Italian spiritualist medium
- Rocco Pecoraro (born 1970), Italian rower
- Susú Pecoraro (born 1952), Argentine actress
- Vincent L. Pecoraro, professor at the University of Michigan

== See also ==
- Pecorara, Italy
- Pastor (surname)
