= Hélio =

Hélio is a Portuguese given name:

- Hélio (footballer) (born 1986), Brazil-born Hong Kong footballer Hélio José de Souza Gonçalves
- Helio Alves (born 1966), is a jazz pianist and son of pianists
- Helio André (born 1992), Angola footballer
- Helio Batista (footballer, born 1973), Brazilian footballer
- Hélio Batista (footballer, born 1990), Brazilian footballer
- Hélio Bicudo (1922–2018), Brazilian jurist and politician
- Hélio Ferraz de Almeida Camargo (1922–2006), Brazilian zoologist and lawyer
- Hélio Castroneves (born 1975), Brazilian auto racing driver
- Hélio Cruz (born 1993), Portuguese footballer
- Hélio Delmiro (1947–2025), Brazilian guitar player and composer
- Hélio Dias (born 1943), Brazilian former football goalkeeper
- Hélio Garcia (1931–2016), Brazilian lawyer and politician
- Hélio Gomes (born 1984), Portuguese athlete
- Hélio Gonçalves Heleno (1935–2012), Roman Catholic bishop
- Hélio Gracie (1913–2009), a founder of Brazilian Jiu-Jitsu
- Hélio Gueiros (1925–2011), Brazilian politician
- Hélio José (born 1960), Brazilian politician
- Hélio Justino (born 1972), Brazilian handballer
- Hélio Fernando Barbosa Lopes (born 1969), Brazilian politician and military officer
- Hélio Marques Pereira (1925–1971), Brazilian basketball player
- Helio Melo (born 1968), American politician
- Hélio José Muniz Filho (1977–2001), Brazilian vigilante murderer
- Hélio Oiticica (1937–1980), Brazilian visual artist, sculptor, painter, performance artist, and theorist
- Hélio Lourenço de Oliveira (1917–1985), Brazilian physician and academic
- Helio Pereira (born 1980), Brazilian footballer
- Hélio Gelli Pereira (1918–1994), Brazilian-British virologist
- Hélio Pestana (born 1985), Portuguese actor and model
- Hélio Pinto (born 1984), Portuguese footballer
- Hélio Quaglia Barbosa (1941–2008), Brazilian judge
- Helio R. Camargo (1926–2024), Brazilian general authority of the Church of Jesus Christ of Latter-day Saints (LDS Church)
- Hélio Roque (born 1985), Portuguese footballer
- Hélio Rosas (1929–2022), Brazilian politician
- Hélio Rubens Garcia (born 1940), Brazilian former basketball player and coach
- Hélio de Oliveira Santos (born 1950), Brazilian physician and politician
- Hélio Silva (swimmer) (1926–2006), Brazilian Olympic backstroke swimmer
- Hélio da Silva (1923–1987), Brazilian Olympic sprinter
- Hélio Sousa (born 1969), Portuguese footballer
- Hélio Vaz (born 1990), Portuguese footballer
- Hélio Viana, Brazilian businessman and CEO of World Sports Business and HBusiness Bank
- Helio Vieira (1914–2003), Brazilian fencer
- Hélio Waldman Brazilian scientist

== See also ==
- Helio (disambiguation)
- Helios (disambiguation)
