= Schneeman =

Schneeman is a surname. Notable people with the surname include:

- Charles Schneeman (1912–1972), American illustrator of science fiction
- Elio Schneeman (1961–1997), American poet
- George Schneeman (1934–2009), American painter
- Thomas Brennan Schneeman (born 1994), a.k.a. Tommy Brennan, American stand-up comedian

== See also ==
- Schneemann, another surname
