= Ginger and Fred =

1986 film by Federico Fellini

- Italian theatrical release poster
- Italian: Ginger e Fred
- Directed by: Federico Fellini
- Screenplay by: Federico Fellini; Tonino Guerra; Tullio Pinelli
- Story by: Federico Fellini; Tonino Guerra
- Produced by: Alberto Grimaldi; Heinz Bibo
- Starring: Marcello Mastroianni; Giulietta Masina
- Cinematography: Tonino Delli Colli; Ennio Guarnieri
- Edited by: Ruggero Mastroianni
- Music by: Nicola Piovani; Irving Berlin; Jerome Kern; Lorenz Hart
- Production companies: Produzioni Europee Associati (PEA); Les Films Ariane; France 3 Cinéma; Revcom Films; Stella Film; Rai 1; Anthea Film
- Distributed by: Istituto Luce-Italnoleggio Cinematografico (Italy); MGM/UA Entertainment Co. (USA); Acteurs Auteurs Associés (France); Tobis (West Germany)
- Release dates: 13 January 1986 (Paris); 22 January 1986 (France and Italy); 20 February 1986 (West Germany)
- Running time: 125 minutes
- Countries: Italy; France; West Germany
- Languages: Italian; English
- Box office: $837,623

Ginger and Fred (Italian: Ginger e Fred) is a 1986 comedy-drama film written and directed by Federico Fellini and starring Marcello Mastroianni and Giulietta Masina.

The title is a reference to the American dancing couple Fred Astaire and Ginger Rogers. The two leads portray Italian impersonators of Astaire and Rogers who reunite after thirty years of retirement for a vulgar and bizarre television extravaganza.

The film was the subject of a trademark claim in the United States by Ginger Rogers, who claimed in Rogers v. Grimaldi that the film violated her Lanham Act trademark rights, right of publicity, and was a "false light" defamation. The Second Circuit rejected this claim, finding that "suppressing an artistically relevant though ambiguous[ly] title[d] film" on trademark grounds would "unduly restrict expression."

== Plot ==
Amelia Bonetti, whose stage name is "Ginger", and Pippo Botticella, whose stage name is "Fred", were a famous dancing team known for imitating Ginger Rogers' and Fred Astaire's dance routines, and have retired for close to thirty years. They have been chosen for a televised reunion on a Christmas special for the variety show We Are Proud to Present.

Amelia, now a widowed grandmother, accepts as another moment in the limelight while Pippo needs the money. As she waits for Pippo to arrive, she dines with a transvestite who has a divination for visiting men in prison. She returns to her hotel room, and as she tries to sleep, she eventually learns Pippo has arrived. The next morning, they board a bus in destination to the television studio, along with a lineup of various acts including a troupe of bolero-dancing midgets, a plastic surgeon, and a couple who tape-records ghost voices.

Amelia and Pippo arrive at the studio where they do their dance rehearsal and have their makeup and hairstyling done. As they wait in the wings, various guests appear on the special, including the transvestite, a man who has left the monastery and proposes to his fiancée, a manufacturer of edible underwear, and a miracle-performing monk. When Amelia and Pippo begin their number, the television station experiences a blackout. During the outage, Pippo confesses he was institutionalized for a mental breakdown after they had broken up. They accept the outage as a bad omen and attempt to sneak out, but the lights return before they do. They proceed with their dance number, and despite one mishap, they finish their number gracefully.

At the train station, Amelia and Pippo kiss and bid their farewells.

== Cast ==
- Giulietta Masina as Amelia Bonetti (Ginger)
- Marcello Mastroianni as Pippo Botticella (Fred)
- Franco Fabrizi as Show host
- Friedrich von Ledebur as Admiral Aulenti
- Augusto Poderosi as transvestite
- Martin Maria Blau as assistant director
- Jacques Henri Lartigue as Brother Gerolamo
- Totò Mignone as Totò
- Ezio Marano as the intellectual
- Antoine Saint-John as bandaged man
- Friedrich von Thun as kidnapped tycoon
- Antonino Iuorio as TV inspector
- Barbara Scoppa as journalist
- Elisabetta Flumeri as journalist
- Salvatore Billa as Clark Gable
- Caterina Vertova

== Release ==
The film opened the 36th Berlin Film Festival on 14 February 1986.

== Reception ==
=== Critical response ===
Ginger and Fred has an approval rating of 77% on review aggregator website Rotten Tomatoes, based on 13 reviews, and an average rating of 7/10.

=== Awards and nominations ===
Ginger and Fred was nominated for best foreign film awards in 1986 by the U.S. National Board of Review of Motion Pictures, as well as the 1987 Golden Globes and BAFTA. Masina received a David di Donatello for Best Actress award for her role (1986).

== See also ==
- Rogers v. Grimaldi
