= Eliomar =

Eliomar is a Portuguese language male given name, which is a variant of the Italian name Elio, meaning "sun" from the Greek name Helios. Related names include Elio, Eliodoro, and Elion. The name Eliomar may refer to:

- Eliomar Correia Silva (born 1988), Brazilian footballer
- Eliomar dos Santos Silva (born 1987), Brazilian footballer
- Eliomar Marcón (born 1975), Brazilian footballer
