= Hélio de Oliveira Santos =

Brazilian politician

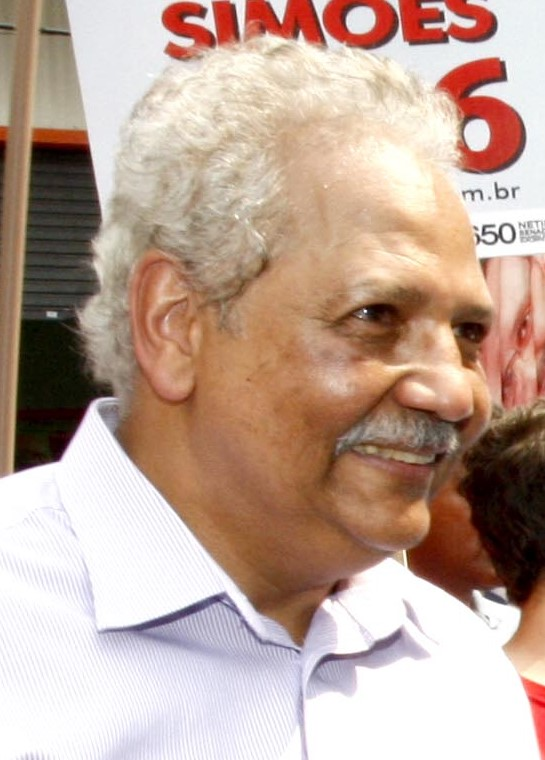

Mayor of Campinas
- In office 1 January 2005 – 20 August 2011
- Vice-Mayor: Guilherme Campos Júnior (2005-2008); Demétrio Vilagra (2009-2011)
- Preceded by: Izalene Tiene
- Succeeded by: Demétrio Vilagra

Federal Deputy for São Paulo
- In office 1 February 1999 – 31 December 2004

Personal details
- Born: 6 September 1950 (age 76) Corumbá, Mato Grosso do Sul, Brazil
- Party: PDT (2020-present)
- Other political affiliations: PL (2019-2020); PHS (2019-2020); PTC (2013-2016); PDT (1980-2013)
- Spouse: Rosely Nassim Jorge dos Santos

Hélio de Oliveira Santos (born September 7, 1950, Corumbá, Mato Grosso do Sul) is a physician, graduated in the Medical School of the State University of Campinas and specialized in pediatrics, federal representative, and was the mayor of the municipality of Campinas, state of São Paulo, Brazil, from January 2005 to September 2011, when he was impeached. He is affiliated with the Partido Democrático Trabalhista (PDT).

== Medical and academic career ==
Dr. Santos began his academic career in 1970, while a student at the Medical School of the State University of Campinas, as a research and teaching assistant at the Laboratory of Parasitology in 1970, Physiology and Biophysics in 1971, and Hemotherapy in 1973. After obtaining his M.D. in 1974, Santos became a medical resident at the same university, from 1974 to 1975. He specialized in neonatal care in the Unit of Intensive Neonatal Care at ISSTE, Mexico City, in 1977. Upon returning to Brazil, Dr. Santos dedicated himself to pediatric care, research and teaching, especially pediatric surgery, first at the Teaching Dept of the Hospital Infantil Álvaro Ribeiro in Campinas (1980–1986) and afterwards as a professor at the Medical School of the Pontificial Catholic University of Campinas (PUCCAMP), a position he held until 1989. He was also that school's dean from 1981 to 1984. In 1985, he attained a doctoral degree in outpatient pediatric surgery from the Medical School of the State University of Campinas. He did his postdoctoral studies abroad, at the Children's Memorial Hospital of Chicago, United States. In 1988, he accepted an appointment as an associate professor of pediatrics at the same school.

He wrote seven books and hundreds of specialized papers, articles and columns in the general press. Among his works are a series of books on the plights of physical abuse, rape, accidents and abandonment of children, published between 1986 and 1995.

== Political career ==
Dr. Santos became a public figure in the 1980s, when he founded and directed the Regional Center for Care of Maltreatment in Infancy (CRAMI - Centro Regional para a Atenção aos Maus Tratos na Infância), a highly praised philanthropic effort in Campinas county. On the basis of his work, he was appointed Municipal Secretary of Health of Hortolândia, a city near Campinas (1993–1996) and Municipal Secretary of Health of Americana (in 1997). He was elected a federal congressman by São Paulo in 1999, and re-elected in 2003. His first attempt at winning a mayoral election was in 2001, but he lost to majority candidates Carlos Sampaio and Antonio Costa. In his second run, he was elected with 258,456 votes, 52.63% of all valid votes in Campinas, the second largest electoral college in the state. He is the first Afro-Brazilian to be elected mayor of that city.

In 2011, Dr. Santos was impeached from his position as mayor of Campinas, after an administrative process installed by the City Council, after accusations of fraud and corruption. His wife was arrested by the federal police and handcuffed in the morning when proceedings began.

== Works ==
- Cirurgia ambulatorial em pediatria. São Paulo: Panamed, 1986. 116 p.
- Crianças espancadas. Campinas: Papirus, 1987. 132 p.
- Crianças accidentadas. Campinas: Papirus, 1988. 91 p. ISBN 8530800095
- Crianças violadas. Campinas: CBIA/CRAMI, 1991. 114 p.
- Crianças esquecidas. Campinas: Pontes, 1995. ISBN 8571131015
- Naves-mãe e a pedagogia dos sentidos: de Campinas, novos paradigmas para a educação infantil no Brasil. Campinas: Komedi, 2010. 143 p. ISBN 9788575825808
