= Monterrey Mexico Temple =

Latter-day Saint temple in Mexico

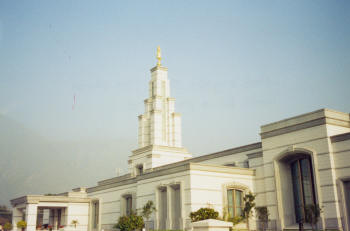
- Interactive map of Monterrey Mexico Temple
- Number: 110
- Dedication: 28 April 2002, by Gordon B. Hinckley
- Site: 7.78 acres (3.15 ha)
- Floor area: 16,498 ft^{2} (1,532.7 m^{2})
- Official website • News & images

Church chronology
← Lubbock Texas Temple	Monterrey Mexico Temple	→ Campinas Brazil Temple

Additional information
- Announced: 21 December 1995, by Gordon B. Hinckley
- Groundbreaking: 4 November 2000, by Lynn A. Mickelsen
- Open house: 8–20 April 2002
- Current president: Julio González
- Designed by: Alvaro Inigo
- Location: Monterrey, Mexico
- Coordinates: 25°35′21.38639″N 100°15′36.22680″W
- Exterior finish: White granite from Vermont
- Design: Classic modern, single-spire design
- Baptistries: 1
- Ordinance rooms: 2 (two-stage progressive)
- Sealing rooms: 2

The Monterrey Mexico Temple is a temple of the Church of Jesus Christ of Latter-day Saints in Valle Alto, Monterrey, Nuevo León, Mexico. The intent to build the temple was announced on December 27, 1995, by the First Presidency. It is the twelfth built in Mexico and the church's 110th operating temple worldwide. Located in the southeastern section of Monterrey along the National Highway near Cerro de la Silla, the temple is on an 8.2-acre property shared with a stake center. The white marble building was designed by Alvaro Inigo and has a single spire. Construction faced significant delays due to opposition from adjacent property owners of the initially selected site, ultimately leading to a relocation to Valle Alto nearly five years after the announcement. A groundbreaking ceremony was held on November 4, 2000, conducted by Lynn A. Mickelsen, a general authority and president of the church's Mexico North Area. The temple was dedicated on April 28, 2002, by church president Gordon B. Hinckley, in four sessions attended by 12,617 members.

== History ==
The First Presidency announced plans to build a temple in Monterrey on December 27, 1995. For members living in Monterrey, this announcement ended decades of lengthy travel to distant temples. Previously, the nearest temple was in Mexico City, approximately 430 miles away. Members would rent buses and make annual trips lasting extended periods to either worship there or at the Mesa Arizona Temple.

When announced, it was to became Mexico's second temple, after the one in Mexico City being dedicated in 1983. However, it became the twelfth temple dedicated in the country due to the construction delays.

The church initially selected a site adjacent to Colegio Labastida on Avenida Vasconcelos in San Pedro for the temple. After neighboring property owners filed a legal suit in opposition, a three-year legal dispute ensued. Although the church prevailed in the legal proceedings, its leaders decided to relocate the temple to appease the opposing neighbors. The new site in Valle Alto was chosen in March 2000, with a building permit issued on June 27, 2000. When the location changed, the original design for the temple was substituted with a smaller standard design.

The groundbreaking ceremony took place on November 4, 2000, presided over by Lynn A. Mickelsen, a general authority and president of the Mexico North Area. The Monterrey temple's groundbreaking was held the same day as the one for the Lubbock Texas Temple. The two temples were later dedicated seven days apart.

Despite the delays and challenges, local media coverage of the temple's construction generated unprecedented attention for the church in Monterrey, leading to increased public interest in the temple and the church's teachings.

After construction was completed, a public open house was held from April 8 to 20, 2002, during which about 40,300 people toured the temple. This included business, government, and civic leaders, as well as officials from other faiths. Raul Salcedo, who directed the temple's public affairs, noted that the church in Monterrey had never before received such widespread attention.

With four sessions held and over 12,600 church members attending, the Monterrey Mexico Temple was dedicated on April 28, 2002, by church president Gordon B. Hinckley.

In 2020, like all the church's others, the Monterrey Mexico Temple was closed for a time in response to the COVID-19 pandemic.

== Design and architecture ==
The temple is on an 8.2-acre property in Valle Alto, near the mountain peaks of Monterrey along the National Highway near the Cerro de la Silla. The property is shared with a stake center that was constructed at the same time as the temple. The surrounding grounds are open to the public.

It is constructed with white marble brought from Torreón, Mexico, the same marble used in other temples in Mexico. The temple has a classic modern design with a single attached spire, with a statue of the angel Moroni on its top. It is 98 feet by 188 feet and is approximately 16,000 square feet in total floor area.

The interior includes a baptistry, two ordinance rooms, and two sealing rooms. The temple serves church members from the Monterrey area of northern central Mexico.

The temple was designed by architect Alvaro Inigo. William Treu served as project manager, and the construction was completed by Okland Construction Co. and Impulsa.

== Temple leadership and admittance ==
=== Leadership ===
The church's temples are directed by a temple president and matron, each typically serving for a term of three years. The president and matron oversee the administration of temple operations and provide guidance and training for both temple patrons and staff. Serving from 2002 to 2004, the first president, Eran A. Call, had been a general authority from 1997 to 2000. Katherine G. Call served as matron. As of 2025, Julio C. Castillo is the president, with Elda A. Carmona de González serving as matron.

=== Admittance ===
Following construction, the church announced the public open house that was held from April 8 to 20, 2002. Like all the church's temples, it is not used for Sunday worship services. To members of the church, temples are regarded as sacred houses of the Lord. Once dedicated, only church members with a current temple recommend can enter for worship.

== See also ==
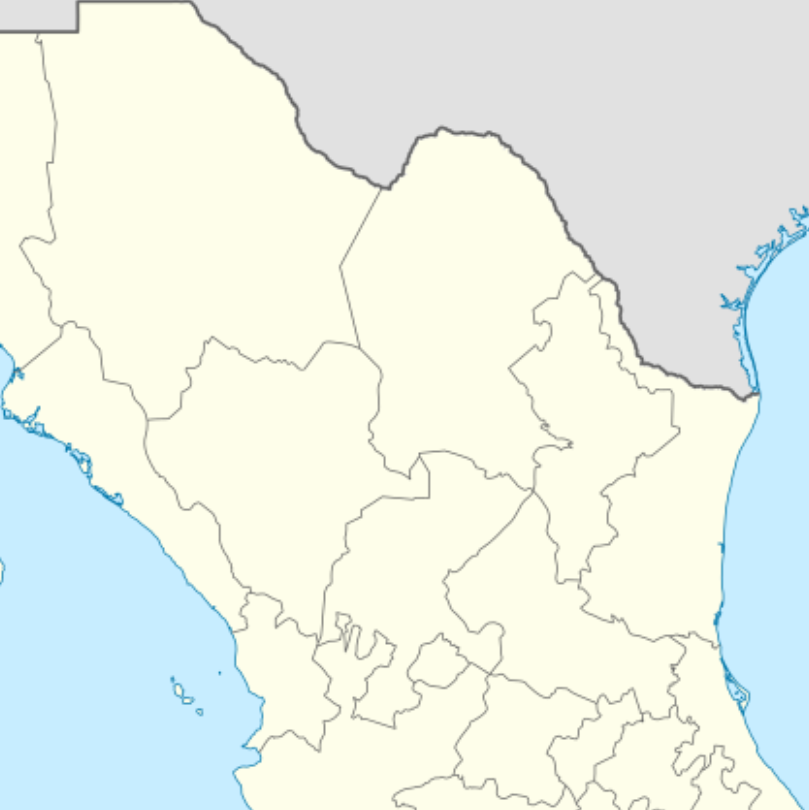

Temples in Northeastern Mexico

Northwest Mexico Temples
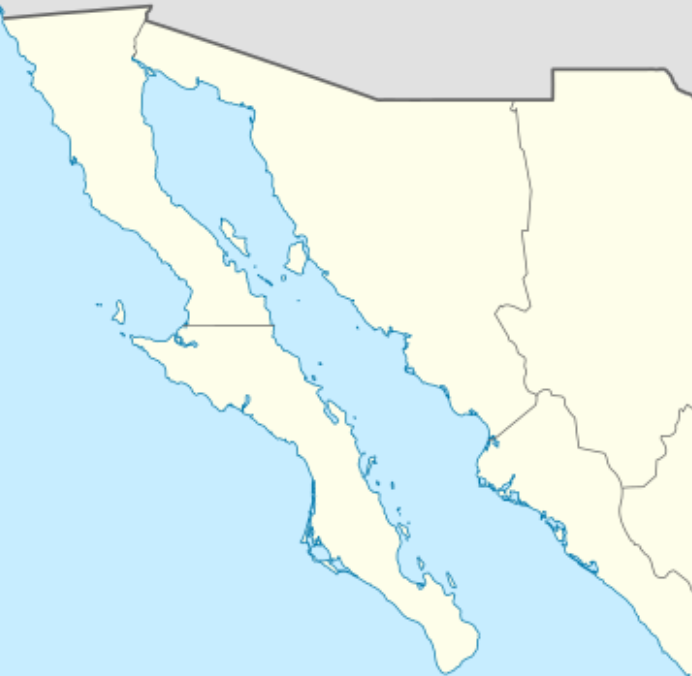
Temples in Northwestern Mexico
Central Mexico Temples
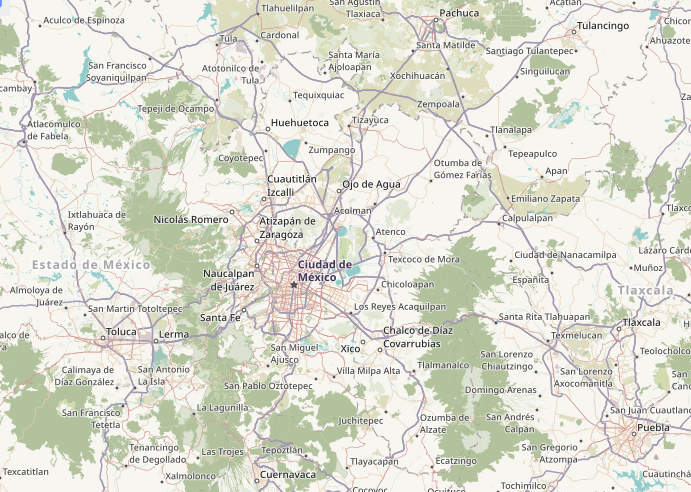
Temples in Central Mexico
Southeast Mexico Temples
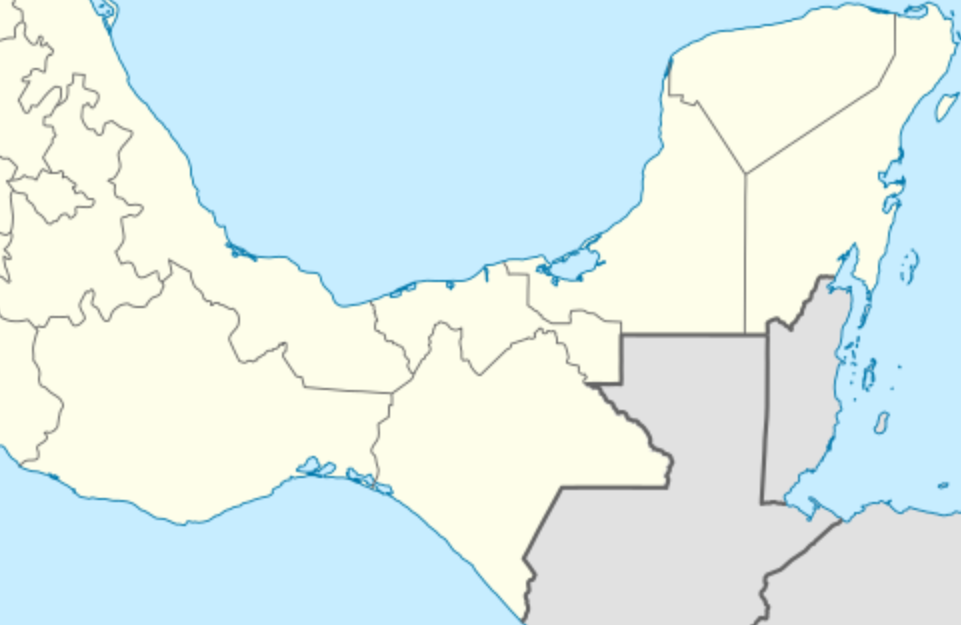
Temples in Southeast Mexico
Mexico Map
Temples in Mexico

= Operating
= Under construction
= Announced
= Temporarily Closed

- Horacio A. Tenorio, former temple president
- Comparison of temples of The Church of Jesus Christ of Latter-day Saints
- List of temples of The Church of Jesus Christ of Latter-day Saints
- List of temples of The Church of Jesus Christ of Latter-day Saints by geographic region
- Temple architecture (Latter-day Saints)
- The Church of Jesus Christ of Latter-day Saints in Mexico
