= Sarah West (actress) =

British actress (1790–1876)

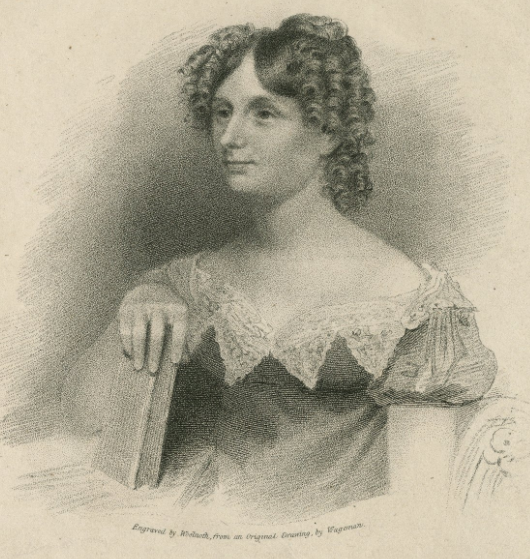
- Born: Sarah Cooke; 22 March 1790; Bath, England
- Died: 30 December 1876 (aged 86); Glasgow, Scotland
- Occupation: Actress

Sarah West (22 March 1790 – 30 December 1876) was a British actress.

== Life ==
She was born Sarah Cooke in Bath, Somerset on 22 March 1790, daughter of Mr. Cooke of Bath. Influenced by her cousin Harriet Waylett, she appeared at the Theatre Royal, Bath on 22 May 1810 for the benefit of her uncle, an actor, playing Miss Hardcastle in She Stoops to Conquer, and in 1811, at the same house, played Emily Tempest in The Wheel of Fortune.

In the summer of 1812, she played at Cheltenham and Gloucester. Recommended by Mr. and Mrs. Charles Kemble, she made, as Miss Cooke, her first appearance at Covent Garden on 28 September 1812 as Desdemona. On 10 November 1814, she played Juliet at Edinburgh. She was followed there by William West (see below), and in March 1815 they married.

On 30 September 1815, as "Mrs. W. West (late Miss Cooke) from Edinburgh", she reappeared in Bath. On 17 September 1818, she made as Desdemona her first appearance at Drury Lane Theatre. Leading business, principally tragic, was now assigned her. After the death of Alexander Rae, the Edgar to her Cordelia and the Lear of Edmund Kean, she spoke an address for the benefit of his family on 31 October 1820. It was thought an example of her dramatic intelligence that she avoided the last line, which was to be "pardon Cordelia's tears, they're shed for Rae". Conscious of its bathos, she substituted for it, with great effect, the line, "Pardon Cordelia's tears. Poor Tom's a cold."

West was at Drury Lane the first Beaumelle in an alteration of The Fatal Dowry on 5 January 1824. When the record in John Genest's history stops, information concerning her becomes scanty. It appears she was in a relationship with Leman Rede by 1830, a newspaper report on his death in 1847 states that they 'were united in 1830 and he left a ten year old son by that lady'. In 1835 she was at Covent Garden under David Osbaldiston, but played mainly secondary parts, and she then lapsed into performing at lesser theatres. Her last London engagement was at the Marylebone Theatre in about 1847.

Sarah West died at Glasgow on 30 December 1876 at the house of her great-nephew, Henry Courte Cooke, and was buried at Sighthill cemetery on 2 January 1877.

== Assessment ==
Sarah West in her time was classed next to Elizabeth O'Neill, as a capable actress. William Oxberry's Dramatic Biography called her one of the most beautiful women on the stage.

== Family ==
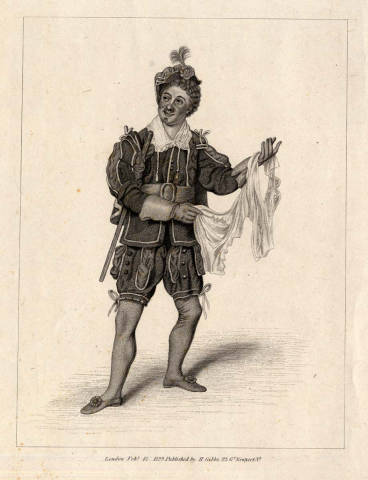
William West as Leporello, 1829 engraving

Her husband, William West (1796–1888), comedian and musical composer, lived to be called "The Father of the Stage". After being mistreated by her husband, Sarah West separated early from William, by whom she had two children, and never rejoined him.

West's father was connected with Drury Lane Theatre. After studying music under Thomas Welsh and subsequently under Charles Edward Horn, he appeared at the Haymarket Theatre in 1805 as Tom Thumb. He then played parts at Drury Lane such as Juba in The Prize and Boy in Children in the Wood. In 1814 he followed Sarah to Edinburgh, and next year married her, in the teeth of much competition.

West's first appearance in Edinburgh was on 10 November 1814 as Don Carlos in The Duenna. After playing in Bath and Bristol he appeared in London at the East London Theatre, and on 9 May 1822 played, at Drury Lane, Lord Ogleby in the Clandestine Marriage. He also acted at the Olympic and other theatres. He gave in 1842 an entertainment based on the Shakespearean clown.

West died late in January or early in February 1888. He wrote some popular songs: When Love was fresh from her Cradle-bed, Alice of Fyfe, and Love and the Sensitive Plant. His glees included The Ocean King, Up Rosalie, Oh, Bold Robin Hood, and The Haaf Fishers. Maid Marian was a sonata, and he also wrote An Ancient English Morris Dance with Variations.
