= Cora, the Indian Maiden's Song =

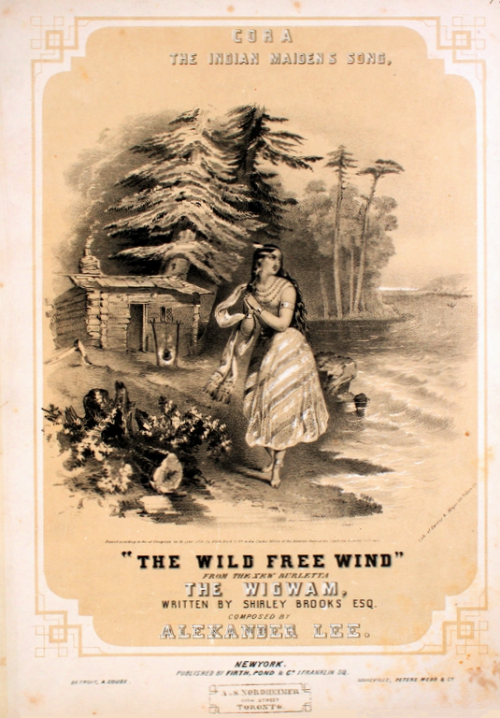
- Sheet music cover, 1851

Song
- Published: 1851
- Composer(s): Alexander Lee
- Lyricist(s): Shirley Brooks

"Cora, the Indian Maiden's Song" ("The Wild Free Wind") is a song written by Shirley Brooks for his burletta The Wigwam sometime before 1847. Alexander Lee composed the music. In the song, Cora, the Indian maiden, is praising the wind: "Oh! The wild free wind is a Spirit Kind, And it loves the Indians well." The song's chorus is:

It speeds her dart to the red deer's heart
As he bounds from his secret lair
And whether o'er sea or land it go, or land it go.
She loves to hear the wild wind blow,
To hear the wild wind blow.

In the 1847 London presentation of The Wigwam, Mary Keeley played Cora where she received high praise for her rendering of the song.

== Bibliography ==
- Brooks, Shirley (w.); Lee, Alexander (m). "Cora, the Indian Maiden's Song" (Sheet music). New York: Firth, Pond & Co. (1851).
- The Musical World Vol. XXII (No. 7, Saturday, February 13, 1847). London: W.S Johnson (1847).
