= Schneemann =

Schneemann is a surname. Notable people with the surname include:

- Bart Schneemann (born 1954), Dutch oboist and conductor
- Carolee Schneemann (1939–2019), American visual artist
- Daniel Schneemann (born 1997), American baseball player
- Gerhard Schneemann (1829–1885), German Jesuit
- Greg Schneemann, South African politician

== See also ==
- Schneeman, another surname
- Schneemann and Sonnenweiberl
