= Horacio A. Tenorio =

Mexican Latter-day Saint leader (1935–2021)

Second Quorum of the Seventy
- 1 April 1989 – 1 October 1994
- Called by: Ezra Taft Benson
- End reason: Honorably released

Personal details
- Born: Horacio Antonio Tenorio; March 6, 1935; Mexico City, Mexico
- Died: October 20, 2021 (aged 86); Atizapán de Zaragoza, Edo. de México

Horacio Antonio Tenorio (6 March 1935 – 20 October 2021) was the first general authority in the Church of Jesus Christ of Latter-day Saints (LDS Church) of Mexican ancestry.

== Life ==
Tenorio was born in Mexico City, Mexico. He was trained in business with graduate training in purchasing. He and his wife, Maria, were married in 1957 and are the parents of three children.

In 1969, he joined the LDS Church. He began service as a stake president in 1975. He later served as a Regional representative and president of the church's Mexico Torreón Mission.

From 1989 until 1994, Tenorio served as a member of the Second Quorum of the Seventy. From 2007 to 2010, he was president of the Monterrey Mexico Temple. He died on October 20, 2021.
