= Sorina =

Sorina is both a feminine Romanian given name and a surname. Notable people with the name include:

== Given name ==
- Florina Sorina Hulpan, a Romanian Olympics weightlifter
- Sorina-Luminița Plăcintă, a Romanian engineer and politician
- Sorina Nwachukwu, a German sprinter of Nigerian descent
- Silvia Sorina Munteanu, a Romanian opera singer
- Sorina Ștefârță, a journalist from the Republic of Moldova
- Sorina Tîrcă, a Romanian handballer

== Surname ==
- Alexandra Sorina, a Belarusian actress
- Arnold Sorina, a Vanuatuan Olympics middle-distance runner

== See also ==
- Sorin (disambiguation)
