= Sorin (given name) =

- Gender: Male

Origin
- Origin: Italic
- Region of origin: Romania

Other names
- Related names: Sorín, Sorina

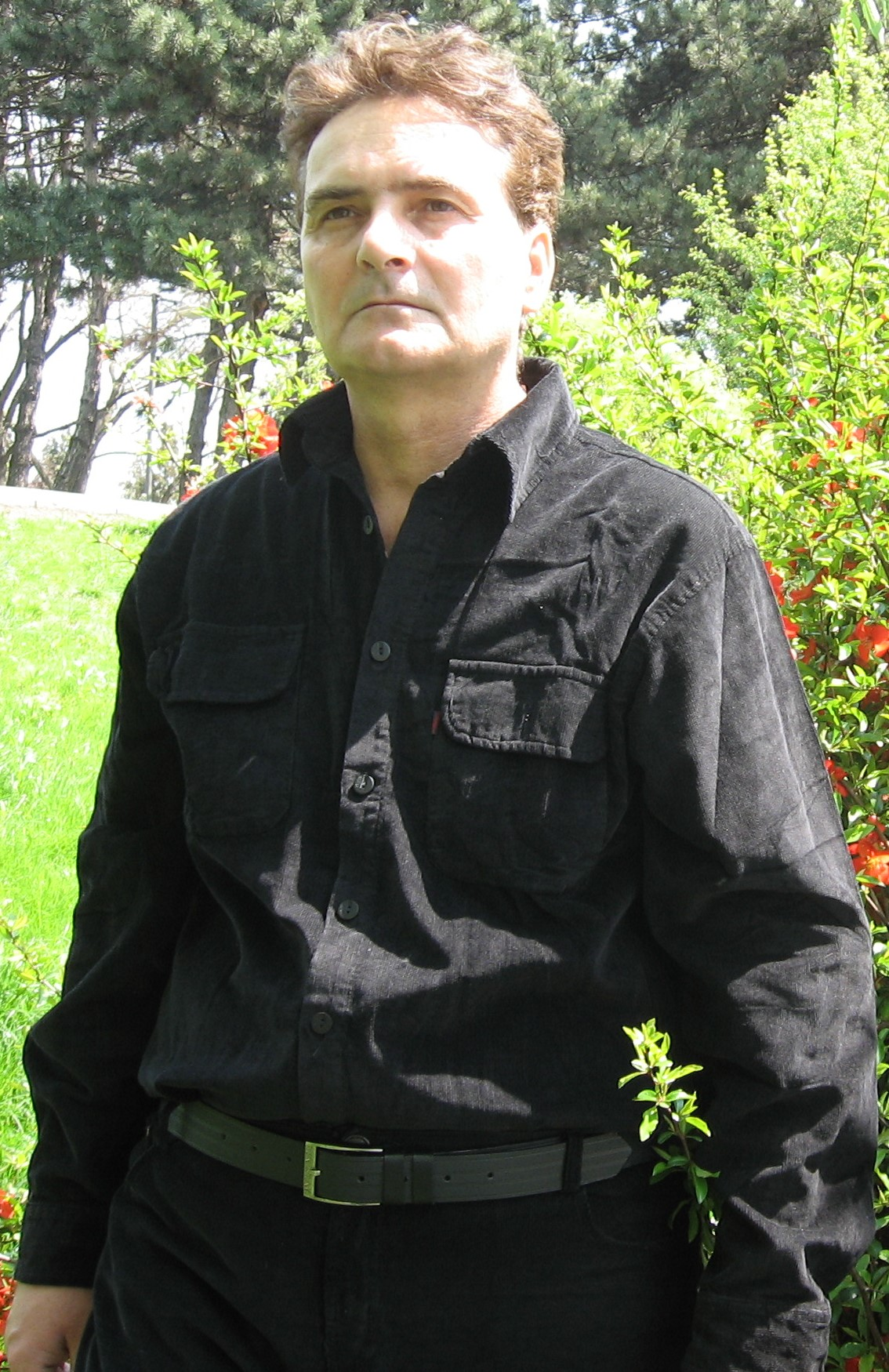
Sorin Cerin, Spring 2010

Sorin is a Romanian masculine name that originates from the noun soare, which means "Sun". Sorin is common as a given name, but it also exists as a surname. People with the given name include:

- Sorin Antohi
- Sorin Bottez
- Sorin Chifiriuc
- Sorin Frunză
- Sorin Ghionea
- Sorin Iodi
- Sorin Lavric
- Sorin Lerescu
- Sorin Matei
- Sorin Oprescu
- Sorin Paraschiv
- Sorin Popa
- Sorin Rădoi
- Sorin Socol

== See also ==
- Sorin (disambiguation)
