= Elio García-Austt =

Uruguayan neuroscientist (1919–2005)

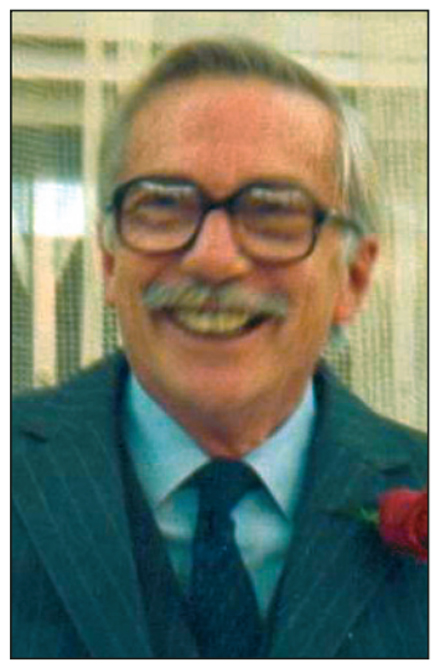
Elio Garcia Austt

Elio García-Austt (1919–2005) was a Uruguayan neuroscientist.

== Early life in Montevideo ==
García-Austt's father was a professor of Psychiatry at the School of Medicine in Montevideo, and was a member of the Parliament of Uruguay.

García-Austt graduated with honors as "Doctor en Medicina y Cirugía" (M.D.) at the University of the Republic in 1948, and obtained a gold medal with a doctoral thesis on "Repercussion of some metabolic alterations on the bioelectric potentials." Before his graduation, he had started his career as a neuroscientist, developing clinical electroencephalography at the Instituto de Endocrinología using the first recording instrument available in Uruguay by 1942.

After graduating, he continued his job as clinical neurophysiologist and published his first papers on epilepsy. His clinical career continued with the foundation and direction of five clinical electroencephalography laboratories at Montevideo's public hospitals.

García-Austt's interest in basic scientific research on neurophysiology arose at the Department of Physiology of the Medical School of Montevideo under Dr. Corneille Heymans during García-Austt's extended stay in Montevideo in the postwar period. He claimed that his relationship with Heymans was fundamental for the start of his career as a neurobiologist.

In 1951, he worked in the Neurophysiology Laboratory of the Pontifical Catholic University at Santiago de Chile under the direction of noted neurobiologist Prof. Joaquin Luco. Back in Montevideo, he started the "Laboratorio de Neurofisiología" in collaboration with Drs. E. Migliaro and J.P. Segundo. This laboratory was under the joint jurisdiction of the Biophysics and Physiology Departments.

In the Neurophysiology Laboratory, a set of neurobiological researchers was trained. Those researchers continued his work in different laboratories in Uruguay and other countries. At this school, García-Austt set up a course of the nervous system which included faculty from the physiology, biophysics, histology, anatomy, and pharmacology departments.

In 1959, García-Austt created the Neurophysiology Laboratory at the "Instituto de Neurología y Neurocirugía" of the School of Medicine. He worked until 1973, when he moved to Spain. The laboratory's research included:

1. Evoked potentials in humans and their relationship with attention and perception.
2. Regulating mechanisms of sensory, auditive, visual, and somesthetic inputs.
3. Recording electrical stimulation during brain surgery in humans.
4. Oxygen pressure variation during sleep.
5. Physiology and physiopathology of the intracranial pressure. This research created a procedure for the diagnosis of normotensive hydrocephalus.

During this period, his research work was largely financed by foreign grants.

== Madrid ==
In 1973, he was invited by Jose M. Rodriguez Delgado to work in Madrid, Spain, collaborating in the development of neurobiology at the "Hospital 'Ramón y Cajal' of Social Security".

He accepted it, due to both the better facilities and the unbearable socio-political climate in Uruguay.

At that hospital he founded the Experimental Neurology Service of the Research Department. For 15 years, he worked on the generating mechanisms of brain rhythms. He collaborated with the Neurochirurgica Unit, led by Dr. Obrador-Alcalde, connecting his research to the clinical area of the hospital. As professor in the Department of Physiology of the School of Medicine of the Universidad Autónoma in Madrid, he taught neuroscience in close collaboration with Professors Rodriguez Delgado and Reinoso Suarez.

== Garcia-Austt and the Spanish Neurosciences Society ==
In 1980, 1981, and 1983, García-Austt organized preliminary scientific meetings, named the I, II, and III Spanish Neurobiologists Meetings, in collaboration with Reinoso Suarez, Salvador Lluch, and Isabel de Andres, leading to the creation of the Spanish Neurosciences Society in 1985. Garcia-Austt was the first president.

== Return to Montevideo ==
In 1988, García-Austt returned to Montevideo to lead the 'Proyecto de Neurociencia,' a neuroscience initiative funded by the European Union. This grant, the EU's first scientific funding initiative in Latin America, supported the development of five neuroscience research projects across multiple Uruguayan laboratories. García-Austt’s work played an essential role in fostering collaboration and creating opportunities for scientists who had worked abroad to return to Uruguay. During this time, he continued to maintain an office at the Hospital 'Ramón y Cajal' in Madrid.

In Uruguay, García-Austt organized national and international neuroscience courses, laying the groundwork for what would later become the "Escuela de Neurociencia" in Hispanic America.

In 1991, he was appointed Professor of Neuroscience of the School of Sciences of the University of Uruguay, a position which he held until his retirement in 1999.

He married twice and had five sons. He died in Montevideo on 12th August 2005.

== Positions ==
- Associate Professor of Physiology, Facultad de Medicina de Montevideo, 1959–1974
- Chief of "Servicio de Neurología Experimental", at Departamento de Investigación, Centro Especial “Ramón y Cajal”, Madrid, 1977–1989
- Professor ad honorem, School of Medicine, Universidad Autónoma de Madrid, 1974
- "Professor Especial", School of Medicine, Universidad Autónoma de Madrid, 1975–1988
- "Professor Emérito", School of Medicine, Uruguay, 1986
- "Professor Honorífico", Hospital Ramón y Cajal, Madrid, 1990
- Professor of Neurosciences, Facultad de Ciencias, Uruguay, 1991–1999
- Director of the Instituto de Biología, Facultad de Ciencias, Uruguay, 1991–1994
- "Professor Emérito", Facultad de Ciencias, Uruguay, 1998
- "Doctor Honoris Causa", Universidad, Uruguay, 2000
