= Helios AG =

Coordinates: 50°57′3.6″N 6°54′50.4″E

Helios AG für elektrisches Licht und Telegraphenanlagenbau
- Type: Public
- Industry: Electrical engineering
- Founded: 1882
- Defunct: 1930
- Fate: 1904 Takeover by AEG 1930 Plant closure
- Headquarters: Cologne, Germany

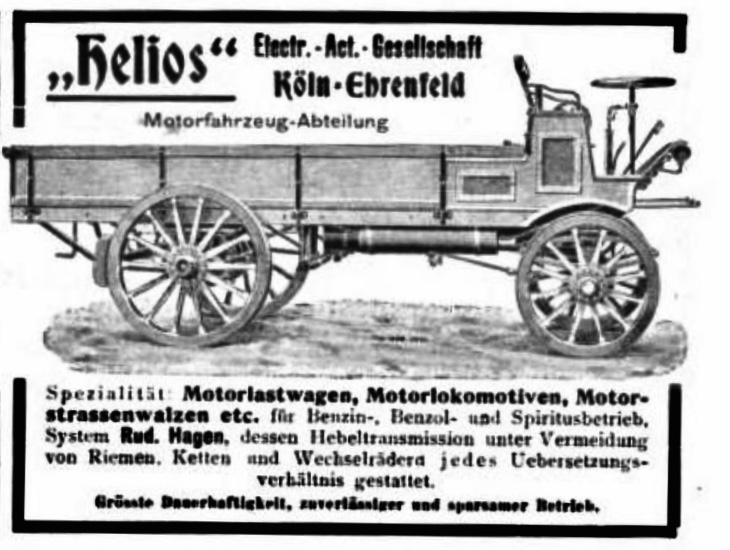
Helios AG truck (1903)

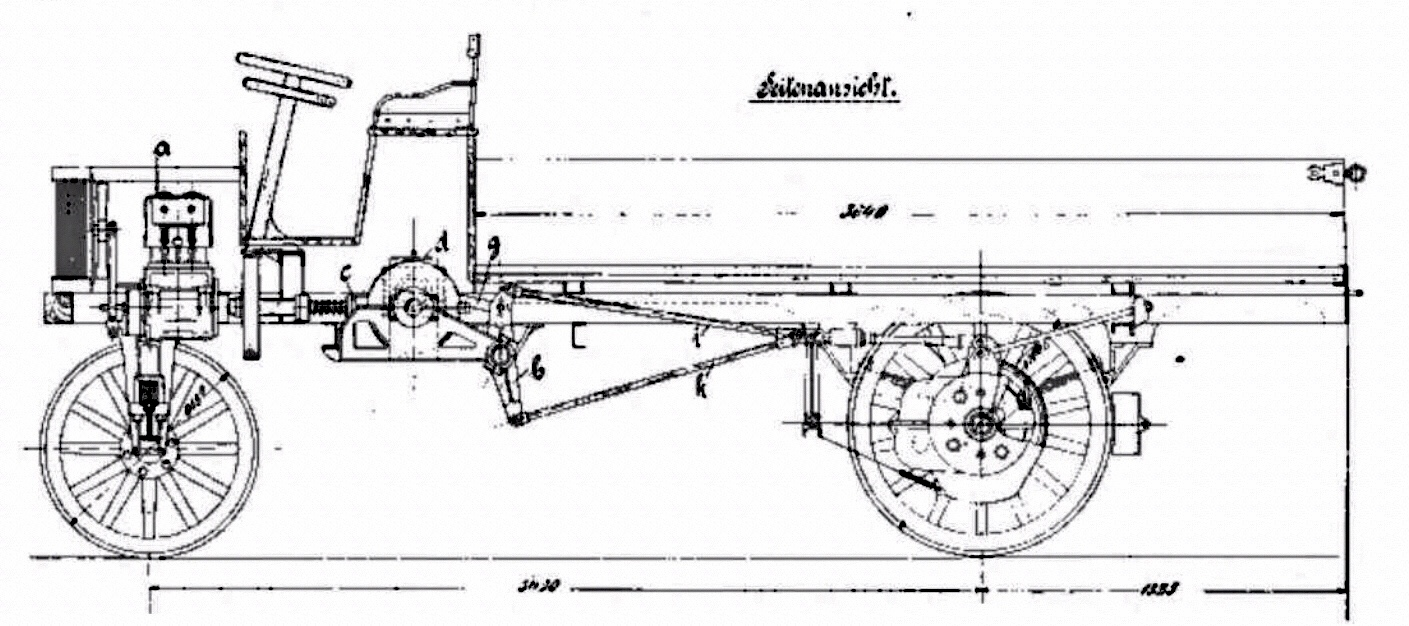
Helios AG truck (Motorlastwagenfabrik Rudolf Hagen & Cie. GmbH) (1904)

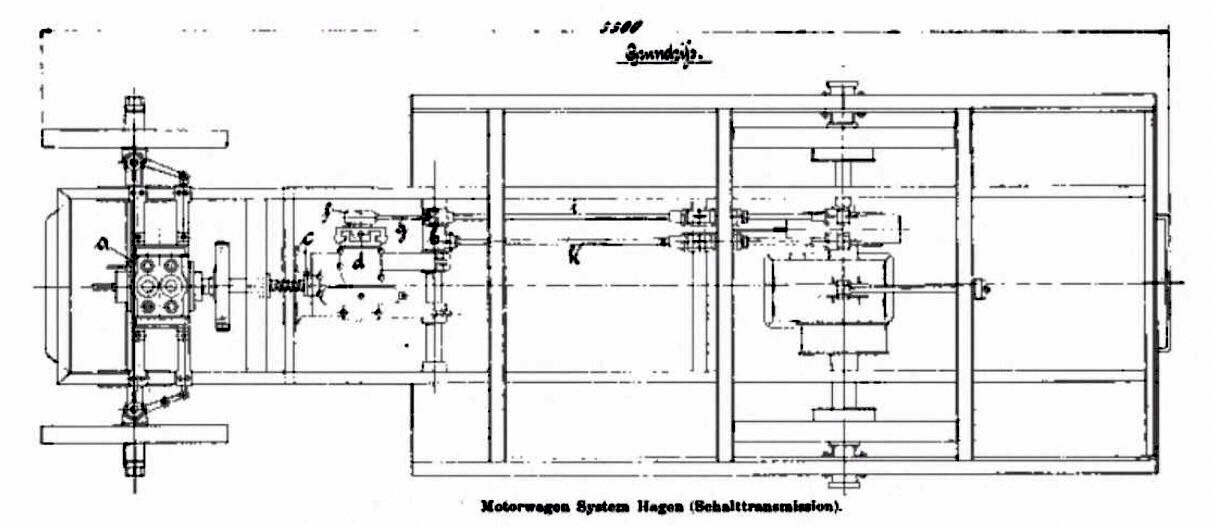
Helios AG (Motorlastwagenfabrik Rudolf Hagen & Cie. GmbH) top (1904)

The Helios AG für elektrisches Licht und Telegraphenanlagenbau was a German electrical engineering company. Founded in 1882, it existed until its liquidation in 1930. The company was based in the town of Ehrenfeld, which was incorporated into Cologne in 1888. The company is presently best known for the Heliosturm, a lighthouse on the former site of the factory that was constructed for test and research purposes. Today, the area is used by gastronomy and craft businesses.

== History ==
Helios AG was a notable entity in the late 19th and early 20th centuries, specializing in the production of electrical equipment and infrastructure. Founded in 1870 as the Society for Electric Light and Telegraph Construction Barthel Berghausen and Co. in Ehrenfeld, Germany, it later evolved into Helios AG on July 31, 1884. Situated strategically at Venloer Straße No. 387–389, the company's location was chosen for its proximity to transportation hubs, including the Cologne – Aachen railway line and the horse tram route to Cologne.

Named after the Greek sun god, Helios AG quickly established itself as a leader in innovation, particularly in the field of electricity generation and distribution. The company pioneered the development and implementation of alternating current (AC) systems, manufacturing complete electricity plants that were deployed across Europe. Helios also employed a successful business model, similar to that of AEG, offering participation to newly established electricity plants in exchange for their commitment to purchasing Helios equipment.

In addition to electricity generation, Helios was involved in the construction of electric tram systems, with a focus on research and development of vehicle

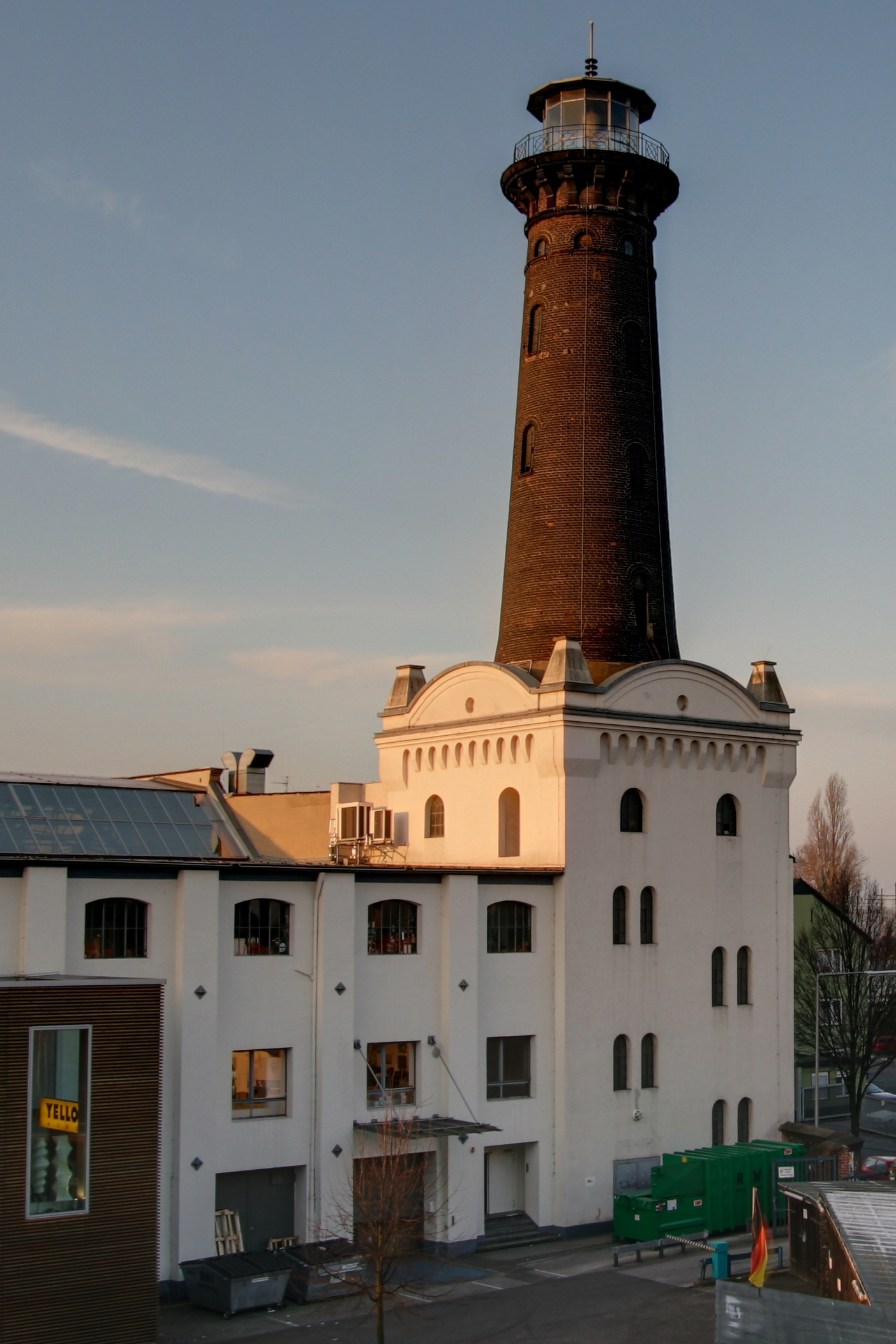
Helios lighthouse in Cologne-Ehrenfeld

technologies. The company's influence extended beyond Germany, as it exported products such as generators, transformers, and lighting equipment worldwide. Helios also played a significant role in the construction of lighthouses and sea signal technology, contributing to maritime safety.

However, despite its initial success, Helios faced challenges in the early 20th century due to declining demand and financial setbacks, including a loss-making acquisition. Siemens and AEG intervened in 1904 but ultimately pursued the liquidation of the company by 1905. Helios AG ceased operations in 1930, marking the end of an era in electrical engineering and infrastructure development.

Helios AG was a prominent German electrical engineering company active from the late 19th century into the early 20th century. Based in Ehrenfeld, Cologne, the firm played an important role in the early development of electrical infrastructure, including power generation, municipal lighting networks, and electric traction systems for public transport.
