= Émile Pierre Ratez =

French musician

Émile Pierre Ratez (also René Emile Ratez; 5 November 1851 – 19 May 1934) was a French composer, administrator, and violist.

== Life ==
Ratez was born in Besançon and became a pupil of Pierre De Mol at the music school there and later a pupil of Bazin and of Jules Massenet at the Conservatoire de Paris in the 1870s. In 1891, he became the director of the Lille branch of the Paris Conservatory.

Ratez died in Lille on 19 May 1934.

== Music ==
His compositions include some chamber music: at least three piano trios, a piano quintet, a cello sonata, at least two violin sonatas, a string trio, for example), a suite for violin and piano, two operas Lydéric (premiered 1895, Lille) and Paula (premiered 1904, Besançon) and many songs and other choral and piano works (&c...) His six Pièces charactéristiques have been republished by Billaudot.

== Discography ==
- 2016: Acte Préalable AP 0358 – Émile Pierre Ratez - Exhibition 1
- 2016: Acte Préalable AP 0366 – Émile Pierre Ratez - Exhibition 2
