= Charlie Pecoraro =

American actor

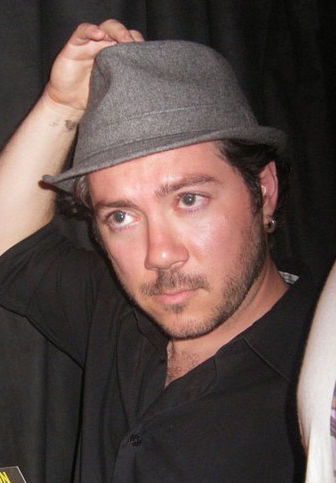
- Born: November 9, 1980 (age 44); Fullerton, California, U.S.
- Occupation: Actor
- Years active: 2005–present

Charlie Pecoraro (born November 9, 1980) is an American stage, television, and film actor.

== Biography ==
Pecoraro was born into a family of noted performers and musicians. He is the son of jazz guitarist Charles P. Pecoraro, the nephew of Actor/Dancer/Choreographer Steven Peck, nephew of opera singer Anna Pecoraro, and grandson of classical Sicilian mandolinist/vaudevillian George Pecora. Pecoraro grew up in Fullerton, CA where he attended Troy High School. Prior to beginning his career in acting, he graduated from the USC School of Cinematic Arts. He resides in Hollywood, California.

== Career ==
Pecoraro is currently a series regular on an independent TV series Slacker P.I. appearing as Detective John Derringer, and has appeared in the 2009 film The Huntleigh Files and also on numerous TV shows such as Operation Repo. Furthermore, he has appeared in many TV commercials and short films. Pecoraro holds a BA in Cinema-Television from the University of Southern California. He is sometimes credited as Charles Pecoraro.

== Filmography ==
Film
Year	Film	Role	Other notes
2007	Trick	Brian	
2008	Quantum Sissy	Young John	
2008	Secrets of a Hollywood Nurse	Slobodan	
2008	Safety First: The Rise of Women!	Lockerroom guy	
2008	Free Lunch	Casey	
2009	Marriage Blows	Gavin	
2009	Once & For All	HIS Friend	
2013	Circle the Wagen	Self	
Television
Year	Title	Role	Notes
2003	Slacker P.I.	John Derringer	multiple episodes
2009	Operation Repo	Chester Arthur	In episode "3.11"
