= Sorin =

Sorin may refer to any one of the following:

== People ==
- Sorin (given name), a Romanian masculine name
- Edward Sorin (1814–1893), American priest, founder of the University of Notre Dame and St. Edwards University
- Herbert I. Sorin (1900–1994), New York politician and judge
- Igor Sorin (1969–1998), Russian musician
- Juan Pablo Sorín (born 1976), Argentinian soccer player
- Olivier Sorin (born 1981), French football goalkeeper
- Ōtomo Sōrin (1530–1587), Japanese daimyō from sengoku period

== Fictional characters ==
- Lord Sorin of Radzyn Keep, fictional character created by Melanie Rawn

== Other ==
- Sōrin, the finial of a Japanese pagoda
- Sorin Group, company producing cardiac medical devices
- Sorin Hall (University of Notre Dame), popularly known as Sorin College
