= Elios =

Elios may refer to

- Helios (can also be spelled Elios), a minor character in the Japanese Sailor Moon series.
- SS Elios, an Italian steamship seized by the United Kingdom during the Second World War
- Elios Andreini (1940–2022), Italian politician
- Elios Manzi (born 1996), Italian judoka
