= Hélio Viana =

Brazilian businessman

Hélio Viana de Freitas is a Brazilian businessman and CEO of World Sports Business and HBusiness Bank.

He was one of the principal authors of Brazil's Pelé Law of 1998, which abolished the “pass” which tied professional players to clubs, made possible the creation of leagues, and defined the professionalization of soccer. The Pelé Law also established the Consumer Law in Sports, obliged the accountability of managers, and created funding for Olympic and Paralympic sports. Viana also created the Indigenous Olympic Games and the Supportive Sport Program.

He received a master's degree in Business Administration from Fundação Getúlio Vargas. Viana was Vice President of the board of the Brazilian National Institute for the Development of Sports (INDESP - Instituto Nacional de Desenvolvimento do Desporto), the precursor to today's Ministry of Sports, from 1995 to 1998. The President was Pelé, and other members included Carlos Arthur Nuzman, Hortência Marcari, Carlos Miguel Aidar, Nelson Piquet, Rogério Amato, and Manuel Tubino.

Viana designed the Pact of Soccer in 2001, which restructured Brazilian football, turning the national championship into consecutive points, and accompanied the organization of four World Cups and three Olympic Games.
