= Elio Pecoraro =

Italian footballer (born 1967)

Personal information
- Date of birth: October 13, 1967 (age 59)
- Place of birth: Rome, Italy
- Height: 1.80 m (5 ft 11 in)
- Position: Midfielder

Senior career*
Years	Team	Apps	(Gls)
1985–1986	Sampdoria	0	(0)
1986–1987	Roma	1	(0)
1987–1988	Varese	22	(1)
1988–1990	Juventus Domo	47	(9)
1990–1992	Ostia Mare	59	(11)
1992–1993	Valmontone	27	(12)
- * Club domestic league appearances and goals

Elio Pecoraro (born October 13, 1967) is an Italian former professional football player who made 101 appearances in the Italian professional leagues playing for Roma, Varese, Juventus Domo and Ostia Mare.

He played his only Serie A game in the 1986–87 season for A.S. Roma, when he came on as a substitute for the last three minutes of the last game of the season against Avellino.
