= Gaspar Villate =

Gaspar Villate (27 January 1851 – 9 October 1891) was a Cuban composer who produced abundant and wide-ranging work, mostly centered on opera.

Villate was born in Havana. After writing the score of Angelo, tirano de Padua, he and his family immigrated to the US in 1868 when war broke out in Cuba, returning in 1871. He then composed a second opera, Las primeras armas de Richelieu. Sent to Paris to complete his studies, he wrote various contradanzas when he returned.

He spent much of his life in Europe, but also wrote creole works La virgen tropical and Adios a Cuba. His eight waltzes, his Soirées cubaines, and his romances were appreciated in Parisian salons. He wrote scores for La Czarina, premiered in the Royal Theatre of Le Havre, and Baltazar, at the Royal Theatre of Madrid. He died in Paris.

Villate was a close friend of Italian composer Verdi, and no doubt was influenced by him: Villate's work became European in taste. Despite this, his creole contradanzas are held in higher esteem today.
