= Antônio da Costa Santos =

Brazilian architect and politician (1952–2001)

Antônio da Costa Santos (also known as Toninho; 4 March 1952 – 10 September 2001) was a Brazilian architect and politician of the Workers' Party (PT).

Toninho took office as Mayor of Campinas (the third largest city in the state of São Paulo, with over 1,000,000 inhabitants), on 1 January 2001. He was shot to death at 10:15 pm, 10 September 2001, as he was driving home alone from a shopping mall. The details and motives of his murder are still largely unknown as of 2026. His assassination was overshadowed by the September 11 attacks in the United States, approximately a day later.

Toninho was succeeded in office by the vice-Mayor, Izalene Tiene. He left a daughter and a widow.

== Murder investigations ==
The murder took place in a poorly lit access road leading out of the mall. Witnesses in other cars only said to have seen a silver Vectra driving at high speed and heard shots. Two bullets shattered his car's windows and the last hit him on his left shoulder. Another car (a green Vectra) had been the object of a robbery attempt a few minutes before, on the same route.

=== Local police version ===
Initial investigations by the Campinas Civil Police promptly led to accusations against four local criminals. Robber Anderson Rogério Davi, or "Boca", 20, was arrested on 5 October, and he pointed to three other accomplices, and two of them (Flávio Roberto Mendes Clara, 19 and A.S.C, 17) were arrested on 10 October. According to the police, the men confessed that they were driving two motorcycles, looking for a car to rob. They overtook Toninho's car, but as he accelerated instead of stopping, Flávio would have shot him. A 38 calibre weapon found with Flávio would have been the crime weapon.

=== Federal police version ===
However, subsequent investigations by the Brazilian Federal Police showed that the confessions and evidence were invalid. Federal investigators instead attributed the murder to accomplices of a certain Wanderson de Paula Lima, nicknamed Andinho, who at the time was among the police's most wanted for a number of crimes. The main clue was a match between the bullets (9 mm and calibre 45) recovered from Toninho's murder scene and from the kidnapping of an 8-year-old boy in Campinas, four days after the murder.

Wanderson was arrested on 25 February 2002, in Itu. According to the police, a 9 mm pistol found in Andinho's hideout matched that used on Toninho and in the kidnapping. The police claimed that three men from Andinho's gang, driving a silver Vectra, had attempted to stop a green Vectra shortly before Toninho's murder, intending to carry out a flash kidnapping. The green Vectra was hit by calibre 45 bullets and showed silver paint streaks from an attempt by the robbers to block its path, which also smashed one of the robbers' car headlights. This detail is confirmed by a security camera from the mall that recorded a car with one headlight off. While running away from that crime, the robbers ran into the Mayor's car, and either attempted to rob it too, or were irritated because Toninho was driving at the speed limit and blocking their way.

However, the three suspects had already been killed by the police before they could be interrogated. Two of them (Valmir Conti or "Valmirzinho", 29, and Anderson José Bastos or "Alemãozinho", 22) were hiding with two other alleged members of Wanderson's gang in an apartment in Caraguatatuba. All four men died on 2 October 2001 in a shootout with a team from the Campinas Civil Police. No policemen were hurt. On 26 January 2006, two members of that team were formally indicted by São Paulo's Public Attorney for connections to Wanderson's gang.

=== Political crime ===
The police have always maintained that Toninho's murder was a common crime and that the criminals were not aware of the victim's identity. However, suspicions that the murder may have been targeted and may have had political motives were widespread and have increased recently. Just before his death, Toninho had started investigations on alleged overbudgeting in contracts with urban cleaning companies. Toninho said he had received death threats, but was not going to be intimidated by them. The murder of Celso Daniel, mayor of Santo André and also a PT member, a few months later (22 January 2002) also contributed to these suspicions.

Toninho's widow, Roseana, recently complained angrily against President Lula's alleged lack of interest in her husband's murder investigations.

== See also ==
- List of unsolved murders (2000–present)
