= Elio Schneeman =

American poet

Elio Schneeman (October 16, 1961 – August 17, 1997) was an American poet. Born in Taranto, Italy of American heritage, Schneeman moved with his family to New York City in 1966. He was well-known and respected by poets associated with the Poetry Project in New York. Schneeman's poems were published in numerous literary magazines, as well as the anthologies Nice To See You: Homage to Ted Berrigan (Coffee House Press), Out of This World (Crown/Random House), and (posthumously) An Anthology of New (American) Poets (Talisman House).

== Works ==
- In February I Think, 1978, archived from the original on 2009-05-25
- Along the Rails, ://www.unitedartistsbooks.com/ United Artists Books], 1991, ISBN 0-935992-14-6
- A Found Life, Telephone Books Press, 2000, ISBN 0-916382-36-2
