= Helios (disambiguation) =

Helios is the personification of the sun in Greek mythology.

Helios or Helio may also refer to:

== People ==
- Helius (freedman) (died 69), freedman of the emperor Claudius
- Helio Alves (born 1966), Brazilian jazz pianist and son of pianists
- Hélio Castroneves (born 1975), Brazilian race-car driver
- Hélio Gracie (1913–2009), co-founder of Brazilian jiu-jitsu
- Eadweard Muybridge (1830–1904), an English-American photographer
- Keith Kenniff, an American ambient musician
- Helios, professional wrestler also known as Ricochet

== Arts, entertainment and media ==
=== Art ===
- Helios (statue) Statue in White City, London

=== Books ===
- Helios (encyclopedia), a Greek general-knowledge reference work
- Victor "Helios" Frankenstein, a character from the Dean Koontz's Frankenstein series of novels
- Helios, a character in the manga Sailor Moon

=== Film and television ===
- Helios (film), a 2015 Hong Kong/Chinese/Taiwanese/South Korean action heist film
- Helios Aerospace, a private aerospace company in the For All Mankind television series

=== Music ===
- Helios (album), a 2014 album by The Fray
- Helios, a 1991 album by Phillip Boa
- Helios Overture, a 1903 composition by Danish composer Carl Nielsen
- Helios, an artist pseudonym for Keith Kenniff's downtempo music

=== Video games ===
- Helios, an artificial intelligence in Deus Ex
- Helios, a character in God of War III based on the mythological character.
- Helios, the Japanese name for "Aeolus", a character in Mega Man ZX Advent
- Helios, a space station in the Borderlands series

== Business and industry ==
- Helios (cinemas), a multiplex cinema operator in Poland
- Helios (lens brand), a defunct brand of camera lens manufactured in the U.S.S.R.
- Helios (mixing console), a British brand from 1969 to 1979
- Helios AG, a former German electrical engineering company; based in Cologne
- Helios Investment Partners, a London-based investment firm
- Helios, a German motorcycle; see History of BMW motorcycles

=== Aviation ===
- Helios Airways, a former low-cost airline operating scheduled and charter flights between Cyprus and many European destinations
- Helios Prototype, a NASA developed solar and fuel-cell-system-powered unmanned aerial vehicle

=== Military ===
- HELIOS, a laser weapon system developed by the US military

== Science ==
=== Computing ===
- Helios (operating system), a Unix-like computer operating system
- Helios, the project name for the Eclipse software version 3.6 release
- Helios, a supercomputer in Rokkasho, Aomori for simulating plasma physics
- Helios Voting, an electronic voting system
- Helios, an AI Server rack by AMD

=== Space ===
- Helios (propulsion system), nuclear pulse propulsion system for spacecraft invented by Freeman Dyson, a precursor to his Project Orion
- Helios (spacecraft), pair of probes launched in the mid-1970s by the Federal Republic of Germany and NASA
- Hélios 1B and Helios 2 (satellite), French military satellites
- The Sun, known as Helios in Greek
- 895 Helio, a minor planet orbiting the Sun

=== Other uses in science ===
- Helical orbit spectrometer, a nuclear spectrometer at the Argonne National Laboratory
- Zinc finger protein Helios, encoded by the IKZF2 gene

== Sports teams ==
- FC Helios Kharkiv, (Gelios, on their emblem) a Ukrainian association-football team
- KK Helios Domžale, a Slovenian basketball team
- SpVgg Helios München, a German association-football team from Munich
- Võru FC Helios, an Estonian association-football team

== Other uses ==
- Helios (building), an apartment building in Seattle, Washington, United States
- USS Helios, a U.S. Navy World War II repair ship
- FV Helios, a French fishing vessel in service during the 1950s
