= Harriet Waylett =

English actress and theatre manager

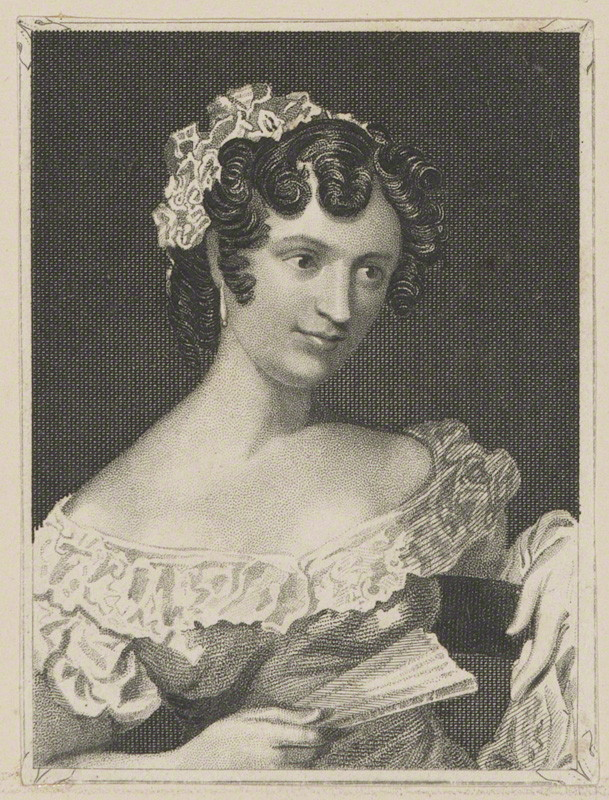
- Born: 7 February 1798; Bath, Somerset, England
- Died: 29 April 1851 (aged 53)
- Occupations: Actress; theatre manager

Harriet Waylett (7 February 1798 – 29 April 1851) was an English actress and theatre manager.

== Early life ==
The daughter of a tradesman in Bath, Somerset, Harriet Waylett, née Cooke, was born there in 1798. Her uncle was a member of the Drury Lane Theatre company, and Sarah Cooke was her cousin. After receiving some instruction in music from John David Loder, she first appeared on the Bath stage on 16 March 1816 as Elvina in W. R. Hewetson's Blind Boy. She then acted at Coventry, where she met and married on 24 July 1819 Mr. Waylett, an actor in the company. In 1820 she was at the Adelphi Theatre, where she was the original Amy Robsart in James Planché's adaptation of Kenilworth, and the first Sue to her husband's Primefit in William Moncrieff's Tom and Jerry. She played as "Mrs. Waylett late Miss Cooke of Bath".

In 1823 she was acting in Birmingham under Alfred Bunn, playing in Sally Booth's part of Rose Briarly in Husbands and Wives. Her singing of Rest thee, Babe, in Guy Mannering established her in favour.

== On London and Dublin stages ==
On 24 February 1823 she was given a benefit evening at the Adelphi Theatre, Strand, of Tom and Jerry and she sang "Taste, oh! Taste this spice's wine" and "'Twas within a mile of Edinbro' town". She accompanied her manager Alfred Bunn to Drury Lane Theatre, with a reputation for chambermaid parts and as singer. She appeared as Madge in Love in a Village on 4 December 1824. On 14 January 1825 she played Mrs. Page in The Merry Wives of Windsor. However, she had incurred the jealousy of Bunn's wife, and shortly moved on.

On 12 May 1825, she played Zephyrina in The Lady and the Devil, her first appearance at the Haymarket Theatre. She stood in high favour as a singer and actress also in Dublin and Cork.

After her return from Dublin, Waylett played at the Haymarket, Drury Lane, Queen's Theatre, the Olympic Theatre, Covent Garden, and other houses. In 1832, she was acting at the Strand Theatre, where in 1834 she was sole manager. Here she also played original parts. The performances were nominally gratis: admission to the house was in fact by paying four shillings an ounce at a neighbouring shop for sweetmeats, or purchasing tickets for the Victoria Theatre. There were few London houses at which she was not seen, and she was a favourite in the country. In May 1833, she appeared at the King's Lynn theatre with Frederick Henry Yates of the Adelphi Theatre. In January 1834 she was appearing in the Theatre Royal, Dublin as Letitia Hardy, Phoebe in Paul Pry, False and Constant, The Haunted Tower, The Marriage of Figaro, and Clari, the Maid of Milan. In October 1835, she received in Dublin £800 and half a clear benefit for twenty-one nights' performances. In 1838, she was engaged again at the Haymarket.

== Last years ==
In May 1840, she and George Alexander Lee were due to appear at Fanny Robertson's Lincoln Theatre for four nights In December 1840, she was at the Reading theatre as Letitia Hardy in Belles Stratagem and as Mrs. Fitzwilliam in The Ladies Club. In August 1841, she sang in Barnaby Rudge and appeared in John of Paris with Mr. Keeley at the Theatre Royal English Opera House. In May 1843, Mrs. Waylett, as she was still called after her second marriage, was at the Lyceum Theatre, where she was the President in The Ladies' Club, and played in the farce of Matrimony. In November 1844, she was back on the Lincoln Circuit, this time performing at the Stamford theatre, assisted by Messrs Lee and Hammond, and the band of the Coldstream Guards. In March 1846, she, her husband, and Mrs. Malone Raymond supported Mr. Malone Raymond's entertainment at the Adelphi. Through ill-health her appearances became infrequent, and in 1849 she was spoken of as retired. She died in 1851 aged 53 after a long and painful illness. She was thought one of the best soubrettes of her day.

== Family and scandal ==
Harriet Waylett's life was associated with many scandals. Before her marriage she accompanied to London a Captain Dobyn, against whom her father brought an action Cooke vs Dobyn for loss of service. It was tried at Taunton in April 1819 and compromised.

Fulsome praise of her in the Theatrical Looker-On, a Birmingham newspaper associated in the mind of the Birmingham public with Alfred Bunn, gave rise to a crop of scandals. There were legal threats on Bunn's part, of prosecutions for libel. Bunn demanded an apology for what was said concerning the two as a couple in William Oxberry's Dramatic Biography in 1827. Oxberry refused to apologise, and there was talk of a duel. Waylett was taxed with ostentatiously overdressing the chambermaid parts in which she was seen.

Harriet had married the actor Waylett in 1819; he was a bigamist under the name Fitzwaylett. He appears to have remained on the stage. In 1824, a Mr. Fitzwaylett was on the Lincoln Circuit appearing at the Georgian Wisbech theatre (now the Angles Theatre) in The Way to Get Married as Captain Faulkner. He died in 1840, they had been long been separated. She afterwards married George Alexander Lee on 23 October 1845, in St-Martin-in-the-Fields, Westminster, he survived her a few months, dying on 8 October 1851, at the end of his days playing the piano for poses plastiques.
