= Elio Pecora =

Italian poet and writer

- Born: 5 April 1936 (age 90); Salerno, Italy
- Occupations: Poet, writer, journalist

Elio Pecora (born 5 April 1936) is an Italian poet and writer.

== Biography ==
Pecora was born in 1936 in Sant'Arsenio, in the province of Salerno, Italy.

He has published short stories, critical essays, novels, collections of poems, and has contributed literary criticism to various magazines and newspapers. He is the director of the magazine Poeti e Poesia, and has edited collections of contemporary poetry. He has received awards for his poetry, including the Dessi Award, the Le Muse International Award, the Mondello International Award among others.

Pecora's work, Interludo, was published in Rome by Empiria.

Pecora lives in Rome.
