= Elio Villate =

Cuban painter

Elio Fidel Villate Lam
- Born: November 1, 1957 (age 68); Pinar del Río, Cuba
- Education: Vocational Center of Arts, Pinar del Río; School of Fine Arts, Pinar del Río
- Known for: Painting

Elio Fidel Villate Lam (born 1 November 1957 in Pinar del Río, Cuba) is a Cuban painter.

Lam is a member of both the ACAA (Cuban Association of Craftsmen Artists) and the UNEAC (National Union of Writers and Artists of Cuba). Lam studied in 1969 at the Vocational Center of Arts of Pinar del Río. In 1972, he integrated the School of Fine Arts in the same city.

== Exhibitions ==
=== Collective exhibitions ===
- 1982 – Art of the Town, Nicaragua 1990
- 1982 – National Fair of Artisans, Cuba
- 1982 – Pinartesania Provincial Gallery Art, Cuba
- 1991 – Provincial Fine Arts Hall, Pinar del Río, Cuba
- 1991 – FIART 91, Awarded Cuba
- 1992 – Museum of Fine Arts, Cuba
- 1992 – Provincial Fine Arts Hall, Pinar del Río, Cuba
- 1993 – Fine Arts Hall 13 March, Cuba
- 1993 – The Biodiversity of the Nature: A valuable patrimony. (Supported by the FAO)

=== Cuba ===
- 1994 – Dreams for a Memory. (Tribute to Alfredo Sarabia), 23 and 12 Gallery, Cuba
- 1994 – Expo of the ACAA (National Hotel), Cuba
- 1995 – FITUR, Spain
- 1995 – Tourist Stock market of Mexico
- 1995 – FIART 95, Cuba
- 1995 – Art and Religion, Seat of the ACAA, Habana, Cuba
- 1995 – Carifesta, Trinidad and Tobago
- 1996 – Provincial Fine Arts Hall, Pinar del Río, Cuba
- 1997 – Fair"Popular Art", Concepción, Chile
- 1997 – FIART 97, Cuba
- 1997 – 15 Anniversary of the ACAA, Habana, Cuba
- 1998 – FITUR, Spain
- 1998 – Annual Exhibition"Pavilion of Culture" Expocuba, Havana, Cuba
- 1998 – National Hall "Tiburcio Lorenzo" UNEAC, Pinar del Río, Cuba
- 2001 – Seventh Biennial of Havana.
- 2001 – Expo "Domingo Gallery Register", Miami, USA
- 2001 – Expo "Alpha Gallery", Miami, USA
- 2001 – Auction "for Lights hope" Alpha International Gallery, Miami, USA
- 2002 – Expo"Artist Cuba" New Jersey, USA
- 2003 – "Los ruidos y las luces" abstract exhibition with the artist Jorge Luis Ballart. Hotel"Palacio O'farrill". Havana, Cuba
- 2005 -"Little paper boats" Domingo Padron Gallery. Miami, U.S.A.
- 2006 – Expo :"Urban testimonial" René Portocarrero's workshop. Havana, Cuba.

== Prizes and recognitions ==
- 1991 – Provincial Hall of Fine Arts, Pinar del Río, Cuba
- 1991 – First Prize of the Hall
- 1991 – Prize UNEAC
- 1993 – Prize ACAA
- 1993 – Provincial Hall of Fine Arts, Pinar del Río, Cuba
- 1993 – First Prize of the Hall
- 1993 – Prize Fondo cubano de Bienes Culturales, Havana, Cuba
- 1993 – Hall Fine Arts"13 March" – First Prize 2001
- 1993 – Recognition for the participation of the Artist in the"Dictionary of Contemporary Artists" and its contribution to disclose the Hispanic culture in the USA. Miami, Florida, USA

== Notes and references ==
- "MedaliaArt – Biography of Cuban Artist Elio Villate Lam". medalia.net. 2011. Archived from the original on 23 July 2011.
