= Izalene Tiene =

Brazilian social worker and politician

Personal details
- Born: 20 March 1943 (age 83) Valinhos, Brazil

Izalene Tiene (born 20 March 1943) is a Brazilian social worker and politician, affiliated to the Brazilian Worker's Party (PT).

In 2000 she was elected vice-Mayor of Campinas, on the ticket of Antonio da Costa Santos (Toninho). She took office on January 1, 2001, and became Mayor after Toninho's murder on September 10, 2001. Her term expired on December 31, 2004, and she chose not to run for a second term.
