= George Alexander Lee =

English composer

George Alexander Lee (1802 – 8 October 1851) was an English composer.

== Life ==
Lee was born in London, the son of Henry Lee, a pugilist and innkeeper. He became "tiger" to Lord Barrymore, and his singing led to his being educated for the musical profession. After appearing as a tenor at theatres in Dublin (1825) and London, he joined in producing opera at the Tottenham Street theatre in 1829, and afterwards was connected with musical productions at Drury Lane (1830, 1831) and Covent Garden (1831). He became conductor of the Royal Strand Theatre in 1832 and of the Olympic Theatre in 1845.

He married Harriet Waylett, a popular singer, on 23 October 1845 at St Martin-in-the Fields. She had been unwell but seemed to be making a recovery as a press report of July 1848 was optimistic of her making a return to the stage. Her death, on 26 April 1851, caused Lee a shock from which he never recovered.

He died at his lodgings in Newton Terrace, Kennington and was buried at West Norwood Cemetery.

== Works ==
Lee composed music for a number of plays and also many songs, including the popular "Come where the Aspens quiver", and for a short time had a music-selling business in the Quadrant. Many of his songs have Irish subject matter such as "Kate Kearney", "Maid of Kildare", "Old Irish Gentleman", and "Rose of Killarney", linking back to his time in Dublin the late 1820s. But he clearly had higher ambitions as his operatic works testify.

In 1886, J. D. Brown wrote of his songs: "Lee was great in his day as a ballad writer, and a few of his more popular works have survived. Among these "Macgregor's gathering" is by far the best known. Much of Lee's music was written to the verses of Haynes Bayly, and suffer accordingly; for the good sense of the public never fails to rise superior to all such lackadaisical twaddle."

== Selected compositions ==
=== Stage works: Operas, operettas, musical plays ===
- Malvina (1826)
- The Invincibles (1828)
- The Sublime and Beautiful (1829)
- The Nymph of the Grotto (1829)
- The Witness (1829)
- The Legion of Honour (1831)
- Love in a Cottage
- Auld Robin Gray
- The Fairy Lake
