= 1990 in Norway =

- Centuries: 18th; 19th; 20th; 21st
- Decades: 1970s; 1980s; 1990s; 2000s; 2010s
- See also: List of years in Norway

Events in the year 1990 in Norway.

== Incumbents ==
- Monarch: Olav V.
- Regent: Harald – latter half of the year
- Prime Minister: Jan P. Syse (Conservative Party) until 3 November, Gro Harlem Brundtland (Labour Party)

== Events ==
- 1 January – The Confederation of Norwegian Enterprise is founded as a merger of the Federation of Norwegian Industries, the Norwegian Employers' Confederation and the Federation of Norwegian Craftsmen.
- 8 April – Passenger Ferry MS Scandinavian Star catches fire en route from Norway to Denmark. 159 people are killed in the event.
- 15 April – Miss Norway Mona Grudt is crowned Miss Universe in Los Angeles, USA.
- 3 November –
  - Gro Harlem Brundtland becomes Prime Minister of Norway for the third time
  - Brundtland's Third Cabinet was appointed.
  - Population Census: 4,247,546 inhabitants in Norway.
- Flekkefjord Line railway line closes (opened in 1904).

== Notable births ==
=== January ===
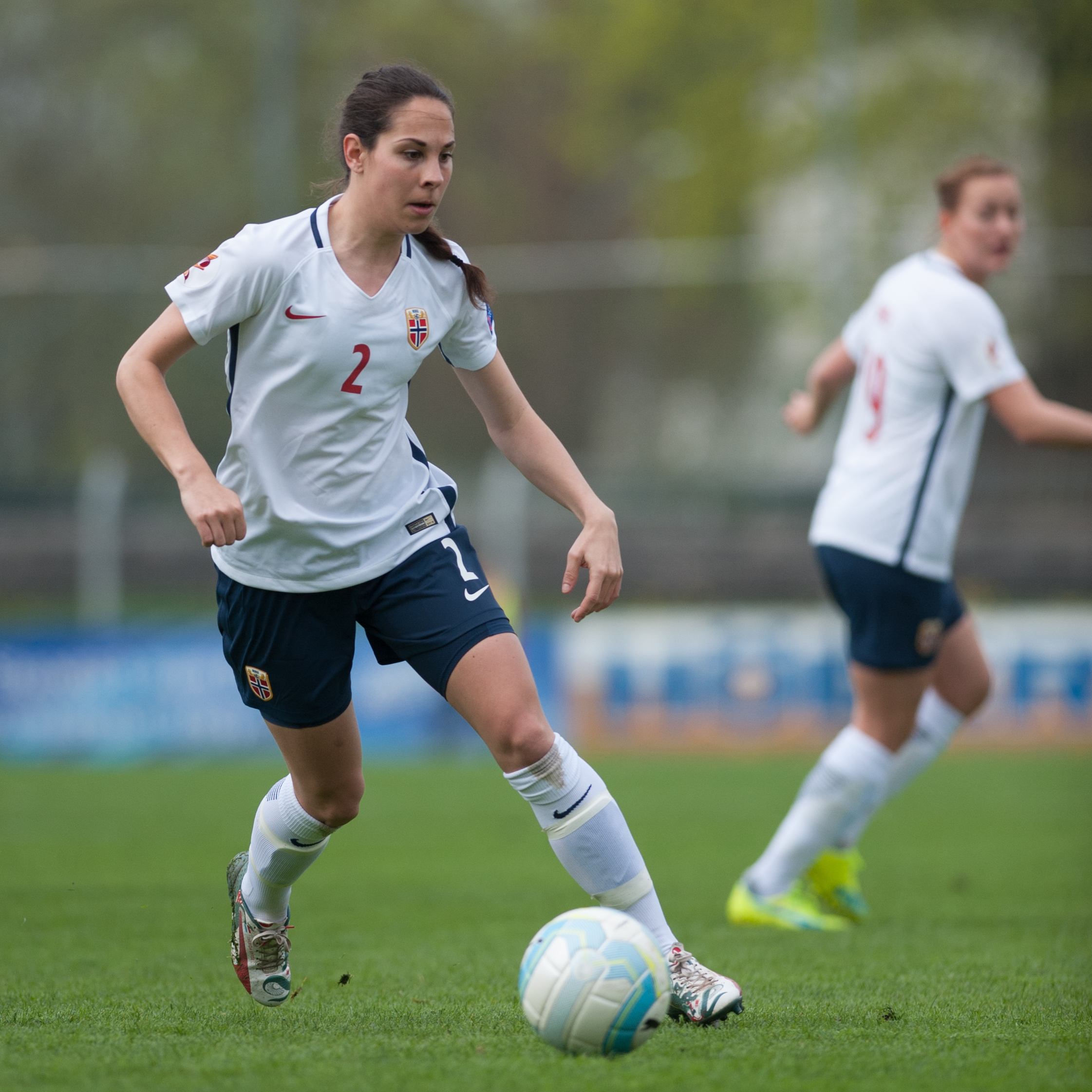
Ingrid Moe Wold

- 4 January – Pål André Helland, footballer
- 5 January – Ole Amund Sveen, footballer
- 6 January – Kristian Opseth, footballer
- 10 January – Amin Nouri, footballer
- 12 January – Sabri Khattab, footballer
- 29 January – Ingrid Moe Wold, footballer

=== February ===
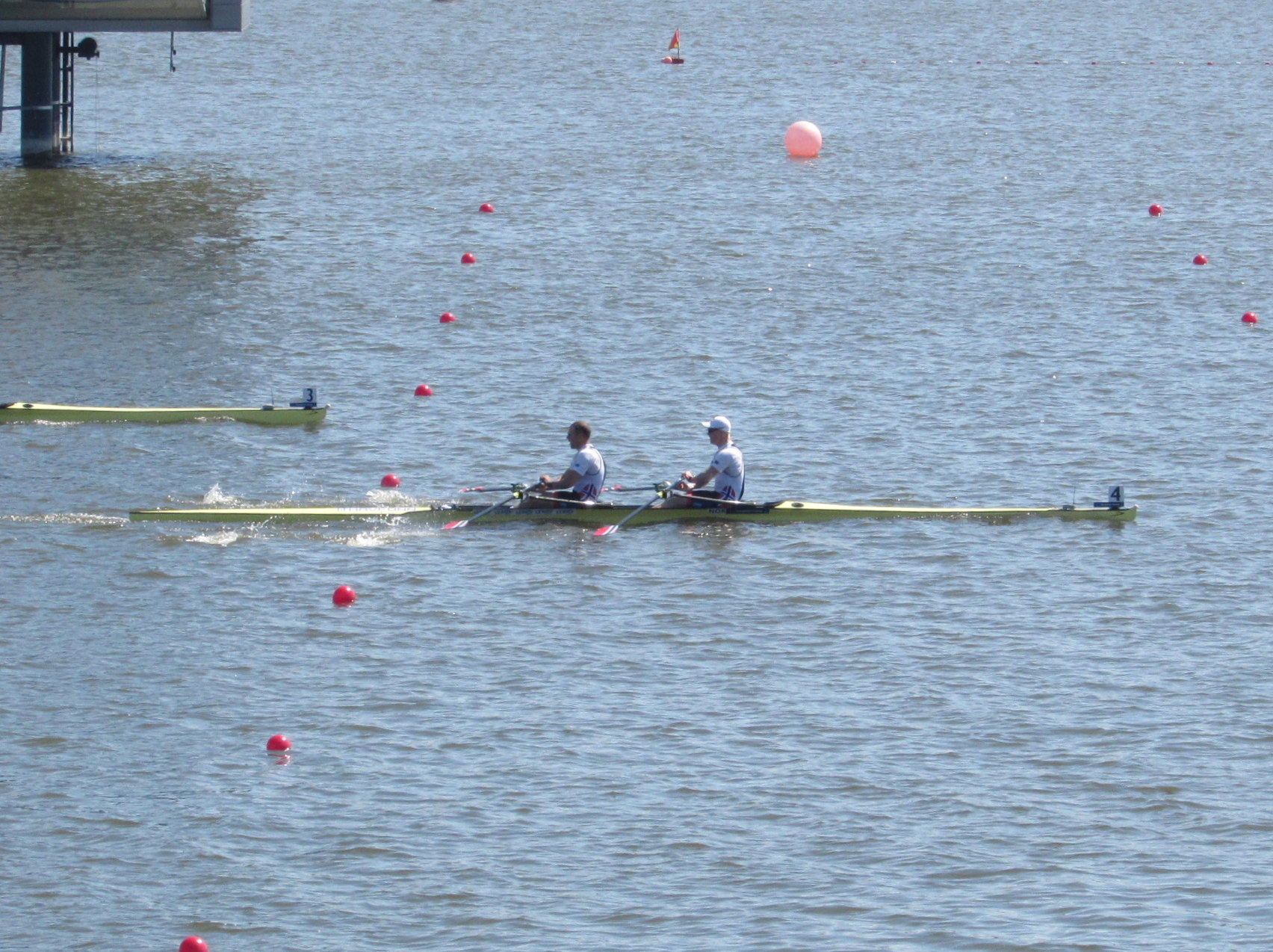
Kjetil Borch

- 2 February – Patrik Svendsen, musician
- 3 February – Michael Karlsen, footballer
- 14 February –
  - Kjetil Borch, rower.
  - Adama Diomande, footballer
- 15 February –
  - Fredrik Lystad Jacobsen, ice hockey player
  - Anders Karlsen, footballer
- 19 February – Elise Bjørnebekk-Waagen, politician.
- 22 February – Didrik Bastian Juell, freestyle skier.
- 27 February – Line Kloster, sprinter.

=== March ===
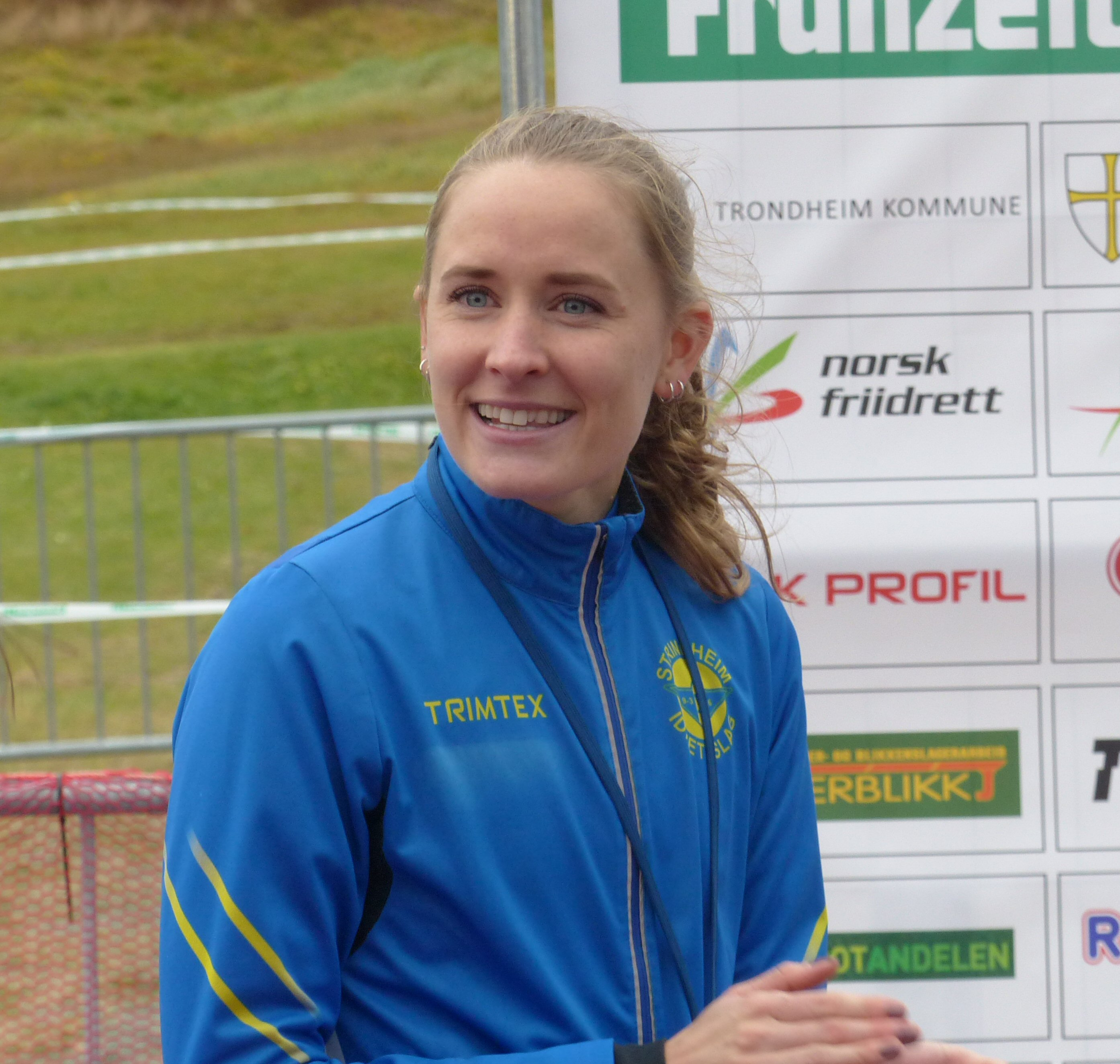
Hedda Hynne

- 1 March – Edwin Kjeldner, footballer
- 6 March – Linn Haug, snowboarder
- 9 March – Bendik Bye, footballer
- 13 March – Hedda Hynne, middle-distance runner
- 14 March –
  - Vegar Gjermundstad, footballer
  - Christian Grøvlen, classical pianist
- 15 March –
  - Julie Jensen, freestyle skier
  - Mads Stokkelien, footballer
- 17 March – Anders Kristiansen, footballer
- 20 March – Christine Spiten, engineer
- 25 March – Alexandra Joner, singer and dancer
- 31 March – Morten Sundli, footballer

=== April ===
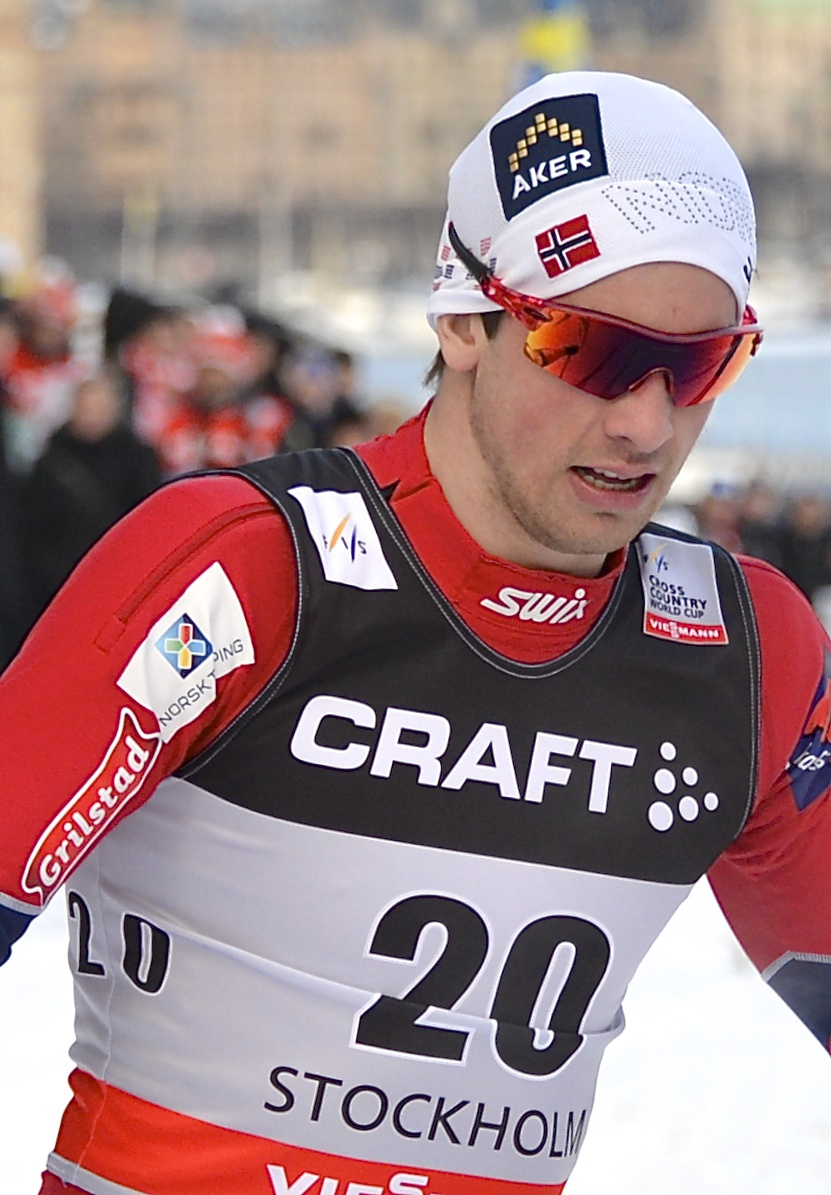
Tomas Northug

- 4 April – Ine Karlsen Stangvik, handball player
- 16 April –
  - Linnéa Myhre, author and blogger
- 18 April – Lars Stubhaug, footballer
- 19 April –
  - Espen Lysdahl, alpine skier
  - Tomas Northug, cross-country skier
  - Eirik Ulltang, trials rider
- 22 April – Håvard Haukenes, racewalker.

=== May ===
- 8 May – Ingebjørg Bratland, folk ainger
- 9 May – Hanne Leland, electro-pop artist and songwriter
- 24 May – Sofie Marhaug, politician.

=== June ===
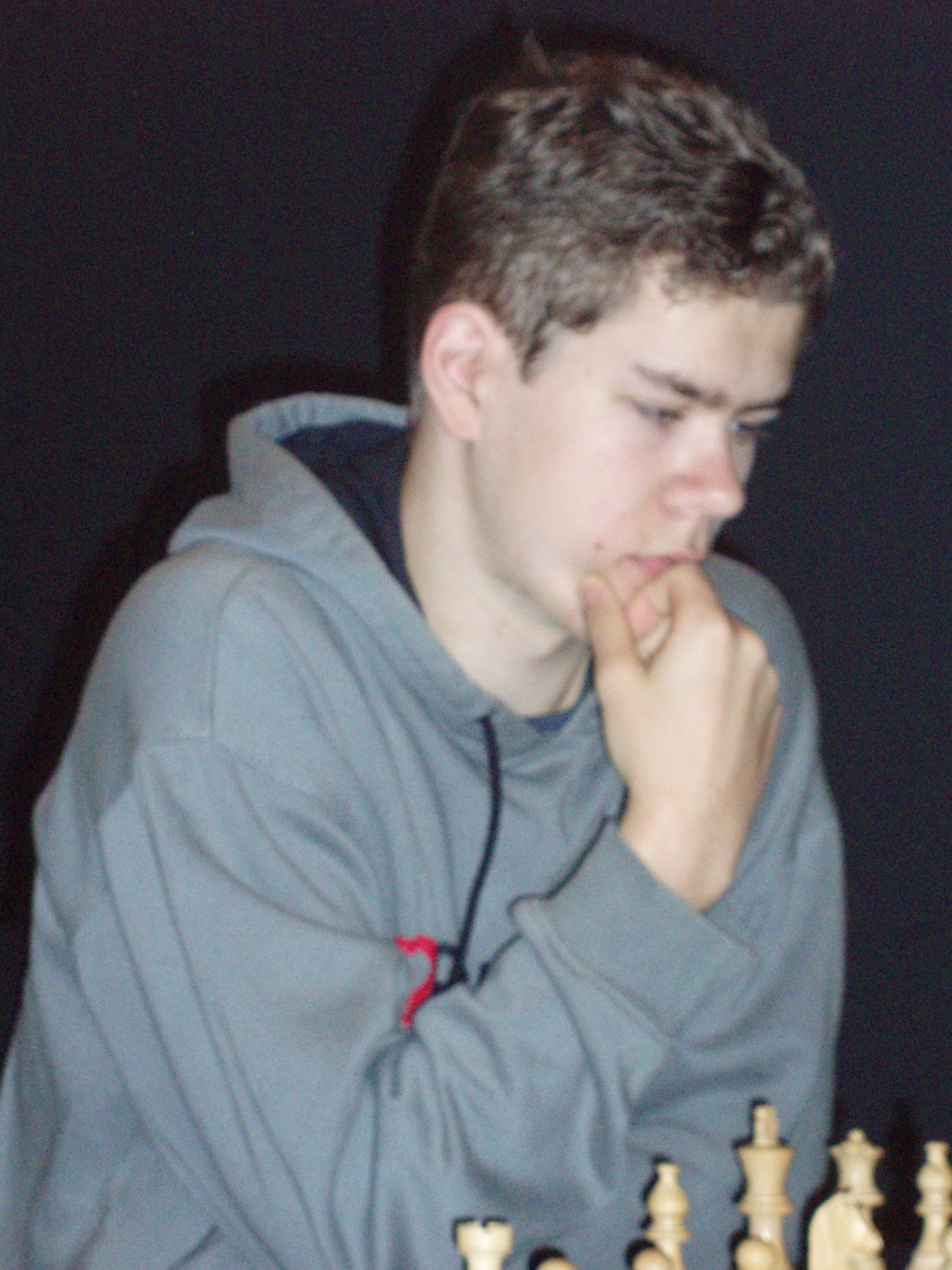
Jon Ludvig Hammer

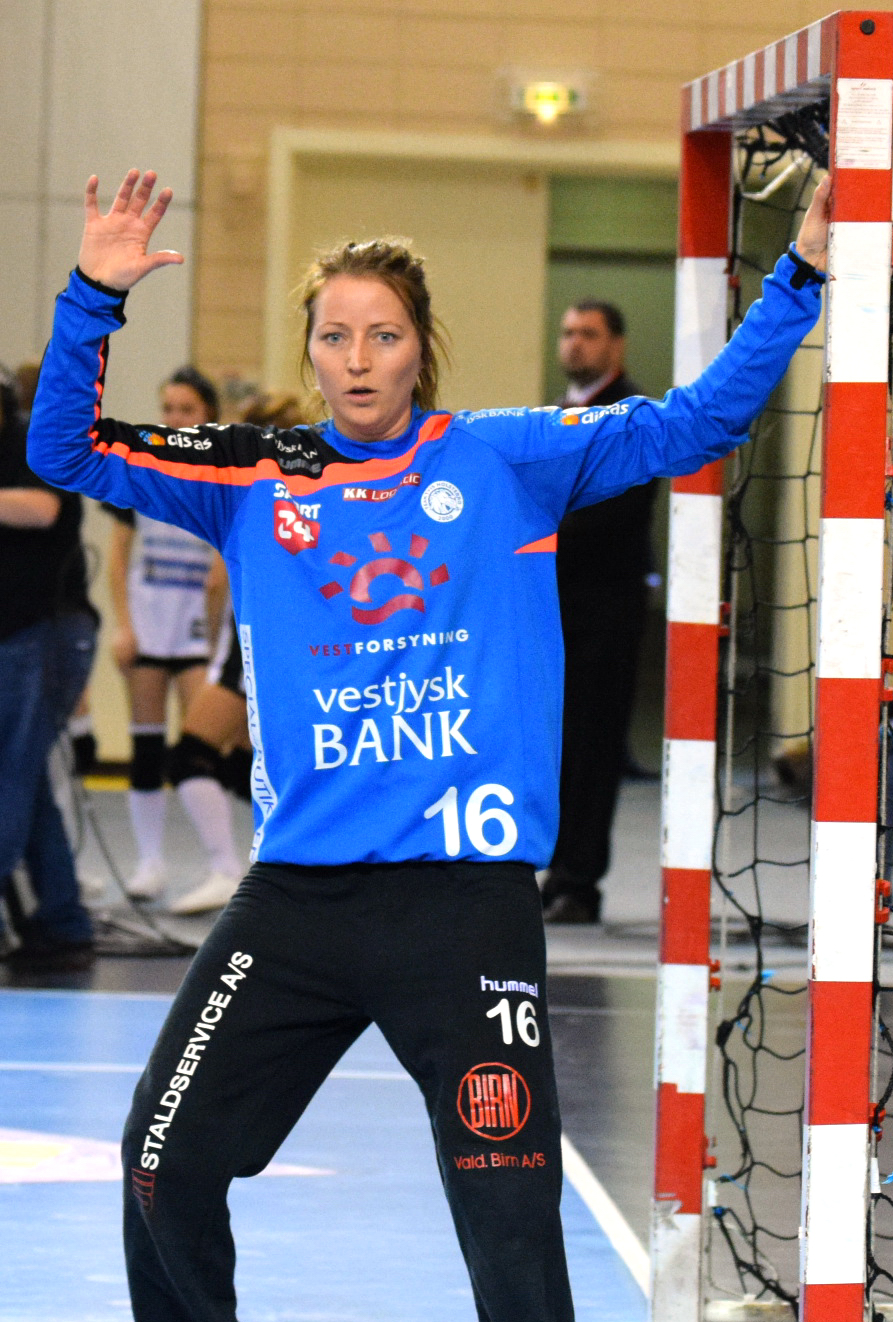
Silje Solberg

- 2 June – Jon Ludvig Hammer, chess player
- 4 June – Gøran Sørheim, handball player
- 8 June – Marcus Pedersen, footballer
- 13 June – Kristian Brix, footballer
- 14 June – Karoline Bjerkeli Grøvdal, long-distance runner.
- 16 June –
  - Sanna Solberg, handball player.
  - Silje Solberg, handball player.
- 18 June – Amahl Pellegrino, footballer
- 19 June – Isak Scheel, footballer
- 20 June – Iselin Solheim, singer and songwriter
- 21 June –
  - Håvard Nordtveit, footballer
  - Lisa Johansen Persheim, handball player
- 29 June – Thomas Rogne, footballer

=== July ===
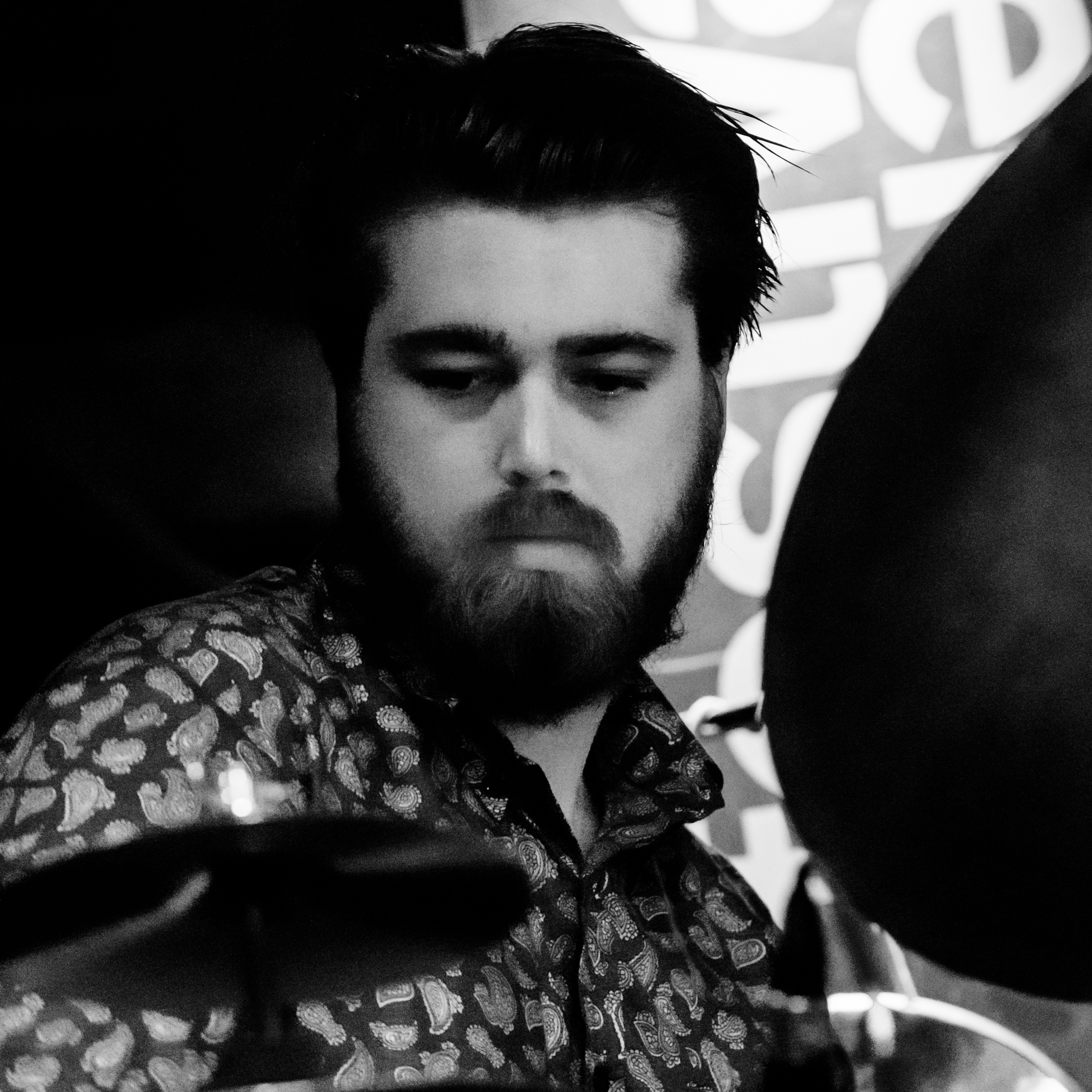
Ole Mofjell

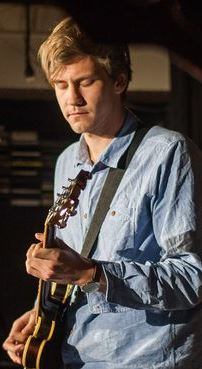
Torgeir Standal

- 1 July – Endre Kupen, footballer
- 8 July – Martin Thømt Jensen, footballer
- 10 July – Veronica Kristiansen, handball player.
- 11 July – Ole Mofjell, drummer
- 13 July – Elias Angell Spikseth, cyclist
- 16 July – Vinjar Slåtten, freestyle skier
- 18 July – Anders Konradsen, footballer
- 21 July – Eirik Valla Dønnem, footballer
- 23 July –
  - Dagny Norvoll Sandvik, singer
  - Torgeir Standal, jazz guitarist
- 25 July – Stefan Strandberg, footballer
- 30 July – Erlend Bjøntegaard, biathlete.

=== August ===
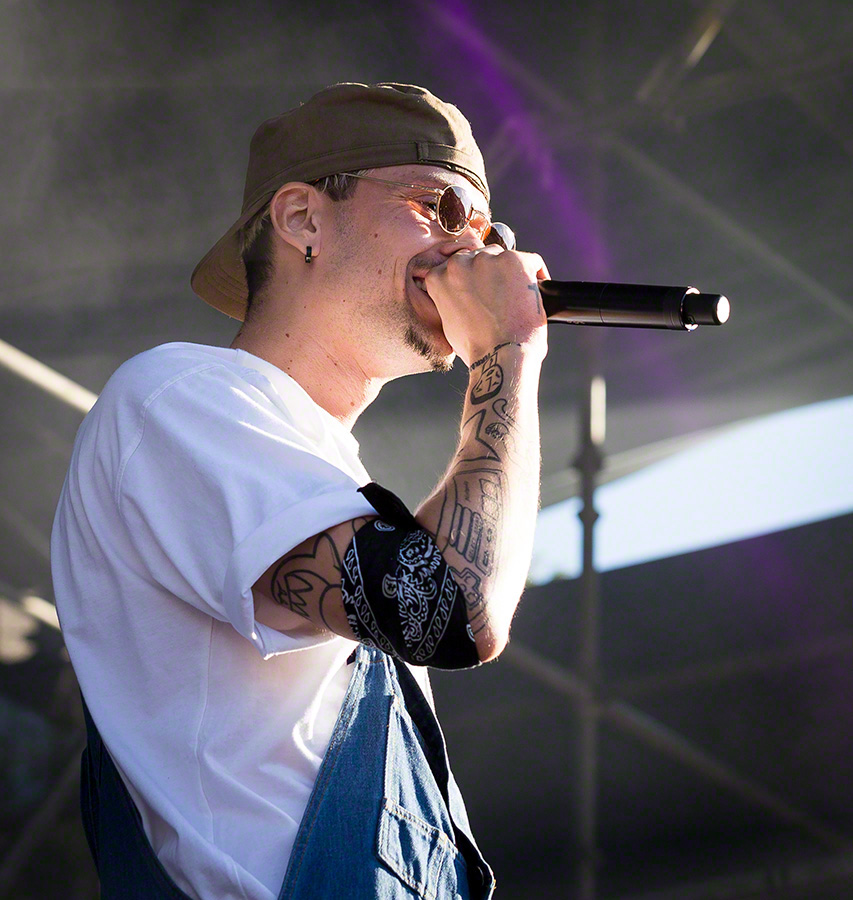
Unge Ferrari

- 2 August – Unge Ferrari, musician
- 4 August – Simen Raaen Sandmæl, footballer
- 5 August – Anna Molberg, politician.
- 8 August –
  - Magnus Wolff Eikrem, footballer
  - Mari Molid, handball player
- 19 August – Tobias Vibe, footballer
- 20 August –
  - Audun Fløtten, cyclist
  - Benjamin Stokke, footballer

=== September ===
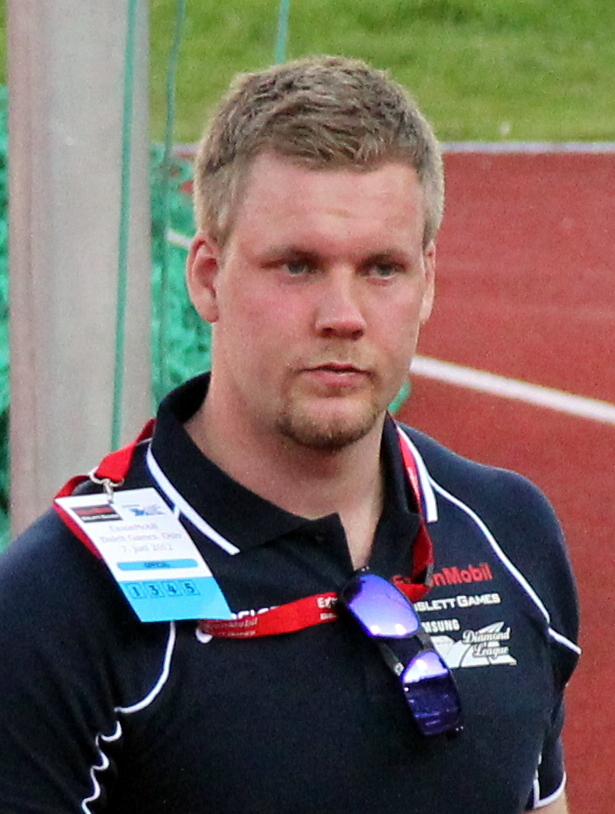
Eivind Henriksen

- 4 September – Remi Johansen, footballer
- 6 September – Henrik Holm, ice hockey player
- 10 September – Ørjan Nyland, footballer
- 11 September – Jo Inge Berget, footballer
- 14 September – Eivind Henriksen, athlete.
- 20 September – Marta Tomac, handball player.

=== October ===
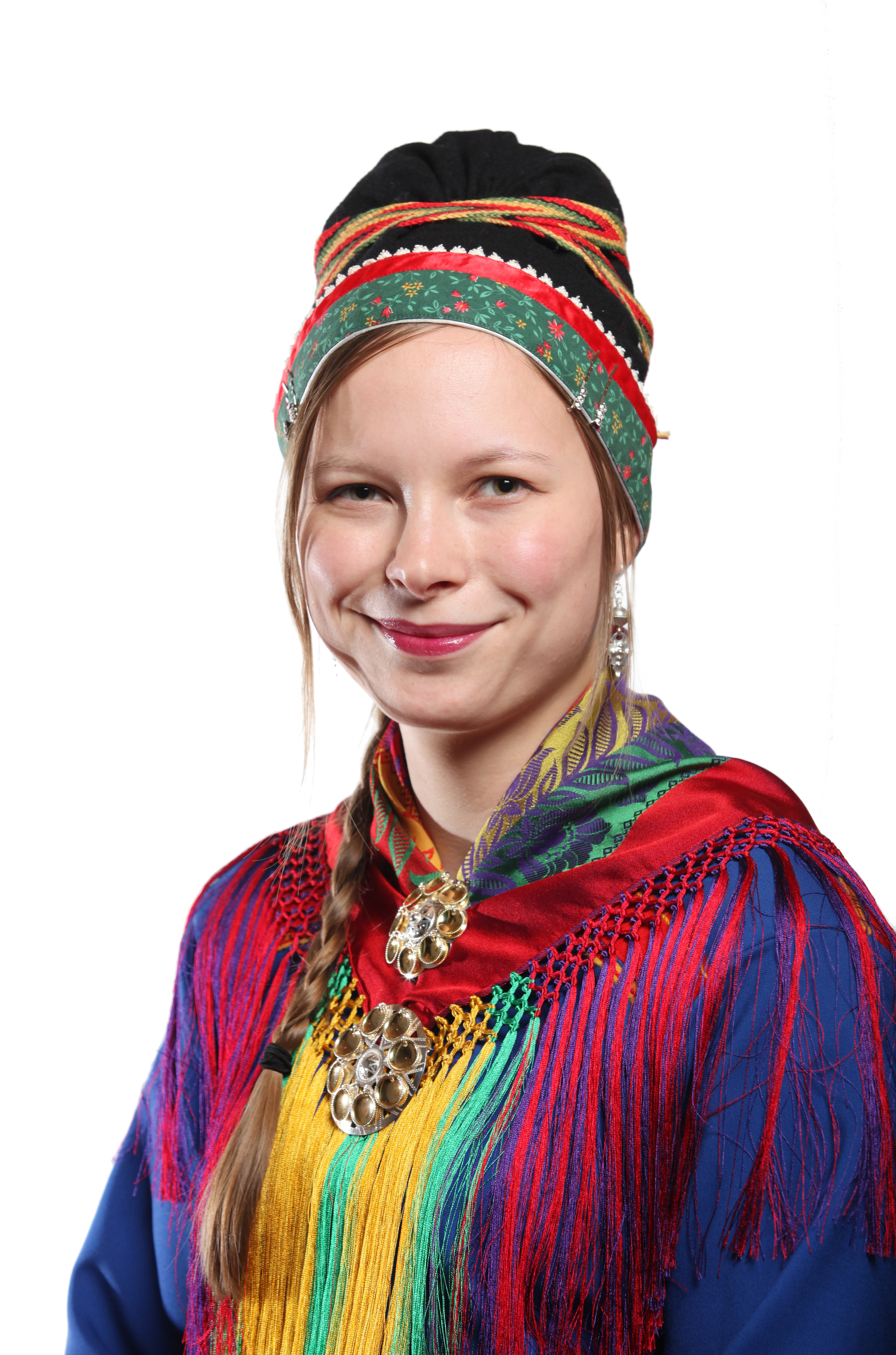
Sandra Márjá West

- 2 October – Mix Diskerud, footballer
- 3 October – Sivert Bjørnstad, politician
- 11 October – Sandra Márjá West, Sami politician
- 14 October – Jonas Djupvik Løvlie, ice hockey player
- 15 October – Sondre Justad, musician and songwriter
- 24 October – Hege Hansen, footballer
- 25 October – Marthe Wang, singer-songwriter

=== November ===
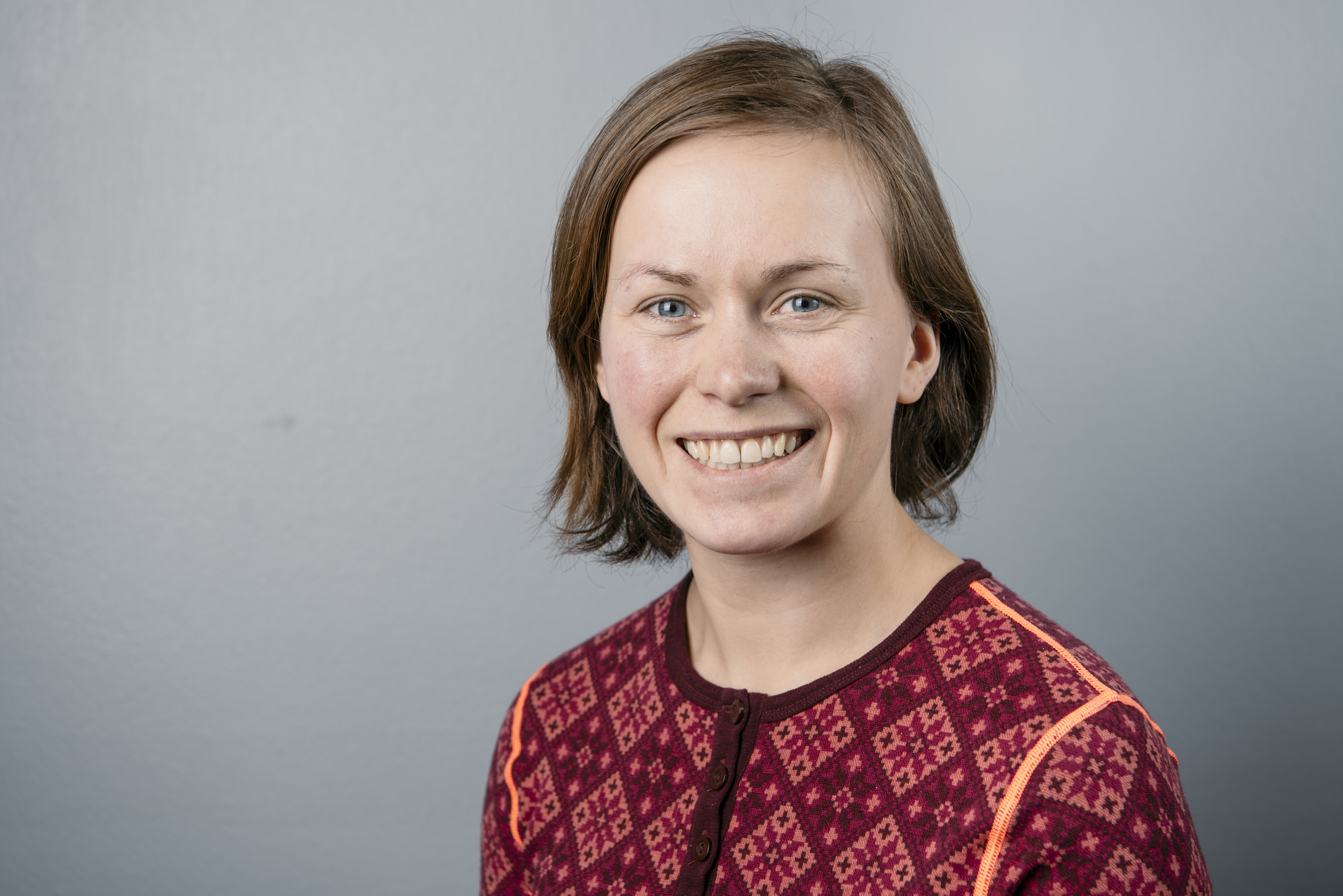
Solfrid Lerbrekk

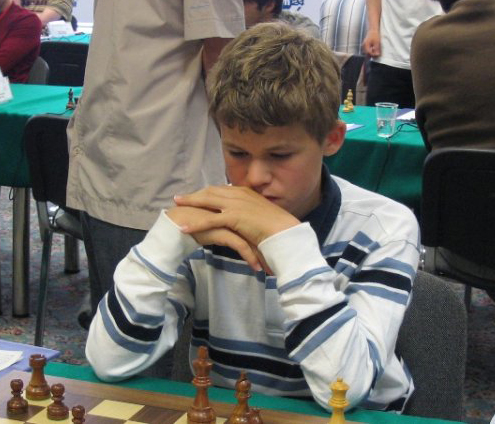
Magnus Carlsen

- 10 November – Pål Alexander Kirkevold, footballer
- 12 November – Harmeet Singh, footballer
- 14 November – Mathis Bolly, footballer
- 27 November – Jonas Rønningen, footballer
- 29 November – Solfrid Lerbrekk, politician.
- 30 November – Magnus Carlsen, chess player

=== December ===
- 7 December – Marte Olsbu Røiseland, biathlete.
- 10 December – Villiam Strøm, ice hockey player

=== Full date missing ===
- Charlotte Dos Santos, jazz singer and composer
- Freddy Kalas, singer
- Bente Landheim, biathlete.

== Notable deaths ==
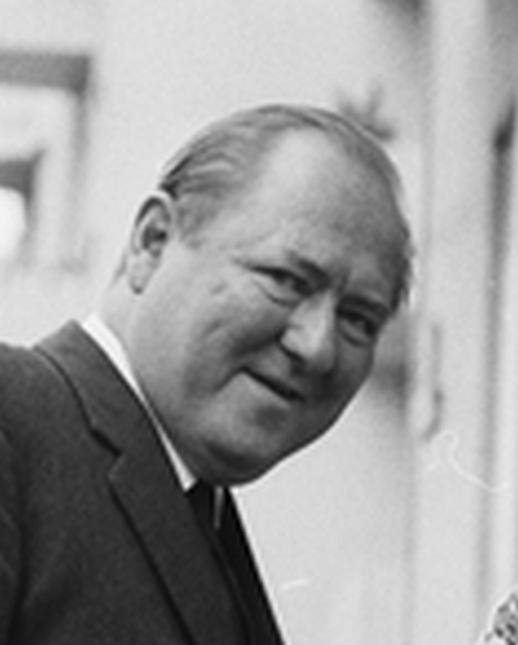
Carsten Byhring

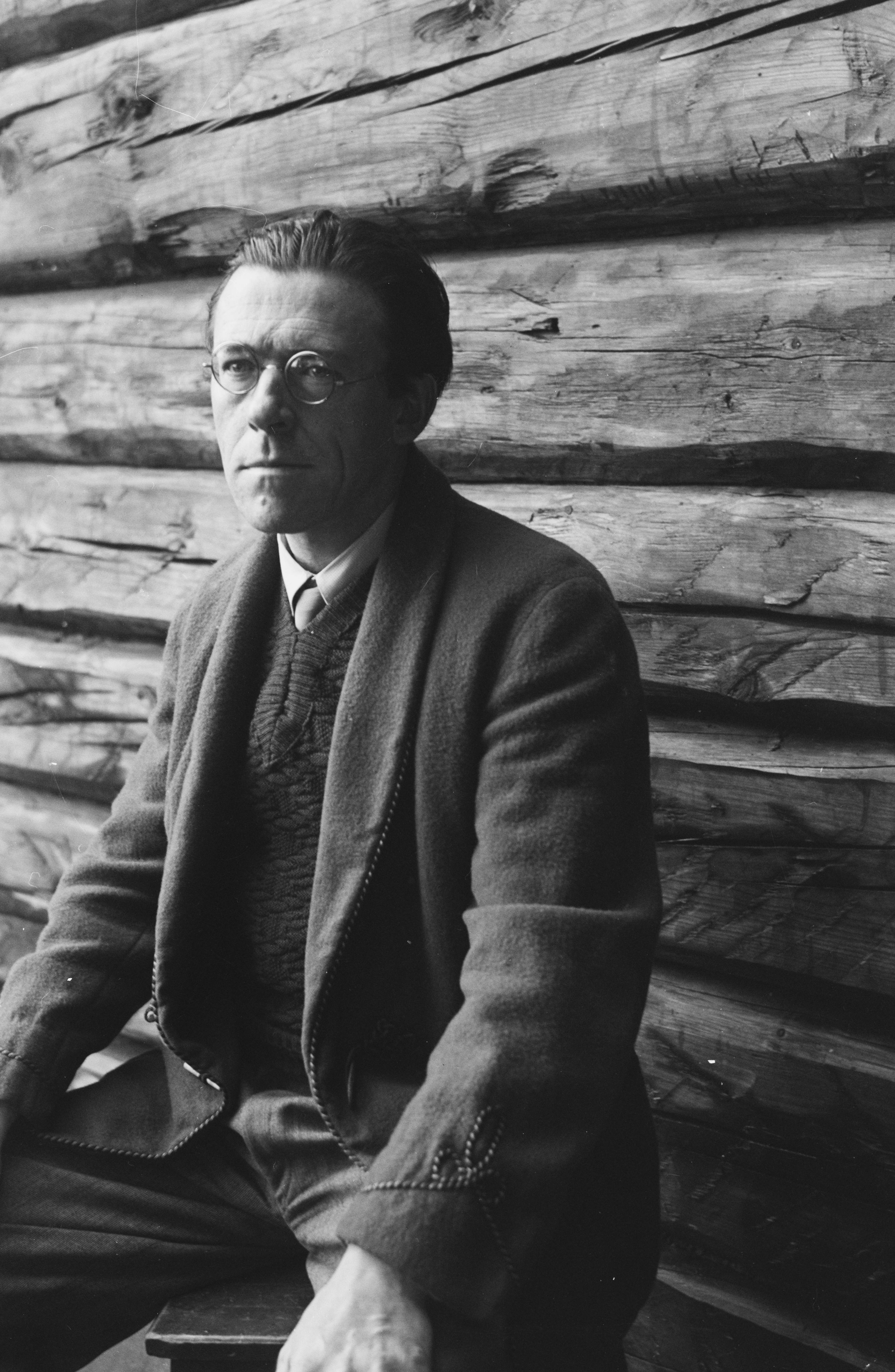
Peter Wessel Zapffe

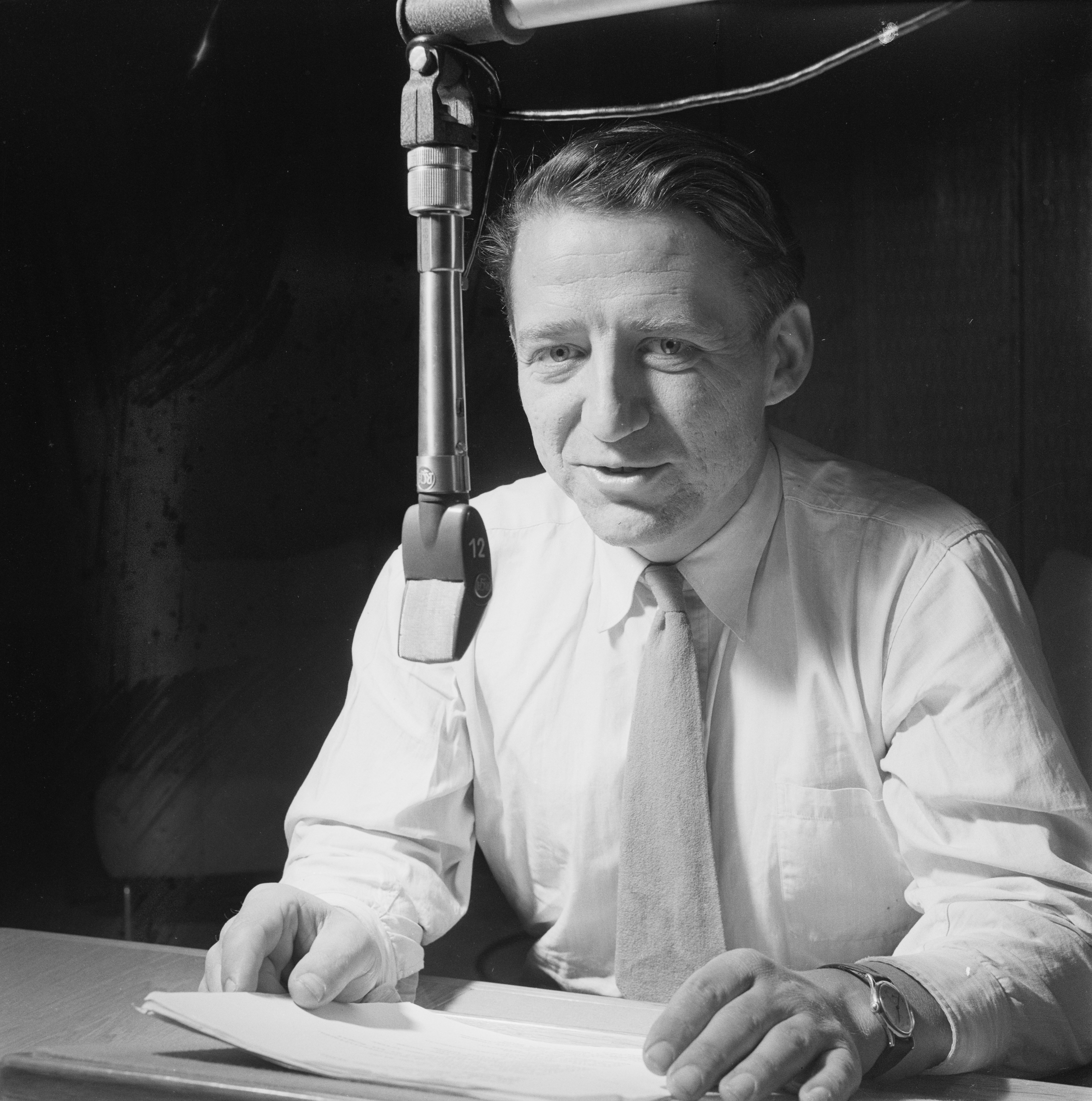
Thorbjørn Egner

- 1 January – Ingvald Bjerke, boxer (b.1907)
- 2 February – Sigbjørn Bernhoft Osa, folk musician, fiddler (b.1910).
- 7 February – Anna Sofie Herland, politician (b.1913)
- 28 February – Camilla Carlson, writer (born 1930).
- 22 March – Eivind Holmsen, sport shooter (b.1894)
- 6 April – Carsten Byhring, actor (b.1918)
- 9 April – Astrid Sommer, actress (born 1906).
- 12 April – Borghild Bondevik Haga, politician (b.1906)
- 14 April – Alv Kjøs, politician (b.1894)
- 13 May – Arnljot Karstein Eidnes, politician (b.1909)
- 13 June – Gidsken Jakobsen, aviation pioneer (b.1908)
- 27 June – Olav Benum, politician (b.1896)
- 15 July – Magnus Jensen, historian and educator (born 1902).
- 19 July – Egil Aarvik, politician (b.1912)
- 27 July – Rolf Andersen, politician (b.1916)
- 1 August – Roar Berthelsen, long jumper (b.1934)
- 25 August – Ingvarda Røberg, politician (b.1895)
- 12 September – Kjellaug Hølaas, textile artist and educator (born 1906).
- 26 September – Charles Philipson, judge and civil servant (b. 1928).
- 10 October – Erling Gjone, architect (born 1898).
- 12 October – Leif Larsen, naval officer (b.1906)
- 12 October – Peter Wessel Zapffe, author and philosopher (b.1899)
- 21 October – Eugen Haugland, triple jumper (b.1912)
- 29 October – Albert Andreas Mørkved, politician (b.1898)
- 3 November – Ellen Francke, poet, novelist, playwright (born 1943).
- 4 November – Håkon Melberg, linguist (b.1911)
- 7 November – Sigurd Monssen, rower and Olympic bronze medallist (b.1902).
- 8 November – Nils Reinhardt Christensen, film director and screenwriter (b.1919)
- 21 December – Per Høybråten, politician (b.1932)
- 22 December – Claus Marius Neergaard, politician (b.1911)
- 24 December – Thorbjørn Egner, playwright, songwriter and illustrator (b.1912)
- 27 December – Kåre Rønning, politician (b.1929)

=== Date unknown ===
- Sigurd Anderson, nineteenth Governor of South Dakota (b.1904)
- Karl Egil Aubert, mathematician (b.1924)
- Per Bergersen, musician (b.1960)
- Arne Dagfin Dahl, military officer (b.1894)
- Inger Koppernæs, politician and Minister (b.1928)
- Odd Kvaal Pedersen, journalist, author and translator (b.1935)
- Niels Werring, shipowner (b.1897)
