= 1990 in Norwegian music =

The following is a list of notable events and releases of the year 1990 in Norwegian music.

== Events ==
=== April ===
- 6 – The 17th Vossajazz started in Vossavangen, Norway (April 6 – 8).

=== May ===
- 23 – The 18th Nattjazz started in Bergen, Norway (May 23 – June 3).

=== June ===
- 28 – The 21st Kalvøyafestivalen started at Kalvøya near by Oslo (June 30 – July 1).

=== August ===
- 24 – The 3rd Notodden Blues Festival started in Notodden (August 24 – 26).

== Albums released ==
=== Unknown date ===
A

Arild Andersen

- Sagn (Kirkelig Kulturverksted)

G

Jan Garbarek

- I Took Up the Runes (ECM Records)

== Deaths ==
February

- 2 – Sigbjørn Bernhoft Osa, Hardanger fiddler and traditional folk musician (born 1910).

June

- 28 – Per Bergersen, songwriter and illustrator, murder victim (born 1960).

December

- 24 – Thorbjørn Egner, playwright, songwriter and illustrator (born 1912).

== Births ==
January

- 4 – Bjørn Johan Muri, pop singer.

February

- 2 – Patrik Svendsen, heavy metal vocalist, rhythm guitarist, songwriter, and music producer, Tonic Breed.
- 16 – Eldbjørg Hemsing, classical and traditional folk violinist.

Mars

- 25 – Alexandra Joner, pop singer.

May

- 8 – Ingebjørg Bratland, folk singer, kveder and artist.
- 9 – Hanne Leland, electro-pop artist and songwriter.

June

- 20 – Iselin Solheim, singer and songwriter.

July

- 11 – Ole Mofjell, jazz drummer.
- 23
  - Dagny Norvoll Sandvik, pop singer.
  - Torgeir Standal, jazz guitarist

October

- 25 – Marthe Wang, Norwegian singer and songwriter.

November

- 27 – Mette Henriette, independent saxophonist, improviser and autodidact composer.

Unknown date

- Charlotte Dos Santos, jazz vocalist, composer, and arranger.

== See also ==
- 1990 in Norway
- Music of Norway
- Norway in the Eurovision Song Contest 1990
