= 1960 in Norwegian music =

The following is a list of notable events and releases of the year 1960 in Norwegian music.

== Events ==
=== May ===
- The 8th Bergen International Festival started in Bergen, Norway.

== Births ==
January

- 19 – Anders Vangen, operatic singer (died 2013).
- 20 – Nils Henrik Asheim, composer and organist.

March

- 7 – Atle Bakken, composer, keyboardist, and record producer.
- 22 – Tore Andersen, country musician (died 2015).
- 25 – Ingor Ánte Áilo Gaup, Sami yoiker, actor, and composer.

April

- 28 – Rolf Graf, singer, bass guitarist, composer, and record producer (died 2013).

May

- 20 – Tore Brunborg, jazz saxophonist and composer.

June

- 6 – Frank Hovland, rock bassist and record producer, Program 81/82.
- 8 – Terje Gewelt, jazz upright bassist.
- 22 – Martin Hagfors, vocalist, guitarist, and songwriter.

July

- 15 – Stig Hvalryg, jazz upright bassist.
- 20 – Ole Jacob Hystad, jazz tenor saxophonist and clarinetist.

August

- 23 – Wolfgang Plagge, composer and pianist.

September

- 18 – Nils Petter Molvær, jazz trumpeter, composer, and record producer.

October

- 1 – Per Bergersen, musician (died 1990).
- 26 – Arne Berggren, novelist, children's writer, songwriter and rock musician.

== See also ==
- 1960 in Norway
- Music of Norway
