= Kåre Thomsen =

- Born: 30 December 1959 (age 66); Bergen, Norway
- Genres: Jazz
- Occupations: Musician, graphic designer
- Instrument: Guitar
- Website: www.designregionbergen.no/bruker/336

Kåre Thomsen (born 30 December 1959) is a Norwegian Jazz musician (guitar) and graphic designer, known for a number of releases and is active on the Bergen jazz scene performing with musicians like Karl Seglem, Vigleik Storaas and Terje Isungset. He is the younger brother of the acclaimed Bergen guitarist Ole Thomsen.

== Career ==
Thomsen was born in Bergen. When growing up, he was inspired by Jazz fusion and played in bands like "Rabies" (including drummer Atle Garmann & bassist Knut Vaksdal), and "One Step Limbo" together with Program 81/82 vocalist Kate Augestad and bassist Frank Hovland among others,

In 1987 Thomsen appeared on the show "Nattsang" at NRK, with the band "Growl", comprising Karl Seglem (saxophone), Vigleik Storaas (piano), Odd Magne Gridseth (bass) and Terje Isungset (drums). Thomsen within an eight men strong guitarist happening (Mats Grønner, Ronny Heimdal, Morten Sæle, Kato Ådland, Reinhardt Døskeland, Mads Eriksen and Jan Ove Nordeide in addition) appeared with brother Ole Thomsen's band "Electric Heavyland" (Frank Jakobsen, Øivind Lunde, Harald Dahlstrøm, in addition to his brother) performing a concert at Nattjazz in 1993. In addition Thomsen has several performances at the Bergen Jazz Festival Nattjazz. Within the band "Tundra" (1984), "Growl" (1986–87), "Poems for Trio" (1986–93, 1989–91 with Frode Rasmussen), "Hip Slippers" (1991), and "Frank's Friends N'Loose Ends" (1993).

== Discography ==
=== As musical performer ===
With Karl Seglem

- 1988: Poems For Trio (Hot Club Records)
- 1991: Sogn-A-Song (NorCD)

With Ole Amund Gjersvik

- 1990: Voice From the Past

=== As photo designer ===
- 2010 – Karl Seglem: Ossicles (Ozella Music)
