= 1980 in Norwegian music =

The following is a list of notable events and releases of the year 1980 in Norwegian music.

== Events ==
=== March ===
- 28 – The 7th Vossajazz started in Vossavangen, Norway (March 28 – 30).

=== April ===
- 19 – Norway was represented by Sverre Kjelsberg and Mattis Hætta, with the song '"Sámiid Ædnan", at the 1980 Eurovision Song Contest.

=== May ===
- 21
  - The 28th Bergen International Festival started in Bergen, Norway (May 21 – June 4).
  - The 8th Nattjazz started in Bergen, Norway (May 21 – June 4).

=== June ===
- 29 – The 12th Kalvøyafestivalen started at Kalvøya near by Oslo.

=== Unknown date ===
- The pop duo Dollie de Luxe established, consisting of Benedicte Adrian and Ingrid Bjørnov.
- The band Vazelina Bilopphøggers was established in Gjøvik.

== Albums released ==
=== Unknown date ===
A

The Aller Værste!

- Materialtretthet (Den Gode Hensikt)

E

Jan Eggum

- Alarmen Går (Philips Records)

G

Jan Garbarek

- Magico (ECM Records), with Charlie Haden and Egberto Gismonti
- Aftenland (ECM Records), with Kjell Johnsen

R

Inger Lise Rypdal

- Sign Language (RCA Victor)

Terje Rypdal

- Descendre (ECM Records)

== Deaths ==
October

- 26 – Bjørn Fongaard, composer, guitarist, and teacher (born 1919).

December

- 8 – Sverre Bergh, composer and pianist (born 1915).

== Births ==
January

- 3 – David Arthur Skinner, British jazz pianist and composer, living in Norway.
- 15 – Christoffer Andersen, blues guitarist.

March

- 2 – Ingrid Bolsø Berdal, singer and actress.
- 10 – Lars Horntveth, multi-instrumentalist, composer, and band leader, Jaga Jazzist.

May

- 5 – Stian Omenås, jazz trumpeter, music conductor, and composer

July

- 4 – Thomas J. Bergersen, composer and multi-instrumentalist.
- 11 – Jenny Hval, musician, singer, songwriter, lyricist and writer.

August

- 16 – Øystein Moen, jazz pianist and keyboarder, Puma and Jaga Jazzist.
- 25 – Pål Hausken, jazz drummer, In the Country.

September

- 3 – Jørgen Munkeby, jazz and heavy metal singer, multi-instrumentalist, and songwriter, Shining.
- 25 – Christina Bjordal, jazz singer.

October

- 3 – Kjetil Mørland, singer and songwriter.
- 17 – Siri Wålberg, musical artist performing as Sissy Wish.

November

- 6 – Lena Nymark, jazz singer and music teacher.
- 25 – Silje Nes, multi-instrumentalist, singer, and songwriter.
- 28 – Kim André Arnesen, composer.

December

- 9 – Anton Eger, jazz drummer.
- 28 – Andreas Amundsen, jazz bassist.

== See also ==
- 1980 in Norway
- Music of Norway
- Norway in the Eurovision Song Contest 1980
