= Kate Augestad =

- Born: Kate Elisabeth Augestad; 1956 (age 69–70); Bergen, Norway
- Genres: Rock
- Occupations: Musician, actor
- Instrument: Vocals

Kate Elisabeth Augestad (born 1956) is a Norwegian vocalist known from bands like Johnny Banan Band and Program 81/82, and the mother of mezzo-soprano, vocalist, actress and conductor Tora Augestad (b. 1979).

Augestad was born in Bergen. After her singing career, she became assistant professor at University of Bergen, Department of Information Science and Media Studies, and "Handelshøyskolen BI" in Bergen. She has also appeared as an actor at Den Nationale Scene in Bergen.

== Musical career ==
Augestad and Lasse Myrvold (1953–2006) were lead vocalists in the band "Johnny Banan Band", which later became The Aller Værste!. They were among the driving forces in the so-called Bergen Wave. On the "Program 82" album Pictures (1982) the sound was synth-based in the direction of post punk à la Japan.

Augestad was also part of the band "Poplins", with Arne Moe Vindedal, Frank Hovland and Lasse Myrvold from "TAV!". Together with Lars Ove Toft, Kåre Thomsen, Hovland and Arne Moe Vindedal, she formed the band "One Step Limbo" (1990).

== Discography ==
- 1982: Pictures (Norwegian Label)
- 1983: Unleash (Pro-Gram O'Phone3)
- 2006: Dans Til Musikken (Reel Noise Records), tribute to Lasse Myrvold
