= Sverre Knudsen =

Norwegian writer and musician (born 1955)

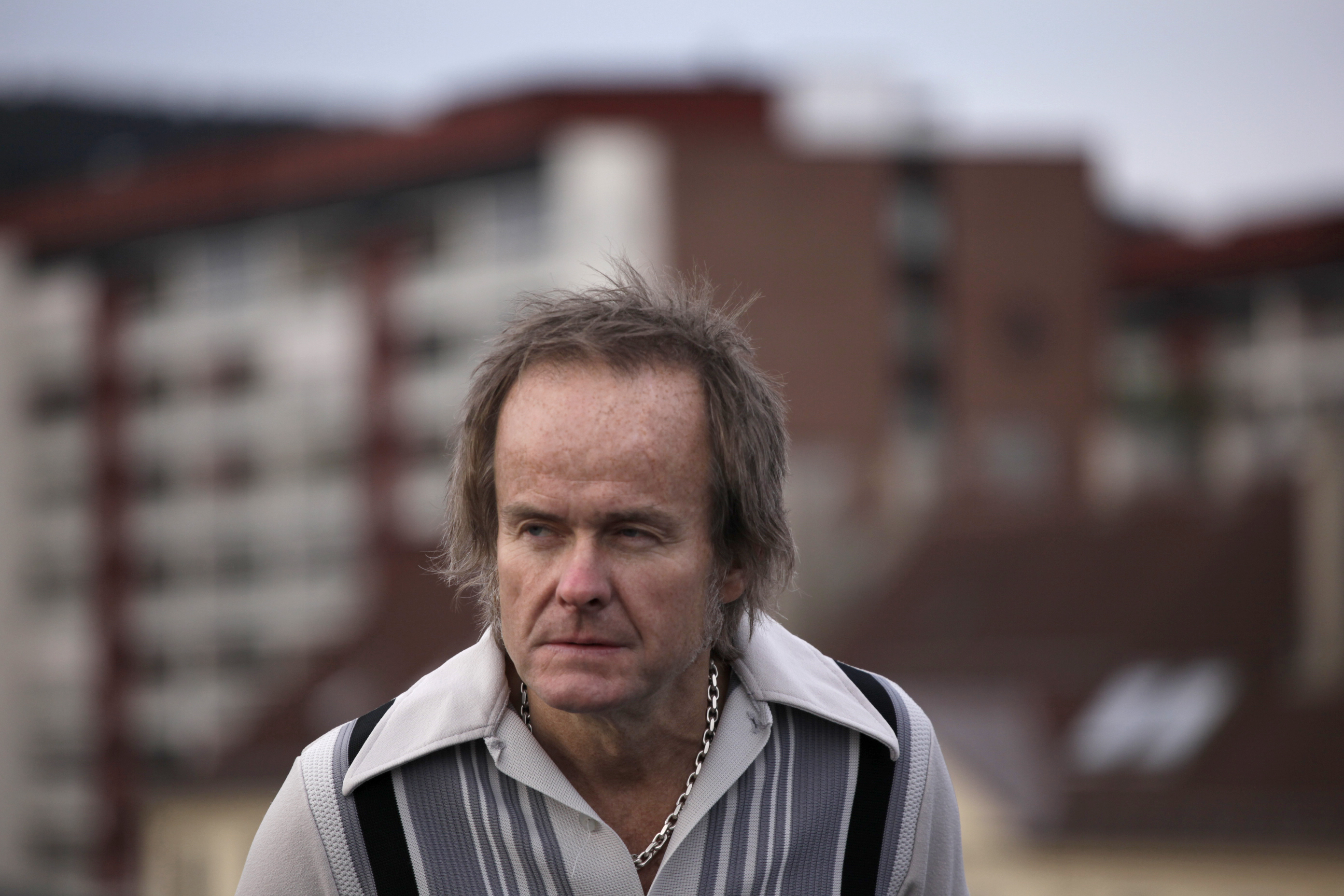
- Norwegian author and musician Sverre Knudsen photographed on Torshov, Oslo in 2009.
- Born: 22 November 1955 (age 70); Haugenstua (no) in Groruddalen in Oslo, Norway
- Other names: Freddi Fiord
- Occupations: author; musician; songwriter; music producer; playwright; translator
- Years active: 1979–present
- Known for: The Aller Værste!; Løver & Tigre (no); The Beste (no)
- Notable work: Materialtretthet
- Awards: Riksmål Society's Price for Children and Youth Literature (no); Spellemannprisen (x2); Språklig Samlings literature prize (no)
- Website: knusen.net

Sverre Knudsen (born 1955) is a Norwegian writer and musician. He has written for stage, television and digital media, and worked as a music producer.

== Career ==
=== Music ===
Between 1979 and 1988 Knudsen played in and produced the bands The Aller Værste! (TAV!), Løver & Tigre (no) (Lions and Tigers) and The Beste (no). He received a Spellemannpris in 1980 for the album Materialtretthet (Metal Fatigue) with TAV!

He has also worked as music producer under the pseudonym Freddi Fiord (thus baptized by Joe Strummer of The Clash) on recordings by Norwegian punk rock pioneers Wannskrækk and DumDum Boys.

His first solo album, La det brenne (Let It Burn), was released in 2008. For the lyrics of his second album, Vi (We) from 2017, he won his second Spellemannpris in 2017. Vi was the first album of a trilogy in cooperation with Lasse Marhaug, followed by Gud (God) in 2018 and Lit (Trust) in August 2019.

=== Writing ===
He made his debut as author with the novel Strålende nederlag (Brilliant Defeat) in 1989. His 25th book Aarons maskin from 2011 received Riksmål Society's Price for Children and Youth Literature (no), was nominated for the Norwegian Critics' Association Prize for Children's Literature (no) and the Brage Prize. He has written TV drama: The Third Sign (NRK 2002), one episode in Hvaler (NRK ), 12 episodes for Children's Television "Fritt Fram" and more than 160 episodes for the Norwegian television soap opera Hotel Cæsar.

Knudsen has translated over 50 fiction books, including books by Charles Bukowski, William S. Burroughs, Niall Griffiths, Nick Cave, Douglas Adams, David Walliams, Edgar Rice Burroughs and Rudyard Kipling.

=== Miscellaneous ===
He has also worked as a piccolo, caretaker, distribution manager, consultant for publishing and film, carpenter, stevedore, teacher, driver, tram driver in Oslo Sporveier, clerk, documentation writer in Norsk Data, copywriter in JBR advertising agency, for Filadelfia advertising agency, and as multimedia and internet developer in HEP, BeatMap and never.no AS. He started the digital communications agency never.no AS in the autumn of 1999, where he worked as a creative leader until the end of 2001. He became a full-time writer and playwright again from 2002.

== Recordings ==
=== The Aller Værste! ===
Album

- Materialtretthet (1980)
- Disniland i de tusen hjem (no) (1981)
- Materialtretthet (1st reissue) (1990)
- The Aller Værste! (no) Compilation (1999)
- Materialtretthet (2nd reissue) (2010)
- Live 1980 (no) (2007)

Singles

- Blålys/På vei hjem + SOS + En av dem (1980)
- TAV! EP (1980)
- Hakk/Bare feiginger (1981)
- Bare ikke nok (flexidisc) (1986)

=== The Beste ===
- En sang for åtte kroner (no) (1985)
- Blått (no) (1987)
- En sang for åtte kroner... & Blått (2012)

=== Løver and Tigre ===
- Grr... (no) (1983)
- Grr... & Live på Høvikodden (2010)

=== Solo ===
Album

- La det brenne (no) (2009)
- VI (2017)
- Gud (2018)

Singles

- Rask (1992)
- Kløen i blodet (2017)
- Oh Cordial (2018)
- Oh Cordial, Lasse Marhaug Remix (2018)
- Brunbeiser Boogie (2018)
- Overalt (2019)

== Theater ==
- Rytmeboksen – Norsk dramatikkfestival (no), Den Nationale Scene, (1990)
- Gåkunstens forfall – Bergen Internasjonale Teaterfestival, (BIT), (1993)
- Kål og karri – Drammens teater (no), (1998)

== Drama ==
- Fritt fram – Children's television, 13 episodes, NRK, (2000)
- Det tredje tegnet – TV series, 6 episoder, NRK, (2002)
- Hvaler (no) – (writer) TV series, TV 2, (2008)
- Hotel Cæsar – (writer) soap opera TV series, TV 2, approximately 163 episodes (2008–12 + 2015)

== Books ==
- Strålende Nederlag – novel, Aschehoug (1989)
- Rabaldriansen og Lille Fiskebank – children's literature, Aschehoug (1990) (with Christopher Nielsen)
- Sommerfuglbensin – poems, Aschehoug, (1991)
- Rask – young adult fiction, Aschehoug, (1992)
- Rabaldriansen og Lille Fiskebank står i butikk – children's literature, Aschehoug, (1993) (with Christopher Nielsen)
- Munn til munn – young adult fiction, Aschehoug, (1996)
- Berettiget – novel, Aschehoug, (1997)
- Noe i lufta – young adult fiction, Aschehoug (1997)
- Løpe løpsk – young adult fiction, Aschehoug (1998)
- Harmonilære – poems, Aschehoug (1998)
- Mannen som ble edru – novel, Aschehoug (1999)
- Kommer sjelden alene – young adult fiction, Aschehoug (1999)
- De aller nærmeste – crime fiction, Oktober (2000)
- Spill for stjernene – young adult fiction, Aschehoug (2001)
- Hjerte til salgs – young adult fiction, Aschehoug (2002)
- Død hånd – crime fiction, Kagge Forlag (no) (2002)
- Rytmisk Forening – young adult fiction, Aschehoug (2003)
- Fare, fare krigsmann – crime fiction, Kagge forlag (2004)
- Sukkersug – novel, Kagge forlag (2005)
- Fabrikken uten hjerte – young adult fiction, Cappelen Damm (2006)
- Racerbilen og tyven – children's literature, Cappelen Damm (2007)
- Skremt – barnebok, Cappelen Damm (2008)
- Elsker – young adult fiction, Aschehoug (2009)
- Hunden – children's literature, Cappelen Damm (2010)
- Aarons maskin – young adult fiction, Cappelen Damm (2011)
- Aarons hevn – young adult fiction, Gyldendal (2015)
- Sverre Knudsen, 1979 – autobiography, Aschehoug (2015)
- Frie og reptile. Norsk rasisme 2018 – pamphlet, Kvali-Kvanti (2018)

== Awards and nominations ==
- Spellemannprisen (no) for Materialtretthet with The Aller Værste!
- Sonja Hagemanns barne- og ungdomsbokpris (no) (1999) for Kommer sjelden alene (no)
- Språklig Samlings literature prize (no) (2005)
- Oslo bys kulturstipend (Cultural Stipend from the city of Oslo) (2008)
- Nominated to Spellemannprisen, Best Lyrics for La det brenne (2009)
- Nominated to Brageprisen for Aarons maskin (2011)
- Riksmål Society's Price for Children and Youth Literature (no) for Aarons maskin (2011)
- Nominated for Norwegian Critics' Association Prize for Children's Literature (no) for Aarons maskin (2011)
- Spellemannprisen (no), Best Lyrics for Vi (2017)

== See also ==
- The Aller Værste!
- Materialtretthet
