= 1915 in Norwegian music =

The following is a list of notable events and releases of the year 1915 in Norwegian music.

== Births ==
January

- 9 – Olga Marie Mikalsen, singer (died 2006).
- 23 – Aage Samuelsen, evangelist, singer, and composer (died 1987).

February

- 3 – Henki Kolstad, singer and actor (died 2008)

May

- 8 – Arvid Fladmoe, composer and conductor (died 1993).

September

- 3 – Knut Nystedt, orchestral and choral composer (died 2014).
- 23 – Finn Arnestad, contemporary composer and musician (died 1994).
- 25 October – Torleiv Bolstad, Norwegian fiddle player (died 1979)

November

- 2 – Sverre Bergh, composer, pianist, and orchestra conductor (died 1980).
- 14 – Jens Book Jenssen, singer, songwriter, revue artist, and theatre director (died 1998).

== See also ==
- 1915 in Norway
- Music of Norway
