= Lasse Myrvold =

- Born: Lasse Mustafa Myrvold; 10 July 1953; Stavanger, Norway
- Died: 3 September 2006 (aged 53) Bergen, Norway
- Genres: Punk rock, rock
- Instruments: Vocals, guitar, organ

Lasse Mustafa Myrvold (10 July 1953 – 3 September 2006) was a Norwegian musician and composer. He was raised in Stavanger, but is first and foremost known as a part of the Bergen Wave, with the pioneering Norwegian band The Aller Værste! and their Spellemannprisen winning album Materialtretthet (1980).

== Career ==
Myrvold played in bands like The Aller Værste!, The Beste and Kong Klang, but also contributed to such projects as Stilleben, The Willkoks Talk and Göbbels a-go-go as well as the film music to the Trond Kvist films Junkies and Velkommen hjem.

Unlike most of the members of the punk community, Myrvold was not self-taught, but had classical training. This was noticed by Kringkastingsorkesteret when The Aller Værste should perform at Spellemannsprisutdelingen in 1981: Myrvold wrote an orchestral arrangement of the song Bare ikke nok that was so complicated that many of the orchestra members lost track.

Myrvold held an impressive level of activity until the mid 80's, but while new wave music vanished and it was difficult to conduct projects, Myrvold got personal problems and were less productive. His only full-length album in the nineties with the group Kong Klang.

In 2005 he was diagnosed incurable prostate cancer. The tribute album Dans til musikken, with artists like Dum Dum Boys, Lars Lillo-Stenberg, Jan Eggum, Kate Augestad, Hopalong Knut, William Hut and Unge Frustrerte Menn was released the day after. He got to listen to the whole album before he died. Revenues from the album is dued to the education of Myrvold's daughter Natalie. Another tribute album, which consists entirely of underground bands, is also being published.

The illness did not prevent him from working on an upcoming album along with Kristian Stangebye with whom he also collaborated with on the projects Göbbels a-go-go, The Willkoks Talk, Kong Klang, as well as film music. This is according to Myrvold based on an octave of thirteen tones. The album was scheduled to be released in 2007 under the name Göbbels a-go-go 13.

Tore Renberg had an extensive interview with Myrvold 2006, and was host at the release party for the tribute album, where Natalie made a touching speech for her father. He died in Bergen 3 September 2006.

== Honors ==
- 1980: Spellemannprisen in the class New-rock, for the album Materialtretthet (1980)

== Discography ==
- 1980: Materialtretthet (Den Gode Hensikt/Jaap)
- 1980: Blålys / På vei hjem / En av dem (live) (EP) Den Gode Hensikt
- 1981: Disniland i de tusen hjem (Den Gode Hensikt)
- 1981: Hakk (Den Gode Hensikt), single
- 1986: Bare ikke nok (live) (Flexisingel)
- 1999: The Aller Værste! (Den Gode Hensikt/Virgin Records Norway), compilation
- 1999: Kong Klang(Den Gode Hensikt)
- 2007: Live 1980 (Musikkoperatørene/Kippers)
