= 1993 in Norwegian music =

The following is a list of notable events and releases of the year 1993 in Norwegian music.

== Events ==
=== April ===
- 10 – The 20th Vossajazz started in Vossavangen, Norway (April 10 – 12).

=== June ===
- 2 – The 21st Nattjazz started in Bergen, Norway (June 2 – 13).
- 26 – The 24th Kalvøyafestivalen started at Kalvøya near by Oslo (June 26 – 27).

=== July ===
- 13 – The 33rd Moldejazz started in Molde, Norway (July 13 – 18).

=== August ===
- 22 – The 6th Notodden Blues Festival started in Notodden (August 20 – 22).

== Albums released ==
=== Unknown date ===
A

Jan Garbarek

- If You Look Far Enough (ECM Records) with Ralph Towner and Nana Vasconcelos

== Deaths ==
August

- 10 – Øystein Aarseth, black metal guitarist and music producer (born 1968).

November

- 18 – Arvid Fladmoe, composer and orchestra conductor (born 1915).

December

- 27 – Cissi Cleve, composer (born 1911).

== Births ==
May

- 4 – Chris Holsten, singer and songwriter.

July

- 20 – Debrah Scarlett, singer and songwriter.

September

- 6 – Eline Thorp, songwriter and artist.

November

- 21 – Fredrik Halland, singer, songwriter, guitarist, and music producer.

Unknown date

- Arne Martin Nybo, jazz guitarist.
- Rohey Taalah, soul and jazz singer.

== See also ==
- 1993 in Norway
- Music of Norway
- Norway in the Eurovision Song Contest 1993
