= Christian Grøvlen =

Norwegian pianist and composer

- Born: Christian Hundsnes Grøvlen; 14 March 1990 (age 36); Bergen, Hordaland
- Origin: Norwegian
- Genres: Classical
- Occupations: Pianist, Composer
- Instrument: Piano
- Label: 2L
- Website: www.christiangrovlen.com

Christian Hundsnes Grøvlen (born 14 March 1990 in Bergen, Norway) is a Norwegian classical pianist, composer and director at KODE Composers Homes, educated at the Norwegian Academy of Music, Universität für Musik und darstellende Kunst in Wien and the Royal Danish Conservatory of Music.

== Biography ==
Grøvlen was born and raised in Bergen, where he picked up playing the piano with "Marianne Musikkskole" at 5 years of age. At the age of 13, he became a student at the newly started talent development program 'Young Musicians' at Griegakademiet, University of Bergen (2003–2009). When he was 15 he started studies under Professor Jiří Hlinka before he attended the Norwegian Academy of Music in Oslo, Norway, under guidance of Håvard Gimse and Lars Anders Tomter. Three times he has won first prize at the "Ungdommens Musikkmesterskap" (Youth Music Championship) in Oslo, as a soloist in 2005 and both as a soloist and chamber musician in 2007. He was a soloist with Bergen Filharmoniske Orkester first time at the age of 17 during 'The Youth Concert', where he also was awarded the audience prize. In May 2015, he debuted at the Universitetets Aula (University Hall) in Oslo and in June the same year at Festspillene i Bergen. He has participated in several festivals in Norway, including the Oslo Chamber Music Festival, the Winter Festival Games at Røros, and Sunnmøre Chamber Music Festival. In June 2016, he was awarded the Robert Levin Piano Prize in Oslo. Grøvlen is currently studying (Autumn 2017) in the soloist class at the Royal Danish Conservatory of Music under the guidance of Jens Elvekjær. In 2017, his debut solo album BACH - Inside Polyphony was released at the label 2L receiving brilliant reviews. Grøvlen is also a composer and his works are published by Norsk Musikforlag.

== Honors ==
- 2005: First prize as soloist at the "Ungdommens Musikkmesterskap" (Youth Music Championship)
- 2007: First prize as soloist at the "Ungdommens Musikkmesterskap" (Youth Music Championship)
- 2007: First prize for chamber music at the "Ungdommens Musikkmesterskap" (Youth Music Championship)
- 2007: The audience prize at 'The Youth Concert' with Bergen Filharmoniske Orkester
- 2016: Awarded the Robert Levins Pianistpris in Oslo

== Discography ==
=== Solo albums ===
- 2017: BACH - Inside Polyphony (2L)
