= 1968 in Norwegian music =

The following is a list of notable events and releases of the year 1968 in Norwegian music.

== Events ==
=== May ===
- The 16th Bergen International Festival started in Bergen, Norway.

=== June ===
- The 5th Kongsberg Jazz Festival started in Kongsberg, Norway.

=== July ===
- The 8th Moldejazz started in Molde, Norway.

== Albums released ==
=== Unknown date ===
K

Egil Kapstad Choir & Orchestra

- Syner (Norsk Jazzforum)

R

Terje Rypdal

- Bleak House (Polydor Records)

== Deaths ==
April

- 14 – Bjarne Amdahl, composer and orchestra conductor (born 1903).

September

- 17 – Jolly Kramer-Johansen, composer (born 1902).

October

- 29 – Marius Ulfrstad, composer and orchestra conductor (born 1890).

December

- 26 – Inger Bang Lund, pianist and composer (born 1876).

== Births ==
January

- 19 – Jørn Øien, jazz pianist and keyboardist.
- 21 – Frank Kvinge, jazz guitarist.

February

- 6 – Sigurd Slåttebrekk, classical pianist.

March

- 1 – Per Oddvar Johansen, jazz drummer and composer.
- 2 – Rune Brøndbo, jazz keyboardist, guitarist, and composer.
- 22
  - Arve Henriksen, trumpeter, vocalist, and composer.
  - Øystein Aarseth, black metal guitarist and music producer (died 1993).
- 30 – Jon Øivind Ness, contemporary composer.

April

- 6 – Bettina Smith, mezzo soprano.
- 7 – Stein Torleif Bjella, songwriter, singer and guitarist.
- 8 – Paal Flaata, vocalist, Midnight Choir.

July

- 10 – David Gald, jazz tubist.
- 16 – Finn Guttormsen, jazz upright bassist, Farmers Market.

August

- 7 – Geir Luedy Andersen, singer-songwriter and record producer.
- 20 – Frode Barth, jazz guitarist and composer.
- 21 – Jan Bang, musician and record producer.

September

- 23 – Bjørn Berge, blues singer and guitarist.

December

- 11 – Charlotte Thiis-Evensen, journalist and audio, film, visual artist.

== See also ==
- 1968 in Norway
- Music of Norway
- Norway in the Eurovision Song Contest 1968
