= Mads Eriksen (musician) =

Norwegian guitarist

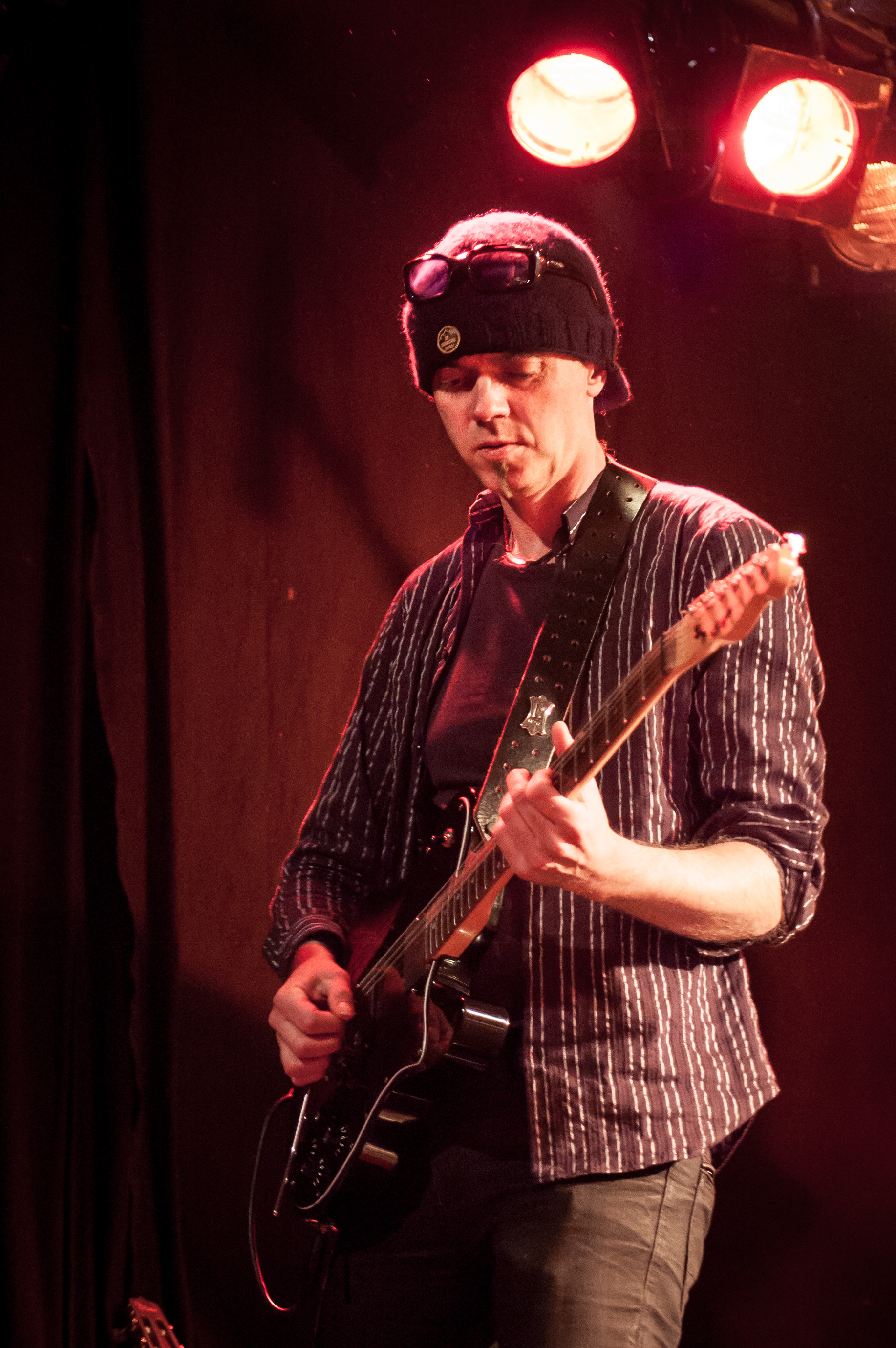
- Eriksen performing at Rootsfestivalen in Brønnøysund 2008

Background information
- Born: 12 October 1962 (age 63); Bergen, Norway
- Genres: Rock
- Occupations: Musician, composer
- Instrument: Guitar
- Website: madseriksen.com

Mads Eriksen (born 12 October 1962) is a Norwegian guitarist and composer, known as solo artist and for his collaboration with Chris Thompson among others.

== Biography ==
Eriksen was born in Bergen and picked up the guitar at twelve, and started the band "Lorraine" in 1976 together with schoolmates (including keyboardist Hans-Petter Isaksen & bassist Roar Nilson) from Nattland primary school. He got the role as "local guitar hero" inspired by Jimi Hendrix and Stones guitarist Keith Richards, playing at school dances. He continued appearing in various local bands, including "Sharks & Whales" (the continuation of "Lorraine" now including Hans-Petter Isaksen & bassist Ole Vaksdal) with the album Reaped by Man released in 1988.

After being labeled "A cross between Joe Satriani and Eddie Van Halen" by the Guitar Player Magazine in 1989, Eriksen has embarked on a solo recording career together with producer and bassist Frank Hovland. In 1989 he debuted as a solo artist with the album Journey, and has released a total of eight solo albums since then. Among other releases is the album Rediscovery which was released together with previous Manfred Mann's Earth Band guitarist and vocalist Chris Thompson.

In 1993 Eriksen was invited to contribute to the 150th anniversary of Edvard Grieg's birth. The result was a mini-CD called Intermission Troldhaugen (1993), where he interpreted six compositions by Grieg on electric guitar. This was also the year Eriksen participated in the band Jordal Express with Helge Jordal, Gisle Johnsen, Eirik "Pytten" Hundvin and Magne Lunde. The following year he was appointed musical ambassador of Norway in the U.S.

Eriksen has also performed with Bergen Philharmonic Orchestra among other symphony orchestras. In the spring of 2009 he toured with Ronni Le Tekrø (TNT) og Terje Rypdal under the name N3 (short for Norwegian Three).

Eriksen has been working full-time as a guitarist and guitar teacher since 1988. In addition to many private students, he has taught in the municipal musical schools in Bergen Municipality and Sund Municipality. From 1989 he held a permanent position as part-time teacher of electric guitar at Voss Folk High School until 2001. Since 1994 he has been frequently used as teacher at the Bergen College of Education, Åsane Folk High School, Voss high school and Kongshaug music college.

Mads Eriksen is the father of Major Parkinson guitarist Øystein Bech-Eriksen.

== Honors ==
- Guitar Player Magazine, January 1989, acclaimed as guitarist
- Guitar for the Practising Musician (Guitar Magazine), June 1992, selected Journey (1990) as Album of the Month
- Appointed musical ambassador of Norway in the U.S. in 1994 by Grete Knudsen, Norwegian Minister of Trade
- Guitar Techniques Magazine, January 2012, selected Just What the World Needs (2010) as Album of the Month

== Discography ==
=== Solo albums ===
- 1990: Journey (Storyteller Records)
- 1991: Storyteller – (Storyteller Records)
- 1993: Intermission Troldhaugen (Lightbringer)
- 1994: M.E. (Storyteller Records)
- 1997: The Plough Boy (Storyteller Records, )
- 1998: Suburban Cowboy (MTG Music)
- 2001: Redhanded (Grappa Music)
- 2010: Just What the World Needs (MTG Music)

Within Mad & Hungry, with Hungry John

- 2007: Travelin' (Hungry Records)
- 2010: Just What The World Needs (Hungry Records)

=== Collaborations ===
- 1988: Reaped By Man (Big Hand Records), with Sharks & Whales
- 1993: Jordal Express (Response), with Helge Jordal and Gisle Johnsen
- 2001: Verden Venter (Orchard), with Tintin & The Hairdryers
- 2004: Rediscovery (VME), with Chris Thompson
- 2008: Live (Voiceprint)
- 2008: Off the Records ..., with Sharks & Whales (limited edition)
- 2009: Timeline (Voiceprint)
- 2011: Acoustic (Gonzo Multimedia), with Chris Thompson live & unplugged performance recorded at the WDR2 radio station 2006 in Cologne, Germany
- 2012: Berlin Live & The Aschffenburg Remains Live at the Colos-Saal, with Chris Thompson
