= Tobias Vibe =

Norwegian footballer (born 1990)

Personal information
- Full name: Tobias Nygård Vibe
- Date of birth: 19 August 1990 (age 36)
- Place of birth: Lødingen, Norway
- Height: 1.95 m (6 ft 5 in)
- Position: Centre back

Team information
- Current team: Ulfstind

Senior career*
Years	Team	Apps	(Gls)
–2009	Sortland IL		
2010–2012	Senja		
2013	Hødd	13	(0)
2014–2018	Tromsdalen	107	(5)
2019	HIFK	8	(0)
2019	Alta	12	(1)
2020–2022	Tromsdalen	63	(2)
2023–	Ulfstind	37	(1)

Managerial career
- 2023–2024: Ulfstind (assistant)
- 2025–: Ulfstind
- * Club domestic league appearances and goals as of 5 April 2025

Tobias Nygård Vibe (born 19 August 1990) is a Norwegian footballer who plays for Ulfstind as a defender.

Vibe became playing assistant coach of IL Ulfstind in 2023 before taking over as player-manager for the 2025 season.
