= Program 81/82 =

- Origin: Bergen, Norway
- Genres: New wave
- Years active: 1981–1983
- Labels: Norsk Plateselskap
- Members: Christian Lund; Frank Hovland; Maia Urstad; Kåre Kalvenes; Arne Moe Vindedal; Marianne «Pjusken» Sletten; Kate Augestad; Nicolay Leganger

Program 81, later Program 82 was a new wave band from Bergen, Norway. After a self-titled mini LP and the LP Try to reach ... both of which came in 1981, the singer «Pjusken» replaced by Kate Augestad. At the end they changed their name to Program 82. At the same time they started to perform their music with English lyrics and released the album Pictures. At the next turn of the year, however, they chose to keep the name, and they returned to sing Norwegian texts. Slippe fri (1983) was the last album by Program 82.

Although the band released four albums on the Åge Aleksandersen label "Norsk Plateselskap", they never became any rock stars other than in Bergen. Hovland, Kalvenes and Augestad has contributed in a number of different bands and projects in Bergen. Hovlan also regular with guitarist Mads Eriksen, and touring with Terje Rypdal and Chris Thompson.

== Band members ==
- Christian Lund - drums
- Frank Hovland - bass guitar
- Maia Urstad - guitar
- Kåre Kalvenes - guitar
- Arne Moe Vindedal - percussion
- Marianne «Pjusken» Sletten - vocals
- Kate Augestad - vocals
- Nicolay Leganger - lyricist

== Discography ==
- 1981: Program 81 (mini-LP)
- 1981: Try to reach ... (Norwegian Label A / S)
- 1982: Pictures (Norwegian Label A / S)
- 1983: Unleash (Pro-Gram O'Phone3)
