= Solfrid Lerbrekk =

Norwegian politician (born 1990)

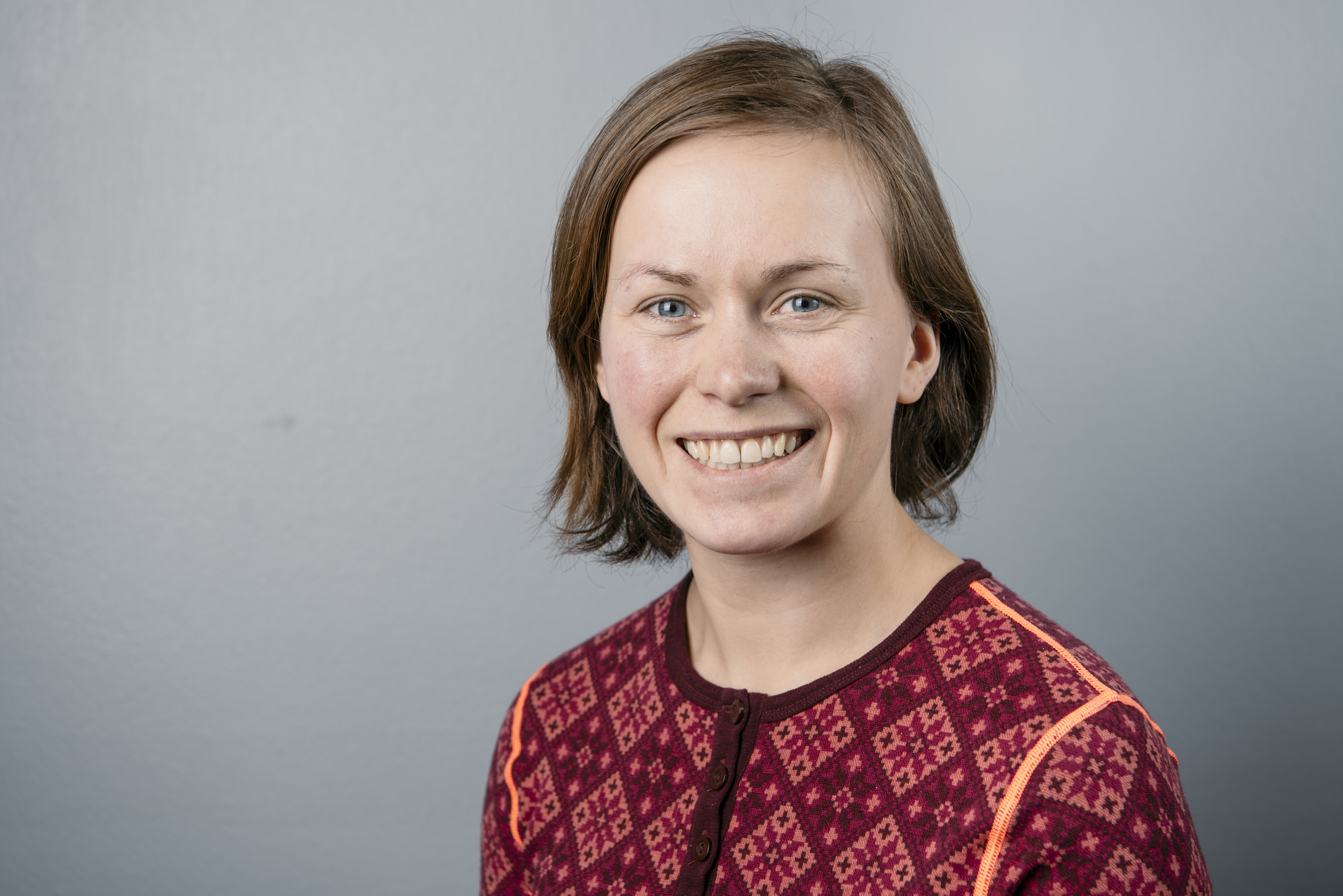
- Lerbrekk in 2017

Member of the Storting
- In office 1 October 2017 – 30 September 2021
- Constituency: Rogaland

Personal details
- Born: 29 November 1990 (age 35)
- Party: Socialist Left
- Occupation: Politician

Solfrid Lerbrekk (born 29 November 1990) is a Norwegian politician.

== Biography ==
Lerbrekk was born on 29 November 1990. She was elected representative to the Storting for the period 2017–2021 for the Socialist Left Party (SV) from the constituency of Rogaland.

In the Storting, she was a member of the Standing Committee on Labour and Social Affairs. She was a deputy member of the Storting delegation to the Nordic Council.
