= Villiam Strøm =

Norwegian ice hockey player (born 1990)

- Born: December 10, 1990 (age 35) Trondheim, Norway
- Height: 6 ft 3 in (191 cm)
- Weight: 213 lb (97 kg; 15 st 3 lb)
- Position: Defence
- Shoots: Left
- Eliteserien team Former teams: Storhamar Hockey; Vålerenga Ishockey; Stavanger Oilers; Lørenskog IK; Lillehammer IK; Rosenborg IHK; Kristianstads IK
- National team: Norway
- Playing career: 2007–present

Villiam Strøm (born December 10, 1990) is a Norwegian ice hockey player who is currently playing for Storhamar Hockey of the Eliteserien.

Strøm competed in the 2018 IIHF World Championship as a member of the Norway men's national ice hockey team.
