= Materialtretthet =

- Materialtretthet album cover art (2010 reissue)

Studio album by The Aller Værste!
- Released: 1980
- Recorded: Roxy lydstudio, Fredrikstad, September–October 1980
- Genre: New wave, ska
- Length: 48:46
- Label: Den Gode Hensikt; Sonet Distribusjon; Rec 90
- Producer: Freddi Flord (Sverre Knudsen (no)), Kim Augestad, and The Aller Værste! (original release); Sverre Knudsen (no) (reissued in 2010)

The Aller Værste! chronology
| ''Materialtretthet'' (1980) | Disniland i de tusen hjem (1981) |

Materialtretthet (recorded 1980 in Fredrikstad) is the debut album of the Norwegian new wave band The Aller Værste! from Bergen.

== Review ==
The record was released on the band's own label Den Gode Hensikt in October 1980, and was awarded a Spellemannpris in 1980 in the class new wave (a category only awarded twice). The record sold in a number of approximately 5,000. In 1990 it was re-released on the Sonet Label (LP, CD and cassette); the LP version also included an additional 7" record, with tunes from the band's single and EP releases. In 2004 a new Sound Enhanced edition of the album was released on the Label Rec 90. Materialtretthet was also released on vinyl and CD on the label Oh Yeah! in 2010, this time with a fold-out cover showing what happens to the diving woman on the front cover. The CD edition includes the first single, EP and Spellemannpris recording as bonus tracks.

The title of the album alludes to the Alexander L. Kielland accident, which occurred earlier the same year. Materialtretthet (material fatigue) was the proposed explanation for the accident. The cover is a reproduction of the diving woman from the salt lozenge packages produced by Norwegian candy company Brynild. On the album cover, the diving woman is anonymized (in an intentionally ineffectual manner) with a censorship bar over her eyes, and the text is replaced by the band name and album title. The album, as well as also Sonet's later release, included an extensive booklet.

The record stands in retrospect as one of the foremost expressions of new wave in Norway. Musically, the album takes inspiration from many sources, but especially prominent is the inspiration from British ska and new wave. Funk aspects are also present, which at the time was not often played in Norway. The central position of the Farfisa organ on the record also gives it a unique sound. Lyrically, the album was one of the first innovative and poetic rock and roll albums in the Norwegian language at a time when Norwegian artists often sang in English. It covered issues from partying and drunkenness ("Du sklei meg så nær innpå livet"), to dark visions of the future ("Hong Kong", "Blank"), to social and political commentary ("Dødelige drifter", "Oppvekst", "Materialtretthet"). In autumn 2011, newspaper Morgenbladet rated Materialtretthet number 6 among the 100 best Norwegian albums of all time.

== Track listing ==
1. "Du sklei meg så nær innpå livet" (3:15)
2. "Dødelige drifter" (2:36)
3. "Døgnflue" (2:01)
4. "Bare du som passer på" (3:25)
5. "For dem betyr det lite" (2:23)
6. "Bare en vanlig fyr" (2:02)
7. "Må ha deg" (3:36)
8. "Igjen" (1:39)
9. "Bare ikke nok" (3:17)
10. "Hong Kong" (3:19)
11. "De invalide" (3:09)
12. "Hekt" (3:36)
13. "Discodrøv" (3:21)
14. "Oppvekst" (2:47)
15. "Materialtretthet" (2:28)
16. "Menneskelig svikt" (2:41)
17. "Blank" (3:11)

=== Bonus tracks on the 2010 release ===
1. "Blålys" (4:08)
2. "På vei hjem" (2:42)
3. "Dans til musikken" (2:48)
4. "Rene hender" (2:41)
5. "Søster, søster" (3:31)
6. "Ingen vei tilbake" (2:04)
7. "Bare ikke nok" (live with Kringkastingsorkesteret conducted by Egil Monn Iversen, Spellemannprisen 1980)

== Personnel ==
=== The Aller Værste! ===
- Chris Erichsen (no) – guitar, vocals
- Ketil Kern (no) – drums, backing vocals
- Sverre Knudsen (no) – bass guitar, organ, vocals
- Lasse Myrvold – guitar, vocals
- Harald Øhrn (no) – bass guitar, electronic organ, vocals

=== Additional musicians ===
- Svein Johannesen (no) – trombone
- Øyvind Nord (no) – trumpet

=== Production ===
- Freddi Fiord (Sverre Knudsen (no)) – record producer
- The Aller Værste! – co-producer
- Kim Augestad – sound engineer
- Svein Rønning – sound engineer
