= Sandra Márjá West =

Saami politician from Norway

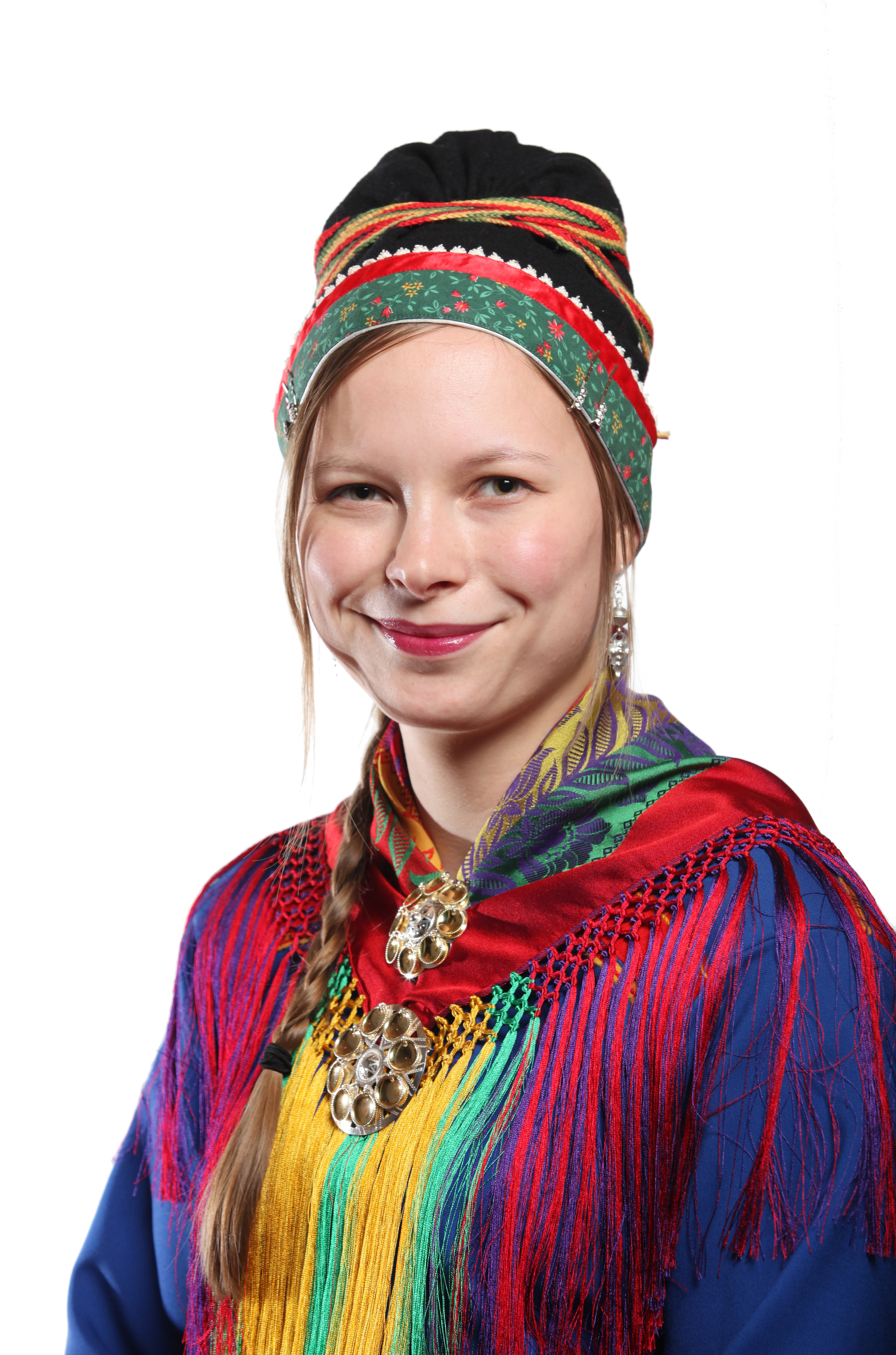
- West in 2013

Personal details
- Born: 11 October 1990 (age 35)
- Party: Norwegian Sámi Association
- Education: University of Tromsø

Sandra Márjá West (born 11 October 1990) is a Norwegian Sami politician and festival manager of Riddu Riđđu.

== Career ==
West has a bachelor's degree in Russian studies from the University of Tromsø. She has studied at the Samernas Education Center in Jokkmokk, Sweden. She was associated with Sámi University of Applied Sciences in the period from 2012 to 2013.

In 2013, she was elected as a Sami representative for the Norwegian Sámi Association in the Gáisi constituency, and re-elected in 2017. In that same year, she became a member of the Sami Parliamentary Council.

West served as project manager for Indigenous Youth Gathering (IYG) at Riddu Riđđu. From 2009, she was the Deputy member of Riddu Riđđu Searvi, and from 2013, she was the Deputy member of the Riddu Riđđu Festival. In 2018, she became the festival manager for the indigenous peoples' festival, Riddu Riđđu.
