= Eirik Ulltang =

Norwegian professional trials rider (born 1990)

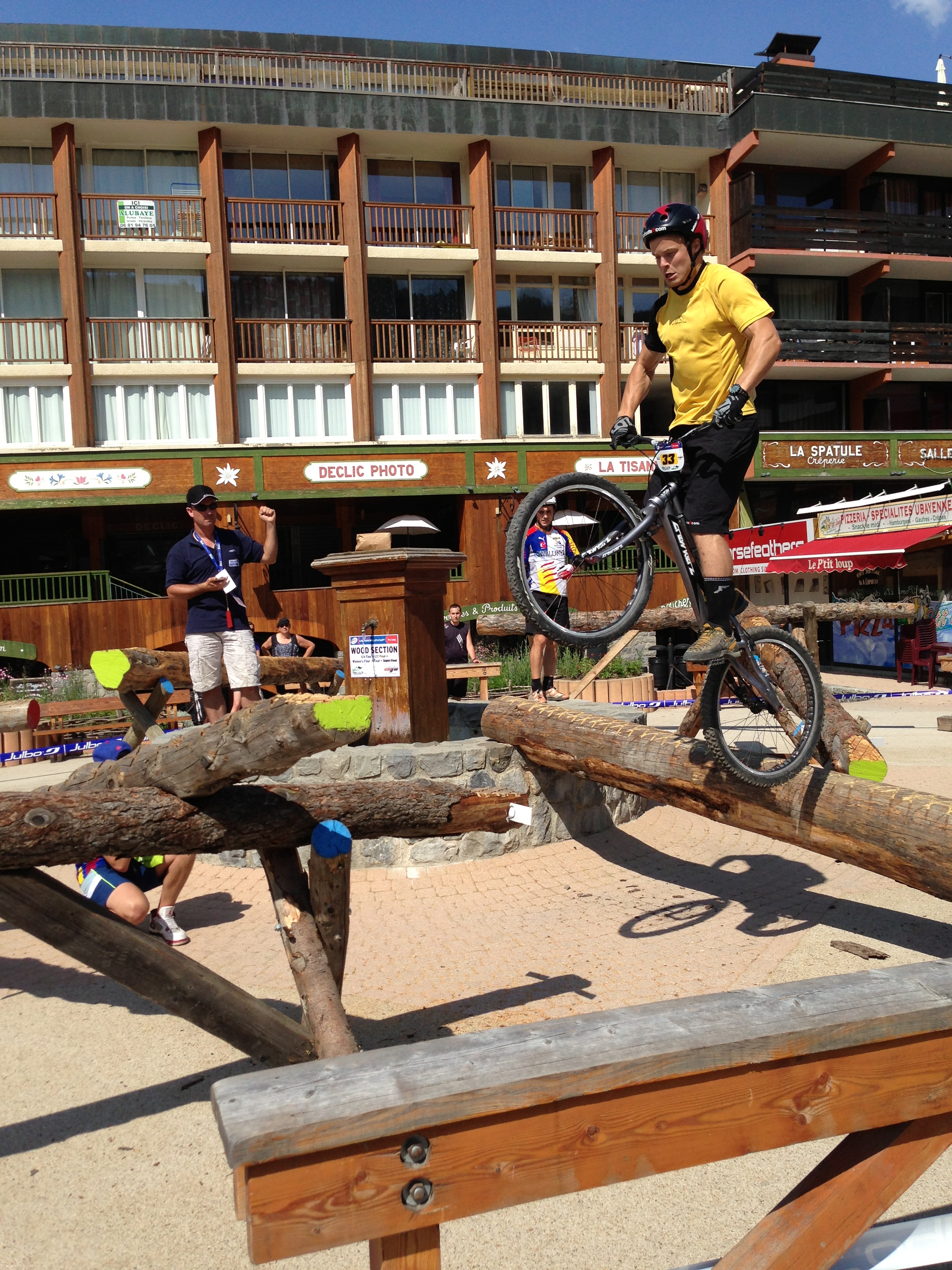
- Ulltang at the 2013 UCI Trials world cup

Personal information
- Full name: Eirik Ulltang
- Born: April 19, 1990 (age 36) Kristiansand, Norway
- Height: 1.80 m (5 ft 11 in)

Cycling career
- Sport: Cycling
- Current team: Norwegian National Trials Team
- Discipline: Mountain bike trials
- Role: Rider
- Rider type: Competition

Professional team

Major wins
- Norwegian cup overall winner (2012, 2013, 2014, 2015, 2016, 2017, 2018, 2019) Norwegian Trials Champion (2014, 2015, 2016, 2017, 2018, 2019)

Eirik Ulltang (born April 19, 1990) is a Norwegian professional trials rider. He was born in Kristiansand, Norway. He competes for Hardanger Sykkelklubb, and he is the first and so far only rider at the Norwegian National Trials Team. His best ranking was 11th in the world. He was the first Norwegian participating in a trials world cup. Ulltang was the first to ride up the entire trail that leads to the Pulpit Rock (Preikestolen), and also the first to jump the Svolvær Goat with a bike and Ridderspranget with a bike

== Achievements ==
This is a complete list of Ulltang's race results in Norwegian cup, world cup and championships.

=== Norwegian cup ===
Eirik Ulltang won the first ever Norwegian cup. He won the overall in 2012, 2013, 2014, 2015, 2016, 2017, 2018 and 2019.

No	Date	Location	Class	Position
1.	2012-06-28	Voss	Elite	1st place
2.	2012-6-29	Voss	Elite	1st place
3.	2012-7-14	Oslo	Elite	1st place
4.	2012-8-4	Bergen	Elite	1st place
5.	2012-8-5	Bergen	Elite	2nd place
6.	2013-3-16	Bergen	Elite	2nd place
7.	2013-5-11	Eikerapen	Elite	1st place
8.	2013-6-26	Voss	Elite	3rd place
9.	2013-8-3	Oslo	Elite	1st place
10.	2013-9-14	Lillehammer	Elite	1st place
11.	2014-5-24	Øystese	Elite	1st place
12.	2014-7-12	Bergen	Elite	1st place
13.	2014-7-13	Bergen	Elite	1st place
14.	2014-10-4	Kongsberg	Elite	1st place
15.	2014-10-5	Kongsberg	Elite	1st place
16.	2015-5-24	Norheimsund	Elite	2nd place
17.	2015-9-29	Kongsberg	Elite	1st place
18.	2015-9-30	Kongsberg	Elite	1st place
19.	2015-9-12	Bergen	Elite	1st place
20.	2015-9-13	Bergen	Elite	1st place
21.	2016-4-23	Kongsberg	Elite	1st place
22.	2016-4-24	Kongsberg	Elite	1st place
23.	2016-6-24	Norheimsund	Elite	1st place
24.	2016-9-10	Hobøl	Elite	1st place
25.	2016-9-11	Hobøl	Elite	1st place
26.	2017-4-29	Tomter	Elite	1st place
27.	2017-4-30	Tomter	Elite	1st place
28.	2017-6-24	Norheimsund	Elite	1st place
29.	2018-8-18	Tomter	Elite	1st place
30.	2018-8-19	Tomter	Elite	1st place
31.	2018-10-27	Bergen	Elite	1st place
32.	2018-10-28	Bergen	Elite	1st place
33.	2019-8-17	Tomter	Elite	1st place
34.	2019-8-18	Tomter	Elite	1st place
35.	2019-9-31	Norheimsund	Elite	1st place
36.	2019-9-1	Norheimsund	Elite	1st place

=== Norwegian Championship ===
Eirik is the first official Norwegian champion in trials.

No	Date	Location	Country	Class	Position
1.	2014-5-25	Øystese	Norway	Elite 26"	Gold
2.	2015-5-23	Norheimsund	Norway	Elite 26"	Gold
3.	2016-6-25	Norheimsund	Norway	Elite 26"	Gold
4.	2017-6-24	Norheimsund	Norway	Elite 26"	Gold
5.	2018-8-19	Tomter	Norway	Elite 26"	Gold
6.	2019-9-1	Norheimsund	Norway	Elite 26"	Gold

=== European Championship ===
No	Date	Location	Country	Class	Position
1.	2012-7-22	Weilrod-Riedelbach	Germany	Elite 26"	18th place
2.	2013-6-22	Bern	Switzerland	Elite 26"	17th place
3.	2014-6-14	Wałbrzych	Poland	Elite 26"	16th place
4.	2015-7-24	Chies d'Alpago	Italy	Elite 26"	9th place
5.	2016-7-23	Le Puy-en-Velay	France	Elite 26"	15th place
6.	2019-10-4	Montecreto-Il Ciocco	Italy	Elite 26"	23rd place

=== World championship ===
No	Date	Location	Country	Class	Position
1.	2014-9-4	Lillehammer	Norway	Elite 26"	19th place
2.	2015-9-5	La Massana	Andorra	Elite 26"	19th place
3.	2016-9-1	Val di Sole	Italy	Elite 26"	20th place
4.	2017-11-10	Chengdu	China	Elite 26"	14th place
5.	2018-11-5	Chengdu	China	Elite 26"	19th place

=== World cup ===
Eirik Ulltang was the first Norwegian that competed in the UCI Trials World Cup. His best result is a 12th place.

The table is an overview over single race results in the worldcup.

No	Date	Location	Country	Class	Position
1.	2012-6-3	Aalter	Belgium	Elite 26"	43rd place
2.	2012-9-23	Geneve	Switzerland	Elite 26"	37th place
3.	2013-4-21	Heubach	Germany	Elite 26"	33rd place
4.	2013-6-2	Wałbrzych	Poland	Elite 26"	24th place
5.	2013-6-28	Pra-Loup	France	Elite 26"	41st place
6.	2013-8-18	Méribel	France	Elite 26"	27th place
7.	2013-9-27	Antwerp	Belgium	Elite 26"	28th place
8.	2014-5-31	Kraków	Poland	Elite 26"	22nd place
9.	2014-7-25	Pra-Loup	France	Elite 26"	28th place
10.	2014-8-22	Meribel	France	Elite 26"	19th place
11.	2014-9-20	Moutier	Switzerland	Elite 26"	22nd place
12.	2014-9-27	Antwerp	Belgium	Elite 26"	24th place
13.	2015-8-9	Vöcklabruck	Austria	Elite 26"	19th place
14.	2015-8-23	Albertville	France	Elite 26"	19th place
15.	2015-9-27	Antwerp	Belgium	Elite 26"	30th place
16.	2016-5-21	Kraków	Poland	Elite 26"	27th place
17.	2016-7-10	Les Menuires	France	Elite 26"	14th place
18.	2016-7-31	Vöcklabruck	Austria	Elite 26"	12th place
19.	2016-8-21	Albertville	France	Elite 26"	17th place
20.	2016-9-24	Antwerp	Belgium	Elite 26"	22nd place
21.	2017-5-20	Aalter	Belgium	Elite 26"	32nd place
22.	2017-7-8	Vöcklabruck	Austria	Elite 26"	16th place
23.	2018-7-8	Vöcklabruck	Austria	Elite 26"	23rd place
24.	2018-8-26	Val di Sole	Italy	Elite 26"	17th place
25.	2018-9-22	Antwerp	Belgium	Elite 26"	28th place
26.	2018-10-13	Berlin	Germany	Elite 26"	18th place
27.	2019-7-5	Salzburg	Austria	Elite 26"	23rd place
28.	2019-8-23	Val di Sole	Italy	Elite 26"	20th place
29.	2019-10-11	Montecreto-Il Ciocco	Italy	Elite 26"	27th place
