= Linn Haug =

Norwegian snowboarder (born 1990)

Personal information
- Born: 6 March 1990 (age 35); Trondheim, Norway

Sport
- Country: Norway
- Sport: Snowboarding

Linn Haug (born 6 March 1990) is a Norwegian snowboarder from Trondheim, Norway. She has been riding a snowboard for most of her life, but she only started competing at the age of 15. She married on December 31, 2013.

== Awards ==
- Rookie of the year, Norwegian Snowboard Awards, 2006
- Nominated female rider of the year, Norwegian Snowboard Awards, 2007, 2008 and 2009

== Results ==
=== 2009 ===
- 4th Burton European Open Halfpipe
- 4th Chicken Jam Halfpipe, Mammoth
- 4th Snow Angels Halfpipe, Snowmass
- 4th New Zealand Open Halfpipe
- 7th World Cup Halfpipe, Vancouver
- 9th World Cup Halfpipe, Bardonecchia

=== 2008 ===
- 1st European Cup Halfpipe, Saas Fee
- 1st Swag Pipe Jam, Norway
- 3rd, World Championship, Juniors, Halfpipe
- 3rd World Cup Halfpipe, New Zealand
- 5th Burton European Open Halfpipe
- 6th World Cup Halfpipe, Bardonecchia
- 6th World Cup Finals, Valmalenco

=== 2007 ===
- 1st, Norwegian Championship, Halfpipe
- 3rd Paul Mitchell Quarterpipe, Lake Placid
- 6th World Cup Halfpipe, New Zealand
- 10th US Grand Prix Halfpipe, Tamarack
- Overall winner Burton Glory Daze Tour Slopestyle, Norway

=== 2006 ===
- 1st, Norwegian Championship, Slopestyle
- 1st Norwegian Cup Halfpipe
- Overall winner Burton Glory Daze Tour Slopestyle, Norway

=== 2005 ===
- 1st, Norwegian Championship, Halfpipe
- 1st, Norwegian Championship, Slopestyle

== 2010 Olympics ==
Haug represented Norway at the 2010 Winter Olympics in Vancouver for the halfpipe events.
