= Edwin Kjeldner =

Norwegian football midfielder (born 1990)

Personal information
- Date of birth: 1 March 1990 (age 36)
- Place of birth: Colombia
- Height: 1.78 m (5 ft 10 in)
- Position: Midfielder

Team information
- Current team: Øvrevoll Hosle

Youth career
- –2006: Ålgård
- 2006–2009: Lyn

Senior career*
Years	Team	Apps	(Gls)
2006	Ålgård 2		
2009–2010	Lyn	6	(0)
2010–2011	Ålgård		
2012	Lyn	18	(9)
2013–2014	Ålgård	49	(6)
2022–	Øvrevoll Hosle	2	(1)

International career
2006	Norway U16	9	(0)
2007	Norway U17	11	(1)
2009	Norway U19	2	(0)
- * Club domestic league appearances and goals as of 28 August 2022

Edwin Kjeldner (born 1 March 1990) is a Norwegian football midfielder who plays for Ålgård.

== Career ==
Edwin Kjeldner was born in Colombia and came to Rogaland, Norway in 1991 as an adoptee, along with his two siblings. He began playing football in Ålgård and was regarded as a notable talent, gaining appearances for the Norwegian national under-16 team. In April 2006, Kjeldner trained with Middlesbrough's youth team. He did play for Ålgård's reserve team, but had not yet played for the first team when he opted to transfer to Lyn in August 2006.

Kjeldner attended the sports academy Norsk Toppidrettsgymnas from 2006 to 2009, playing for Lyn's youth team and various national age-specific teams. In the summer of 2008, he signed a professional contract lasting until 2010. He made his senior debut in a friendly match against Liverpool on 5 August 2009, and his first and only league appearance of the season when coming on as a late substitute against Start on 23 August. Lyn, who had been enduring severe financial distress since 2008, were relegated to the 1. divisjon after finishing at the bottom of the standings. Over the course of the 2010 season, their financial situation continued to deteriorate, and at the end of June, the squad was asked to accept a large pay cut. Six players, including Kjeldner, refused this and were subsequently released from their contracts. Shortly after, he signed for his previous club, Ålgård. Ahead of the 2012 season he rejoined Lyn. After one season however he returned to Ålgård. Following a hiatus from 2014 and a stint in seven-a-side football, he started playing for Øvrevoll Hosle in 2022.
