= Marthe Wang =

Norwegian singer-songwriter

- Born: Marthe Haaland Wang; 25 October 1990 (age 35); Bergen, Hordaland
- Origin: Norway
- Genres: Folk, jazz
- Occupations: Musician, composer
- Instrument: Vocals
- Labels: Kirkelig Kulturverksted, Bjerke
- Website: www.marthewang.com

Marthe Haaland Wang (born 25 October 1990 in Bergen, Norway) is a Norwegian singer-songwriter born and raised in Bergen. She sings about hope, wonder and relationships and about the past, future and present in the Bergen dialect. Her music can be described as timeless, melodious, playful and serious. The genuine and organic soundscape covers both pop, folk and jazz.

== Biography ==
Wang released her debut album Ut Og Se Noe Annet in 2017. The album was well received in Norwegian media and nominated for the 2017 Spellemannprisen in the Folk category. The debut single «Til deg» from the album became Marthes big breakthrough. The song was used by The Church City Mission under the NRK Telethon 2018 and got high rotation on radio and Wang did many TV-performances. In November 2018 she received the award Tekstforfatterfondets lyspunktpris for young Norwegian songwriters with a prize amount of NOK 25,000, and also won the Edvard-prize in the lyrics category for Ut og se noe annet

On 17 April 2020 Marthe released her second album Bakkekontakt. The album received good feedback from music critics with dice roll 6 from Bergensavisen, dice roll 5 from VG, and excellent words from Dagens Næringsliv. The first single "No sier eg adjø" was A-listed and received a lot of air time on NRK P1. For the album, she was nominated for the Spellemannprisen 2020 in the Folk category.

On 26. May 2023 Marthe Wang released her first EP Live fra Kulturkirken Jakob. The EP contains live performances recorded in Kulturkirken Jakob (in English St. James Church of Culture) of 2 songs from her first album Ut og se noe annet and 4 songs from her second album Bakkekontakt.

Wang is educated at the Norwegian Academy of Music, where she studied jazz singing and music pedagogy. She completed her education there in 2014.

Wang is the cousin of double bassist Ellen Andrea Wang and sister of Norwegian artist Thea Wang.

== Discography ==
  - Ut og se noe annet (Kirkelig Kulturverksted, 2017)
  1. «Følg meg»
  2. «Ukjent venn»
  3. «Til deg»
  4. «Hon drar»
  5. «Din sang»
  6. «Ka kan eg gjøre med det?»
  7. «Størst av alt»
  8. «Bølgenes makter»
  9. «Stay»
  - De Utrolige – Ten Sing 50 År (Kirkelig Kulturverksted, 2018)
  Contributes on the song «Midt i mørket»
  - Bakkekontakt (Bjerke, 2020)
  1. «Hold meg»
  2. «Han stiller klokken tilbake»
  3. «Komet»
  4. «No sier eg adjø»
  5. «Det gjelder deg»
  6. «Du sa det til meg»
  7. «Ingen av oss visste»
  8. «Leiter etter svar»
  9. «Lillebror»
  10. «Vi skulle skrive en saga»
  - Gudene vet (Bjerke, 2020)
  Wang's interpretation of Gustav Lorentzen's Norwegian translation of God Only Knows by The Beach Boys.
- Live fra Kulturkirken Jakob (Bjerke, 2023)
1. «Hold meg - Live»
2. «Ingen av oss visste - Live»
3. «Din sang - Live»
4. «No sier eg adjø»
5. «Komet - Live»
6. «Bølgenes makter - Live»

== Awards ==
=== Spellemannprisen ===
Marthe Wang has received two nominations.

Year	Awardee	Category	Result
2017	Ut og se noe annet	Folk	Nominated
2020	Bakkekontakt	Folk	Nominated

=== Andre priser ===
- Edvard-prize 2018 in the lyrics category.
- Tekstforfatterfondets Lyspunktpris 2018 for lyrics on Ut og se noe annet.
