= Charlotte Dos Santos =

Brazilian-Norwegian jazz musician

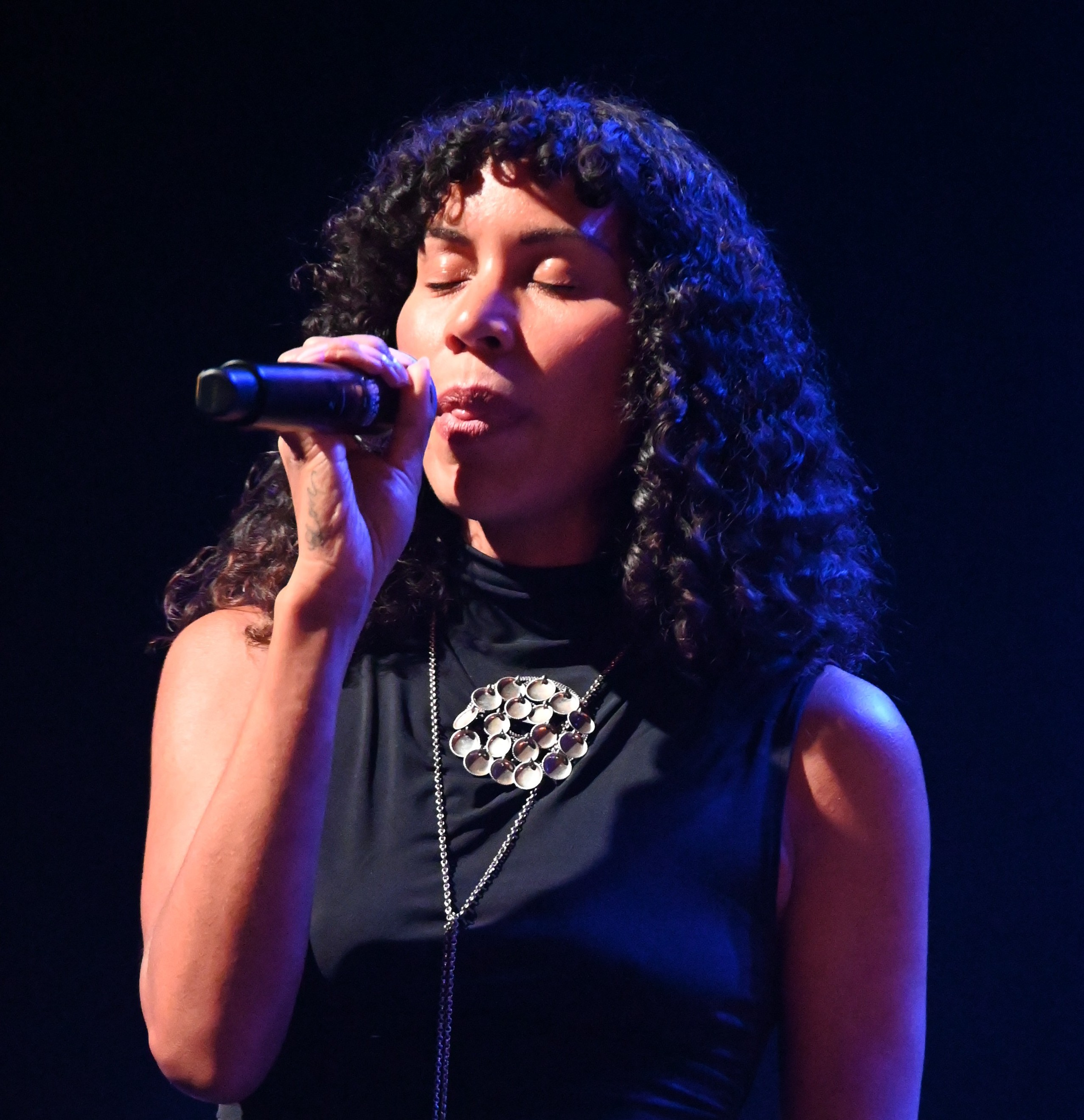
- Charlotte Dos Santos performing in 2026

Background information
- Born: Charlotte Hall Dos Santos; 1990 (age 35–36); Oslo
- Origin: Norway
- Genres: Jazz
- Occupations: Musician, composer, arranger
- Instrument: Vocals
- Labels: Fresh Selects, Because Music
- Website: soundcloud.com/charlottedossantos

Charlotte Hall Dos Santos (born 1990 in Oslo, Norway) is a Brazilian-Norwegian jazz singer, composer, and arranger, currently based in Berlin.

== Biography ==
Dos Santos grew up in Bærum with a Norwegian mother and Brazilian father. She attended jazz studies at the Berklee College of Music in Boston, Massachusetts (2013–16), where she earned a Bachelor of Music in Contemporary Writing and Production, and Vocal Jazz Performance. Her music mixes, “South-American traditions, jazz, neo soul, and tasty beats, with music history samples in a colorful way“. Dos Santos released her solo EP Cleo in 2017 on the label Fresh Selects. The EP was received positively in Norwegian media.

== Discography ==
- 2017: Cleo
- 2020: Harvest Time
- 2022: Morfo
- 2025: Neve Azul
