= Hanne Leland =

Norwegian musician (born 1990)

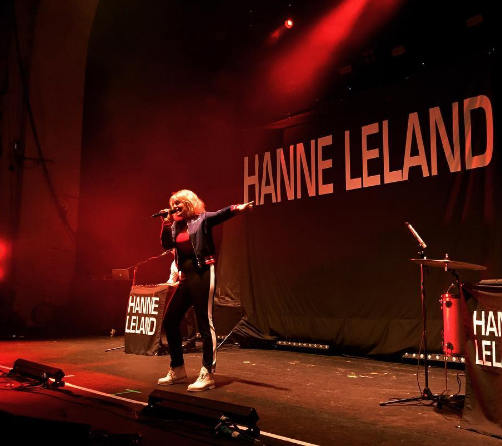
- Hanne Leland performing in London-Brixton

Background information
- Born: 9 May 1990 (age 36); Byremo, Audnedal, Norway
- Genres: Pop
- Occupations: Vocalist, songwriter
- Instruments: Vocals, piano, guitar
- Years active: 2012–present
- Label: Siwu Music
- Website: www.hanneleland.com

Hanne Leland (born 9 May 1990 in Byremo) is a Norwegian artist and songwriter in the electropop genre. She is known for her songs "Stay" and "It's Your Eyes I See". She has toured with All Saints, Gavin James and Greyson Chance

== Early life ==
Hanne Leland developed an early passion for music, beginning her musical journey at a young age in the small town of Byremo, Southern Norway. She started playing the piano at the age of 9, and by the time she was 10, she had already written her first song. At 14, she took up the guitar and soon began competing in various talent shows in her community. Leland, a self-taught musician with no formal music education, honed her skills independently, finding inspiration in her own experiences and creativity. At 16, her dedication paid off when she won a talent competition, earning enough money to record her first demo in a professional music studio. The demo, which featured three self-composed songs, marked the beginning of her journey in the music industry.

== Career ==
=== 2011–2013 Early releases ===
Hanne Leland was discovered by an American indie label in 2011, and she left Norway to start recording her debut album in April 2012. After recording the full album, she decided to drop the contract. She released her debut single "Free" independently in September 2012, but decided to trash the rest of the album she had recorded, due to her not being happy with the production of the album.

=== 2013: Nashville ===
After a failed attempt to record her debut album, she decided to try again. This time with a different producer, and a new team. She got in touch with the Nashville based producer Bruce Bouton (Reba McEntire, Shania Twain, Garth Brooks). She recorded the album "Honest" at Music Row in Nashville, along with members from Taylor Swifts and Dolly Partons band. Her album was done in August 2013, and she went back to Norway where she signed a contract with the Norwegian management Siwu Music and the German label Believe Digital.

=== 2013–2014: Honest ===
Hanne Leland released her debut single "Beautiful You" off of "Honest" in November 2013. She released her second single "Home Is Where The Heart Is" in February 2014, and the full album "Honest" was released 25 April 2014.

=== 2015: From Country to Pop ===
In 2015 Hanne Leland decided to switch genres and started writing electro-pop music. She released 4 pop singles including a remix of the song "Into U".

=== 2016: Keep On Movin, QUEEN, and UK tour with All Saints ===
Leland released the electro-pop single "Keep On Movin" in March 2016, and followed up with her new single "QUEEN" in September. She joined the British-Canadian girlband All Saints on their UK Red Flag Tour

=== 2017: Hungover You and You Don't Own Me ===
Leland released her synth pop ballad "Hungover You" 2 February 2017, and a remix of the song by the Norwegian producer and DJ CLMD was released in April the same year. On 9 June she released her power ballad "You Don't Own Me", a song that was praised as an independence anthem by American magazine Galore. The Cosmic Dawn remix was released 11 August 2017.

=== 2018 "Carry On" ===
Early 2018 saw the release of her single "Carry On" written and produced by Hanne, Chin Injeti and Brian West in Los Angeles. The track was premiered by Clash Magazine, the song was also featured by Buzzfeed. In 2018 she also released the synth pop ballad «Stay». The song was premiered by the renowned UK music website The Line Of Best Fit. The song was written by Hanne, and produced by UK producer Jim Eliot. and. «Stay» went viral on YouTube after the YouTube Channel Lit Network uploaded the song, the video has surpassed 4 million views. Later in 2018, Hanne released electro pop song «Fortress», a song she wrote with Jim Eliot She also released «Underdogs» that year, a song she worked on with London producer Hight. The song was premiered by Clash Music. In an interview with CelebMix Hanne revealed that she wrote the song based on her own experiences. In November 2018 Hanne released a cover of Joni Mitchell's «River».

=== 2019: «Tour with Gavin James in the UK» ===
In January 2019, Hanne Leland joined Irish artist Gavin James as his «special guest» on the «Only Ticket Home Tour» through England and Scotland. The tour visited London, Birmingham, Glasgow og Manchester.

Hanne Leland released several singles and remixes in 2019 Be With You (Demo), The Nights I Can't Sleep, Weak For You, Delicate, Ego Talking. She released her first EP «Acoustic EP» in August 2019.

=== 2020: «Two EP's» ===
In January 2020, Hanne released her EP «The Heartbreak EP»., Later in the year, Hanne released synth pop ballad «It's Your Eyes I See». She also released singles «Out of My Mind», «Golden», «Drama» In September 2020 Hanne released a 4-track EP «After Rain», consisting of 4 songs she created at home, during Coronavirus lockdown.

=== 2021: «Hanne Leland released several singles and EP » ===
Hanne released singles like "Even If It Breaks My Heart" and "You Have Taken Enough From Me" early in 2021, before she followed up with EP "Melancholic Mind" October same year. Music videos for "Even If It Breaks My Heart" and "Bully" are to be found on YouTube on Hanne's official VEVO channel

=== 2022: «Album release» ===
Singles like "If I Were To Lose You", "Good Days", and "After You" were released. The EP "Coffeehouse Covers" were released in July. Later in the summer it was announced that Hanne's new album "The Art of Growing Up" is expected in September 2022.

=== 2023: «Releases» ===
In spring 2023, the singles "Forever & More (The Wedding Song)" and "This Part of Town" were released, along with a cover of Prince's "Kiss". In autumn 2024, the songs "Porcelain Heart" and "Autumn Rain" were released.

=== 2024: «Releases» ===
Leland released the song "It's All Right" in May, which received a five-star review in Aftenposten. The song was also mentioned in Vårt Oslo. That same year, she also released the singles "Roots" and "Even The Brightest Stars Fade."

=== 2025: «Releases» ===
In March, Hanne announced that her new single "Everywhere I Go" will be released on 28 March.

On 29 August she released her single "Nothing At All".

== Influences ==
Hanne has said that she is inspired by Tove Lo because she "is real and raw, and not afraid of being herself" as well as Alanis Morissette, who Hanne says she has listened to "since she was a kid." Hanne also says that Carly Rae Jepsen is "a pop genius" and that Lorde "has such a way with words." She also praised Taylor Swift for her artistry.

== Personal life ==
Leland is a supporter of the LGBT community, which she says is inspired by her upbringing in South Norway where opinions on LGBT people were negative. She is also a feminist activist.

== Discography ==
=== Albums ===
- «Honest» (2014)

=== Singles ===
- «Beautiful You» (2013)
- «Home Is Where the Heart Is» (2014)
- «Hunter» (2014)
- «Divided Soul» (2015)
- «One Last Chance» (2015)
- «Into U» (2015)
- «Into U Cosmic Dawn Remix» (2017)
- «Keep On Movin» (2016)
- «QUEEN» (2016)
- «Hungover You» (2017)
- «Hungover You CLMD Remix» (2017)
- «You Don`t Own Me» (2017)
- «You Don`t Own Me Cosmic Dawn» (2017)
- «You Don`t Own Me Acoustic Version» (2017)
- «Hungover You Moxors Remix» (2018)
- «Carry On» (2018)
- «QUEEN Cosmic Dawn Remix» (2018)
- "Stay" (2018)
- "Stay (Acoustic)" (2018)
- "Fortress" (2018)
- "Underdogs" (2018)
- "River" (2018)
- "Underdogs (EDES Remix)" (2019)
- "Underdogs (Jamie Vee Remix)" (2019)
- "Ego Talking" (2019)
- "Ego Talking (Acoustic)" (2019)
- "Delicate" (2019)
- "Weak For You" (2019)
- "Weak For You (Kadrian Remix)" (2019)
- "Weak For You (Journoiz Remix)" (2019)
- "Weak For You (Vanessa Ellis Remix)" (2019)
- "Acoustic EP" (2019)
- "The Nights I Can't Sleep" (2019)
- "The Sound of Silence" (2019)
- "Blue Christmas" (2019)
- "Be With You (Demo)" (2019)
- "It's Your Eyes I See" (2020)
- "It's Your Eyes I See (3Mill Remix)" (2020)
- "It's Your Eyes I See (Acoustic)" (2020)
- "Out of My Mind" (2020)
- "Physical" (2020)
- "Drama" (2020)
- "Golden" (2020)
- "You're Not Here" (2020)
- "Water" (2020)
- "Scared" (2020)
- "After Rain" (2020)
- "White Christmas" (2020)
- "Forever and More" (2020)
- "Forever and More (Stripped Down)" (2020)
- "You Have Taken Enough from Me" (2021)
- "Even If It Breaks My Heart" (2021)
- "You Have Taken Enough from Me (Journoiz Remix)" (2021)
- "Gimme More" (2021)
- "Ayo" (2021)
- "Even If It Breaks My Heart (Siqu Remix)" (2021)
- "Transcendence (Demo)" (2021)
- "You Don't Know What It's Like" (2021)
- "Bully" (2021)
- "Bully (RUTH Remix)" (2021)
- "If I Never See Your Face Again" (2021)
- "Melancholic Mind" (2021)
- "When You Wish Upon a Star" (2021)
- "This Time of Year" (2021)
- "What Can I Do" (2022)
- "If I Were to Lose You" (2022)
- "If I Were to Lose You (Siqu Remix)" (2022)
- "Good Days" (2022)
- "If I Were to Lose You (Acoustic)" (2022)
- "After You" (2022)
- "Coffeehouse Covers" (2022)
- "Emotions" (2022)
- "The Art of Growing Up" (2022)
- "Have Yourself a Merry Little Christmas" (2022)
- "Forever & More (The Wedding Song)" (2023)
- "This Part of Town" (2023)
- "Kiss" (2023)
- "Porcelain Heart" (2023)
- "Autumn Rain" (2023)
- "Let It Snow" (2023)
- «It's All Right» (2024)
- «Roots» (2024)
- «Even The Brightest Stars Fade» (2024)
- «Winter Wonderland» (2024)
