= Frank Hovland =

- Born: 6 June 1960 (age 64); Bergen, Norway
- Origin: Norwegian
- Genres: Rock
- Occupation(s): Musician, record producer, luthier
- Instrument(s): Bass guitar, vocals
- Labels: Grappa Music, Storyteller
- Website: www.allmusic.com/artist/frank-hovland-mn0001069437/credits

Frank Hovland (born June 6, 1960) is a Norwegian luthier, rock musician and music producer from Bergen, known for his work with the band Program 81/82 along with his partner Kate Augestad, and collaborations with Ronni Le Tekrø, Terje Rypdal, Chris Thompson and Mads Eriksen.

== Career ==
Hovland started his career by playing with different rock bands, including Program 81/82, Avenue Talk, and Spastisk Ekstase in Bergen. Avenue Talk was the supporting act for A-ha on their Norwegian tour in 1987. Hovland has been a long-time bassist and producer for Mads Eriksen, and for the latter's collaboration with Chris Tompson. In 2007, he released the album Mad & Hungry with Magnar Bernes and Mads Eriksen. In 2009, Hovland toured as part of the backing band for Ronni Le Tekrø, Terje Rypdal and Mads Eriksen's N3, along with Gunnar Bjelland and Paolo Vinaccia.

== Discography ==
With Program 81/82

- 1981: Program 81 (mini-LP)
- 1981: Try to reach ... (Norwegian Label A / S)
- 1982: Pictures (Norwegian Label A / S)
- 1983: Unleash (Pro-Gram O'Phone3)

With Avenue Talk

- 1988: Cry for Mercy (Slagerfabrikken)

With Stain Monsters

- 1991: Stain Monsters (Stageway Records)

With Mads Eriksen

- 1990: Journey (Storyteller Records)
- 1991: Storyteller – (Storyteller Records)
- 1993: Intermission Troldhaugen (Lightbringer, 1993)
- 1994: M.E. (Storyteller Records)
- 1997: The Plough Boy (Storyteller Records)
- 1998: Suburban Cowboy (MTG Music)
- 2001: Redhanded (Grappa Records)
- 2010: Just What the World Needs (MTG Music)

With Chris Thompson

- 2004: Rediscovery (VME), with
- 2008: Live (Voiceprint)
- 2009: Timeline (Voiceprint)
- 2011: Acoustic (2011), with Chris Thompson live & unplugged performance recorded at the WDR2 radio station 2006 in Cologne, Germany
- 2011: Berlin Live & The Aschffenburg Remains Live at the Colos-Saal (Gonzo Multimedia)

Tribute to Lasse Myrvold

- 2006: Dans Til Musikken (Reel Noise Records), with various artists

With Mad & Hungry

- 2007: Travelin (Hungry records)
