= Per Bergersen =

Background information
- Birth name: Per Natrud Bergersen
- Born: October 1, 1960; Australia
- Origin: Røros, Norway
- Died: June 28, 1990 (aged 29)
- Occupation: Musician

Per Natrud Bergersen (1 October 1960 – 28 June 1990) was a musician from Røros Municipality, Norway. He was killed by a friend in 1990, when 29 years old, with a shotgun. According to news reports the friend said that he did this at Bergersen's request, as he wanted help committing suicide.

== Life ==
Bergersen was born in Australia. His parents later divorced, with his father, the metallurgist Olav Bergersen, remaining in Australia while his mother, Ingrid Natrud, returned to Røros with her son. She died when he was 13 and he lived with a friend of hers, Reidun Roland. At 16 he began training as a car mechanic and moved to Fastevollen, outside Rorøs. After he turned 18 he moved back to his childhood home and lived off his inheritance from his mother, which included several paintings by Christian Krohg. He taught himself the guitar and started writing songs while living at Fastevollen; in 1983–84 he studied music at Skjeberg Folk High School in Sarpsborg.

== Musical career ==
Prior to his untimely death Per Bergersen had published a demo tape, Redrum Psychosis, in 1985, and he also contributed a song, "Duejakt", to a flexi single released by the anarchist journal Gateavisa. After his death, the LP PB was released by Røros fritidsklubb (a local youth club). 1000 copies were released, which quickly sold out. This LP has gained cult status in various milieux, and is sold used for more than $100. In 2021 it was re-released on CD. PB is mainly based on Redrum Psychosis and live recordings from Thomasgaarden, Røros, in 1990, the night before he was killed. The lyrics of his song "Kyssing" was used as the theme song of the Norwegian movie, Store gutter gråter ikke. There the song had the title "Skyter meg på julaften" which directly translated means "I'll shoot myself on Christmas Eve", which is the opening line of the song. Bergersen's version was not included on PB.

Per Bergersen wrote most of his songs in Norwegian, although he also had three in English, and much of his material was very dark and sad, probably because of his own depressions and problems, having grown up with his mother until she died when he was 13. Some, however, also had a humorous and grotesque edge, whereas still others were social commentaries. Per Bergersen is considered among many people as the greatest (undiscovered) Norwegian songwriter to ever have lived, and in November 2010 the Norwegian Broadcasting Corporation broadcast a half-hour-long documentary on Bergersen titled Ridder Sjanseløs. Most of his material would also classify as pretty strong comments towards society and social structures like the song "Sachsenhausen" which have a line that directly translated means something like, "They will fire up the ovens for you or me, they don't really care who they burn". Which must be seen in relation to how Per Bergersen probably felt as an outsider in society and being neither able nor welcome to participate on his own terms.

He has been named as an early influence by Mayhem.

== Discography ==
- PB
- Redrum Psychosis
- Live Røros Fritidsklubb, 1990
- Live Thomasgaarden, Røros
