= The Aller Værste! =

Norwegian musical group

- Origin: Bergen, Norway
- Genres: New wave, post-punk, 2-tone
- Years active: 1979–1981
- Labels: Den Gode Hensikt
- Members: Sverre Knudsen; Ketil Kern; Harald Øhrn; Lasse Myrvold; Chris Erichsen

The Aller Værste! (1979–1981) was a Norwegian rock band from Bergen, that was awarded Spellemannprisen for the album Materialtretthet (1980).

== Biography ==
The Aller Værste! was influenced and inspired by punk, new wave, ska and reggae and released two albums and three 7" singles/EPs. Several of their releases are considered classics in Norwegian rock. They received a Spellemannprisen in 1980, for the album Materialtretthet. Their two first singles were played at the BBC, by program manager John Peel.

The manager of the band was Lars Lauritzsen. They had a reunion tour in 1990 and concerts in Bergen and Oslo in 1999. Kern, Øhrn, Myrvold and Erichsen were in the rock band Johnny Banan Band before TAV!. After Ketil Kern left in 1981, Robert Isdal from the punk band Fader War played drums on the last single Hakk.

Members of The Aller Værste! joined and became active in bands like The Beste, Ratataboo!, Løver og Tigre (together with Hot Club de Norvege), etc. The Aller Værste! is considered a Bergen band, even though none of the band members are from Bergen. Myrvold grew up in Stavanger, while the other four are from Oslo.

A series of the most known songs by The Aller Værste! have been interpreted by various artists on the disc Dans til musikken, which is a tribute album to Lasse Myrvold.

== Honors ==
- Spellemannprisen (1980, in the class New-rock, for the album Materialtretthet)

== Band members ==
- Sverre Knudsen - bass, organ, vocals
- Ketil Kern - drums
- Harald Øhrn - bass, organ, vocals
- Lasse Myrvold - guitar, organ, vocals
- Chris Erichsen - guitar, organ, vocals

== Discography ==
Albums

- 1980: Materialtretthet (Den Gode Hensikt/Jaap)
- 1981: Disniland i de tusen hjem (Den Gode Hensikt)
- 1999: The Aller Værste! (Den Gode Hensikt/Virgin Records Norway), compilation
- 2007: Live 1980 (Musikkoperatørene/Kippers)

Singles and EP's

- 1980: "Blålys/På vei hjem" (Den Gode Hensikt) (single)
- 1980: The Aller Værste! (Den Gode Hensikt) (EP)
- 1980: Blålys/På vei hjem/En av dem (live) (Den Gode Hensikt) (EP)
- 1981: "Hakk" (Den Gode Hensikt) (single)

== Biography ==
- Knausgård, Yngve (2011). The Aller Værste!: Materialtretthet. Oslo: Falck forlag. ISBN 978-82-93039-23-5.
