= 2013 in Norwegian music =

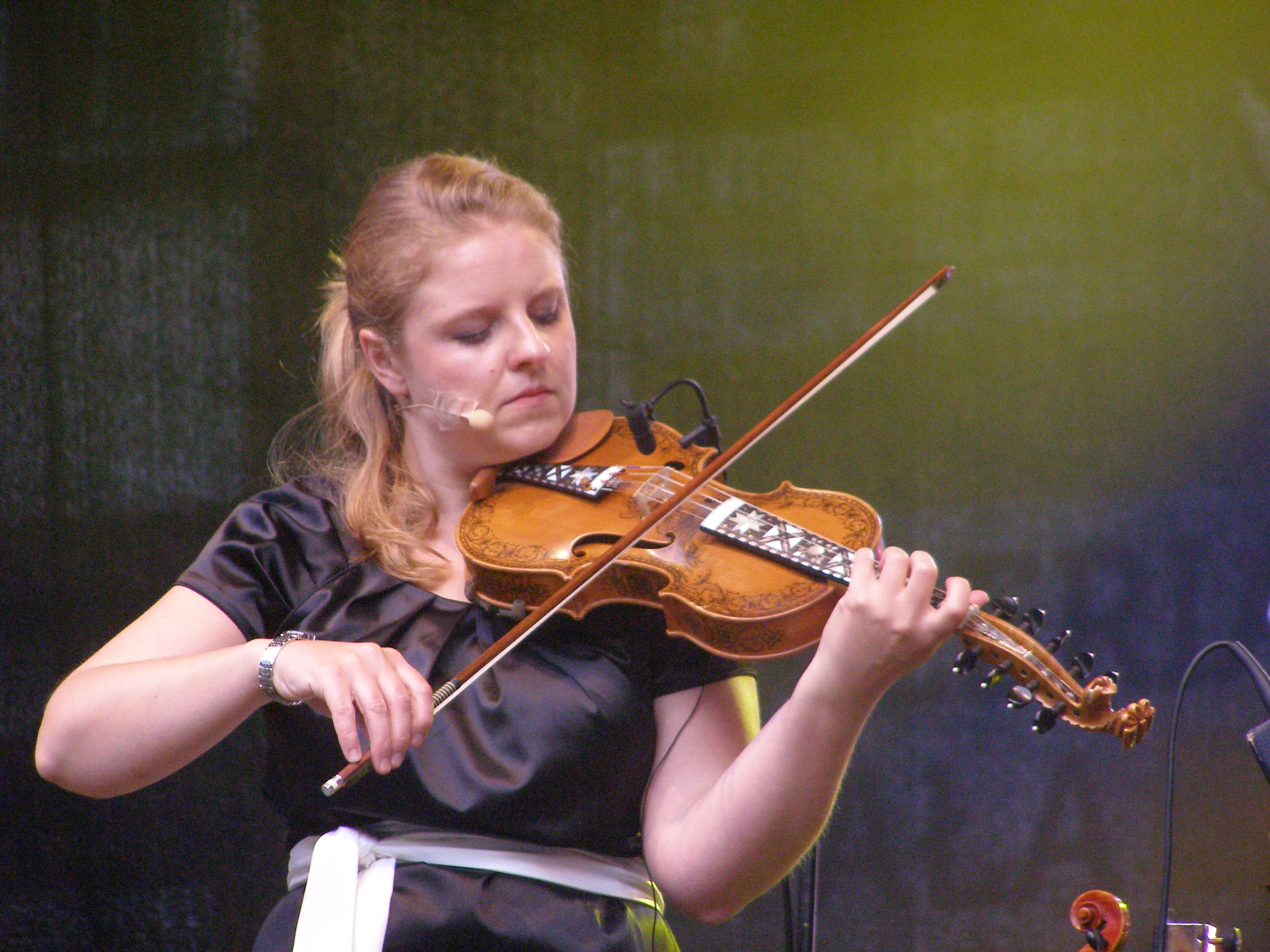
Jorun Marie Kvernberg at the Gdansk Tindra Kroke concert.

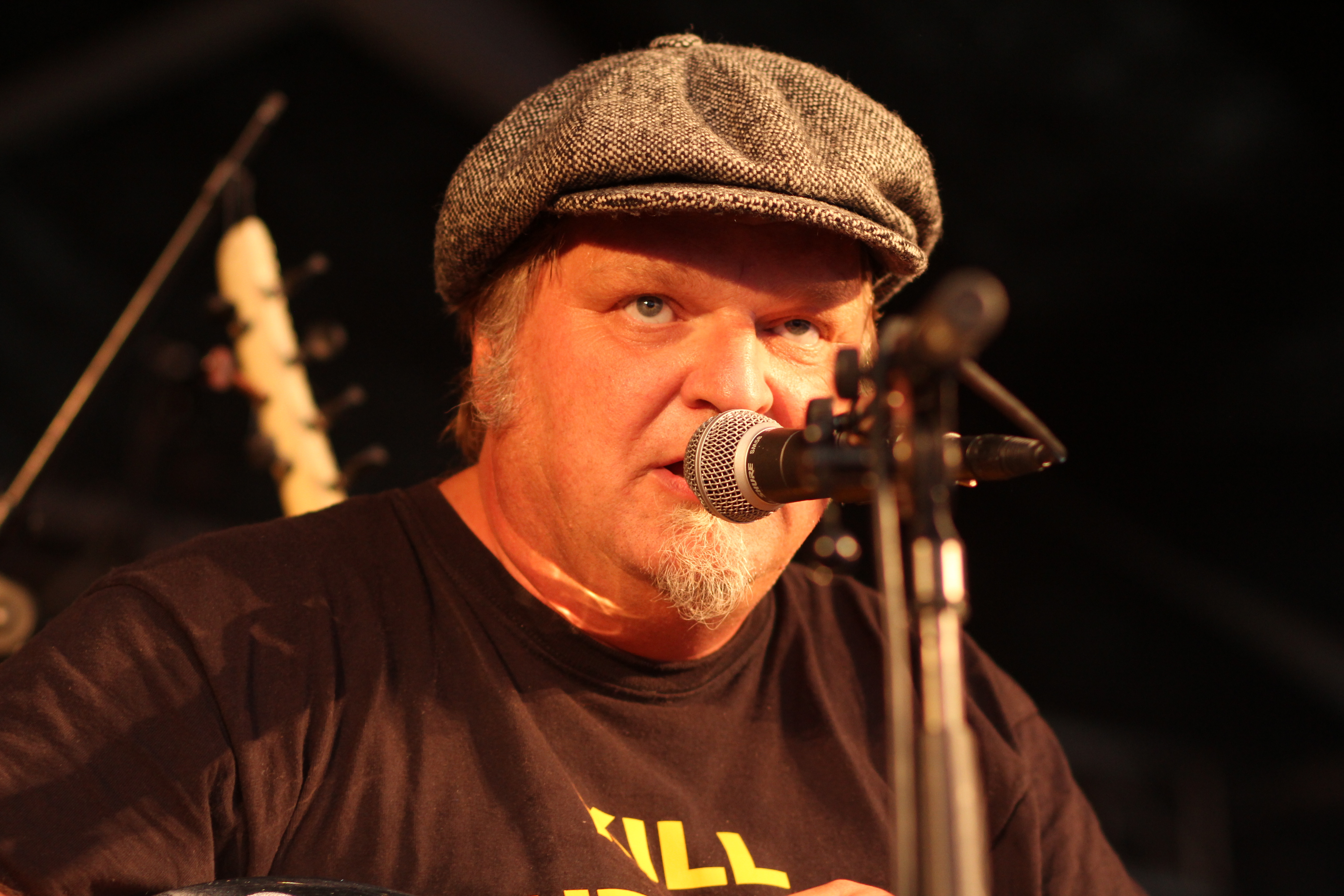
Knut Reiersrud at Notodden Blues Festival.

The following is a list of notable events and releases of the year 2013 in Norwegian music.

== Events ==
=== January ===
- 23 Bodø Jazz Open started in Bodø (January 23–27).
- 25
  - Nordlysfestivalen started in Tromsø (January 25 – February 2).
  - Nils Anders Mortensen (piano) was awarded the Nordlysprisen 2013 at Nordlysfestivalen.
- 31
  - The Polarjazz Festival 2013 started in Longyearbyen (January 31 – February 7).
  - 31 – Kristiansund Opera Festival opened (January 31 – February 16).

=== March ===
- 8 – Narvik Winter Festival started (March 8–17).
- 22 – Vossajazz started in Voss Municipality (March 22–24).
- 23
  - Tore Brunborg was awarded Vossajazzprisen 2013 as well as the Buddyprisen 2012 at Vossajazz.
  - Stian Carstensen performed the commissioned work Flipp for Vossajazz 2013.
- 27 – Inferno Metal Festival 2014 started in Oslo (March 27–30).

=== April ===
- 24 – SoddJazz 2013 started in Inderøy Municipality, Nord-Trøndelag (April 24–28).

=== May ===
- 22 Festspillene i Bergen starts (May 22 – June 5)
- 22 Nattjazz starts in Bergen (May 23 – June 1)

=== June ===
- 12 – Bergenfest 2013 started in Bergen (June 12–15).
- 13 – Norwegian Wood 2013 started in Oslo (June 13–16).

=== July ===
- 3 – Kongsberg Jazzfestival started (July 3 – 6).
- 7 – Lofoten Piano Festival started in Lofoten (July 7–12).
- 15 Moldejazz starts in Molde with Jason Moran as artist in residence (July 15–20).

=== August ===
- 1 – The 26th Notodden Blues Festival started in Notodden (August 1 – 4).
- 12 – Oslo Jazzfestival started in Oslo (August 12–17).
- 13 – Erlend Skomsvoll was recipient of the Ella-prisen 2013 at the Oslo Jazzfestival.

=== September ===
- 5 – Ultima Oslo Contemporary Music Festival 2014 starts in Oslo (September 5–14).
- 6 – Punktfestivalen started in Kristiansand (September 6–8).

=== October ===
- 24 – The 12th Insomnia Festival started in Tromsø (October 24–26).
- 25 – The 10th Ekkofestival started in Bergen (October 25 – November 3).
- 29 – The Oslo World Music Festival started in Oslo (October 29 – November 3).

=== November ===
- 13 – The Vardø Blues Festival (Blues i Vintermørket) started (November 13 – 17).
- 21 – The 8th Barents Jazz, Tromsø International Jazz Festival started (November 21 – 24).

=== December ===
- 11 – The Nobel Peace Prize Concert was held at Telenor Arena.

== Albums released ==
=== March ===
| Day | Album | Artist | Label | Notes | Ref. |
|---|---|---|---|---|---|
| 1 | Verden Er Enkel | Honningbarna | Virgin | | |

=== April ===
| Day | Album | Artist | Label | Notes | Ref. |
|---|---|---|---|---|---|
| 4 | There's A Hole In The Mountain | Atomic | Losen Records | | |
| 12 | La Notte | Ketil Bjørnstad | ECM Records | Produced by Manfred Eicher | |
| 12 | Still Life with Eggplant | Motorpsycho and Reine Fiske | Rune Grammofon | Produced by Bent Sæther | |
| 12 | Map Of The World – Music For Guitar | Gjermund Titlestad | Ponca Jazz Records | | |

=== June ===
| Day | Album | Artist | Label | Notes | Ref. |
|---|---|---|---|---|---|
| 14 | Melodic Warrior | Terje Rypdal with The Hilliard Ensemble | ECM | Produced by Manfred Eicher | |
| 25 | OWL Trio | Lage Lund, Orlando le Fleming, Will Vinson | Losen | | |

=== September ===
| Day | Album | Artist | Label | Notes | Ref. |
|---|---|---|---|---|---|
| 6 | Ville Ord | Frida Ånnevik | Grappa | Recipient of the Spellemannprisen lyricist award | |
| 9 | Duolia | Duplex | NorCD | | |
| 9 | Sketches of ... | Duplex | NorCD | | |
| 11 | Logic | Mopti | Ocean Sound Recordings | | |
| 20 | Russian Dream | Andrea Kvintett | NorCD | | |
| 20 | The Forester | Susanna and Ensemble neoN | SusannaSonata | Produced by Deathprod and Susanna | |

=== October ===
| Day | Album | Artist | Label | Notes | Ref. |
|---|---|---|---|---|---|
| 1 | Places of Worship | Arve Henriksen | Rune Grammofon | | |
| 8 | We Are All Small Pixels | Pixel | Cuneiform Records | | |
| 18 | NyeSongar.no | Karl Seglem | NorCD | | |
| 25 | New Circle | Geir Lysne | ACT Music | | |

=== November ===
| Day | Album | Artist | Label | Notes | Ref. |
|---|---|---|---|---|---|
| 29 | Dagane | Daniel Herskedal | NorCD | | |

=== Unknown date ===
#

F

== New Artists ==
- Monica Heldal received the Spellemannprisen award, as 'Best newcomer of the year 2013', for the album Boy From The North and was with that also recipient of the Gramo grant.

== Deaths ==
January

- 14 – Morten Mølster, rock guitarist, The September When (born 1962).
- 25 – Aase Nordmo Løvberg, opera singer (born 1923).

February

- 1 – Dag Schjelderup-Ebbe, musicologist, contemporary classical composer, music critic and biographer (born 1926).
- 5 – Egil Hovland, contemporary classical composer (born 1924).
- 8 – Knut Nesbø, rock and folk guitarist, Di Derre (born 1961).

March

- 18 – Eivind Rølles, guitarist and pop singer, The Monroes, cancer (born 1959).

April

- 17 – Yngve Moe, jazz and rock bass guitarist, Dance with a Stranger, fell in coma, after drowning in Tenerife, Spain (born 1957).

May

- 19 – Anders Vangen, operatic singer (born 1960).

July

- 1 – Rolf Graf, jazz-rock bass guitarist, Lava, cancer (born 1960).
- 29 – Ole Henrik Moe, classical pianist, art historian and critic (born 1920).

August

- 18 – Rolv Wesenlund, comedian, singer, jazz clarinetist and saxophonist, writer, and actor (born 1936).
- 29 – Kjell Lund, architect, songwriter and singer (born 1927).

September

- 17 – Alex Naumik, Lithuanian-born artist, songwriter and record producer (born 1949).
- 24 – Sverre Bruland, classical conductor and trumpeter (born 1923).
- 26 – Arnstein Johansen, accordionist (born 1925).

October

- 2 – Kaare Ørnung, classical pianist, entertainer and music teacher (born 1931).
- 19 – Lage Fosheim, pop singer, The Monroes, cancer (born 1958).

== See also ==
- 2013 in Norway
- Music of Norway
- Norway in the Eurovision Song Contest 2013
