= 2009 in Norwegian music =

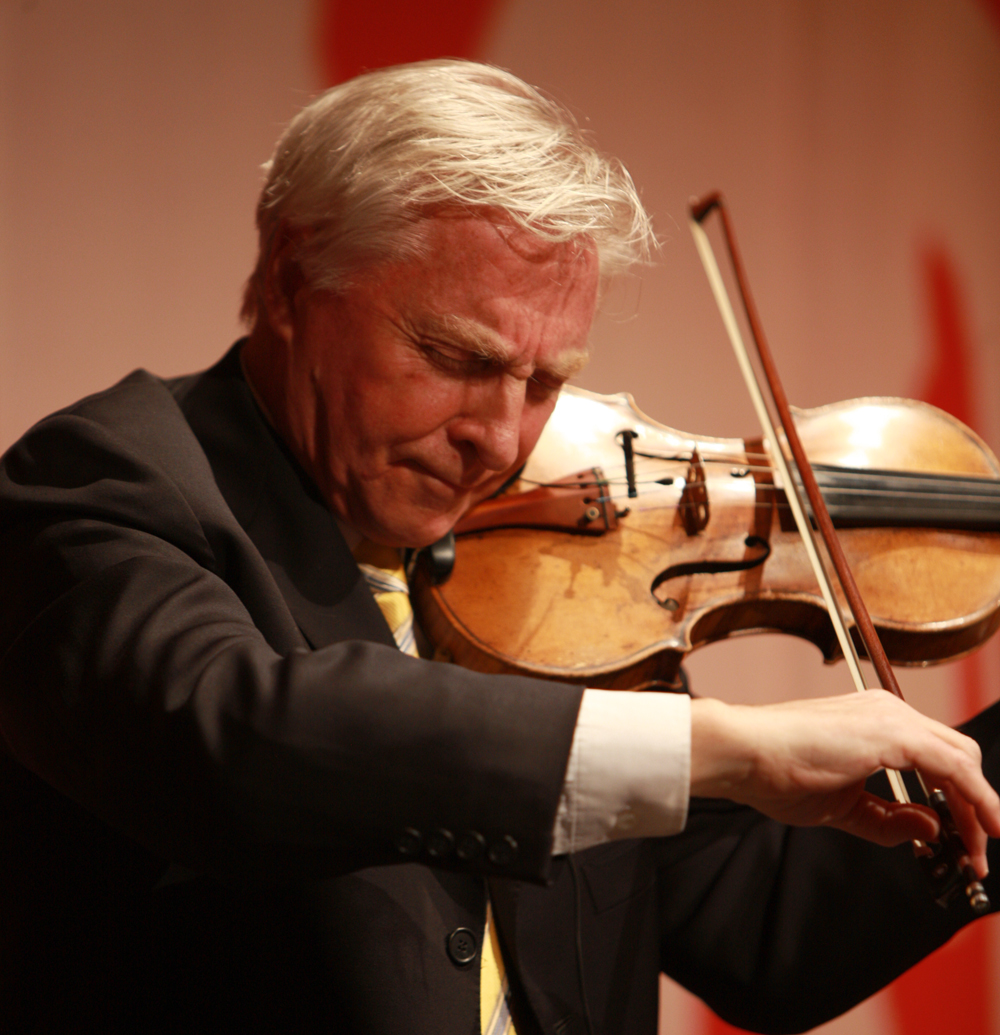
Arve Tellefsen in 2009.

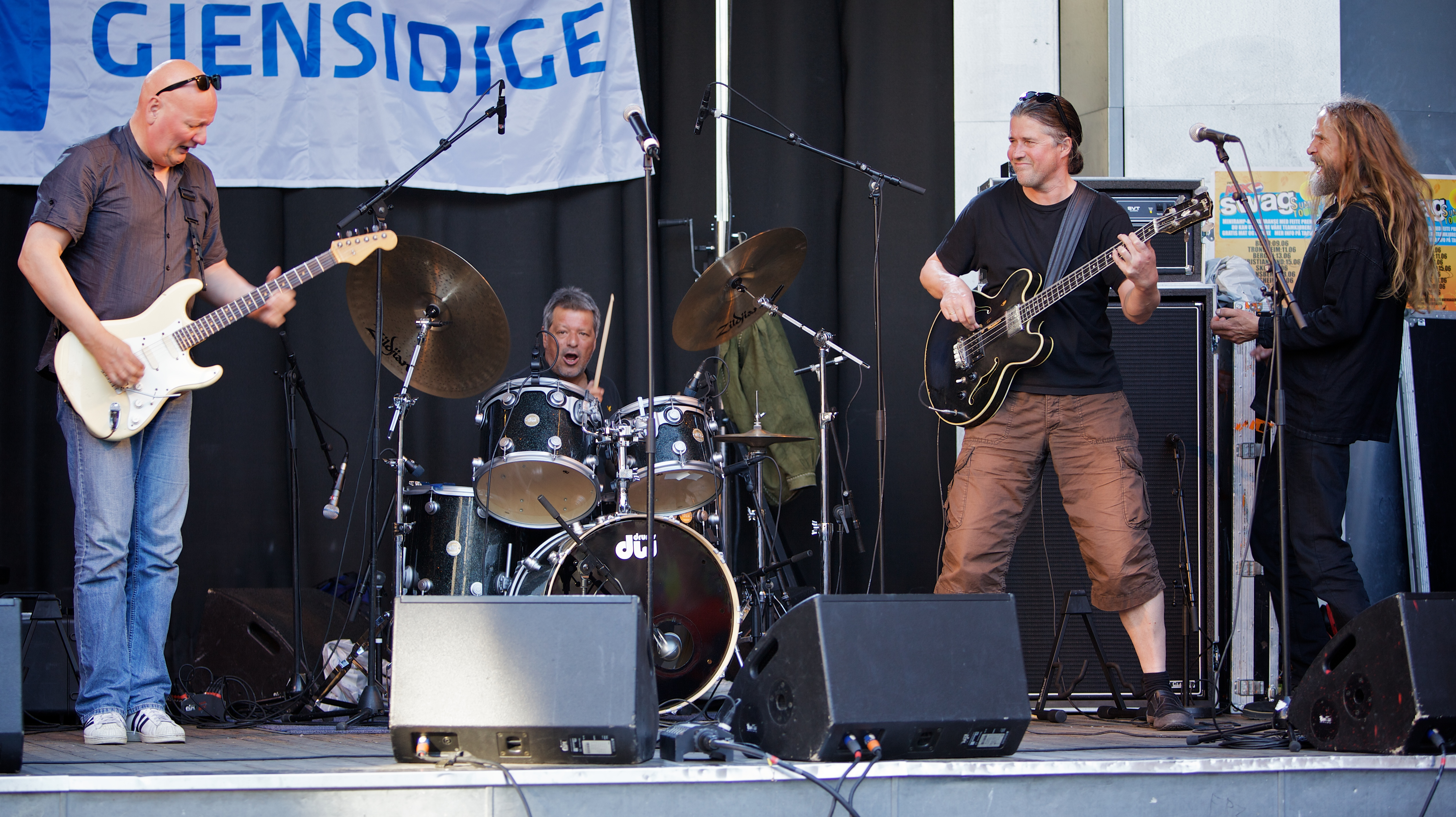
Dance With A Stranger in 2009.

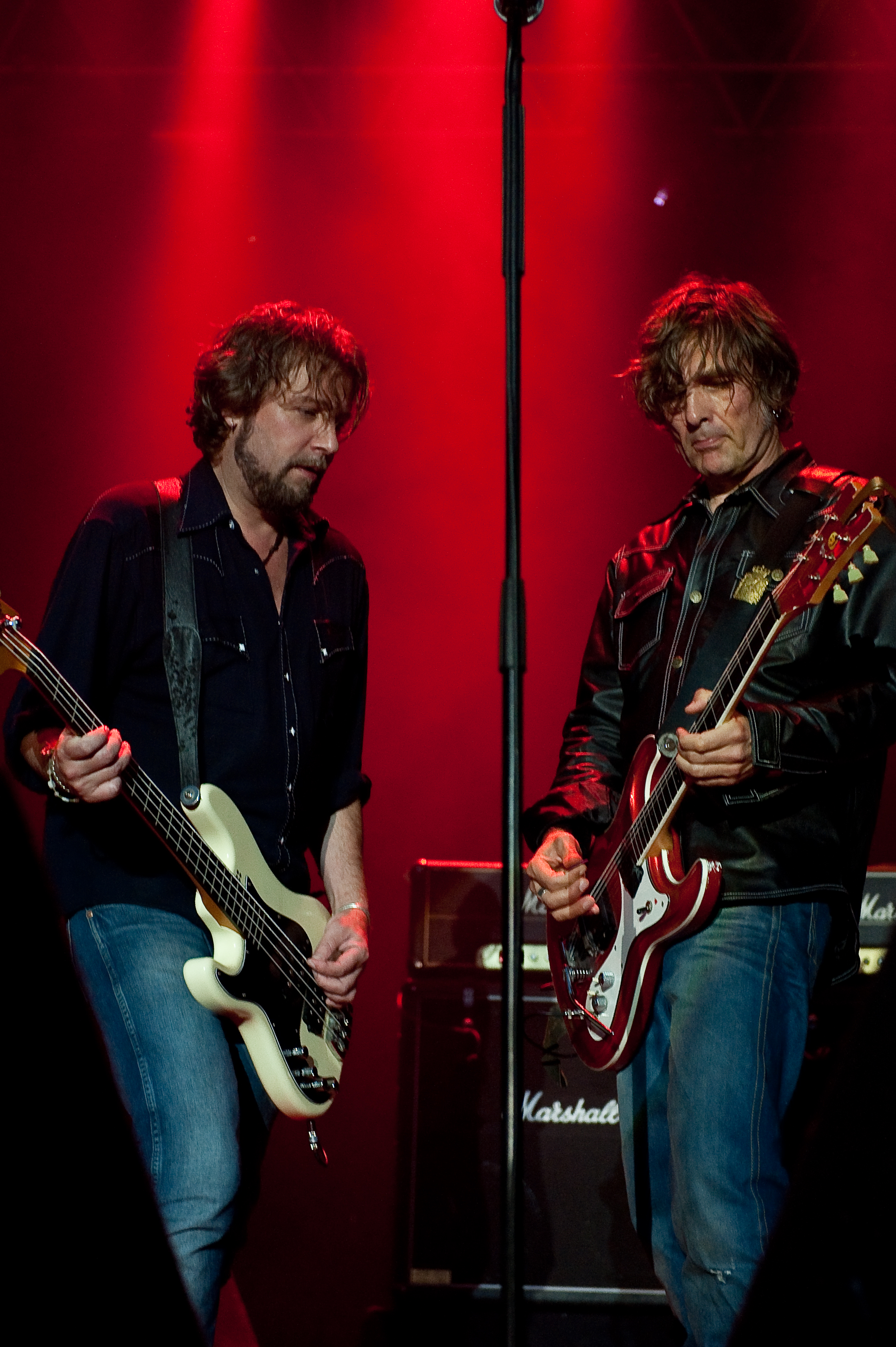
DumDum Boys at the Døgnvill Festival in Oslo.

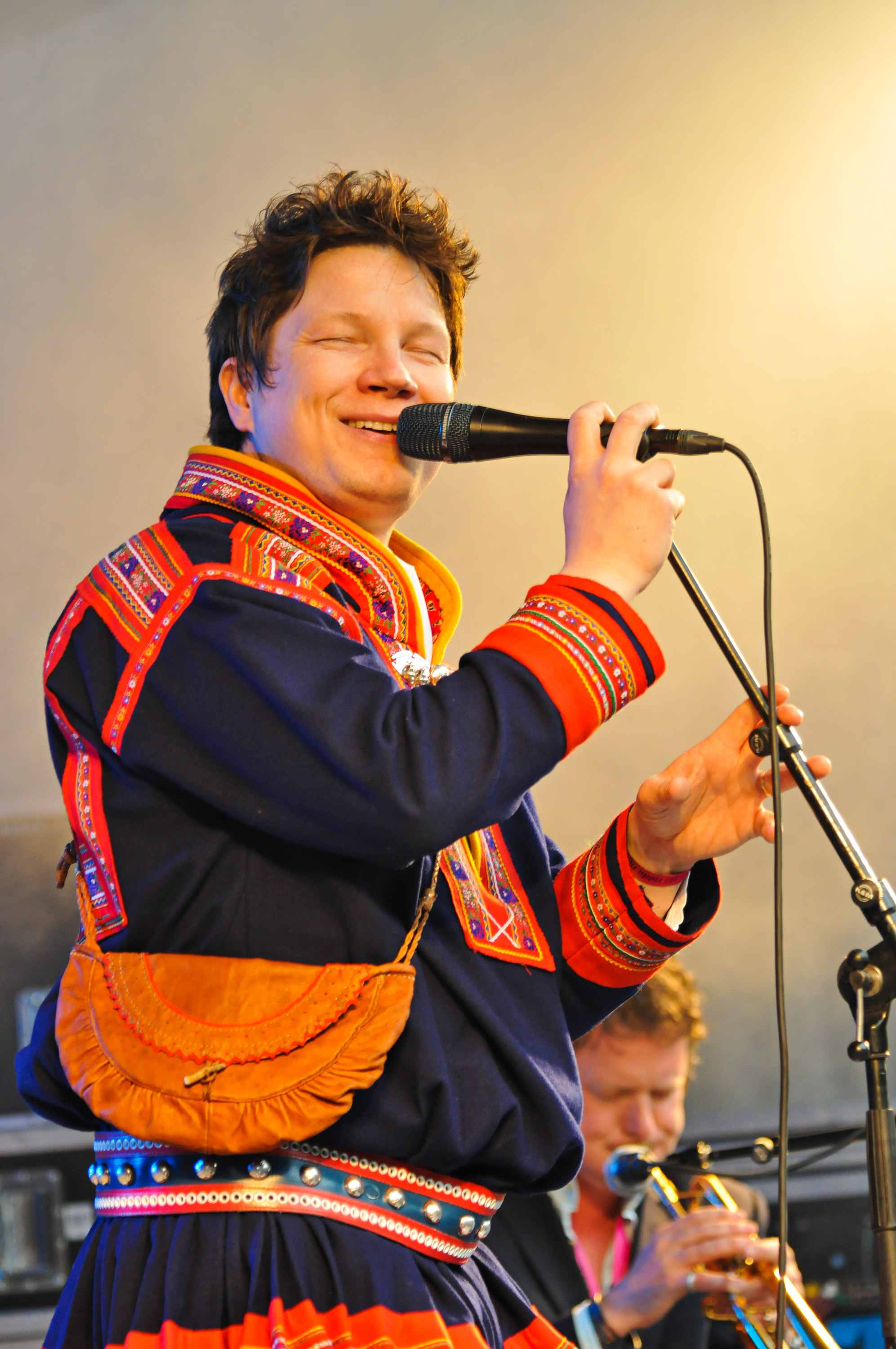
Niko Valkeapää at the Riddu Riđđu Festival in Skånland Municipality.

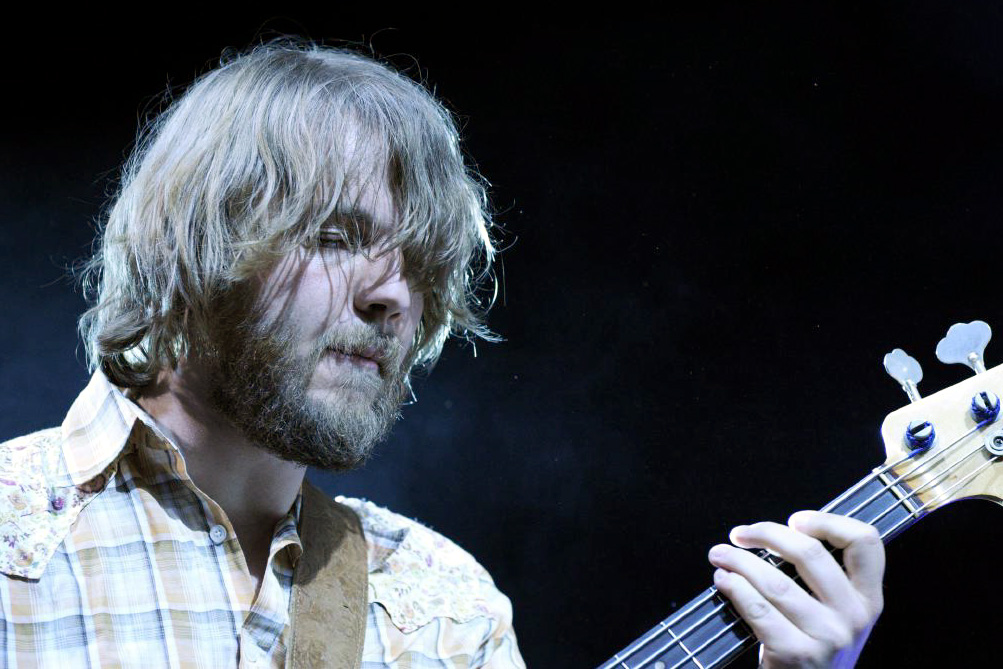
Nikolai Eilertsen at the Moers Festival.

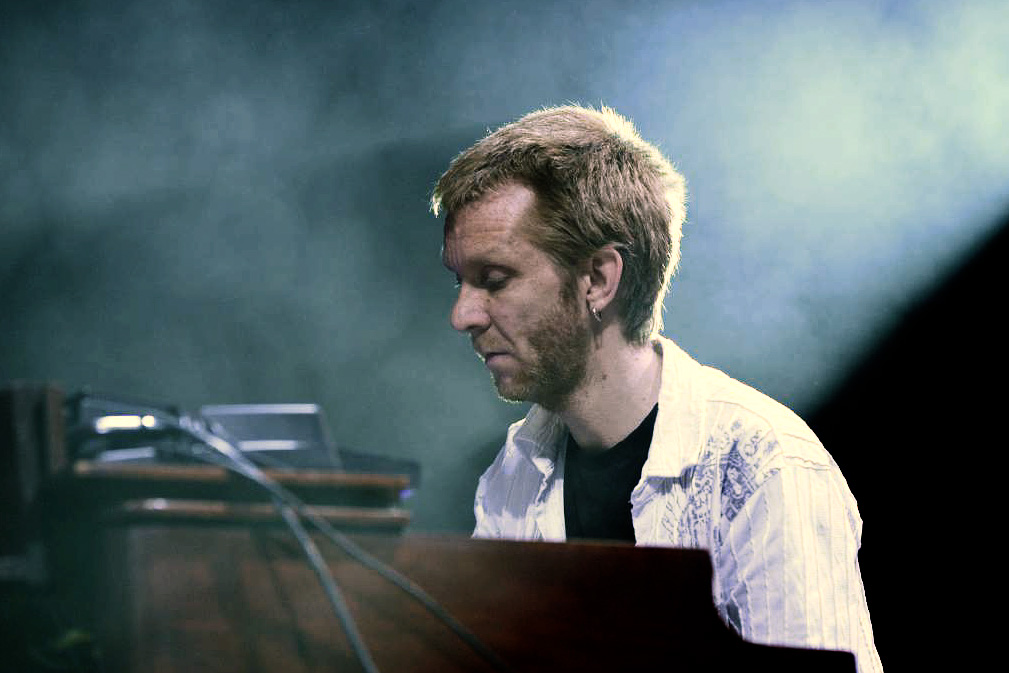
Ståle Storløkken at the Moers Festival.

The following is a list of notable events and releases of the year 2009 in Norwegian music.

== Events ==
=== January ===
- 23
  - Nordlysfestivalen started in Tromsø (January 23 – 31).
  - Marianne Beate Kielland (mezzo-soprano) was awarded the Nordlysprisen 2009 at Nordlysfestivalen.

=== February ===
- 4 – The Polarjazz Festival 2009 started in Longyearbyen (February 4–8).
- 5 – Kristiansund Opera Festival opened (February 5 – 21).

=== March ===
- 10 – Varg Vikernes was released on parole having served almost 16 years of a 21 years (life) sentence for the murder of Mayhem guitarist Euronymous.
- 18
  - Vossajazz started in Voss Municipality (March 18–20).
  - Kjetil Møster was awarded Vossajazzprisen 2009.
- 19 – Solveig Slettahjell performs the commissioned work Tarpan Seasons for Vossajazz 2009.

=== April ===
- 22 – SoddJazz 2009 started in Inderø Municipalityy, Nord-Trøndelag (April 22 – 26).
- 28 – Bergenfest 2009 started in Bergen (April 28 – May 3).

=== May ===
- 16 – Alexander Rybak won the Eurovision Song Contest 2009 with his song "Fairytale" in Moscow, giving Norway its third victory. Within a couple of days, the song reaches the top ten in charts in most of Europe, including a No. 10 entry in the UK Singles Chart.
- 20
  - The start of Bergen International Music Festival Festspillene i Bergen 2009 (May 20 – June 4).
  - Nattjazz 2010 started in Bergen (May 26 – 30).

=== June ===
- 11 – Norwegian Wood 2009 started in Oslo, Norway (June 11 – 14).
- 18 – The Norwegian Arctic Philharmonic Orchestra, Nordnorsk Opera og Symfoniorkester, was founded in Tromsø.

=== July ===
- 13 – Moldejazz started in Molde (July 13 – 18).
- 30 – The 22nd Notodden Blues Festival started in Notodden (July 30 – August 2).

=== August ===
- 9 – Oslo Jazzfestival started (August 9 – 15).
- 12 – Sildajazz starts in Haugesund (August 12 – 16).

=== September ===
- 2 – The 5th Punktfestivalen started in Kristiansand (September 2 – 5).
- 24 – The 6th Ekkofestival started in Bergen (September 24 – 26).

=== October ===
- 22 – The 8th Insomnia Festival started in Tromsø (October 22 – 24).

=== November ===
- 3 – The Oslo World Music Festival started in Oslo (November 3 – 8).
- 12 – The 4th Barents Jazz, Tromsø International Jazz Festival started (November 12 – 14).

=== December ===
- 11 – The Nobel Peace Prize Concert was held at Telenor Arena.

== Albums released ==
=== April ===
- 16 – Remembrance by Ketil Bjørnstad (ECM Records)

=== October ===
- 12 – Restored, Returned by Tord Gustavsen Ensemble (ECM Records)

=== Unknown date ===
#

A

== Deaths ==
January

- 8 – Björn Haugan, operatic lyric tenor (born 1942).

February

- 10 – Eva Gustavson, operatic contralto (born 1917).

March

- 5 – Bjørg Lødøen, painter, graphic artist, and composer (born 1931).
- 26 – Arne Bendiksen, singer, entertainer and record producer (born 1926).

May

- 1 – Torstein Grythe, founder and conductor of the Sølvguttene boys choir (born 1918).

August

- 4 – Ole A. Sørli, musician, writer, and record producer (born 1946).

November

- 6 – Kjell Bartholdsen, jazz saxophonist (stroke) (born 1938).
- 21 – Gerhard Aspheim, jazz trombonist (born 1930).

== See also ==
- 2009 in Norway
- Music of Norway
- Norway in the Eurovision Song Contest 2009
