= 2010 in Norwegian music =

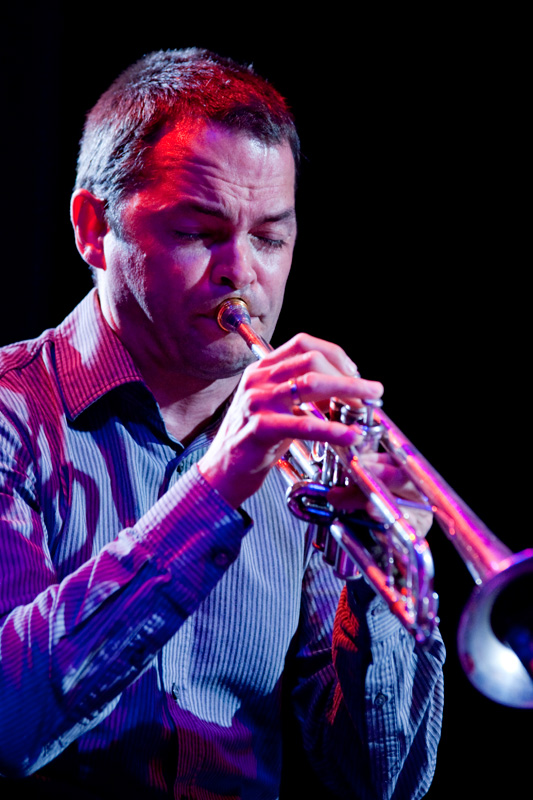
Arve Henriksen at the Moers Festival.

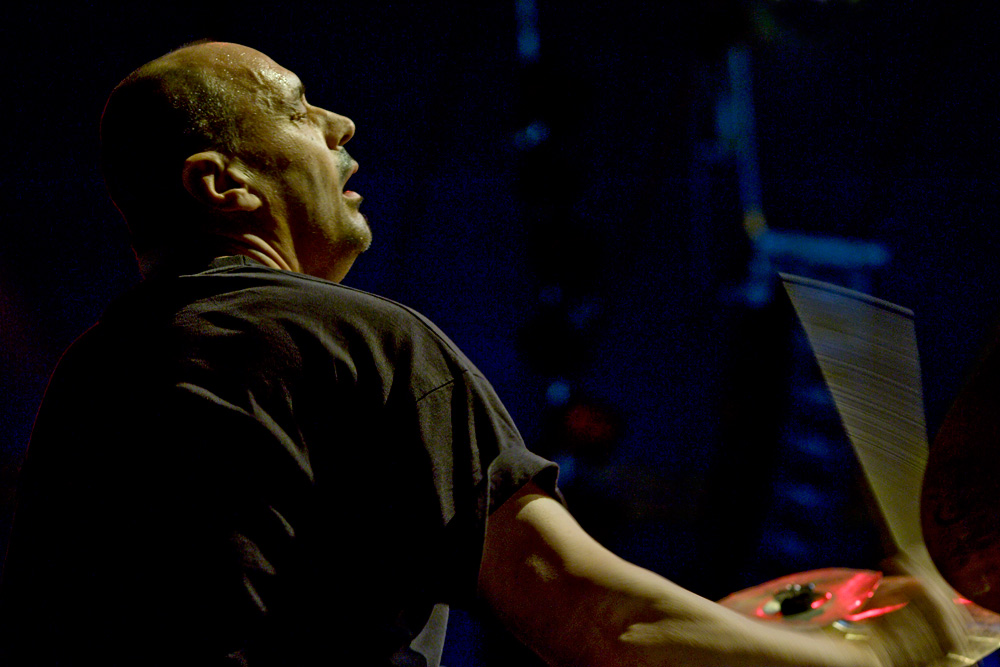
Paolo Vinaccia at the Moers Festival.

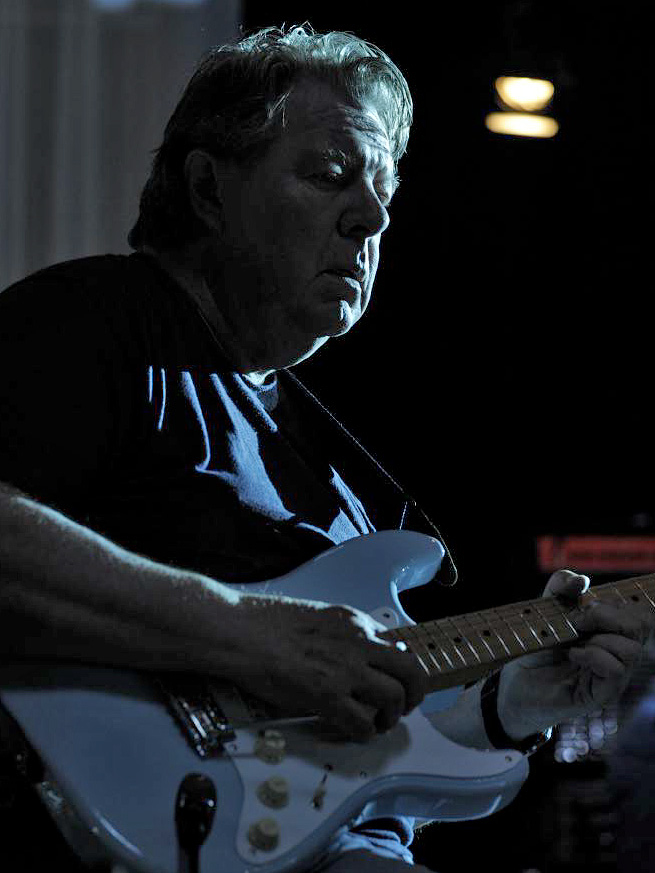
Terje Rypdal at the Moers Festival.

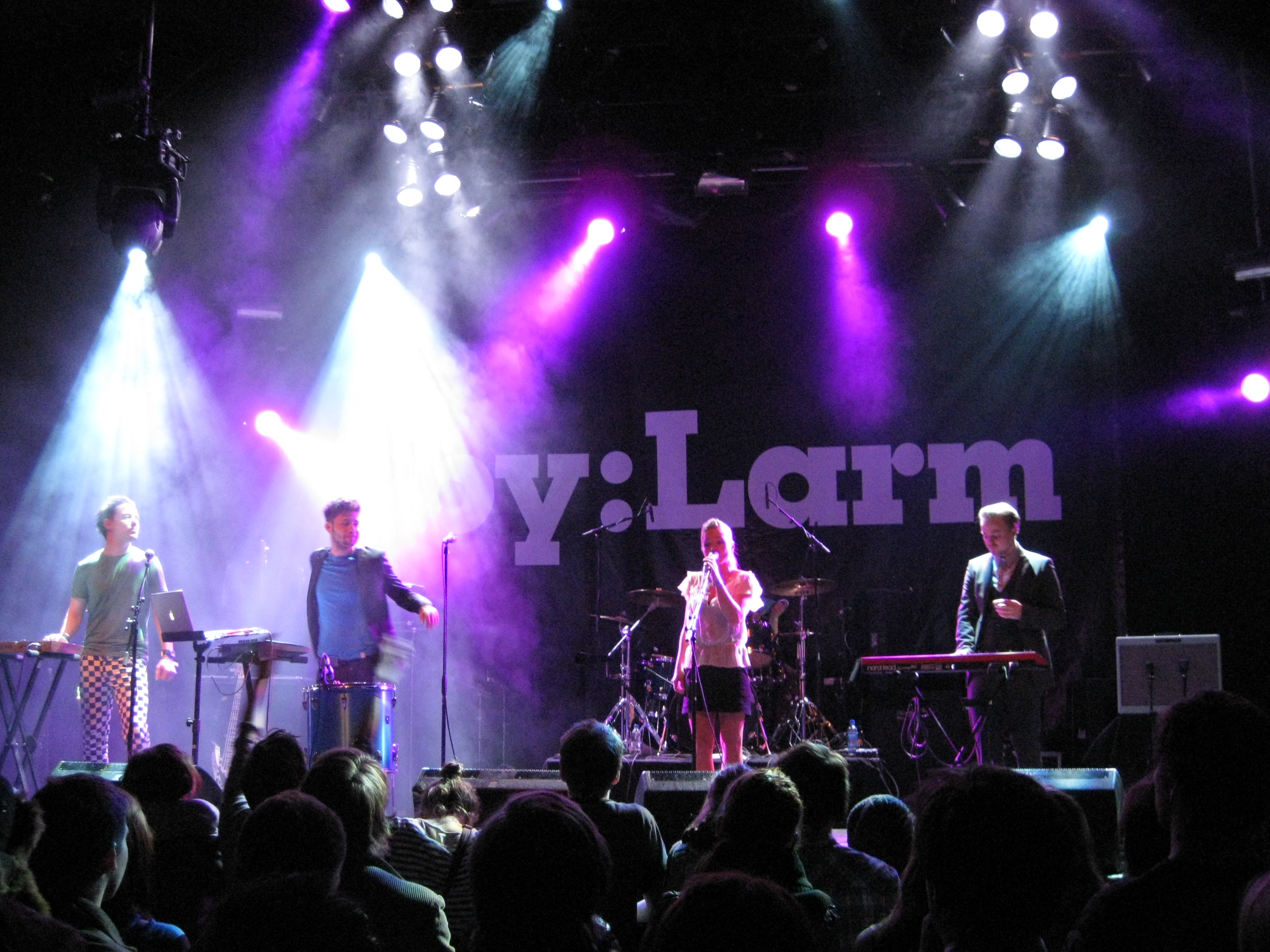
The Pink Robots at by:larm.

The following is a list of notable events and releases of the year 2010 in Norwegian music.

== Events ==
=== January ===
- 29
  - Nordlysfestivalen started in Tromsø (January 29 – February 6).
  - Bodvar Moe (bass) was awarded the Nordlysprisen 2010 at Nordlysfestivalen.

=== February ===
- 3 – The Polarjazz Festival 2010 started in Longyearbyen (February 3–7).
- 4 – Kristiansund Opera Festival opened (February 4–20).

=== March ===
- 26 Vossajazz started in Voss (April 26–28).
- 27 Stein Urheim was awarded Vossajazzprisen 2010.
- 27 Karin Krog and John Surman performs the commissioned work Songs about this and that for Vossajazz 2010.

=== April ===
- 28
  - Bergenfest 2010 started in Bergen (April 28 – May 1).
  - SoddJazz 2010 started in Inderøy Municipality, Nord-Trøndelag (April 28 – May 2).

=== May ===
- 26
  - The start of Bergen International Music Festival Festspillene i Bergen 2010 (May 26 – June 7).
  - Nattjazz 2010 started in Bergen (May 26 – June 5).
- 29 – Eurovision Song Contest 2010 was held at Telenor Arena, Bærum Municipality. The two semi finals took place on 25 and 27 May. The 2010 winner was Germany.

=== June ===
- 10 – Norwegian Wood 2010 started in Oslo, Norway (June 10 – 13).

=== July ===
- 19 – Moldejazz started in Molde (July 19–24).

=== August ===
- 5 – The 23th Notodden Blues Festival started in Notodden (August 5 – 8).
- 11 – Sildajazz starts in Haugesund (August 11–15).
- 16 – Oslo Jazzfestival started (August 16 – 22).

=== September ===
- 2 – Punktfestivalen started in Kristiansand (September 2–4).

=== October ===
- 15
  - The Ekkofestival started in Bergen (October 15 – 23).
  - The Insomnia Festival started in Tromsø (October 15 – 24).

=== November ===
- 2 – The Oslo World Music Festival started in Oslo (November 2 – 7).
- 11 – The 5th Barents Jazz, Tromsø International Jazz Festival started (November 11 – 14).

=== December ===
- 11 – The Nobel Peace Prize Concert was held at Telenor Arena.

== Albums released ==
=== January ===
- 11 – I.S. by Tore Johansen featuring Steve Swallow (Inner Ear).
- 18 – Heavy Metal Fruit by Motorpsycho (Stickman Records, Rune Grammofon).

=== March ===
- 1 – Just What the World Needs by Mads Eriksen (MTG Music).

=== April ===
- 16 – Crime Scene by Terje Rypdal & Bergen Big Band (ECM Records).
- 19 – Live Extracts by Eivind Aarset's Sonic Codex Orchestra (ECM Records).

=== July ===
- 6 – Kvelertak by Kvelertak

=== September ===
- 20 – Jan Garbarek and The Hilliard Ensemble: Officium Novum (ECM Records)

=== October ===
- 19 – Norwegian Song 3 by Dag Arnesen (Losen Records)

=== November ===
- 1 – Synlige Hjerteslag by Frida Ånnevik

=== December ===
- 16 – License To Chill by keyboardist Haakon Graf with Per Mathisen and Erik Smith (Nordic Records).

=== Unknown date ===
#

A

- Atomic – Theater Tilters Vol 1.
- Atomic – Theater Tilters Vol 2.

E

- Eple Trio – In The Clearing / In The Cavern.

H

- Daniel Herskedal – City Stories.

== New Artists ==
- Kvelertak received the Spellemannprisen award, as 'Best newcomer of the year 2010', for the album Kvelertak and was with that also recipient of the Gramo grant.
- Ferner/Juliusson was awarded the 2010 JazzIntro at the Moldejazz, Luly 21, 2010.

== Deaths ==
January

- 26 – Dag Frøland, comedian, singer and variety artist (born 1945).

February

- 10 – Kjell Solem, pop musician (born 1950)

March

- 4 – Amalie Christie, classical pianist (born 1913).

April

- 21 – Gustav Lorentzen, folk singer and entertainer in Knutsen & Ludvigsen, Cardiac arrest (born 1947).

May

- 30 – Kristian Bergheim, jazz saxophonist (born 1926).

June

- 5 – Arne Nordheim, contemporary classical experimental composer (born 1931).

July

- 15 – Knut Stensholm, rock drummer, Sambandet (born 1954).
- 23 – Willy Bakken, guitarist and popular culture writer (born 1951).

September

- 14 – Alf Kjellman, jazz saxophonist (born 1938).

October

- 5 – Jack Berntsen, philologist, songwriter and folk singer (born 1940).

== See also ==
- 2010 in Norway
- Music of Norway
- Norway in the Eurovision Song Contest 2010
