= 2005 in Norwegian music =

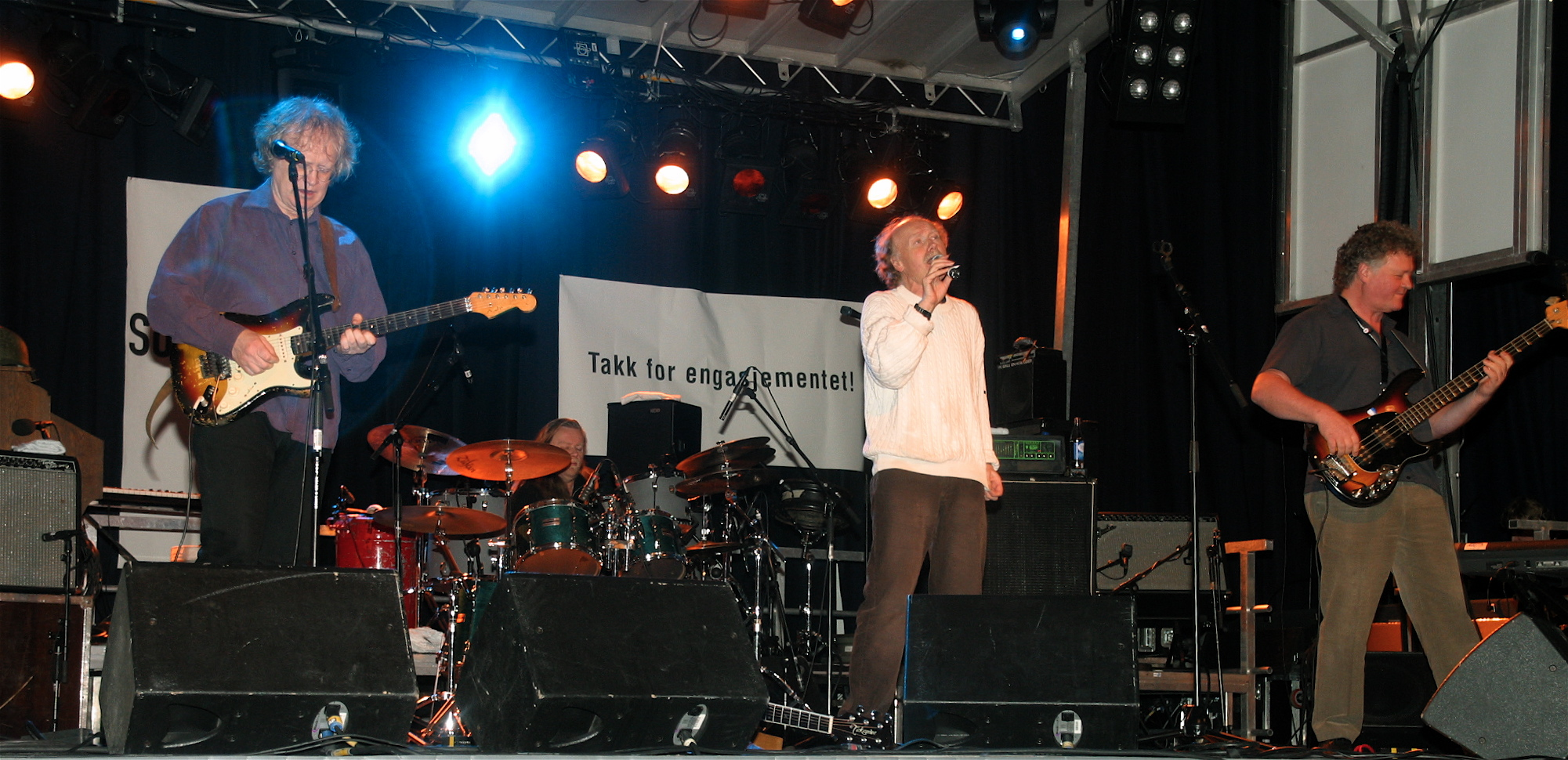
Trygve Thue with Saft in Bergen. (Photo by Nina Aldin Thune)

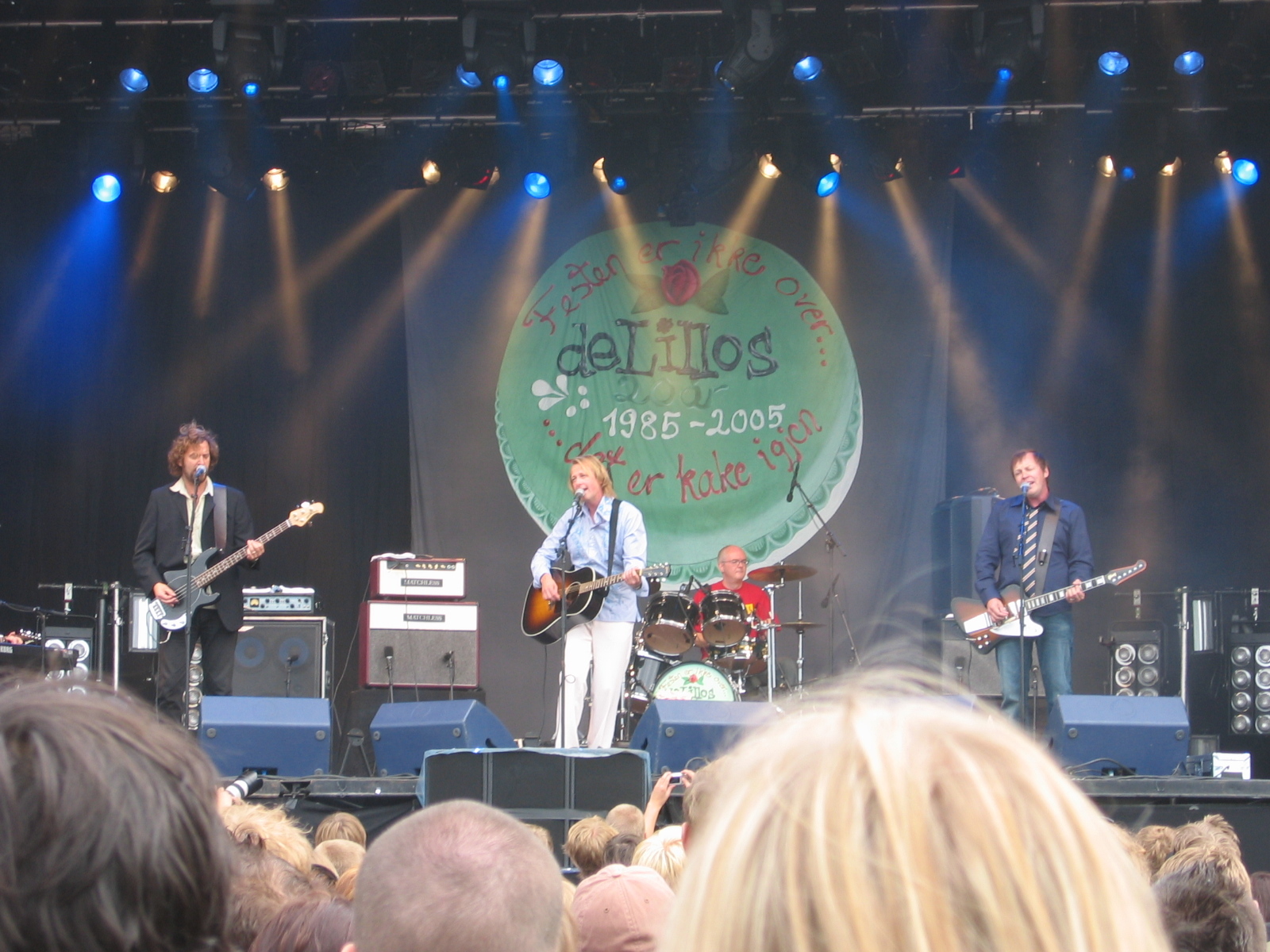
DeLillos at Øyafestivalen in Oslo.

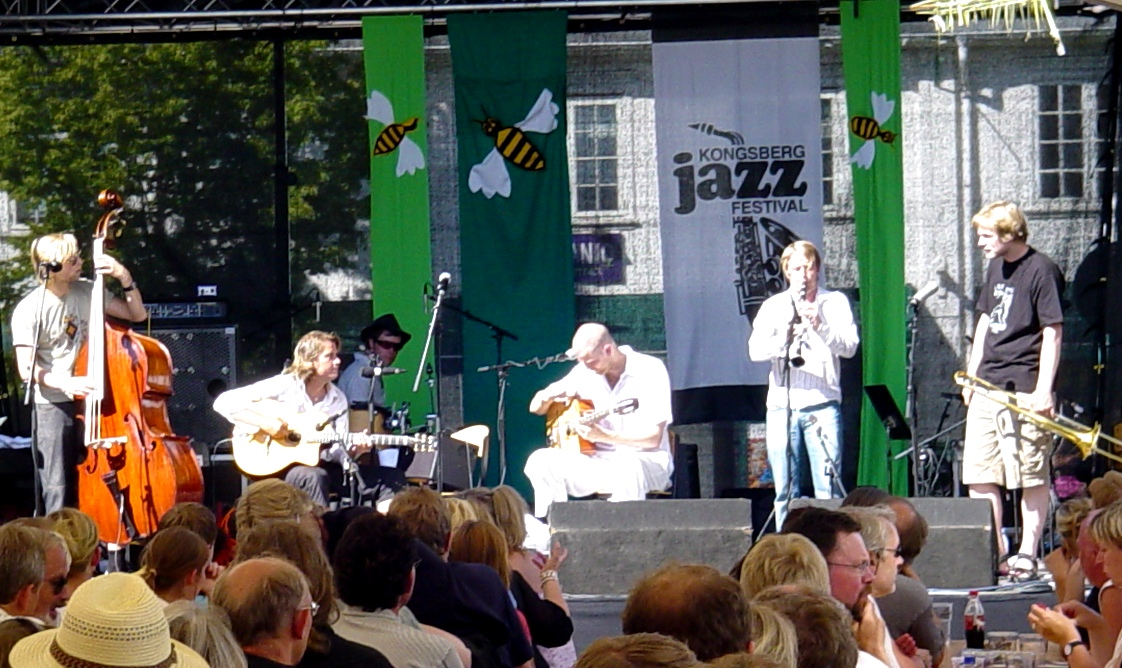
Christianssand String Swing Ensemble at the Kongsberg Jazzfestival.

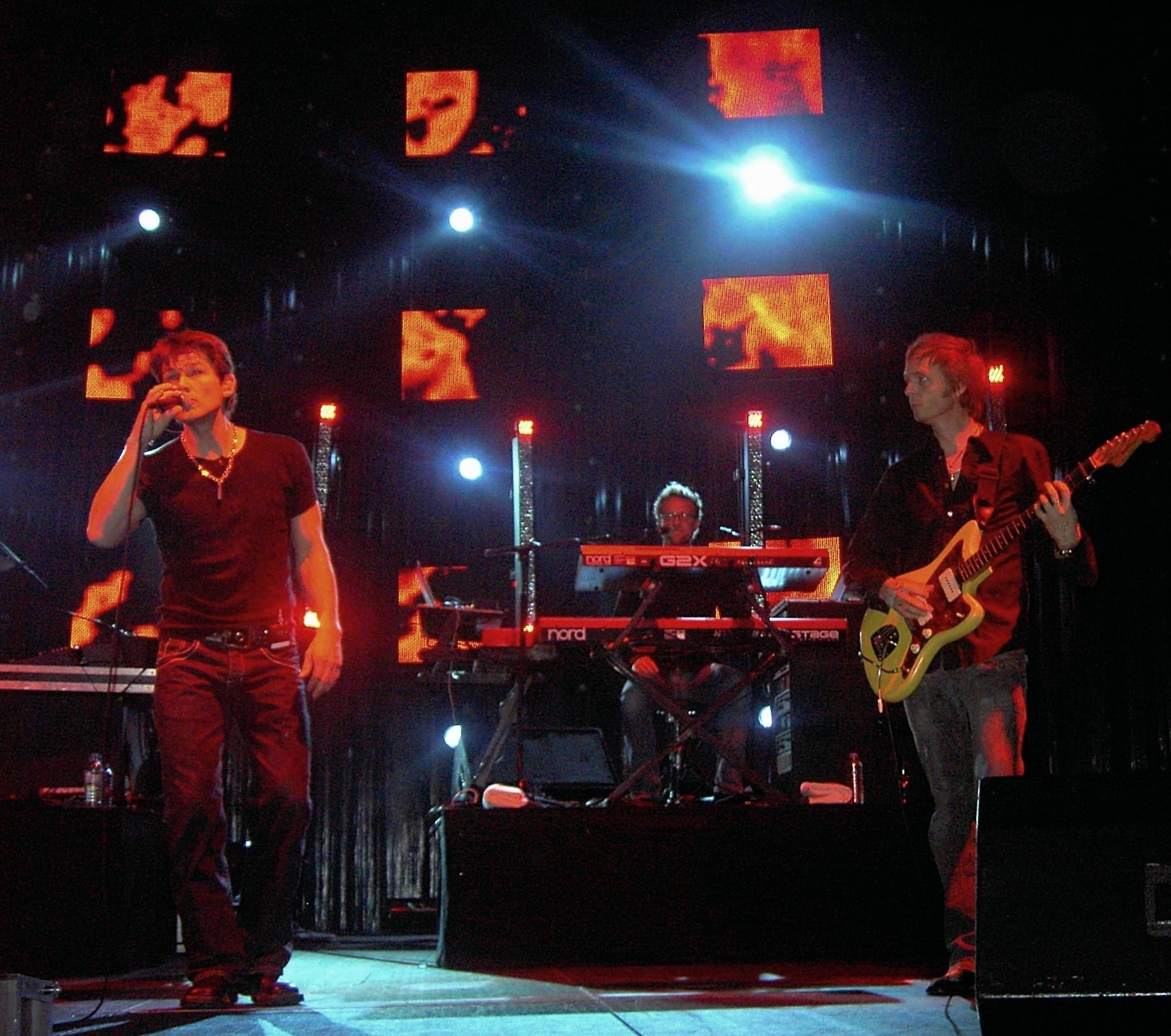
A-ha in concert.

The following is a list of notable events and releases of the year 2005 in Norwegian music.

== Events ==
=== January ===
- 27 – The 8th Polarjazz Festival started in Longyearbyen, Svalbard (January 27 – 29).

=== February ===
- 3 – Kristiansund Opera Festival opened (February 3 – 19).

=== March ===
- 18
  - The 32nd Vossajazz started at Vossavangen, Norway (March 18 – 20).
  - Berit Opheim was awarded Vossajazzprisen 2005.
- 19 – Jan Gunnar Hoff performs the commissioned work Free flow songs for Vossajazz 2005.

=== April ===
- 29 – Bergenfest started in Bergen (April 29 – May 7).

=== May ===
- 25
  - The start of Bergen International Music Festival Festspillene i Bergen (May 25 – June 5).
  - The 33rd Nattjazz started in Bergen, Norway (May 25 – June 4).

=== June ===
- 16 – Norwegian Wood started in Oslo, Norway (June 16 – 19).
- 23 – The 1st Punktfestivalen started in Kristiansand, Norway (June 23–25).

=== July ===
- 6 – The 41st Kongsberg Jazzfestival started in Kongsberg, Norway (July 6 – 8).
- 18 – The 45th Moldejazz started in Molde, Norway with Arild Andersen as artist in residence (July 18 – 23).

=== August ===
- 4 – The 18th Notodden Blues Festival started in Notodden (August 4 – 7).
- 10 – The 19th Sildajazz started in Haugesund, Norway (August 10 – 14).
- 15 – The 20th Oslo Jazzfestival started in Oslo, Norway (August 15 – 21).

=== September ===
- 15 – DølaJazz started in Lillehammer, Norway (September 15 – 18).
- 30 – Ultima Oslo Contemporary Music Festival started in Oslo, Norway (September 30 – Oktober 16).

=== Oktober ===
- 20 – The 3rd Ekkofestival started in Bergen (Oktober 20 – 23).
- 24 – The 4th Insomnia Festival started in Tromsø (October 24 – 27).

=== November ===
- 1 – The Oslo World Music Festival started in Oslo (November 1 – 6).

=== December ===
- 17 – The Hammerslagfestivalen Vinterblot started in Spiret, Tønsberg.

=== Unknown date ===
- The Rock band Accidents Never Happen was formed.

== Albums released ==
=== April ===
Day	Album	Artist	Label	Notes	Ref.
18	Electra	Arild Andersen Group	ECM Records	Produced by Arild Andersen	

=== Unknown date ===
J

Tore Johansen

- Like That (Gemini Records), featuring Karin Krog

Per Jørgensen

- Unspoken Songs (Gemini Records), with Tobias Sjögren

S

Karl Seglem

- Dikt (NorCD), with poems by Jon Fosse
- Reik (Ozella Records)

== Deaths ==
January

- 7 – Ivar Medaas, folk singer (born 1938).

June

- 29 – Mikkel Flagstad, jazz saxophonist (born 1930).

August

- 17 – Lars Kristian Brynildsen, clarinetist, Bergen Philharmonic Orchestra (born 1954).

October

- 9 – Jan Rohde, rock singer (born 1942).

November

- 10 – Vidar Sandbeck, folk singer and author (born 1918).

== See also ==
- 2005 in Norway
- Music of Norway
- Norway in the Eurovision Song Contest 2005
- 2005 in Swiss music
