= 1926 in Norwegian music =

The following is a list of notable events and releases of the year 1926 in Norwegian music.

== Deaths ==
September

- 9 – Anton Jörgen Andersen, composer and cellist (born 1845).

== Births ==
January

- 9 – Randi Hultin, jazz critic and impresario (died 2000).

March

- 1 – Erik Bye, journalist, artist, author, film actor, folk singer and radio and television personality (died 2004).

June

- 6 – Kristian Bergheim, jazz saxophonist (died 2010).

July

- 7 – Jostein Eriksen, opera singer (died 2015).

October

- 19 – Arne Bendiksen, singer, composer and record producer (died 2009).

November

- 21 – Odd Børretzen, author, illustrator, translator, text writer, folk singer, and artist (died 2012).

December

- 10 – Dag Schjelderup-Ebbe, musicologist, composer, music critic and biographer (died 2013).

== See also ==
- 1926 in Norway
- Music of Norway
