= 2003 in Norwegian music =

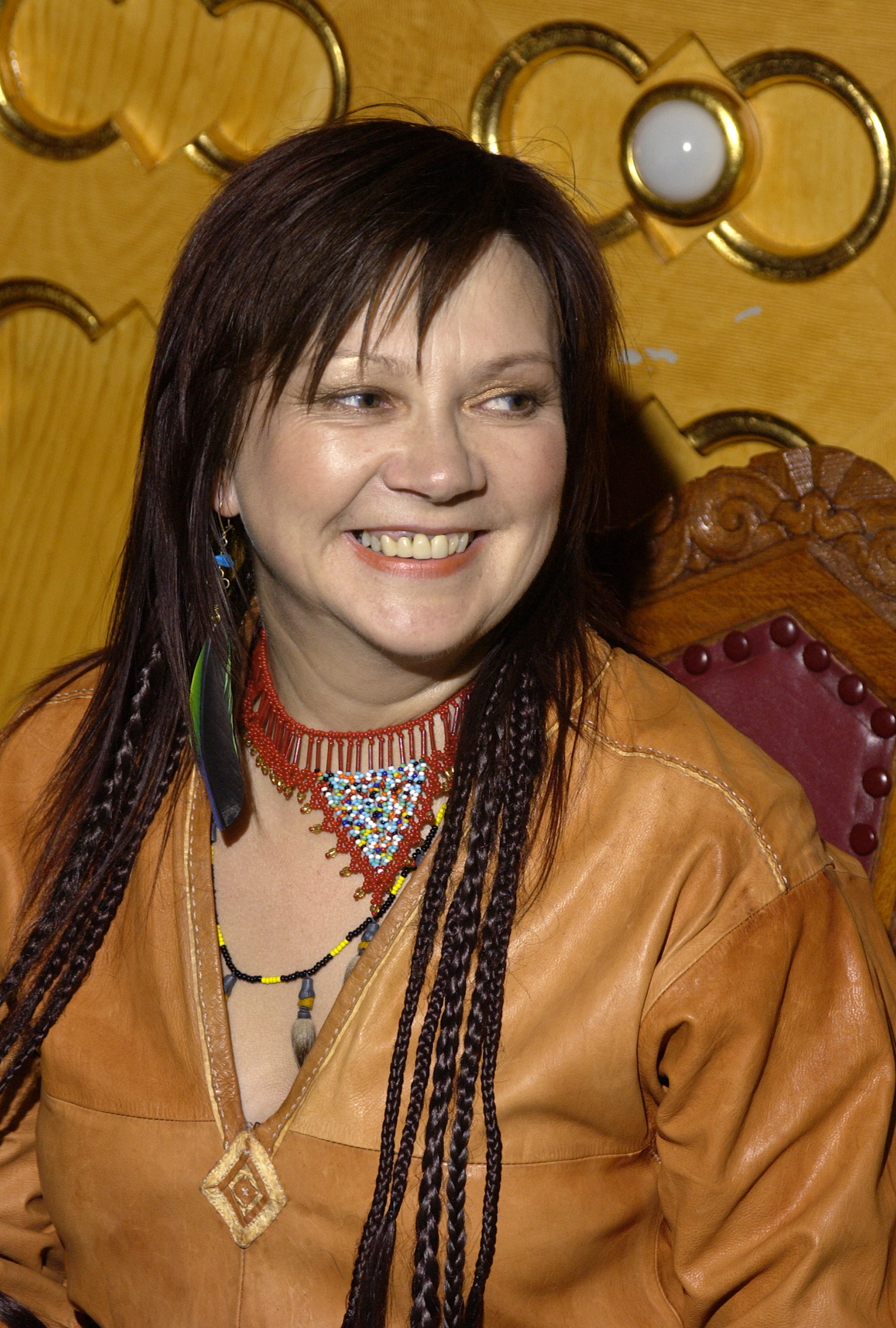
Mari Boine receiving an award given by Nordic Council at the session in Oslo, 2003.

The following is a list of notable events and releases of the year 2003 in Norwegian music.

== Events ==
=== January ===
- 17 – The 22nd annual Djangofestival started on Cosmopolite in Oslo, Norway (January 17 – 19).
- 30 – The 6th Polarjazz started in Longyearbyen, Svalbard (January 30 – February 2).

=== February ===
- 6 – Kristiansund Opera Festival opened (February 6 – 22).

=== March ===
- 13 – The annual By:Larm started in Trondheim (March 13 – 16).

=== April ===
- 11
  - The 30th Vossajazz started at Vossavangen (April 11 – 13).
  - Kåre Opheim was awarded Vossajazzprisen 2003.
- 3 – Terje Rypdal performs the commissioned work Vossabrygg for Vossajazz 2003.
- 25 – Ole Blues started in Bergen (April 25 – May 3).

=== May ===
- 6 – The 14th MaiJazz started in Stavanger (May 6 – 10).
- 21
  - The start of Bergen International Music Festival Festspillene i Bergen (May 21 – June 1).
  - The 31st Nattjazz 2004 started in Bergen (May 21 – 31).

=== June ===
- 13 – Norwegian Wood started in Oslo (June 13 – 15).

=== July ===
- 2 – The 39th Kongsberg Jazzfestival started in Kongsberg (July 2 – 5).
- 12 – The 43rd Moldejazz started in Molde (July 12 – 17).
- 31 – The 16th Notodden Blues Festival started in Notodden (July 31 – August 3).

=== August ===
- 6 – The 17th Sildajazz started in Haugesund (August 6 – 10).
- 7 – The annual Øyafestivalen started in Oslo (August 7 – 9).
- 11 – The 18th Oslo Jazzfestival started in Oslo (August 11 – 17).

=== September ===
- 3 – The 2nd Insomnia Festival started in Tromsø (September 3 – 6).
- 30 – The 1st Ekkofestival started in Bergen (September 30 – Oktober 3.

=== October ===
- 1 – The DølaJazz started in Lillehammer.
- 2 – The Ultima Oslo Contemporary Music Festival started in Oslo (October 2 – 12).
- 31 – The Trondheim Jazz Festival started in Trondheim (October 31 – November 8).

=== November ===
- 4 – The Oslo World Music Festival started in Oslo (November 4 – 9).

=== December ===
- 11– The Nobel Peace Prize Concert was held in Oslo Spektrum.

== Albums released ==
=== March ===
Day	Album	Artist	Label	Notes	Ref.
27	Likferd	Windir	Head Not Found		

=== November ===
Day	Album	Artist	Label	Notes	Ref.
03	Dina	Dina	Universal Music Group	Contains hit song "Bli Hos Meg"	
10	Julegløggen	Frode Alnæs, Arild Andersen, Stian Carstensen	Kirkelig Kulturverksted	Produced by Erik Hillestad	

=== Unknown date ===
A

Arild Andersen

- Moon Water (NorCD), with Carsten Dahl and Patrice Heral

B

Jon Balke

- Trialogue (Jazzland Recordings), with Lars Møller and Morten Lund

I

Terje Isungset

- Middle Of Mist (Jazzland Recordings)

N

Paal Nilssen-Love

- Schlinger (Smalltown Supersound), with Håkon Kornstad

== Births ==
April

- 11 – Aksel Rykkvin, boy soprano.

== Deaths ==
January

June

- 5 – Ola Calmeyer, jazz pianist (born 1930).

November

- 6 – Hallvard Johnsen, composer and flautist (born 1916).

December

- 12 – Peder Alhaug, tenor (born 1921).

== See also ==
- 2003 in Norway
- Music of Norway
- Norway in the Eurovision Song Contest 2003
- 2003 in jazz
