= 1931 in Norwegian music =

The following is a list of notable events and releases of the year 1931 in Norwegian music.

== Deaths ==
January

- 20 – Margrethe Munthe, teacher, children's writer, songwriter, and playwright (born 1860).

May

- 3 – Otto Winter-Hjelm, composer, known especially for his operas.musician, conductor, writer, composer, and music critic (born 1837).

== Births ==
January

- 26 – Kaare Ørnung, pianist and music teacher (died 2013).

June

- 520 – Arne Nordheim, composer (died 2010).

July

- 29 – Kjell Karlsen, band leader, composer, arranger, jazz pianist and organist (died 2020).

December

- 7 – Bjørg Lødøen, painter, graphic artist, and composer (died 2009).

== See also ==
- 1931 in Norway
- Music of Norway
