= Belly flop =

Jump into water landing on ones belly

A belly flop is a dive in which the front of the body strikes the surface of the water horizontally. They are often executed accidentally, although several contests have been held.

== Technique ==
A belly flop involves falling or diving into water such that the front of the body strikes the surface of the water horizontally. A traditional dive involves the body entering the water as narrowly as possible, breaking its surface tension and displacing water more gradually. During a belly flop, more force is applied to the body because of the larger surface area hitting the water at once, displacing more water, slowing the body down more abruptly, and breaking a larger area of surface tension. As a result, belly flops are painful and potentially dangerous.

== Contests ==
There have been many belly flop contests held either as a form of extreme sport due to the danger and pain involved, or for humorous purposes. Contests are often judged on the size of the splash, sound of the person hitting the water, and originality or style. There is an annual charity contest at Water World in Colorado on Father's Day.

== See also ==
- Death diving or Døds Diving, a Norwegian extreme sport in which participants high dive, landing front-first and horizontally, but tuck into a fetal position just before hitting the water
