= 1998 in Norwegian music =

The following is a list of notable events and releases of the year 1998 in Norwegian music.

== Events ==
=== February ===
- 16 – The 1st Polarjazz started in Longyearbyen, Svalbard (February 16 – 18).

=== April ===
- 3 – The 25th Vossajazz started in Vossavangen, Norway (April 3 – 5).

=== May ===
- 6 – The 9th MaiJazz started in Stavanger, Norway (May 6 – 10).
- 20 – The 26th Nattjazz started in Bergen, Norway (May 20 – 31).

=== June ===
- 6 – The Norwegian Wood started in Oslo, Norway (June 6 – 7).

=== July ===
- 13 – The 38th Moldejazz started in Molde, Norway (July 13 – 18).

=== August ===
- 6 – The 11th Notodden Blues Festival started in Notodden (August 6 – 9).
- 12 – The 12th Sildajazz started in Haugesund, Norway (August 12 – 16).
- 26 – The last Kalvøyafestivalen was canceled at Kalvøya near by Oslo.

== Albums released ==
=== October ===
- 5 – Rites (ECM Records), by Jan Garbarek

=== Unknown date ===
B

Jon Balke

- Saturation (Jazzland Recordings)
- Rotor (Curling Legs), with Cikada String Quartet

Ketil Bjørnstad

- The Sea II (ECM Recordings), with David Darling, Jon Christensen, and Terje Rypdal

K

Bjørn Kruse

- Song For Winter (Works For Choir) (Aurora Records)

== Deaths ==
May

- 20 – Robert Normann, jazz guitarist (born 1916).

June

- 14 – Hans W. Brimi, fiddler and farmer (born 1917).

December

- 4 – Egil «Bop» Johansen, jazz drummer (born 1934).

== Births ==
April

- 25 – Ella Marie Hætta Isaksen, Sami singer and yoiker.

== See also ==
- 1998 in Norway
- Music of Norway
- Norway in the Eurovision Song Contest 1998
