= 1923 in Norwegian music =

The following is a list of notable events and releases of the year 1923 in Norwegian music.

== Deaths ==
December

- 31 – Olaus Andreas Grøndahl, conductor, singing teacher, and composer (born 1847).

== Births ==
January

- 7 – Paul Weeden, American-born jazz guitarist (died 2011)
- 20 – Nora Brockstedt, singer (died 2015).

February

- 2 – Sverre Bruland, trumpet player and conductor (died 2013).

April

- 2 – Fredrik Friis, composer, lyricist, and singer (died 2008).

June

- 10 – Aase Nordmo Løvberg, opera singer (died 2013).

July

- 31 – Bjarne Nerem, jazz saxophonist and clarinetist (died 1991).

August

- 1 – Erling Stordahl, farmer and singer (died 1994).
- 21 – Carsten Klouman, pianist, arranger and composer (died 2004).

== See also ==
- 1923 in Norway
- Music of Norway
