= 1997 in Norwegian music =

The following is a list of notable events and releases of the year 1997 in Norwegian music.

== Events ==
=== March ===
- 21 – The 24th Vossajazz started in Vossavangen, Norway (March 21 – 23).

=== May ===
- 21 – The 25th Nattjazz started in Bergen, Norway (May 21 – 31).

=== June ===
- 13 – The Norwegian Wood started in Oslo, Norway (June 13 – 15).
- 28 – What should be the last Kalvøyafestivalen started at Kalvøya near by Oslo (June 28 – 29).

=== July ===
- 12 – The 37th Moldejazz started in Molde, Norway (July 12 – 19).

=== August ===
- 7 – The 10th Notodden Blues Festival started in Notodden (August 7 – 10).

=== Unknown date ===
- The band TINGeLING was initiated.

== Albums released ==
=== Unknown date ===
K

Olga Konkova

- Going With The Flow (Curling Legs), with Carl Morten Iversen and Audun Kleive

== Deaths ==
March

- 23 — Arnljot Kjeldaas, composer and organist (born 1916).

November

- 30 – Alfred Næss, playwright and songwriter (born 1927).

December

- 10 — Karsten Andersen, orchestra conductor (born 1920).
- 12 — Søren Gangfløt, organist and composer (born 1921).

== Births ==
August

- 24 – Alan Walker, music producer and DJ.

== See also ==
- 1997 in Norway
- Music of Norway
- Norway in the Eurovision Song Contest 1997
