= Solhaug =

Solhaug is a Norwegian surname. Notable people with the surname include:

- Arne J. Solhaug (born 1942), Norwegian educator, singer, composer, and author
- Karsten Anker Solhaug (1914–2012), Norwegian salvationist
