= 1942 in Norwegian music =

The following is a list of notable events and releases of the year 1942 in Norwegian music.

== Deaths ==
May

- 2 – Alfred Evensen, musician and band leader, Norwegian Army Band (born 1883).
- 23 – Harald Lie, composer (born 1902).

September

- 13 – Catharinus Elling, music teacher, organist, folk music collector and composer (born 1858).

== Births ==
April

- 1 – Jan Fredrik Christiansen, principal trumpeter of the Oslo Philharmonic Orchestra (1973-2007).
- 21 – Jon Mostad, composer.

June

- 17 – Torgrim Sollid, jazz and traditional folk trumpeter, and composer and musician.
- 21 – Ditlef Eckhoff, jazz trumpeter.

July

- 4 – Jan Rohde, rock singer (died 2005).

August

- 25 – Terje Fjærn, musician, orchestra leader and musical conductor (died 2016).

September

- 5 – Björn Haugan, operatic lyric tenor (died 2009).
- 25 – Arne J. Solhaug, assistant professor at Norges Musikkhøgskole, cantor of Grønland Church.

October

- 2 – Gro Sandvik, classical flautist.

December

- 23 – Grynet Molvig, actress and singer.

Unknown date

- Richard Badendyck, Jazz singer and pianist

== See also ==
- 1942 in Norway
- Music of Norway
