= 1958 in Norwegian music =

The following is a list of notable events and releases of the year 1958 in Norwegian music.

== Events ==
=== May ===
- The 6th Bergen International Festival started in Bergen, Norway.

== Deaths ==
May

- 28 – Ragnar Steen, guitarist and band leader (born 1904).

January

- 18 – Maja Flagstad, pianist, choral conductor, and répétiteur (born 1871).

November

- 4 – Johan Backer Lunde, songwriter, folk poet and revue writer (born 1874).
- 20 – Arne Svendsen, songwriter, folk poet and revue writer (born 1884).

== Births ==
January

- 27 – Tellef Øgrim, fretless guitarist, composer, and journalist.
- 30 – Bjørn Klakegg, jazz guitarist and composer, Needlepoint.

February

- 5 – Lage Fosheim, singer, The Monroes, (died 2013).
- 13 – Øivind Elgenes, vocalist, guitarist, and composer, Dance with a Stranger.

March

- 19 – Anne-Marie Giørtz, vocalist, orchestra conductor, singing teacher.

April

- 19 – Ragnar Bjerkreim, composer with film scores as his specialty.

May

- 12 – Ánde Somby, traditional Sami joik artist.
- 13 – Henning Kvitnes, singer and songwriter.

July

- 18 – Gabriel Fliflet, vocalist, accordionist, and composer.

August

- 20 – Marius Müller, guitarist, vocalist, songwriter, and record producer (died 1999).
- 25 – Bjarte Engeset, classical conductor.

September

- 3 – Lakki Patey, guitarist and inventor.

October

- 22 – Jan Gunnar Hoff, jazz pianist and composer.
- 30 – Olav Dale, jazz saxophonist, composer, and orchestra leader (died 2014).

December

- 26 – Lynni Treekrem, singer and composer.

== See also ==
- 1958 in Norway
- Music of Norway
