= 1934 in Norwegian music =

The following is a list of notable events and releases of the year 1934 in Norwegian music.

== Deaths ==
November

- 21 – Mon Schjelderup, composer and pianist (born 1870).

== Births ==
January

- 24 – Egil «Bop» Johansen, jazz drummer, teacher, composer (died 1998).

December

- 5 – Kåre Grøttum, jazz pianist, composer, music arranger, and program presenter in NRK.

Unknown date

- Siss Hartmann, singer (died 2011)

== See also ==
- 1934 in Norway
- Music of Norway
