= 1884 in Norwegian music =

The following is a list of notable events and releases of the year 1884 in Norwegian music.

== Births ==
December

- 11 – Arne Svendsen, songwriter, folk poet and revue writer. (died 1958).

== See also ==
- 1884 in Norway
- Music of Norway
