= 1921 in Norwegian music =

The following is a list of notable events and releases of the year 1921 in Norwegian music.

== Deaths ==
June

- 7 – Knut Dahle, hardingfele fiddler (born 1834).

July

- 29 – Christian Haslerud, composer and choral conductor (born 1812).

== Births ==
May

- 7 – Reidar Bøe, singer and composer (died 1969).

April

- 20 – Søren Gangfløt, organist and composer (died 1997).

October

- 18 – Willy Andresen, jazz pianist and orchestra leader (died 2016).

December

- 7 – Arne Dørumsgaard, composer, poet, translator and music collector (died 2006).
- 19 – Peder Alhaug, tenor (died 2003).

== See also ==
- 1921 in Norway
- Music of Norway
