= 1947 in Norwegian music =

The following is a list of notable events and releases of the year 1947 in Norwegian music.

== Events ==
- Edvard Fliflet Bræin made his debut as an orchestra conductor in Bergen.

== Deaths ==
May

- 23 – Per Kvist, revue writer, entertainer, stage actor, film actor and children's writer (born 1890).

June

- 28 – Per Steenberg, organist and composer (born 1870).

== Births ==
January

- 24 – Øystein Sunde, folk singer and guitarist.

February

- 9 – Ole Paus, folk singer and guitarist (died 2023).
- 15 – Wenche Myhre, singer and actress.
- 19 – Øystein Dolmen, singer and songwriter, Knutsen & Ludvigsen.

March

- 4 – Jan Garbarek, jazz saxophonist and composer.
- 29 – Aage Kvalbein, cellist and professor at the Norwegian Academy of Music.
- 30 – Terje Venaas, jazz upright bassist.
- 31 – Kjell Mørk Karlsen, composer and organist.

April

- 1 – Fred Nøddelund, jazz flugelhornist and band leader (died 2016).
- 30 – Finn Kalvik, singer and songwriter.

May

- 1 – Gunnar Germeten Jr., composer (died 1999).
- 9 – Pernille Anker, actor and singer (died 1999).

June

- 13 – Ketil Haugsand, harpsichordist and conductor.

July

- 3 – Grethe Kausland, singer, performer and actress (died 2007).

August

- 2 – Ruth Bakke, organist and composer.
- 23 – Terje Rypdal, guitarist and composer.

September

- 25 – Torhild Staahlen, operatic mezzo-soprano at Norwegian National Opera (died 2021).
- 28 – Gustav Lorentzen, folk singer and entertainer in Knutsen & Ludvigsen (died 2010).

December

== See also ==
- 1947 in Norway
- Music of Norway
