= 1930 in Norwegian music =

The following is a list of notable events and releases of the year 1930 in Norwegian music.

== Deaths ==
January

- 1 – Peter Brynie Lindeman, organist, cellist, and composer (born 1858).

June

- 16 – Hannah Løvenskiold, composer (born 1860).

December

- 1 – Michael Flagstad, violinist and conductor (born 1869).
- 29 – Oscar Borg, composer and conductor (born 1851).

== Births ==
January

- 9 – Tone Groven Holmboe, composer and music teacher (died 2020).

April

- 14 – Ola Calmeyer, jazz pianist (died 2003).
- 23 – Mikkel Flagstad, jazz saxophonist (died 2005).

May

- 6 – Kjell Bækkelund, classical pianist (died 2004).
- 11 – Elisabeth Granneman, singer, songwriter, children's writer and actress (died 1992).

July

- 27 – Einar Iversen, jazz pianist and composer (died 2019).

September

- 27 – Gerhard Aspheim, jazz trombonist (died 2009).

December

- 20 – Jan Elgarøy, organist and composer (died 2018).

== See also ==
- 1930 in Norway
- Music of Norway
