= Finn Benestad =

Norwegian musicologist and music critic (1929–2012)

- Born: 30 October 1929; Kristiansand, Norway
- Died: 30 April 2012 (aged 82)
- Education: University of Oslo
- Occupation: musicologist
- Known for: long-term research on composer Edvard Grieg
- Notable work: Edvard Grieg – mennesket og kunstneren
- Awards: Order of St. Olav

Finn Benestad (30 October 1929, Kristiansand – 30 April 2012, Kristiansand) was a Norwegian musicologist and music critic. He was a professor at the University of Oslo from 1965 to 1998, and is probably best known for his long-term research on composer Edvard Grieg.

== Life and career ==
Benestad was born in Kristiansand as the son of Harald Martin Benestad and Ellen Kittelsen. He married Inge Bergliot Rosendal in 1951. He graduated in musicology from the University of Oslo in 1953. He worked as a school teacher in Oslo from 1950 to 1959, and was assigned a position at the University from 1960 to 1961. In 1961 he was appointed professor at the Teachers' College (later merged into the Norwegian University of Science and Technology) in Trondheim, and from 1965 to 1998 he was a professor at the University of Oslo.

Among his books is a study of composer Johannes Haarklou from 1961, Waldemar Thrane from 1961, and Musikklære (English: Music theory) from 1963. He published the songbooks Skolens visebok (English: Songbook for schools) in 1972 (co-edited with Klakegg and Lunde), and Syng med (English: Sing along) in 1988.

He co-wrote the biography Edvard Grieg – mennesket og kunstneren together with Dag Schjelderup-Ebbe in 1980, a work that has been translated to several languages, including English, German and Russian. (English title Edvard Grieg. The Man and the Artist). From 1980 to 2004 he chaired the committee responsible for publishing the twenty volumes of Grieg's Collected Works. He has edited books on Grieg's correspondence, and on Grieg's diaries. In 1990 he published a biographical book on composer Johan Svendsen, Johan Svendsen – mennesket og kunstneren (English: Johan Svendsen. The Man and the Artist), in cooperation with Schjelderup-Ebbe.

He was a fellow of the Norwegian Academy of Science and Letters from 1979, the Royal Danish Academy of Sciences and Letters from 1991 and Academia Europaea from 1992. He held honorary degrees as St. Olaf College from 1993 and Westfälische Wilhelms-Universität from 1996. He was decorated Knight, First Class of the Order of St. Olav in 1993.
