= 1916 in Norwegian music =

The following is a list of notable events and releases of the year 1916 in Norwegian music.

== Deaths ==
May

- 11 – Christian Cappelen, organist and composer (born 1845).

== Births ==
January

- 12 – Arne Sletsjøe, bratsjist in the Filharmonisk Selskaps orkester (died 1999).
- 22 – Arnljot Kjeldaas, composer and organist (died 1997).

June

- 27
  - Hallvard Johnsen, composer and flutist (died 2003).
  - Robert Normann, jazz guitarist (died 1998).

November

- 15 – Greta Gynt, singer, dancer and actress (died 2000).

December

- 19 – Ørnulf Gulbransen, flautist and music teacher (died 2004).

== See also ==
- 1916 in Norway
- Music of Norway
