= Frognerbadet =

Pool complex in the borough of Frogner in Oslo, Norway

Coordinates: 59.927203°N 10.706875°E

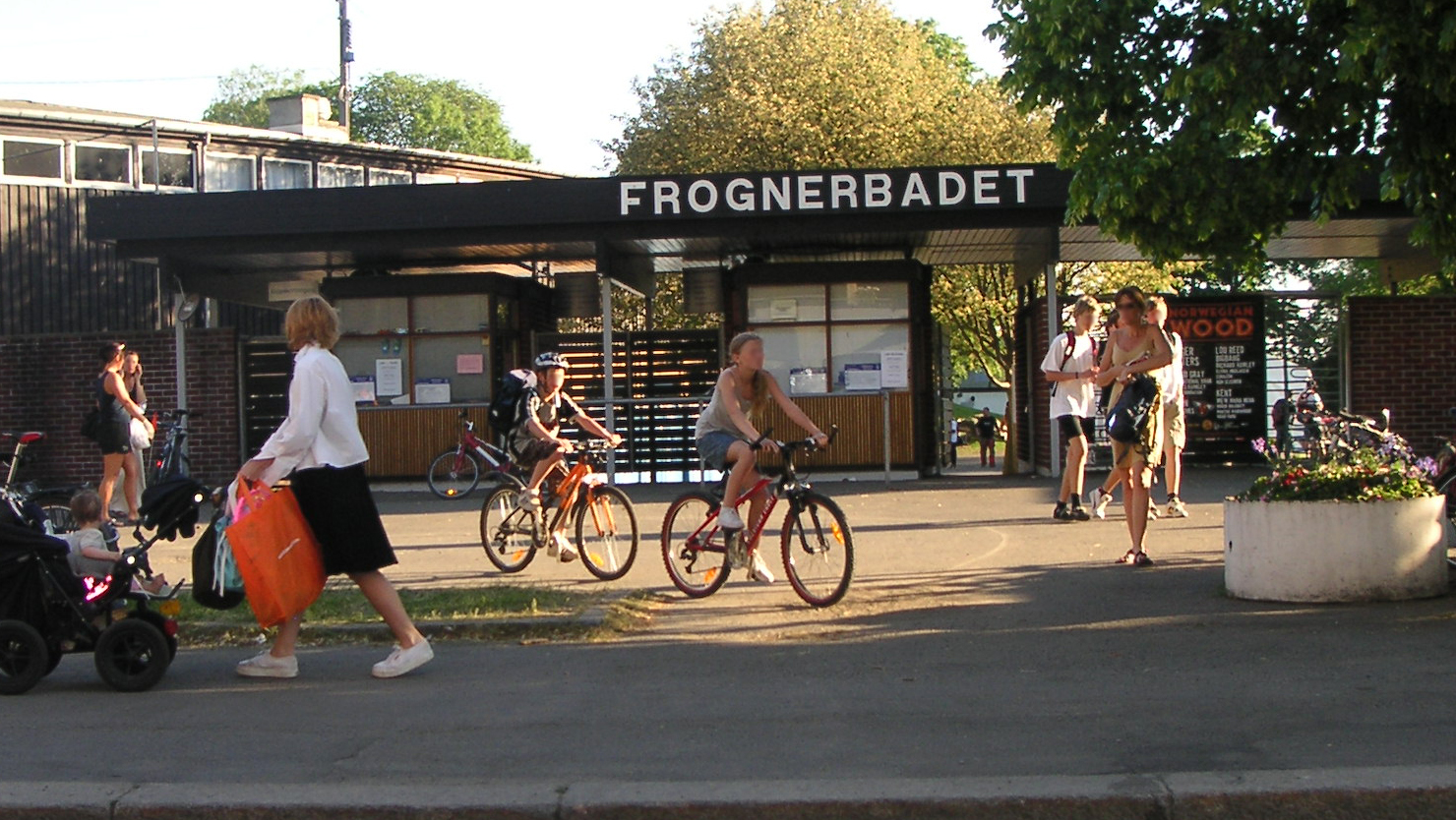
Entrance of Frognerbadet.

Frognerbadet ("the Frogner Baths") is a pool complex in the borough of Frogner in Oslo, Norway. It was designed by architect Frode Rinnan.

Located adjacent to Frognerparken, it opened in 1956, and doubles as a public bath and swimming pool and a professional swimming venue. The festival Norwegian Wood used to be hosted within its premises. It is also associated with the origins of death diving, and hosts the annual Døds Diving World Championship.

It has two 50-meter pools, one with 8 lanes for competitive swimming, and a diving pool with springboards and platforms at heights of 1, 3, 5, 7 and 10 meters.
