= Concerts Norway =

Norwegian music organization

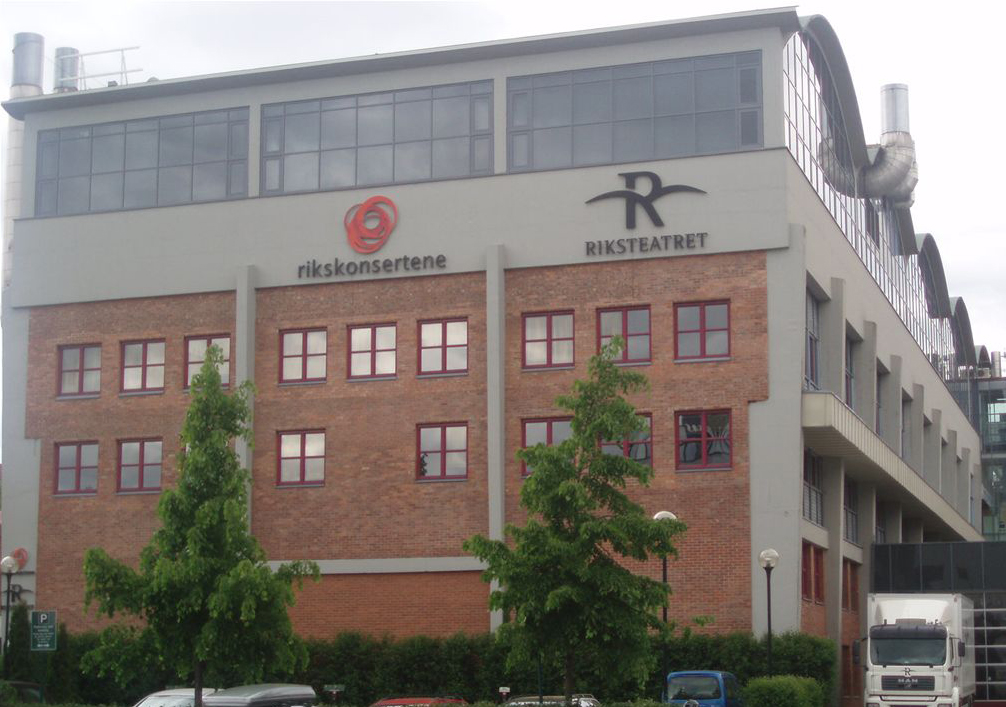
Concerts Norway and Riksteatret Building, Oslo

Concerts Norway (Norwegian: Rikskonsertene) was established in 1967 on the initiative of the Arts Council Norway (Norwegian: Norsk kulturråd), with its main purpose described as follows: "Concerts Norway is to make living music of high artistic quality accessible to all people in the country." The organization had its opening concert in Hammerfest school on 4 January 1968, with artists Liv Glaser, Eva Knardahl, Kjell Bækkelund, Robert Levin, Arve Tellefsen and Aase Nordmo Løvberg.

Concerts Norway is currently under the Norwegian Ministry of Culture and Church Affairs, and continues to have as its primary responsibility making a variety of music and culture available to the entire country, but in a greater variety of forms than originally. As of 2005 it annually engages more than 800 artists for more than 9000 concerts in all the country's 433 municipalities, which take place in schools, kindergartens, and work places. In recent years it has worked to promote new, young musicians in jazz, folk, and classical styles.

In May 2012, Concerts Norway's division of public concerts was dissolved, following a 2011 decision by the Ministry of Culture. The Oslo World Music Festival, which Concerts Norway founded in 1994, became a separate foundation at the same time.

The Director of Concerts Norway serves a six-year term; Einar Solbu served two terms as director, succeeded in 2006 by Åse Kleveland. On 16 April 2012, Turid Birkeland, like Kleveland a former Minister of Culture, became the latest Director. There are approximately 60 employees. Leif Holst Jensen is chairman of the board.
