= 1999 in Norwegian music =

The following is a list of notable events and releases of the year 1999 in Norwegian music.

== Events ==
=== January ===
- 29 – The 2nd Polarjazz started in Longyearbyen, Svalbard (February 29 – 31).

=== February ===
- 27 – The annual By:Larm festival started in Stavanger, Norway.

=== March ===
- 26 – The 26th Vossajazz started in Vossavangen, Norway (March 26 – 28).

=== April ===
- 28 – The Ole Blues festival started in Bergen (April 28 – May 2).

=== May ===
- 12 – The 10th MaiJazz started in Stavanger, Norway (May 12 – 16).
- 13 – The 27th Nattjazz started in Bergen, Norway (May 13 – 29).

=== June ===
- 26 – The 1st Øyafestivalen started at Kalvøya near by Oslo (June 26 – 27).
- 30 – The 35th Kongsberg Jazzfestival started in Kongsberg, Norway (June 30 – July 3).

=== July ===
- 12 – The 39th Moldejazz started in Molde, Norway (July 12 – 17).

=== August ===
- 9 – The 14th Oslo Jazzfestival started in Oslo, Norway (August 9 – 15).
- 11 – The 13th Sildajazz started in Haugesund, Norway (August 11 – 15).
- 12 – The 12th Notodden Blues Festival started in Notodden (August 12 – 15).

=== Unknown date ===
- The Core was initiated by drummer Espen Aalberg.

== Albums released ==
=== Unknown date ===
K

Karin Krog

- Bluesand (Meantime Records), with John Surman

== Deaths ==
February

- 16 – Johan Kvandal, composer (born 1919).

March

- 14 – Marius Müller, guitarist, singer, and songwriter, car crash (born 1958).
- 28 – Jens Book Jenssen, popular singer, songwriter, revue artist, and theatre director (born 1910).

April

- 27 – Gunnar Brunvoll, impresario and opera administrator (born 1924).

August

- 6 – Pernille Anker, actor and singer (born 1947).

December

- 30 – Gunnar Germeten Jr., composer (born 1947).

Unknown date

- Arne Sletsjøe, classical violist (born 1916).

== See also ==
- 1999 in Norway
- Music of Norway
- Norway in the Eurovision Song Contest 1999
- 1999 in jazz
