= Edvard Grieg – mennesket og kunstneren =

Book by Finn Benestad

- Author: Finn Benestad; Dag Schjelderup-Ebbe
- Language: Norwegian
- Genre: Biography; Music
- Publisher: Aschehoug
- Publication date: 1980
- Publication place: Norway
- English publication date: 1988
- Pages: 462 (2nd ed)

Edvard Grieg – mennesket og kunstneren (Edvard Grieg. The Man and the Artist) is a biography of Norwegian composer Edvard Grieg, written by Finn Benestad and Dag Schjelderup-Ebbe in 1980.

The book treats the life and works of Edvard Grieg, and includes a comprehensive list of Grieg's works with incipits.

== Edition history ==
The book earned Benestad and Schjelderup-Ebbe the Edvard Grieg Prize in 1981. The biography, originally written in Norwegian language, was translated into Russian in 1986 by Nicolay Mochov. An English edition, Edvard Grieg. The Man and the Artist, came in 1988, translated by William H. Halverson and Leland B. Sateren and published by University of Nebraska Press, Lincoln/London. A German edition was published in 1993. A second, revised edition was issued in 1990. Changes in the second edition include material based on a large collection of Grieg's manuscripts and letters rediscovered in New York City in 1984, saved from Nazi Germany in the 1930s.
