= Jostein Eriksen =

Norwegian opera singer

- Born: 7 July 1926; Våle Municipality, Norway
- Died: 16 December 2015 (aged 89)
- Occupation: Opera singer

Jostein Eriksen (7 July 1926 – 16 December 2015) was a Norwegian opera singer.

He was born in Våle Municipality. He studied at the Oslo Conservatory of Music and in Vienna, and made his concert debut in Oslo in 1956. He was appointed at the Norwegian National Opera and Ballet from 1958. He chaired the society Norsk Operasangerforbund from 1974 to 1979, and was also named an honorary member of the society.

Eriksen died on 16 December 2015, at the age of 89.
