= Thorleif Schjelderup-Ebbe =

Norwegian zoologist

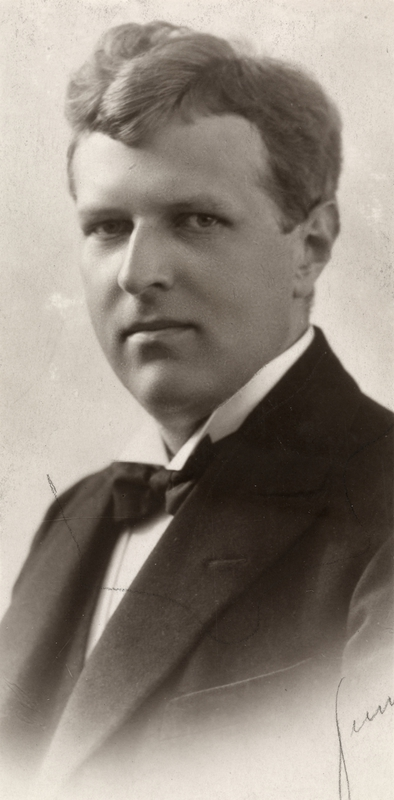
Portrait c. 1930 from the Oslo Museum

Thorleif Schjelderup-Ebbe (12 November 1894 in Kristiania – 8 June 1976 in Oslo) was a Norwegian zoologist and comparative psychologist. He was the first person to describe a pecking order of hens, a discovery that contributed to understanding dominance hierarchies across species and influenced the field of ethology.

== Biography and education ==
Thorleif Schjelderup-Ebbe was the son of the sculptors Axel Emil Ebbe (1868–1941) and Menga Schjelderup (1871–1945). He had a sheltered early life with tutors providing his education. From a young age, he showed wide-ranging interests and intellectual capabilities. By age six, he began observing chickens, recording their behaviours—an interest that would define his scientific career.

As a child, Schjelderup-Ebbe displayed linguistic abilities and scholarly aptitude. He learned multiple languages, including French, German, and English, and developed a memory for Latin nomenclature of animals and plants, as well as chemical formulas.

His formal education led him to study zoology at the University of Oslo, where he earned his degree in 1917. Following his studies in Norway, Schjelderup-Ebbe pursued further education in Germany, working with psychologist David Katz at the University of Leipzig. Though he completed his doctoral thesis in Germany, his academic journey included obstacles, particularly when attempting to advance his career in his native Norway.

== Scientific contributions ==
Schjelderup-Ebbe's main contribution to science came at the age of 19. In 1913, he published "The Voices of Chickens: A Contribution to the Psychology of Chickens", where he first described what would later become known as the "pecking order". His observations, conducted during summer holidays at his grandmother's farm, revealed that chickens established a social hierarchy determining which birds could peck others without retaliation.

This hierarchical organisation, Schjelderup-Ebbe noted, was not necessarily dependent on the strength or age of the hens, and sometimes formed complex structures including triangular dominance relationships. He documented how chickens recognised each other individually, remembered their relative status, and maintained these social structures across time.

Schjelderup-Ebbe's work extended beyond observation. He kept notebooks recording the laying patterns of hens and developed an understanding of hierarchical relationships among chickens. His concept of hackordnung (pecking order) became important to understanding social organisation in many species and contributed to the development of ethology (animal behaviour) as a scientific discipline.

Although "pecking order" is often thought of as a strictly linear hierarchy, Schjelderup-Ebbe actually reported that there could be cycles within dominance structures. This complexity has been somewhat lost as the concept entered common knowledge, with modern researchers noting that "even though Schjelderup-Ebbe reported that there could be cycles within the dominance structures, pecking orders have become archetypes of social rankings".

Throughout his career, Schjelderup-Ebbe published about 100 works. His research expanded to include studies on other bird species, insects, and the application of his hierarchical models to human societies. His 1922 paper Beitrage zur Sozialpsychologie des haushuhns ('Contributions to the Social Psychology of the Domestic Chicken') and his 1935 chapter on "Social Behaviour of Birds" in the Handbook of Social Psychology were among his published works.

In 1936, Schjelderup-Ebbe published a work on seed viability, suggesting seeds could survive for 2,000 to 3,000 years in pyramids. This research, published by the Norwegian Academy of Sciences, represented a departure from his animal behaviour studies but showed his diverse scientific interests.

== Academic career and challenges ==
Schjelderup-Ebbe's academic journey included challenges and resistance from the established scientific community. After completing his studies in Germany, he encountered opposition when attempting to secure academic positions in Norway. His doctoral thesis on the "Fragrance Intensity in Angiosperms" was initially rejected by the University of Oslo, with critics claiming it was "unscientific". Despite receiving responses from international scholars when he translated and distributed his research abroad, Norwegian academia remained largely closed to him. This rejection affected his academic aspirations.

Schjelderup-Ebbe eventually gained recognition internationally, corresponding with researchers in ethology including Konrad Lorenz, who acknowledged Schjelderup-Ebbe's work on dominance hierarchies. In 1955, he received correspondence from Lorenz, then a recognized authority on ethology, acknowledging the influence of Schjelderup-Ebbe's work on his own research.

Schjelderup-Ebbe achieved some recognition in Norway and was regarded in scientific circles abroad. His work on chickens was referenced in textbooks of psychology in Norway. In 1956, he received an honorary Doctorate of Science from the University of Copenhagen.

== Personal life ==
Schjelderup-Ebbe was married to Torbjørg Brekke. The couple had one son, Dag Schjelderup-Ebbe, who became a musicologist, composer, music critic and biographer.

According to accounts from his son, Thorleif possessed a complex personality. He was described as egotistical and self-centred, yet also diligent, optimistic, and intellectually wide-ranging. Despite facing professional disappointments, he maintained productivity, working in diverse fields including botany and poetry.

Thorleif had interests beyond his scientific work. He wrote children's stories and poetry, and had ability in languages. While he showed observational skills and scientific approach in his professional work, he had little musical aptitude—a trait his son noted, particularly as Thorleif's family included many musicians.

== Legacy ==
Schjelderup-Ebbe's concept of the "pecking order" has expanded beyond its origins in chicken behaviour to become a principle in understanding social hierarchies across species, including humans. His work contributed to the study of dominance relationships and social organisation in the fields of ethology, comparative psychology, and behavioural sciences.

Though initially less recognized, particularly in his homeland, Schjelderup-Ebbe's contributions have gained appreciation over time. His observational methods and insights into animal behaviour helped develop ethology as a scientific discipline. The term "pecking order" has entered common language as a metaphor for social hierarchies in various contexts.

The concept of pecking orders has become particularly influential in complex systems science, where it represents a key example of how rankings and hierarchies function in nature. Schjelderup-Ebbe's work continues to be cited in modern research on dominance structures, ranking dynamics, and universal patterns in hierarchical systems.

== Selected publications ==
- Schjelderup-Ebbe, T. (1935). "Social behavior of birds". A Handbook of Social Psychology. Clark University Press. pp. 947–972.
- Schjelderup-Ebbe, Thorleif (1957). "Life, Reactions, and Sociology in a Number of Insects". The Journal of Social Psychology. 46 (2): 287–292. doi:10.1080/00224545.1957.9714328.
