= Døds diving =

Amateur diving sport

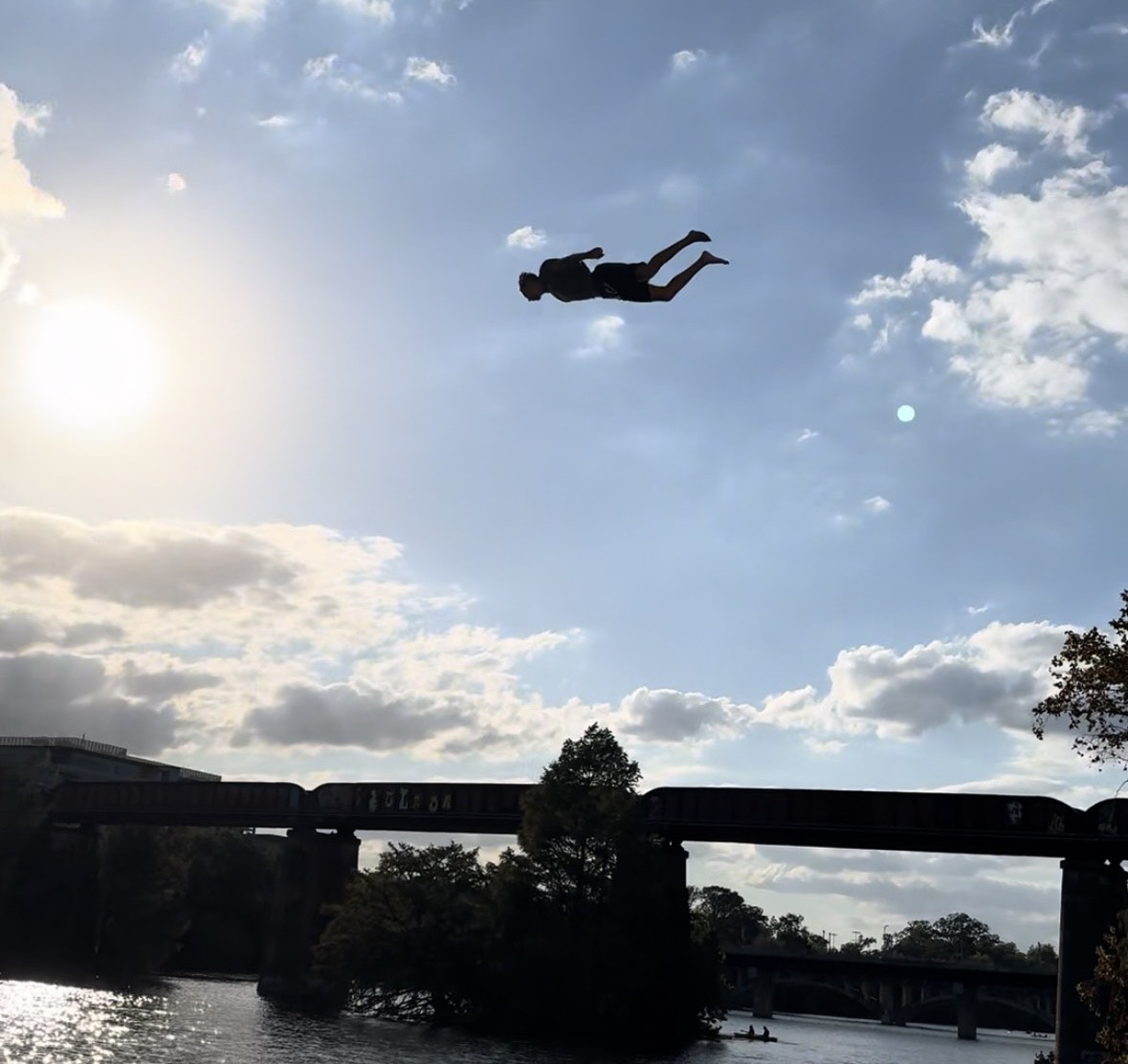
Death diving

Døds diving or dødsing, also known as death diving, is an extreme sport originating in Norway. In this amateur sport, divers jump from high platforms in a horizontal position before curling into a pike position (similar to a fetal position) just before entering the water, landing first with their feet and hands or knees and elbows to avoid serious injury. Unlike traditional diving, the goal is not to minimize splash or perfect form but to maintain a dramatic pose for as long as possible mid-air. Despite being risky, death diving has experienced athletes who have developed techniques to manage impact and prevent injury.

== Competitions ==
Døds is produced and promoted by the International Døds Federation through its Døds Diving League consisting of Døds Diving World Tour, Døds Diving World Championship and other proprietary events. The Døds Diving World Tour is the official competition circuit that serves as a qualifier for the Døds Diving World Championship. The Døds Diving World Championship is the pinnacle event of the sport of death diving, and has taken place in Oslo, Norway every August since it debuted in 2008 as the first official death diving competition on the global stage. Under its Døds trademarks, the International Døds Federation produces everything from events, media productions, merchandise and training courses at Døds Academy. International Døds Federation, headquartered in Oslo, Norway, is a fully commercial organization that works to build the sport and the death diving community internationally.

== Competition Format ==
Døds Diving competitions are divided into two main categories:

- Classic Døds – Divers maintain a stretched, rigid position with arms and legs extended throughout the jump.
- Freestyle Døds – Divers perform flips, spins, or other creative movements before impact.

Competitors are judged based on several criteria, including:

- The height and distance of the jump
- The control and style of the dive
- The duration of the aerial position before tucking
- The overall execution, including the splash upon entry

== History ==
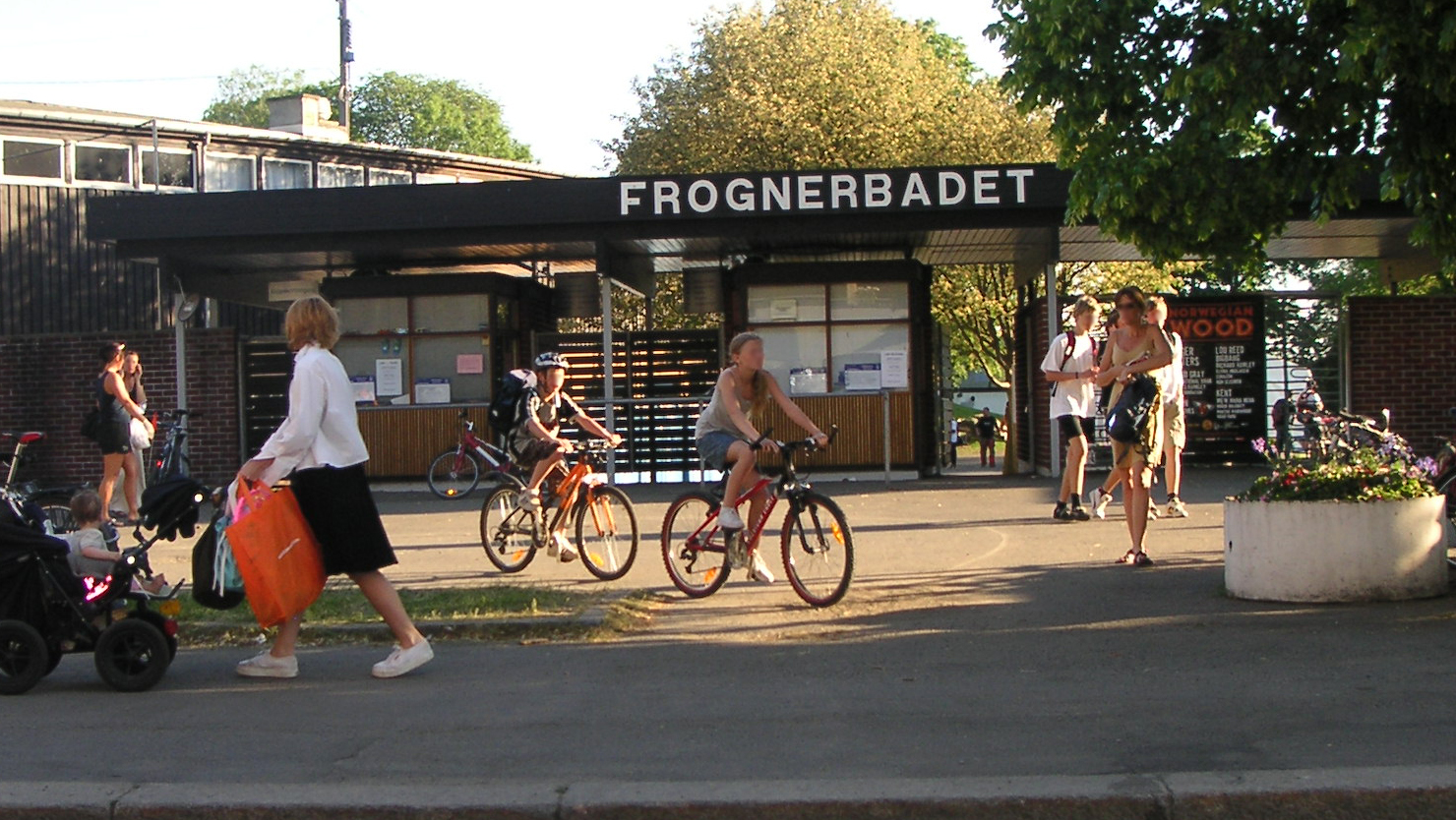
Frognerbadet, a public bath in Oslo, Norway.

"Døds Diving" has roots as a distinctive style of diving at Frognerbadet ("the Frogner Baths") pool complex since the 1980s, where youths from the different districts of Oslo competed in performing the toughest stunts from the 10-meter. Døds is said to have been started in the summer of 1982 and was pioneered by Erling Bruno Hovden, then guitar player in Raga Rockers.

Each year since its launch in 2012, the Bruno Award is given to the best classic døds or to honour an extraordinary performance or achievement (winners below) to honour his memory. Since 2008, the Døds Diving World Championship (Norwegian: VM i Døds) has been held annually competition at Frognerbadet. In recent years the capacity has been filled with 6,000 spectators and tickets being sold out. The events have been broadcast nationally (TV2, TV2 Sport, Viasat) and internationally (ESPN).

At the Døds World Championship 2024, Pacome Pegaz from Spain won the men's title and became the first ever non-Norwegian diver to win confirming the sports increasing international growth.

The current world record in height is 48.7 meters and is held by German diver Flyingfloou. In the women's class, the record is at 34.8 meters and is held by Georgette.

The current world record in freestyle death diving is held by Swiss diver Lucien Charlon with a height of 41.7 meters.

== Døds World Championship winners (Men) ==
- 2008 — Christian Kjellmann
- 2009 — Fredrik Amundsen
- 2010 — Vladimir Jevtic
- 2011 — Thord Samuelsen
- 2012 — Henning Marthinsen
- 2013 — Filip Julius Devor
- 2014 — Filip Julius Devor
- 2015 — Filip Julius Devor
- 2016 — Truls Torp
- 2017 — Truls Torp
- 2018 — Emil Lybekk
- 2019 — Kim André Knutsen
- 2020 — Emil Lybekk
- 2021 — Kim André Knutsen
- 2022 — Leo Landrø
- 2023 — Truls Torp
- 2024 — Pacome Pegaz
- 2025 — Jørgen Borgly

== Bruno Award winners ==
- 2012 — Jeppe Skageng
- 2013 — Per Kristen Andenæs
- 2014 — Morten Falteng
- 2015 — Simon B. Aaland
- 2016 — Simon B. Aaland
- 2017 — Håkon Høyem
- 2018 — Petter Andresen
- 2019 — Leo Landrø
- 2020 — Filip Julius Devor
- 2021 — Aleksander Frostad
- 2022 — Asbjørg Nesje
- 2023 — Jørgen Borgly
- 2024 —"Simenfisk" Simen Mathisen
- 2025 — Jørgen Borgly

== World Championship winners (Women) ==
- 2014 — Hedda Berntsen
- 2018 — Miriam Hamberg
- 2019 — Miriam Hamberg
- 2020 — Ingrid Eriksen Bru
- 2021 — Asbjørg Nesje
- 2022 — Asbjørg Nesje
- 2023 — Asbjørg Nesje
- 2024 — Line Galaasen Lund
- 2025 — Asbjørg Nesje
