= Kaare Ørnung =

- Born: Kaare Alexander Ørnung; 26 January 1931; Oslo, Norway
- Died: 2 October 2013 (aged 82) Oslo, Norway
- Genres: Classical
- Occupations: Pianist, music teacher
- Instrument: Piano
- Years active: 1952–2013

Kaare Alexander Ørnung (26 January 1931 – 2 October 2013) was a Norwegian pianist and music teacher.

== Biography ==
Ørnung was born on 26 January 1931 in Oslo.

He made his debut in 1952, worked at the Veitvet Music Academy between 1959 and 1973, and at the Opera College in 1968. From 1973, he was a lecturer at the Norwegian Academy, then associate professor from 1974.

He met Arve Tellefsen in the 1960s and the two had a co-operation that lasted 25 years. They also performed with Knutsen & Ludvigsen. He recorded Du milde Mosart (1977) with Tellefsen and Knutsen & Ludvigsen and Serenade (1980) with Tellefsen. The latter stayed for 12 weeks on the VG-list in 1980 and 1981. He is especially remembered for the song "Spæll på fiolin" from Du Milde Mozart where he sang a recurring strofe.

Ørnung also played in many concerts organized by Rikskonsertene. He often performed in radio and television programmes.

Ørnung died on 2 October 2013, aged 82, in Oslo.
