= Dag Schjelderup-Ebbe =

Norwegian musicologist, music critic and biographer (1926–2013)

- Born: 10 December 1926; Oslo, Norway
- Died: 1 February 2013 (aged 86)
- Education: University of California, Berkeley
- Occupations: Musicologist; composer; music critic; biographer; professor at the University of Oslo
- Notable work: Edvard Grieg – mennesket og kunstneren (1980)
- Father: Thorleif Schjelderup-Ebbe
- Awards: Order of St. Olav (2001)

Dag Schjelderup-Ebbe (10 December 1926 – 1 February 2013) was a Norwegian musicologist, composer, music critic and biographer. He was a lecturer at the University of Oslo for thirty years, from 1973 with the title of professor. His research mainly centered on the Norwegian composer Edvard Grieg.

== Life and career ==
Schjelderup-Ebbe was born in Oslo as the son of zoologist Thorleif Schjelderup-Ebbe and Torbjørg Brekke.

He graduated in musicology from the University of California, Berkeley in 1950, and started teaching at the University of Oslo the same year. In 1953 he published the work A Study of Grieg's Harmony, and in 1964 the work Edvard Grieg 1858–1867, which was also the basis for his doctorate thesis. In addition to his university assignment he also worked as a music critic for the newspaper Vårt Land from 1957 to 1963, and for Verdens Gang from 1963 to 1973. He was appointed professor at the University of Oslo from 1973 to 1980. He co-wrote the biography Edvard Grieg – mennesket og kunstneren in 1980, together with Finn Benestad. This book was translated into English in 1988 (English title Edvard Grieg. The Man and the Artist). It has also been translated into German and Russian language.

From 1970 to 1980 he chaired the committee responsible for the twenty volumes of Grieg's Collected Works (German: Edvard Grieg Gesamtausgabe), and also edited the first four volumes of the series, which covered Grieg's piano concertos. In 1990 Schjelderup-Ebbe co-wrote a biographical book on composer Johan Svendsen, Johan Svendsen – mennesket og kunstneren (English: Johan Svendsen - The Man and the Artist). Schjelderup-Ebbe's compositions include several pieces for piano, orchestral works and song.

He was a fellow of the Norwegian Academy of Science and Letters from 1990, received honorary degrees at St. Olaf College in 1993 and the University of Münster in 1994. He was decorated Knight, First Class of the Order of St. Olav in 2001. He died in February 2013.
