= Accidents Never Happen =

Norwegian rock band

Accidents Never Happen (ANH) is a rock band from Oslo, Norway, formed in 2005. After releasing their debut album Oslo Beat in 2006, vocalist and main songwriter Magne Mostue, guitarist Martin Natvig, drummer Christian Løvhaug and guitarist Jesper Jørgensen moved to Liverpool, UK. The band's music was influenced significantly by their two-year stay in the UK. Their second project, Accidents Never Happen, was recorded in The Motor Museum and St Brides church; (The band's rehearsal space) with Simon Cullwick (who allegedly turned down an offer to work on Razorlight's Slipway Fires). "Accidents Never Happen" was a much darker album than Oslo Beat.

Internal differences came to a head by the end of 2008 when the band, despite widespread support, decided to head back to Norway. The following week, Zane Lowe on BBC Radio 1 played an album outtake called "New Year".

An NME live review raved about the band's passionate live performance in their edition of the magazine dated 3 December 2008 (only in the magazine, not on the web): "these ain't in this to be tagged masters of the underground. That's an Accident".

Accidents Never Happen was released in May 2009 on Deadletter records, and was named the sixth-best Norwegian album of the year by Harald Fossberg of Aftenposten. The band played their last show before going on hiatus at Parkteateret in Oslo on 28 August 2009. The members have since then been in bands such as Team Me, Heyerdahl and Spielbergs.

During its tenure, the band played with acts such as Die! Die! Die!, The Wombats, Asobi Seksu, Caribou, Wave Machines, William, Yeasayer, Johnny Foreigner and The Mae Shi, and played at festivals such as The Great Escape festival, Liverpool Music Week, Liverpool Sound City, Manchester Sound City, Øya festivalen, Storås festivalen, Slottsfjell festivalen, Phonofestivalen and Pstereofestivalen. Accidents Never Happen played their last show in Oslo fall 2009.

April 2023 the band entered the same room and jamed for the first time since 2009.

== Discography ==
- no:Oslo Beat ''Oslo Beat'' (2006)
- Accidents Never Happen (2009)
