= Arne J. Solhaug =

Norwegian professor and cantor

Arne Johnson Solhaug (born 25 September 1942 in Østre Toten Municipality, Norway) is assistant professor at Norges Musikkhøgskole, cantor of Grønland Church in Oslo, author, and composer.

== Compositions (selected) ==
- Lat oss prise Gud, vår Fader (NoS 282) (1979)
- For Guds folk er hvilen tilbake : for blandet kor : SATB (2004)
- Jeg åpner din kimono : for blandet kor : SATB (2004)
- For Guds folk er hvilen tilbake : for blandet kor : SATB (2004)
- Jesus Kristus ble lydig til døden : motett for Palmesøndag : for blandet kor SATB (2005)
- Kyrie : liturgisk salme for blandet kor : SATB (2006)

== Bibliography ==
- Fra organist til kantor : utviklingen av en ny kirkemusikeridentitet – (2002)
- Et luthersk graduale-håndskrift fra 1500-tallet : spor av Nidarostradisjon i Island – (2003)
