= Bjørg Lødøen =

Norwegian artist (1931–2009)

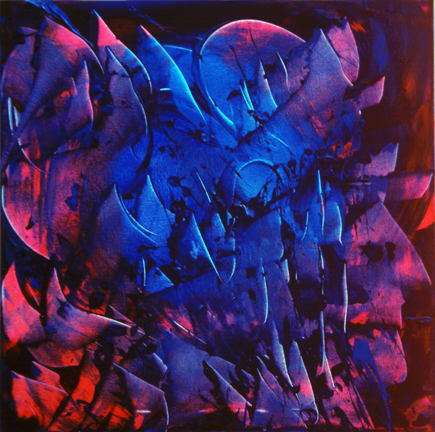
Ritual Dance, Acrylic painting, 81x81cm by Bjørg Lødøen, 2002.

Bjørg Lødøen (7 December 1931 – 5 March 2009) was a Norwegian painter, graphic artist, and composer.

== Biography ==
Lødøen was born in Oslo, Norway. In 1945, by way of her father she came to know the painter Xan Krohn. Krohn had been taking part in the Russian avant-garde movement from about 1910 until he returned to Norway some time after 1917. Krohn was affiliated with a group of artists, Jack of Diamonds, that included Kazimir Malevich, Mikhail Larionov and Natalia Goncharova.

From 1951 until 1954 Lødøen was studying at the Norwegian National Academy of Craft and Art Industry in Oslo, from 1957 until 1961 at the Norwegian National Academy of Fine Arts, with the professor Alexander Schultz. Whilst a student she spent some time in Paris and Florence, from 1961 she made several study trips throughout Europe. Lødøen is also known for her cooperative work with Rolf Aamot for cinema and television. Her work is on display in several Norwegian and European museums, and can also be found in the U.S. She was awarded the State Life Grant for Artists in 1977.

== Selected works ==
=== Exhibitions ===
- Kunstnerforbundet ("The Artistsociety"), Oslo 1961, paintings and drawings.
- Oslo Kunstforening (Oslo Art Society), Oslo 1966, paintings.
- Kunstnernes Hus ("Artists´ House") - Permanenten, Oslo 1973, permanent exhibition-paintings.
- Porsgrunn Art Society , 1973, paintings.
- Kunstnernes Hus, Oslo 1976, paintings - visual music, in correlation to Rolf Aamot's exhibit.
- Bergen Kunsthall (Bergen Art Society), 1994, laser exhibition in correlation to Rolf Aamot's exhibit.
- Gallery Bjerke, Oslo 1996.
- Oslo City Hall Gallery, (Large scale paintings), 1999.
- Kongsvinger Art Society , 1999, paintings and large watercolors.
- Svor Museum, Hornindal Municipality, Nordfjord, 2000, large watercolors and paintings.

=== Paintings and watercolor ===
- Sunflowers in Eclipse (1999)

=== Television ===
- "Visual" (1971); Music by Rolf Aamot. Recorded and produced by Bjørg Lødøen and Rolf Aamot.t.
- "Progress" (1977); Music by Rolf Aamot. Recorded and produced by Bjørg Lødøen and Rolf Aamot.
- "Puls" (1986), 3. part; Music by Rolf Aamot. Recorded and produced by Bjørg Lødøen and Rolf Aamot.
- "Medusa" (1986), a composition by Bjørg Lødøen and Rolf Aamot; in which Lødøen is a visual actor.

=== Cinema ===
- "Kinetic Energy" (1967–68), Music by Rolf Aamot. Recorded and produced by Bjørg Lødøen and Rolf Aamot.
- "Vision - en film om Gustav Vigeland" (1969); Music by Rolf Aamot. Recorded and produced by Bjørg Lødøen and Rolf Aamot.
- "Structures" (1970); music: Rolf Aamot, Music by Rolf Aamot. Recorded and produced by Bjørg Lødøen and Rolf Aamot.
- "Actio" (1980); Music by Rolf Aamot. Recorded and produced by Bjørg Lødøen and Rolf Aamot..

== Literature ==
- Norsk Kunstnerleksikon, Bind 2 (Norwegian Artist Encyclopedia, Vol. 2), Universitetsforlaget, Oslo.
