= Nordlysfestivalen =

Norwegian music festival

The Northern Lights Music Festival Nordlysfestivalen
- Status: Active
- Genre: Music Festival
- Date: January - February
- Begins: 29 January 2026
- Ends: 7 February 2026
- Frequency: Annually
- Location: Tromsø
- Country: Norway
- Years active: 1988 - present
- Inaugurated: Founded 1987
- Website: www.nordlysfestivalen.no

The Northern Lights Music Festival or Nordlysfestivalen (established 1987 in Tromsø, Norway) is a Norwegian music festival, held in January–February. In 2012 The Northern Lights Festival celebrated their 25th anniversary.

== Biography ==
Since the start in 1988 the festival has expended to more than 500 concerts and other shows, more than 1000 volunteers have shared their time and effort to gain the festival and countless artists and musicians from all over the world, have visited Nordlysfestivalen, and the city of Tromsø has been submerged in a musical extravaganza the last week of January. The Northern Lights Festival has each year presented top artists in genres ranging from early music to modern, from opera to jazz, from chamber music to symphonic orchestras. The list of top artists that have visited the festival range over Norwegian musicians like Leif Ove Andsnes, Jan Garbarek and Mari Boine and international star performers like Martin Fröst, Yuri Bashmet and Dee Dee Bridgewater. Ensembles like Il Giardino Armonico and The Hilliard Ensemble, The Mariinsky Opera and Ballet, the symphony orchestras from Gothenburg, St. Petersburg and Oslo, are all on the list of festival participants. The festival program have had an interesting mixture of top quality performances which also includes many artists from the Northern Norway.

In addition, the festival has outdoor events, lectures, exhibitions and other events like the Northern Lights cruise, festival pubs and masterclasses for musicians. An annual award is presented by the newspaper Nordlys in Tromsø to "enhance the music life in Northern Norway".
