= Tromsø Jazz Festival =

Music festival in Tromsø, Norway

Tromsø Jazz Festival Tromsø Jazzfestival
- Status: Active
- Genre: Jazz Festival
- Date: August
- Begins: 9 August 2018
- Ends: 12 August 2018
- Frequency: Annually
- Location: Tromsø
- Country: Norway
- Years active: 2006 - present
- Inaugurated: Founded 2006
- Website: www.tromsojazzfestival.no/home

Tromsø Jazz Festival (initiated 2006 in Tromsø, Norway under the name Barents Jazz) started out as an annual winter festival, but was transformed to an annual summer festival in 2016.

== Biography ==
The festival was arranged for the first time in 2016 (August 11 – 14). The inaugural Barentsjazz or The Tromsø International Jazz Festival was held in 2006. The festival was held 9 years running under this name in early winter as the Polar Night cast Northern Norway into darkness. The 10th and final edition of Barentsjazz took place in 2015 (November 25 – 29).

From its inception, the festival has received financial support from the Tromsø Municipal Council, Troms County Council and Arts Council Norway. The change from winter festival to summer festival, including the associated concept and name changes, has been made possible by a two-year grant from the Troms County Council Business Development Fund. The festival was founded by Eirik Bræin Gikling in 2006, and the festivals director has been Ola Asdahl Rokkones since 2011. Among famous artists who have played on the Barents Jazz is Karin Krog, Bugge Wesseltoft, Beady Belle, Ragnhild Furebotten, Håkon Kornstad, Geir Lysne and Dave Weckl among others. In 2018 Jan Garbarek is headliner.

== Festival directors ==
- 2006–2008: Eirik Bræin Gikling
- 2008–2011: Torbjørn Lunde Ingvaldsen
- 2011–present: Ola Asdahl Rokkones
