= Aase Nordmo Løvberg =

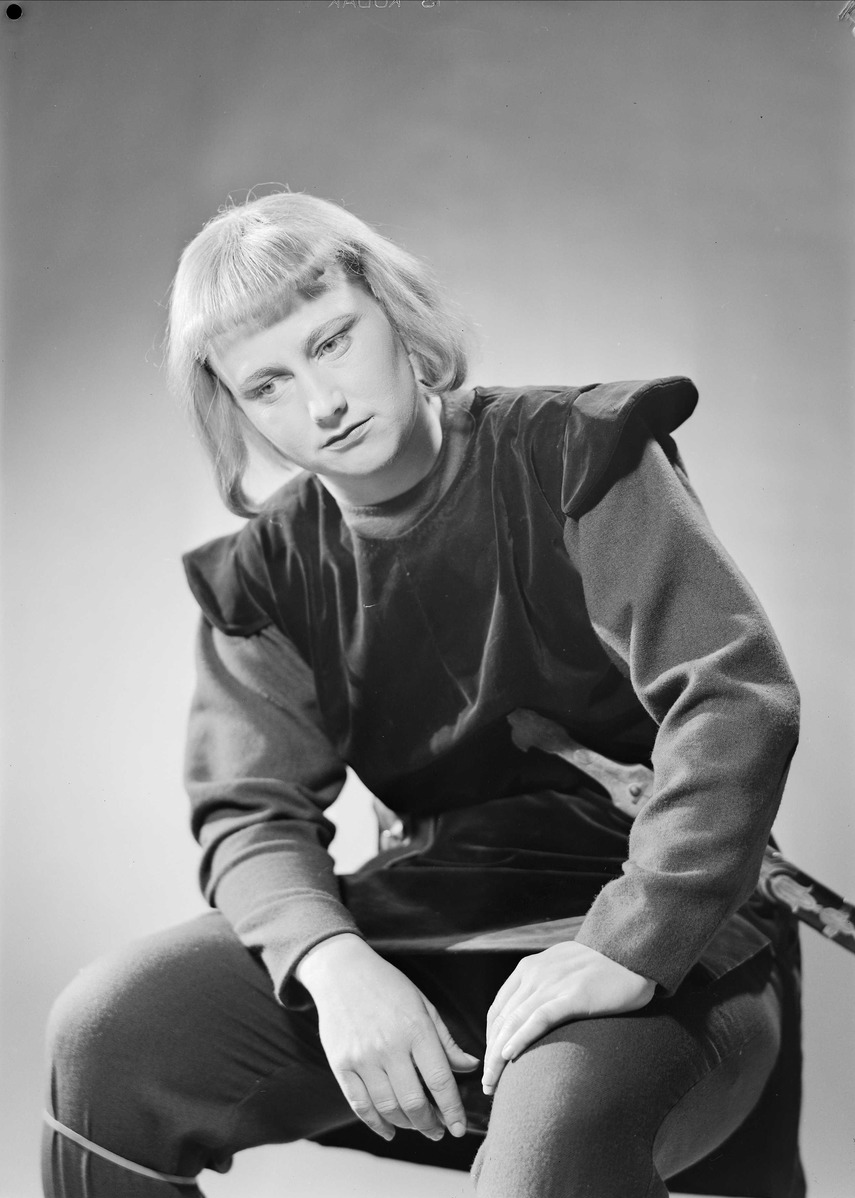

Background information
- Born: 10 June 1923; Målselv, Troms, Norway
- Died: 25 January 2013 (aged 89); Lillehammer, Oppland, Norway
- Occupation: Opera singer

Aase Nordmo Løvberg (10 June 1923 – 25 January 2013) was a Norwegian opera singer. Dagbladet called her "one of Norway's greatest opera singers." For many years she sang with Jussi Björling, and she also sang under renowned conductors such as Herbert von Karajan.

== Life ==
Løvberg was born in Målselv Municipality, Troms, in 1923. Her family were farmers.

Løvberg was married twice: to Gunnar Eilert Løvberg in 1947 and to Børt-Erik Thoresen in 1976.

== Career ==
Løvberg made her professional début in Oslo in 1948 at the University of Oslo.

She sang at the Concert Hall in Stockholm during the 1952 Olympics. That year, she moved to Stockholm, where she would live until the 1970. Jussi Björling and Birgit Nilsson were two of the singers with whom she regularly performed. In 1957, Herbert von Karajan asked Løvberg to perform at the Vienna State Opera. She accepted, making her international debut as Sieglinde in Die Walküre. That year, she was appointed a knight of the first class for the Order of St. Olav.

Løvberg performed at the Metropolitan Opera and the Covent Garden Opera.

She became Norway's first professor of singing when the Norwegian Academy of Music opened in 1973. She was director of the Norwegian Opera starting in 1978.

== Later life and legacy ==
In 1981, she retired from her position as director of the Opera. That year, she was also named a commander of the Order of St. Olav.

Løvberg lived her last years in Lillehammer Municipality in Oppland county, where she died aged 89.

She is also a member of the Order of the Polar Star.
