= Oslo World Music Festival =

Annual music festival in Oslo, Norway

Oslo World Music Festival (established in 1994 by the name Verden i Norden in Oslo, Norway) is an annual festival presenting music from all over the world, with a primary focus on Asia, Africa and Latin America.

== History ==
The festival started as a collaboration between the Nordic countries. As the other countries pulled out, and the festival in Oslo increased, the festival changed to its current name in 2002. The festival was formerly part of Rikskonsertene, but became an independent foundation in January 2012. The aim has constantly been to create an interest and understanding for the values that are inherent in the cultural expressions of others.

Each year, artists from almost every corner of the world are present, and many well-known musicians have visited Oslo for the very first time as a result of the festival. In recent years, the festival has focused on presenting music from great cities all over the world, with the ambition of reaching a broad, music-loving, curious public. The flamenco guitarist Paco de Lucia performed a concert in 2006.

During the 2012 festival, more than 300 artists from all around the world performed on 14 different venues in Oslo in a variety of genres including Chaabi, African jazz, samba, French chanson, electronica and hip hop.

With the 2013 festival, the 20th anniversary was celebrated, presenting artists from all over the world performing music like flamenco, Nigerian soul, fado, electronica, hip hop and dessert blues, on 18 different venues all over Oslo.

== Commissioned works ==
- 2002: "Lille Alhambra", composed by Paolo Vinaccia and Audun Erlien, for five poets, three musicians and electronics
- 2013: "OK World", composed by Bugge Wesseltoft, for a global music ensemble
