= Norwegian Wood (music festival) =

Annual music festival in Oslo, Norway

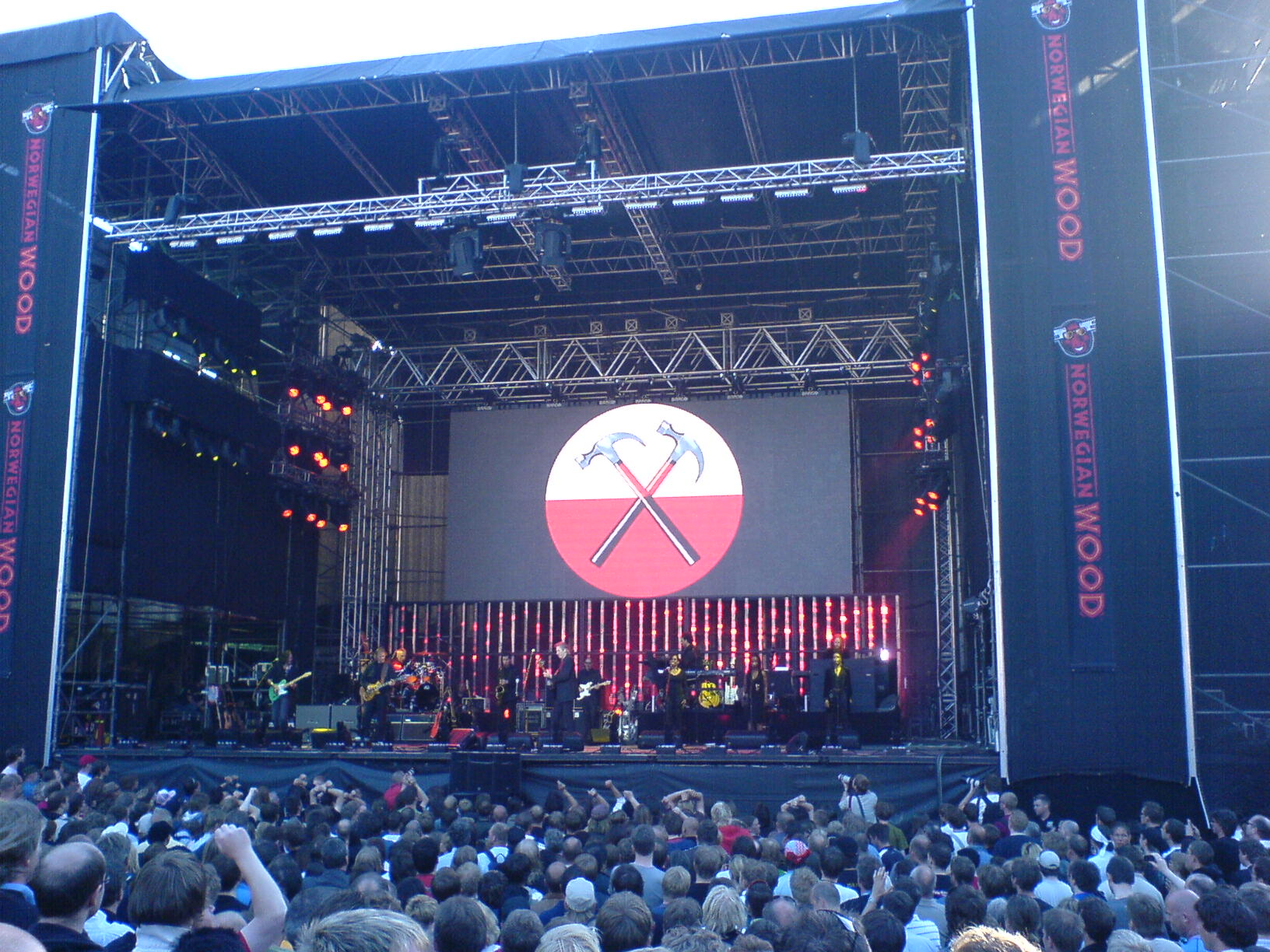
- Roger Waters performing at Norwegian Wood in 2006
- Status: defunct
- Genre: Music Festival
- Date: June
- Frequency: Annually
- Location: Oslo
- Country: Norway
- Years active: 1992–2017
- Capacity: 9,000

Norwegian Wood was an annual music festival in Oslo, Norway, held in Frognerbadet. The name of the festival refers to the Beatles song "Norwegian Wood (This Bird Has Flown)".

== History ==
Norwegian Wood was initiated in 1992 by Jørgen Roll, Sten Fredriksen and Haakon Hartvedt. The first two festivals were held on Bærums Verk in Bærum, but the festival was moved to Frognerbadet in 1994. Notable artists who have appeared on the festival include Johnny Cash, Jethro Tull, Van Morrison, Savoy, Bo Kaspers Orkester, Bob Dylan, Brian Wilson, the Kinks, Tom Petty and the Heartbreakers, David Bowie, Lou Reed, Jaga Jazzist, Madrugada, Suede, Faithless, Wilco, James Taylor, Sting, Linkin Park, Audioslave, the Dandy Warhols and Counting Crows. The number of tickets sold for the festival numbered 8,000 in 2009.

2017 was the final year Norwegian Wood took place. The responsible company behind the festival declared bankruptcy in autumn of that year, and later attempts to revive it has proven unsuccessful.

== Notable performances ==
- (1992) - Johnny Cash
- (1994) - Jethro Tull, John Trudell
- (1995) - Van Morrison, Bo Kaspers Orkester
- (1996) - Savoy, Emmylou Harris, The Kinks, Gin Blossoms, Grant Lee Buffalo, Iggy Pop
- (1997) - Simple Minds, Loudon Wainwright III
- (1998) - Van Morrison, Lisa Loeb, Lou Reed, Bob Dylan
- (1999) - Neil Finn, Suede, Taxi, Wilco, BigBang, Bertine Zetlitz Faithless, James Taylor
- (2000) - Röyksopp, Kaizers Orchestra, Van Morrison, Morten Abel, Lynyrd Skynyrd, Bryan Ferry, BigBang, Jaga Jazzist
- (2001) - Madrugada, Ulf Lundell, Sting, Tom McRae
- (2002) - Gluecifer, Iggy Pop, Jaga Jazzist, Suzanne Vega, Faithless, Sahara Hotnights
- (2003) - Tom McRae, The Dandy Warhols, The Hellacopters, DumDum Boys, Gåte, Kaizers Orchestra, Audioslave, Counting Crows
- (2004) - The Cardigans, Wilco, Ash, David Bowie
- (2005) - The Hives, Thom Hell, deLillos, System of a Down, Tori Amos
- (2006) - Roger Waters, Kent, Mew, Maria Mena, Turbonegro, Deftones, Soulfly, Richard Hawley
- (2007) - Tori Amos, Wolfmother, Evanescence, Korn, Travis, Brian Wilson
- (2008) - Alanis Morissette, Dinosaur Jr, Queens of the Stone Age, Foo Fighters, Jimmy Eat World, Billy Talent, Paramore, Rufus Wainwright
- (2009) - Neil Young, Nick Cave and the Bad Seeds, The Pretenders, Duffy, Keane
- (2010) - Roger Hodgson, Van Morrison, Mark Knopfler
- (2011) - Patti Smith, Eric Clapton, Ringo Starr & His All-Starr Band, Eagles
- (2012) - Bryan Ferry, Lenny Kravitz, Tom Petty and the Heartbreakers, Gaslight Anthem, Sting, James Morrison
- (2013) - Keane, Rod Stewart, Nick Cave and the Bad Seeds, Band of Horses, Noah and the Whale
- (2014) - John Mayer, Arcade Fire, Kent, White Lies, Ane Brun, Violet Road, James Vincent McMorrow
