= 1881 in Nordic music =

The following is a list of notable events that occurred in the year 1881 in Nordic music.

== Events ==
- 16 October – Andreas Hallén's groundbreaking opera Harald Viking, dedicated to his home town of Gothenburg, is premièred in Leipzig, Germany.
- 30 October
  - The wedding cantata composed by Johan Svendsen to celebrate the wedding of future king Gustaf V of Sweden and Princess Victoria of Baden (which took place on 20 September) is premiered in Kristiania, Norway.
  - Polish violin virtuoso Stanisław Barcewicz premières Svendsen's Romanse with the composer conducting.
- unknown date
  - Edvard Grieg writes to Aimar Grønvold: "I must admit, unlike Svendsen, that I left Leipzig Conservatory just as stupid as I entered it. Naturally, I did learn something there, but my individuality was still a closed book to me."
  - Student Jean Sibelius transcribes a short pizzicato piece, Vattendroppar (Water Drops), for violin, probably a musical exercise; the manuscript survives.

== New works ==
- Niels Gade – Nye Akvareller
- Edvard Grieg – Norske danser, Op.35
- Andreas Hallén – Harald Viking (opera)
- Robert Kajanus – Suomalainen rapsodia (Finnish rhapsody) No. 1 in D minor, Op. 5
- Peter Lange-Müller – Fulvia, Op. 15
- Jean Sibelius – Water Droplets
- Johan Svendsen – Violin Romance, Op. 26

== Births ==
- 13 January – Sigvaldi Kaldalóns, Icelandic composer (died 1946)
- 7 May – Edvard Sylou-Creutz, Norwegian classical pianist, composer and radio personality (died 1945).
- 6 July – Nancy Dalberg, Danish composer (died 1949)
- 27 August – Sigurd Islandsmoen, Norwegian composer and painter (died 1964).
- 28 August – Arne Eggen, Norwegian composer and organist (died 1955).
- 29 August – Edvin Kallstenius, Swedish composer (died 1967)
- 25 November – Peder Gram, Danish organist and composer (died 1956)
- 27 December – Viktor Widqvist, Swedish military musician and composer (died 1952)

== Deaths ==
- 24 September – Petrine Fredstrup, ballet dancer and teacher (born 1827)

== See also ==
- 1881 in Denmark
- 1881 in Norwegian music
- 1881 in Sweden
