= 2018 in Norwegian music =

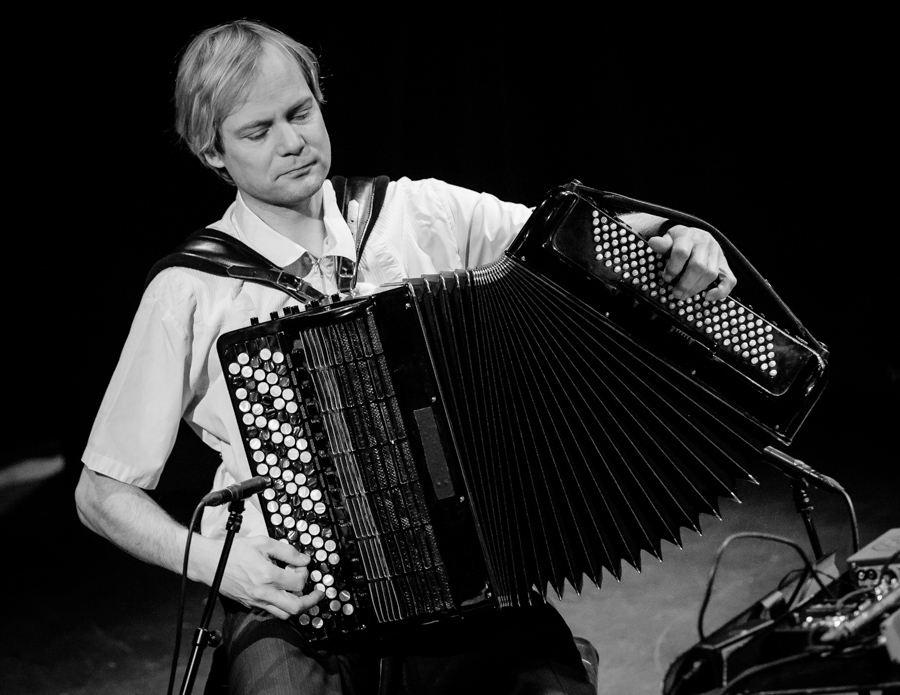
Frode Haltli at Victoria, Nasjonal Jazzscene.

The following is a list of notable events and releases of the year 2018 in Norwegian music.

== Events ==
=== January ===
- 11 – The 17th All Ears festival started in Oslo (January 11–14).
- 19 – The 37th annual Djangofestival started on Cosmopolite in Oslo (January 19–20).
- 25 – The 31st Nordlysfestivalen started in Tromsø (January 25 – February 4).
- 30 – The Barokkfest started in Trondheim (January 30 – February 4).
- 31
  - The 7th Bodø Jazz Open started in Bodø (January 31 – February 3).
  - The 13th Ice Music Festival started in Geilo (January 31 – February 4).

=== February ===
- 1 – The 20th Polarjazz Festival started in Longyearbyen, Svalbard (February 1–4).
- 3 – The Oslo Operaball was arranged in Oslo (February 3–4).
- 21 – The Hemsingfestivalen started in Aurdal (February 21–25).
- 23 – Kirsti Huke received the 2017 Radka Toneff Memorial Award.
- 25 – The 2017 Spellemannprisen awards proceeded with Mari Boine as the 2017 honorary award recipient.

=== March ===
- 1 – The By:Larm Festival started in Oslo (March 1–3).
- 7 – The Borealis Festival started in Bergen (March 7–11).
- 9 – The 61st Narvik Winter Festival started in Narvik (March 9–18).
- 10 – Alexander Rybak won Melodi Grand Prix and is the Norwegian representative in the international final.
- 23 – The 45th Vossajazz started in Voss Municipality (March 23–25).
- 29 – The Inferno Metal Festival started in Oslo (March 29 – April 1).

=== April ===
- 18 – The Nidaros Bluesfestival started in Trondheim (April 18–23).

=== May ===
- 4
  - The Balejazz started in Balestrand (May 4–6).
  - The 29th MaiJazz started in Stavanger (May 4–9).
- 9 – AnJazz the Hamar Jazz Festival started at Hamar (May 9–13).
- 16 – Hardanger Musikkfest started at Hardanger (May 16–21).
- 23 – The Festspillene i Bergen started in Bergen (May 23 – June 6).
- 25 – The 46th Nattjazz started in Bergen (May 26 – June 4).

=== June ===
- 2 – The National Music Day was arranged in Oslo.
- 8 – The Kråkeslottfestivalen started at Senja (June 8–10).
- 12
  - The Bergenfest started in Bergen (June 12–16).
  - The Norwegian Wood music festival started in Oslo (June 12–16).
- 26 – The Risør kammermusikkfest started in Risør (June 26 – July 1).

=== July ===
- 4 – The Kongsberg Jazzfestival opened at Kongsberg consert (August 4–7).
- 7 – The 22nd Skånevik Bluesfestival started in Skånevik, Norway, with Jeff Beck as headliner (July 7 – 9).
- 12 – The 17th Stavernfestivalen started in Stavern (August 12–14).
- 16 – The Moldejazz starts in Molde (August 16–21).
- 19 – The Slottsfjell Festival started in Tønsberg (July 19–21).
- 25 – The 23rd Canal Street Festival started in Arendal (July 25–28).

=== August ===
- 2 – The 31st Notodden Blues Festival started in Notodden (August 2 – 5).
- 7 – The 20th Øyafestivalen started in Oslo (August 7–11).
- 8 – The 32nd Sildajazz starts in Haugesund (August 8–12).
- 9 – The Tromsø Jazz Festival started in Tromsø (August 9 – 12).
- 12 – The 33rd Oslo Jazzfestival starts in Oslo (August 12–18).
- 17 – The Parkenfestivalen starts in Bodø (August 17–18).
- 30
  - The 14th Punktfestivalen opens in Kristiansand (August 30 - September 1|).
  - The Blues in Hell starts in Stjørdal Municipality (August 30 – September 3).
- Nathalie Stutzmann is appointed as new chief conductor for Kristiansand Symphony Orchestra. The French conductor is engaged for three years, and succeeds Giordano Bellincampi.

=== September ===
- The Granittrock Festival starts in Grorud.

=== October ===
- 18 – The 35th DølaJazz starts in Lillehammer (October 18 – 21).
- 27 – The Osafestivalen starts in Voss Municipality (October 26 – 28).
- 30 – The Oslo World Music Festival started in Oslo (October 30 – November 4).

=== November ===
- 14 – The Vardø Blues Festival (Blues i Vintermørket) starts (November 14 – 18).

=== December ===
- 11 – The Nobel Peace Prize Concert is held at Telenor Arena.

== Albums released ==
=== January ===
Day	Album	Artist	Label	Notes	Ref.
19	Lucus	Thomas Strønen & Time Is A Blind Guide	ECM		

=== February ===
Day	Album	Artist	Label	Notes	Ref.
2	Delights Of Decay	Batagraf	Jazzland	Produced by Jon Balke, Kåre Christoffer Vestrheim	
2	Live at Victoria	Solveig Slettahjell	Jazzland	Produced by Solveig Slettahjell	
9	Go Dig My Grave	Susanna	SusannaSonata	Produced by Susanna and Deathprod	
13	Heat	Knut Reiersrud Band	Jazzland	Produced by Solveig Slettahjell	

=== March ===
Day	Album	Artist	Label	Notes	Ref.
2	Ravensburg	Mathias Eick	ECM	Produced by Manfred Eicher	
9	Atonement	Bendik Hofseth	C+C Records	Jazz	
9	Endless Love	Sivert Høyem	Hektor Grammofon	Rock / Pop	
9	Joy	Karin Krog	Meantime Records	Jazz (vinyl)	
9	Run Wolf	Mikkel Gaup	MTG Records	Rock / Pop / World music	
9	Traces of You	Kristin Asbjørnsen	Global Sonics / Øra	Jazz	
23	In-House Science	Arild Andersen with Paolo Vinaccia, and Tommy Smith	ECM		
23	Oslo	Michael Wollny, feat. The Norwegian Wind Ensemble and Geir Lysne	ACT	Produced by Siggi Loch	
23	Powered By Life	Dalia Faitelson	Losen	Produced by Dalia Faitelson	
23	Returnings	Jakob Bro with Palle Mikkelborg, Thomas Morgan, and Jon Christensen	ECM	Produced by Manfred Eicher	

=== April ===
Day	Album	Artist	Label	Notes	Ref.
20	Barxeta II	Per Mathisen & Jan Gunnar Hoff feat. Horacio "El Negro" Hernandez	Losen	Produced by Jan Gunnar Hoff and Per Mathisen	
20	Freedoms Trio II	Steinar Aadnekvam	Losen	Produced by Steinar Aadnekvam	

=== May ===
Day	Album	Artist	Label	Notes	Ref.
18	A Suite Of Poems	Ketil Bjørnstad, Anneli Drecker, poems by Lars Saabye Christensen	ECM		

=== August ===
Day	Album	Artist	Label	Notes	Ref.
31	Helsinki Songs	Trygve Seim	ECM		
31	The Other Side	Tord Gustavsen Trio	ECM		

== New Artists ==
- Birgitta Elisa Oftestad, classical cellist and winner of the NRK talent award Virtuos.

== Deaths ==
January

- 29 – Asmund Bjørken, jazz and traditional folk accordionist and saxophonist (born 1933).
- 30 – Bjørn Boysen, organist (born 1943).

February

- 4 – Leif Rygg, traditional folk Hardanger fiddler (born 1940).
- 5 – Ove Stokstad, graphic artist, jazz clarinetist and saxophonist (born 1939).
- 16 – Tor Brevik, composer (born 1932).

March

- 9 – Ole H. Bremnes, folk singer and poet (born 1930).
- 18 – Håkon Banken, singer (born 1949)
- 31 – Frode Viken, guitarist and songwriter, D.D.E. (born 1955).

April

May

- 11 – Mikhail Alperin, Ukrainian born jazz pianist, member of the Moscow Art Trio, professor at the Norwegian Academy of Music (born 1956).

June

July

- 5 – Bjørn Lie-Hansen, opera singer (born 1937).
- 25 – Roald Stensby, rock singer (born 1940).

== See also ==
- 2018 in Norway
- Music of Norway
- Norway in the Eurovision Song Contest 2018
- Spellemannprisen
- Buddyprisen
- Nordlysprisen
- Edvard Grieg Memorial Award
- Thorgeir Stubø Memorial Award
- Rolf Gammleng Memorial Award
- Radka Toneff Memorial Award
