= 2017 in Norwegian music =

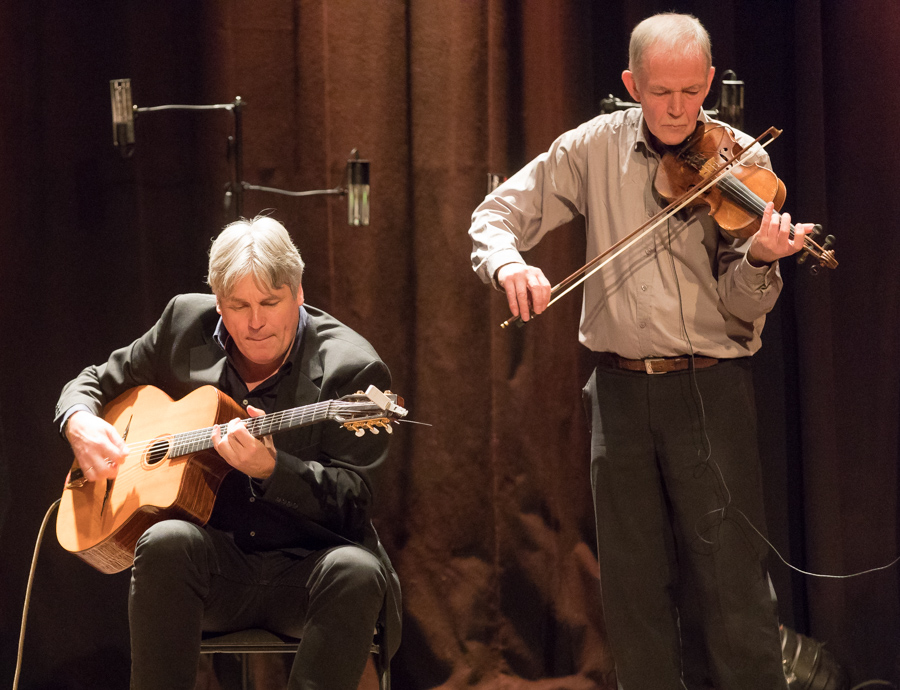
Jon Larsen and Finn Hauge during Djangofestivalen at Cosmopolite in Oslo.

The following is a list of notable events and releases of the year 2017 in Norwegian music.

== Events ==
=== January ===
- 12 – The 16th All Ears festival started in Oslo (January 12–15).
- 20 – The 36th annual Djangofestival started at Cosmopolite in Oslo (January 20–21).
- 21 – Hot Club de Norvège headline at the annual Djangofestival at Cosmopolite in Oslo, Norway.
- 28 – Presentation of the Spellemannprisen awards.

=== February ===
- 1 – The 6th Bodø Jazz Open started in Bodø, Norway (February 1–4).
- 2 – The 19th Polarjazz Festival started in Longyearbyen, Svalbard (February 2–5).
- 4 – The Oslo Operaball was arranged in Oslo (February 4–5).
- 9 – The 12th Ice Music Festival started in Geilo, Norway (February 9–11).

=== March ===
- 2 – The By:Larm Festival started in Oslo (March 2–4).
- 11 – Selection of the contributor of Norway in the Eurovision Song Contest 2017.
- 17 – The 60th Narvik Winter Festival started in Narvik (March 17–26).
- 29 – The Fartein Valen Festival started in Haugesund (March 29 – April 2).

=== April ===
- 7 – The 44th Vossajazz started in Voss, Norway (April 7–9).
- 12 – Inferno Metal Festival 2017 started in Oslo (April 12–15).
- 15 – The Sámi Grand Prix took place at Báktehárji in Kautokeino.

=== May ===
- 5 – The Balejazz started in Balestrand (May 5–7).
- 9 – The 28th MaiJazz started in Stavanger (May 9–14).
- 10 – The 13th AnJazz, the Hamar Jazz Festival started at Hamar, Norway (May 10–14).
- 24 – The Festspillene i Bergen started in Bergen (May 24 – June 7).
- 26
  - The 45th Nattjazz started in Bergen (May 26 – June 4)
  - Fabio Biondi announces the termination of his commitment as early music programme director for Stavanger Symphony Orchestra (2006–2017).

=== June ===
- 3 – The National Music Day was arranged in Oslo.
- 14 – The Bergenfest started in Bergen (June 14–17).
- 17 – The Norwegian Wood music festival started in Oslo.

=== July ===
- 5 – The Kongsberg Jazzfestival opened at Kongsberg concert (August 5–8).
- 6
  - The 17th Stavernfestivalen started in Stavern (July 6 – 8).
  - The 21st Skånevik Bluesfestival started in Skånevik (July 6 – 8).
- 12 – The Slottsfjell Festival started in Tønsberg (July 12–15).
- 17 – The Moldejazz started in Molde (August 17–22).
- 20 – The Bukta Festival started in Telegrafbukta, Tromsø (August 20–22).
- 25 – Singer-songwriter Susanne Sundfør starred in a Prom concert at London's Royal Albert Hall, performing songs by Scott Walker.
- 26 – The Canal Street Festival started in Arendal (July 26–29).
- 27 – The Márkomeannu Festival started in Skånland (July 27–29).

=== August ===
- 3 – The 30th Notodden Blues Festival started in Notodden (August 3–6).
- 8 – The 19th Øyafestivalen started in Oslo ( August 8–13).
- 9 – The Kalottspel started in Målselv (August 9–13).
- 10
  - The Rosendal Kammermusikkfestival started in Rosendal (August 10–13).
  - The Tromsø Jazz Festival started in Tromsø (August 10 – 13).
- 12 – The 32nd Oslo Jazzfestival started in Oslo (August 12–19).
- 18 – The Parkenfestivalen started in Bodø (August 18–19).
- 30 – The Blues in Hell started in Stjørdal (August 30 – September 3).
- 31 – The 12th Punktfestivalen started in Kristiansand (August 31 – September 2).

=== September ===
- 1 – The Granittrock Festival started in Grorud (September 1–2).

=== October ===
- 19 – The 34th DølaJazz started in Lillehammer (October 19–22).
- 27 – The Osafestivalen started in Voss (October 27–29).
- 31 – The Oslo World Music Festival started in Oslo (October 31 – November 5).

=== November ===
- 8 – The Vardø Blues Festival (Blues i Vintermørket) started (November 8–12).

=== December ===
- 11 – The Nobel Peace Prize Concert was held at Telenor Arena.

== Albums released ==
=== January ===
Day	Album	Artist	Label	Notes	Ref.
2	Furatus (Music by Edvard Grieg, Kosaku Yamada, Dmitry Shostakovich, Geirr Tveitt and Carl Nielsen)	Ole Edvard Antonsen & Wolfgang Plagge	2L		
6	Pentagon Tapes	Dag Arnesen	Losen		
13	Politur Passiarer	Scheen Jazzorkester & Audun Kleive	Losen		
20	Chromola	1982 (Nils Økland, Sigbjørn Apeland, Øyvind Skarbø)	Heilo		
20	Vit	Christer Fredriksen	Losen	Produced by Christer Fredriksen	
27	Quiet Dreams	Hilde Hefte	Ponca Jazz		

=== February ===
Day	Album	Artist	Label	Notes	Ref.
3	Ut Og Se Noe Annet	Marthe Wang	Kirkelig Kulturverksted	Produced by Markus Lillehaug Johnsen	
10	The High Heat Licks Against Heaven	Nidingr	Season of Mist		
17	Axis	Jon Irabagon, Hegre & Drønen	Rune Grammofon		
24	Helluva	Trollfest	Napalm Records		
24	The Roc	Daniel Herskedal	Edition Records	Produced by Daniel Herskedal	

=== March ===
Day	Album	Artist	Label	Notes	Ref.
3	Rímur	Trio Mediaeval / Arve Henriksen	ECM	Produced by Manfred Eicher	
7	Animals	Megalodon Collective	Jazzland Recordings		
10	Stereotomic	Nypan	Losen		
17	Metrics	Stephan Meidell	Hubro		
31	Revelation For Personal Use	Anneli Drecker	Rune Grammofon	Produced by Anneli Drecker	

=== April ===
Day	Album	Artist	Label	Notes	Ref.
7	Nattsongar	Erlend Apneseth / Ole Morten Vågan / Hans Hulbækmo)	Hubro	Produced by Andreas R Meland* and Erlend Apneseth. Nominated for the traditional folk Spellemannprisen	
14	Forces of the Northern Night	Dimmu Borgir	Nuclear Blast	Live album	
21	Guzuguzu	Helge Lien Trio	Ozella	Nominated for the jazz Spellemannprisen	

=== May ===
Day	Album	Artist	Label	Notes	Ref.
5	Kingdom	Alexi Tuomarila, Mats Eilertsen, and Olavi Louhivuori	Edition	Produced by Alexi Tuomarila, executive producer Dave Stapleton	
5	Fait Pleurer Les Songes	Guro Kleven Hagen and Marianna Shirinyan	Simax Classics	Executive producer Erik Gard Amundsen. Nominated for the classical music Spellemannprisen	
5	Towards Language	Arve Henriksen	Rune Grammofon	Produced by Jan Bang, co-produced by Arve Henriksen	
12	Ståle Kleiberg: Mass for Modern Man	Ståle Kleiberg performed by Eivind Gullberg Jensen, Mari Eriksmoen, Trondheim Symphony Choir, and Trondheim Symphony Orchestra conducted by Johannes Weisser	2L		
12	Strimur	Anne Hytta	ta:lik	Produced by Tore Bolstad. Recipient of the traditional folk Spellemannprisen	

=== June ===
Day	Album	Artist	Label	Notes	Ref.
9	Northern Timbre	Ragnhild Hemsing and Tor Espen Aspaas	2L		
16	A Piece Of The Apple	Frode Kjekstad	Losen	Produced by Frode Kjekstad	
23	Interactions	Kåre Kolve	Curling Legs	Commission for Vossajazz	

=== July ===
Day	Album	Artist	Label	Notes	Ref.
21	BACH – Inside Polyphony	Christian Grøvlen	2L	Recorded November 2016 in Sofienberg Church. 2L-139	

=== August ===
Day	Album	Artist	Label	Notes	Ref.
2	So is my love	Mari Skeie Ljones, Ensemble 96 & Nina T. Karlsen	2L		
18	Rathkes Gate 12:21:58	Bendik Hofseth / Jacob Young / Paolo Vinaccia	Oslo Session Recordings		
18	Utopian Tales	Stein Urheim	Hubro	Produced by Jørgen Træen and Stein Urheim	
25	Brothers	Adam Baldych and Helge Lien Trio featuring Tore Brunborg	ACT	Produced by Siggi Loch with the artist	
31	Carla.The Fish	Espen Rud	Curling Legs		

=== September ===
Day	Album	Artist	Label	Notes	Ref.
1	5	Eple Trio	Shipwreckords		
1	Carla. The Fish	Espen Rud	Curling Legs		
8	Bjørn Kruse: Chronotope - Concerto for Clarinet and Orchestra	Fredrik Fors / Christian Eggen / Oslo Philharmonic Orchestra	Lawo Classics	Recipient of the composer Spellemannprisen	
8	The Tower	Motorpsycho	Rune Grammofon	Produced by Bent Sæther. Nominated for the rock Spellemannprisen	
15	Åra	Erlend Apneseth Trio	Hubro	Produced by Andreas R Meland and Erlend Apneseth Trio. Nominated for the open class Spellemannprisen	
15	Blank Out	Ellen Andrea Wang	Jazzland Recordings	Nominated for the jazz Spellemannprisen	
15	Clocks	Erland Dahlen	Hubro	Produced by Erland Dahlen	
15	Try Not to Freak Out	Sløtface	Propeller Recordings	Produced by Dan Austin. Recipient of the rock Spellemannprisen	
22	Deep Calleth Upon Deep	Satyricon	Napalm Records	Nominated for the metal Spellemannprisen	
22	Old Songs	Olga Konkova and Jens Thoresen	Losen Records		
25	Vi Är Ledsna Men Du Får Inte Längre Vara Barn	Hegge	Particular Recordings	Recipient of the jazz Spellemannprisen	
29	Circle Of Chimes	Marius Neset	ACT	Produced by Marius Neset, co-produced by Anton Eger. Nominated for the jazz Spellemannprisen	
29	Everybody Loves Angels	Bugge Wesseltoft	ACT	Produced by Siggi Loch with the artist	
29	Pastor´n	Asmundsen & Co	Losen	Produced by Tine Asmundsen and Vidar Johansen. All compositions by Einar “Pastor´n” Iversen.	

=== October ===
Day	Album	Artist	Label	Notes	Ref.
6	Freedom Nation	Natalie Sandtorv	Øra Fonogram	Commission for Moldejazz	
6	Leave Me Breathless	Ane Brun	Balloon Ranger Recordings		
11	Annen Hvert Sekund ... Kvinneskjebner	Hege Tunaal	Grappa Music	Produced by Lars Klevstrand	
13	E	Enslaved	Nuclear Blast	Recipient of the metal Spellemannprisen	
13	Flyge Fra	Frida Ånnevik	Grappa Music	Recipient of the folk Spellemannprisen	
13	Homage	Vilde Frang	Warner Classics	Recipient of the classic Spellemannprisen	
20	Lysning	Nils Økland Band	Hubro Music	Produced by Audun Strype. Recipient of the open class Spellemannprisen	
20	Unrest	Erik Honoré	Hubro Music	Produced by Erik Honoré	
22	Kornstad + KORK Live	Kornstad Ensemble & Norwegian Radio Orchestra	Grappa Music	Produced by Geoff Miles and Håkon Kornstad	
27	Blackbox	Major Parkinson	Degaton Records		
27	It’s Alright Between Us As It Is	Lindstrøm	Smalltown Supersound		
27	Not Nearly Enough To Buy A House	Kjetil Mulelid Trio	Rune Grammofon		
27	Skinhorse Playground	Sol Heilo	Propeller		

=== November ===
Day	Album	Artist	Label	Notes	Ref.
3	Attersyn EP	Gåte	Drabant Music	DM52EP	
3	Baby	Propan	Va Fongool	VAFCD017	
3	Fear Is A Demon	Jonas Alaska	Braveheart	Distributed by Musikkoperatørene. BH201703CD/LP	
3	From The Poisonous Tree	Electric Eye	Jansen Records	JANSEN093CD/LP	
3	Nahnou Houm	Jon Balke, Siwan	ECM	Produced by Manfred Eicher	
3	Puzzle Wood	Natasha Barrett	Aurora	Nominated for the contemporary Spellemannprisen	
3	Unloved	Maciej Obara Quartet (Dominik Wania, Ole Morten Vågan, Gard Nilssen)	ECM	Produced by Manfred Eicher	
3	Velkommen Inn	Hekla Stålstrenga	ta:lik	TA172	
10	I Wish Like Every Day Could Be Christmas	Flaata/Ackles/Busk	Grappa	Elvis X-Mas. GRCD4555	
10	Jazzkammer	Helge Iberg	Odin	ODINCD9563	
10	Så Vide Fara Dei Lindarord	Sogesong (Anne Hytta/Øyonn Groven Myhren)	Heilo	Produced by Tellef Kvifte. Nominated for the traditional folk Spellemannprisen	
17	Appassionata	Tina Margareta Nilssen	2L	Recorded October 2016 in Sofienberg Church, Norway. 2L142SACD	
17	Music Without Borders	Annbjørg Lien	Heilo	HCD7324	
17	Ikkje Ver Blug, Kyss Meg	Vegar Vårdal	Heilo	HCD7327	
17	Louder Than You	Molecules & Erlend Skomsvoll	Øra Fonogram	OF121	
17	Sundown	Kristoffer Kompen	Kompis Records	KRE111	
17	Worst Generation	Nakama	Nakama Records	NKM013CD	
24	En Dag På Jorden	Benny Borg	Redbrick Records	BB04	
24	Kong Vinter	Taake	Dark Essence Records		
24	Plastic Sun (Remastered)	Svein Finnerud Trio	Odin	Originally released in 1970. ODINCD9558	
24	Space In Between	Vigleik Storaas/Tor Yttredal	Inner Ear	INEA24	
24	Steamdome	Ola Kvernberg	Grappa	Nominated for the open class Spellemannprisen	
24	You I Me	Kim Myhr	Hubro	HUBROLP3593	

=== December ===
Day	Album	Artist	Label	Notes	Ref.
1	Kroks Bok	Bjørn Krokfoss	Hot Club Records	HCRBOK556	
1	Orchestral Works	Hans Mathisen	Curling Legs	CLPCD161	
1	Meander	Jo David Meyer Lysne & Mats Eilertsen	Øra Fonogram	OF128	
1	Noen Ganger Og Andre	Cezinando	Warner Music Norway	Recipient of the Spellemannprisen urban award	
8	Mozart / Schoenberg	Ensemble Allegria	Lawo Classics	LWC1138	

== New Artists ==
- Sigrid, singer and recipient of the newcomer Spellemannprisen.

== Deaths ==
January

- 18 – Ståle Wikshåland, musicologist (born 1953).

February

- 22 – Dag Østerberg, sociologist and musicologist (born 1938)

April

- 9 – Knut Borge, journalist, entertainer, and jazz enthusiast (born 1949).
- 10 – Øyvind Klingberg, pianist and showman, Dizzie Tunes (born 1943).
- 18 – Arild Engh, drummer, Ole Ivars (born 1946).

June

- 7 – Jan Høiland, singer and entertainer (born 1939

July

- 7 – Egil Monn-Iversen, composer and pianist (born 1928).
- 13 – Egil Kapstad, jazz pianist and composer (born 1940).

October

- 7 – Jan Arvid Johansen, folk singer and musician (born 1943).
- 22 – Atle Hammer, jazz trumpeter (born 1932).

December

- 21 – Halvard Kausland, jazz guitarist (born 1945).

== See also ==
- 2017 in Norway
- Music of Norway
- Norway in the Eurovision Song Contest 2017
- Spellemannprisen
- Buddyprisen
- Nordlysprisen
- Edvard Grieg Memorial Award
- Thorgeir Stubø Memorial Award
- Rolf Gammleng Memorial Award
- Radka Toneff Memorial Award
