= 1963 in Norwegian music =

The following is a list of notable events and releases of the year 1963 in Norwegian music.

== Events ==
=== May ===
- The 11th Bergen International Festival started in Bergen, Norway.

=== July ===
- The 3rd Moldejazz started in Molde, Norway.

== Albums released ==
=== Unknown date ===
G

Rowland Greenberg Quartet

- Live at Metrol 7-inch EP (Harmoni Records)

== Deaths ==
April

- 11 – Arvid Gram Paulsen, jazz saxophonist, trumpeter, and composer (born 1922).
- 19 – Gunnar Kjeldaas, composer (born 1890).

== Births ==
February

- 2 – Vigleik Storaas, jazz pianist and composer.
- 7 – Einar Røttingen, classical pianist and music teacher.

March

- 31 – Geir Rognø, bassist.

April

- 8 – Tine Asmundsen, jazz bassist.
- 28 – Henrik Hellstenius, composer and musicologist.

June

- 2 – Per Arne Glorvigen, bandoneon player and composer.
- 4 – Solveig Kringlebotn, operatic soprano.

July

- 19 – Sverre Indris Joner, pianist, composer, and music arranger.

August

- 14 – Kjartan Kristiansen, guitarist and backing vocalist (DumDum Boys).
- 31 – Baard Slagsvold, bassist and singer (Tre Små Kinesere).

October

- 5 – Ronni Le Tekrø, guitarist (TNT).
- 16 – Doddo Andersen, singer-songwrriter.
- 22 – Benedicte Adrian, singer and artist.

December

- 4 – Ingrid Bjørnov, singer, songwriter, keyboard player, composer and text writer.
- 10 – Ole Amund Gjersvik, upright bassist and composer.
- 25 – Øystein Fevang, singer and choir conductor.

Unknown date

- Johan Sara, Sami yoiker, guitarist, and composer.

== See also ==
- 1963 in Norway
- Music of Norway
- Norway in the Eurovision Song Contest 1963
