= 1966 in Norwegian music =

The following is a list of notable events and releases of the year 1966 in Norwegian music.

== Events ==
=== May ===
- The 14th Bergen International Festival started in Bergen, Norway.

=== June ===
- The 3rd Kongsberg Jazz Festival started in Kongsberg, Norway.

=== July ===
- The 6th Moldejazz started in Molde, Norway.

=== Unknown date ===
- Arne Bendiksen – "Intet er nytt under solen", performed by Åse Kleveland in the Eurovision Song Contest 1966.
- Harald Sæverud – Symphony no 9

== Albums released ==
=== Unknown date ===
K

Karin Krog

- Jazz Moments (Sonet Records)

== Deaths ==
January

- 24 – Pauline Hall (78), writer, music critic, and composer (born 1890).

May

- 13 – Henrik Adam Due, violinist (born 1891).

== Births ==
January

- 10 – Kristin Sevaldsen, jazz saxophonist, composer, and music producer.

April

- 12 – Nils-Olav Johansen, entertainer, jazz guitarist, and singer (Farmers Market).
- 16
  - Jarle Vespestad, jazz drummer and percussionist.
  - Mai Britt Normann, singer and songwriter.

May

- 2 – Kristin von der Goltz, cellist.
- 18 – Ruth Olina Lødemel, soprano, dancer, actor and composer.

August

- 7 – Torstein Ellingsen, drummer and music producer.
- 14 – Øystein Baadsvik, tuba soloist and chamber musician.

June

- 19 – Silje Nergaard, jazz vocalist and songwriter.

September

- 3 – Sébastien Dubé, upright bassist.
- 15 – Håvard Gimse, classical pianist.

October

- 1 – Siri Gellein, jazz vocalist and journalist.
- 26 – Sverre Gjørvad, jazz drummer and composer.

November

- 5 – Øystein B. Blix, jazz trombonist and sound designer.

December

- 5 – Hildegunn Øiseth, jazz trumpeter and hornist.
- 11 – Erik Honoré, writer, musician, record producer and sound engineer.

== See also ==
- 1966 in Norway
- Music of Norway
- Norway in the Eurovision Song Contest 1966
