= 1943 in Norwegian music =

The following is a list of notable events and releases of the year 1943 in Norwegian music.

== Deaths ==
April

- 1 – Anders Hovden, classical pianist, composer and radio personality (born 1860).

== Births ==
March

- 20 – Jon Christensen, jazz drummer (died 2020).

April

- 23 – Knut "Sputnik" Storbukås, musician and truck driver.

August

- 10 – Bjørn Krokfoss, jazz drummer.
- 28 – Anne-Lise Berntsen, soprano singer (died 2012).

October

- 6 – Bjøro Håland, country singer

November

- 12
  - Julie Ege, singer, actress, and model (died 2008).
  - Thorgeir Stubø, jazz guitarist and composer (died 1986).

December

- 3 – Bjørn Boysen, organist (died 2018).
- 30 – Øyvind Klingberg, pianist and showman, Dizzie Tunes (died 2017).

== See also ==
- 1943 in Norway
- Music of Norway
