= 1979 in Norwegian music =

The following is a list of notable events and releases of the year 1979 in Norwegian music.

== Events ==
=== April ===
- 6 – The 6th Vossajazz started in Vossavangen, Norway (April 6 – 8).

=== May ===
- 23
  - The 27th Bergen International Festival started in Bergen, Norway (May 23 – June 6).
  - The 7th Nattjazz started in Bergen, Norway (May 23 – June 6).

=== August ===
- 26 – The 11th Kalvøyafestivalen started at Kalvøya near by Oslo.

== Albums released ==
=== Unknown date ===
A

Bjørn Alterhaug

- Moments (Arctic Records)

E

Jan Eggum

- En Sang Fra Vest (CBS Records)
- En Natt Forbi (CBS Records)

K

Egil Kapstad

- Til Jorden (ECM) with poems by Rolf Jacobsen.

Karin Krog

- Cloud Line Blue (Bluebell Records), with John Surman

N

Lillebjørn Nilsen

- Live At Sioux Falls South Dakota! (Skandisk Records), with Steinar Ofsdal
- Oslo 3 (Skandisk Records)

R

Inger Lise Rypdal

- Inger Lise Rypdal (RCA Victor)

Terje Rypdal

- Terje Rypdal / Miroslav Vitous / Jack DeJohnette (Zarepta Records)

S

Øystein Sunde

- Hærtata Hørt (Philips Records)

T

Jahn Teigen

- En Dags Pause (RCA Victor)
- Klar Dag / Instamatik (RCA Victor)
- Mentalkrem (RCA Victor)

Radka Toneff

- It Don't Come Easy (Zarepta Records)

== Deaths ==
January

- 28 – Elling Enger, composer (born 1905).

March

- 7 – Klaus Egge, composer and music critic (born 1906).

April

- 3 – Ernst Glaser, violinist, orchestra conductor and music teacher (born 1904).

October

- 24 – Trygve Lindeman, cellist and the head of the Oslo Conservatory of Music (born 1896).

== Births ==
January

- 1 – Anders Danielsen Lie, actor, musician and medical doctor.
- 4 – Audun Ellingsen, jazz upright bassist.
- 24 – Anita Auglend, black metal singer (The Sins of Thy Beloved).

February

- 12 – Eth Eonel, singer, songwriter, and producer.

March

- 4 – Stein Urheim, jazz guitarist and composer.
- 10 – Ragnhild Furebotten, fiddler, folk musician and composer
- 20 – Robert Post, singer-songwriter.
- 24 – Jostein Hasselgård, pop singer.

April

- 2 – Stian Westerhus, jazz guitarist.
- 12 – Thomas Dybdahl, singer/songwriter.
- 20 – Kenneth Kapstad, prog rock drummer.
- 25 – Martin Sjølie, pianist, songwriter and record producer.

May

- 4 – Magnus Loddgard, orchestra conductor, pianist and vocal coach.
- 6 – Jan Erik Mikalsen, contemporary composer.
- 8
  - Alf Wilhelm Lundberg, jazz guitarist, pianist, and composer.
  - Ole Morten Vågan, jazz upright bassist.
- 16 – Hermund Nygård, jazz drummer and composer.
- 22 – Christer-André Cederberg, music producer, mixer, audio engineer, and musician.

June

- 23 – Susanna Wallumrød, singer, pianist and composer.
- 26 – Mathias Eick, Norwegian trumpeter.

July

- 8 – Noora Noor, neo soul singer.
- 24 – Heidi Skjerve, jazz singer and composer.

August

- 1 – Bjørn Vidar Solli, jazz guitarist, vocalist, and composer.
- 3 – Maria Haukaas Mittet, pop singer.
- 10 – Ove Alexander Billington, jazz pianist and composer.

October

- 2 – Peter Espevoll, death metal vocalist (Extol).
- 19 – Ingunn Ringvold, roots singer, musician and songwriter.
- 14 – Marcus Paus, composer.

November

- 3 – Sampda Sharma, singer and actress.
- 18 – Einar Selvik, black metal drummer (Gorgoroth).

December

- 6 – Ørjan Matre, contemporary composer.
- 10 – Tora Augestad, singer and actor.
- 20 – Benedikte Shetelig Kruse, singer and actor.
- 27 – Hanne Sørvaag, singer and songwriter.

Unknown date

- Espen Reinertsen, jazz saxophonist, flutist, and composer.

== See also ==
- 1979 in Norway
- Music of Norway
- Norway in the Eurovision Song Contest 1979
