= 1950 in Norwegian music =

The following is a list of notable events and releases of the year 1950 in Norwegian music.

== Deaths ==
February

- 23 – Cally Monrad, singer, actress, and poet (born 1879).

March

- 6 – Vilhelm Dybwad, songswriter, barrister and writer of comedies and revues (born 1863).

April

- 5 – William Farre, composer (born 1874).
- 6 – Signe Lund, composer (born 1868).

== Births ==
January

- 5 – Halvdan Sivertsen, singer-songwriter and guitarist.
- 28 – Gro Anita Schønn, singer and actor (died 2001).

April

- 4 – Andris Snortheim, children's musician (died 2016).
- 5 – Bent Åserud, guitarist and film score composer.
- 17 – Åse Hedstrøm, contemporary composer.

May

- 3 – Dag Arnesen, jazz pianist with a series of album releases.
- 9 – Kjell Solem, musician (died 2010)
- 26 – Ragnar Olsen, writer and folk singer.

June

- 21 – Trygve Thue, guitarist and music producer (died 2022).
- 28 – Guttorm Guttormsen, jazz flautist, saxophonist, music arranger, and composer.

July

- 29 – Trond Granlund, rock and folk singer, composer and guitarist.

August

- 6 – John Pål Inderberg, jazz saxophonist and composer.
- 8 – Synne Skouen, music writer and composer.

September

- 5 – Kari Svendsen, singer, banjo player and revue artist.

December

- 5 – Sveinung Hovensjø, jazz bass-guitarist and guitarist
- 8 – Bjørn Kjellemyr, jazz upright bassist.
- 21 – Lillebjørn Nilsen, guitarist, singer, and songwriter (died 2024).

== See also ==
- 1950 in Norway
- Music of Norway
