= Lødemel =

Lødemel is a surname. Notable people with the surname include:

- Astrid Lødemel (born 1971), Norwegian alpine skier
- Bjørn Lødemel (born 1958), Norwegian politician
- Ruth Olina Lødemel (born 1966), Norwegian soprano, dancer, actor and composer
