= 2001 in Norwegian music =

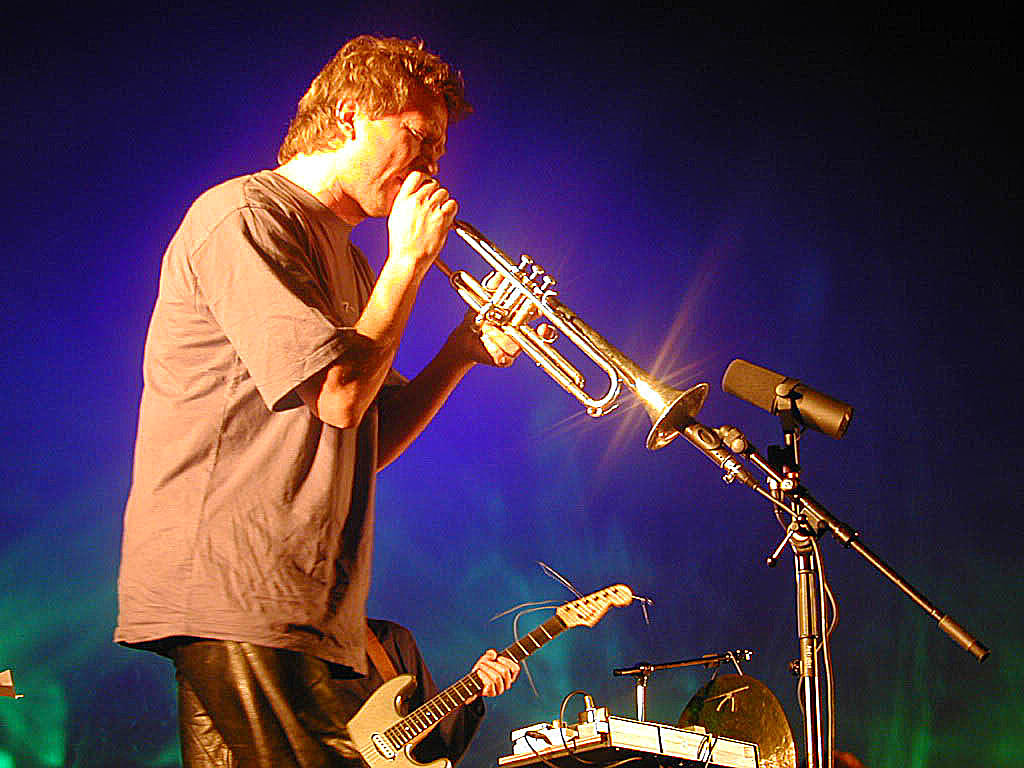
Nils Petter Molvaer 2001 at the Global Tempera, in Tromsø.

The following is a list of notable events and releases of the year 2001 in Norwegian music.

== Events ==
=== January ===
- 19 – The 20th annual Djangofestival started on Cosmopolite in Oslo, Norway (January 19 – 20).
- 25 – The 4th Polarjazz started in Longyearbyen, Svalbard (January 25 – 28).

=== February ===
- 2 – Kristiansund Opera Festival opened (February 2 – 17).
- 22 – The annual By:Larm started in Trondheim, Norway (March 22 – 25).

=== March ===
- |16 – The Oslo Kirkemusikkfestival started in Oslo, Norway (March 16 – 25).

=== April ===
- 6
  - The 28th Vossajazz started at Vossavangen, Norway (April 6 – 8).
  - Stein Inge Brækhus was awarded Vossajazzprisen 2003.
- 7 – Eldbjørg Raknes performs the commissioned work So much depends upon a red wheel barrow for Vossajazz.
- 30 – Ole Blues started in Bergen (April 30 – May 4).

=== May ===
- 9 – The 12th MaiJazz started in Stavanger, Norway (May 9 – 13).
- 23
  - The 29th Nattjazz 2001 started in Bergen, Norway (May 23 – June 2).
  - The start of Bergen International Music Festival Festspillene i Bergen (May 23 – June 3).

=== June ===
- 14 – Norwegian Wood started in Oslo, Norway (June 14 – 16).

=== July ===
- 4 – The 37th Kongsberg Jazzfestival started in Kongsberg, Norway (July 4 – 7).
- 16 – The 41st Moldejazz started in Molde, Norway (July 16 – 21).

=== August ===
- 2 – The 14th Notodden Blues Festival started in Notodden (August 2 – 5).
- 6 – The 16th Oslo Jazzfestival started in Oslo, Norway (August 6 – 12).
- 8 – The 15th Sildajazz started in Haugesund, Norway (August 7 – 11).
- 10 – The annual Øyafestivalen started in Oslo, Norway (August 10 – 11).
- 17 – The Bergen International Chamber Music Festival started in Bergen, Norway (August 17 – 26.

=== September ===
- 4 – The Trondheim Kammermusikk Festival started in Trondheim, Norway (September 4 – 9.

=== Oktober ===
- 5 – The Ultima Oslo Contemporary Music Festival started in Oslo, Norway (Oktober 5 – 14).
- 11 – The DølaJazz started in Lillehammer, Norway (Oktober 11 – 14).

=== November ===
- 8 – The Trondheim Jazz Festival started in Trondheim, Norway (November 8 – 11).

== Albums released ==
=== Unknown date ===
B

Ketil Bjørnstad

- Grace (EmArcy Records), featuring Eivind Aarset, Arild Andersen, Jan Bang, Anneli Drecker, Trilok Gurtu, and Bendik Hofseth
- Before the Light (November Music), featuring Eivind Aarset, Nora Taksdal, and Kjetil Bjerkestrand
- Old (EmArcy Records)

E

Jon Eberson

- Jazz For Men (Curling Legs), with Carl Morten Iversen
- Mind The Gap (Curling Legs), with Bjørnar Andresen and Paal Nilssen-Love

K

Ola Kvernberg

- Violin (Hot Club Records)

S

Kjersti Stubø

- My Shining Hour (Blue Jersey Records)

== Deaths ==
April

- 22 – Ludvig Nielsen, composer, choral conductor and organist at Nidarosdomen (born 1906).
- 24 – Gro Anita Schønn, singer and actor (born 1950).

== See also ==
- 2001 in Norway
- Music of Norway
- Norway in the Eurovision Song Contest 2001
- 2001 in jazz
