= 1949 in Nordic music =

The following is a list of notable events and compositions of the year 1949 in Nordic music.

== Events ==
- 24 March – Gösta Nystroem's Sinfonia del mare (Symphony No 3) receives its première at Gothenburg Concert Hall.
- unknown date – Tromsø University's Department of Traditional Music is established by Arnt Bakke.

== New works ==
- Erik Bergman – Intervalles
- Vagn Holmboe
  - String Quartet No. 2
  - Cantata No. 7
- Rued Langgaard – Symphony No. 15 Søstormen, BVN 375
- Allan Pettersson – Violin Concerto No. 1
- Johnny Schönning – Donky-Fugue
- Fartein Valen – Symphony No.4, Op. 43

== Popular music ==
- Åke Grönberg – "Den gamla dansbanan"
- Reino Helismaa – "Päivänsäde ja menninkäinen"

== Film music ==
- Hugo Alfvén – Singoalla
- Johnny Bode – Åsa-Nisse

== Births ==
- 9 March – Kalevi Aho, Finnish composer
- 2 September – Knut Borge, Norwegian journalist, entertainer and broadcaster (died 2017)
- 19 December – Sebastian, Danish singer

== Deaths ==
- 28 January – Gustaf Nordqvist, Swedish church musician and composer (born 1886)
- 28 September – Nancy Dalberg, Danish composer (born 1881)
- 13 November – Magna Lykseth-Skogman, Swedish operatic soprano (born 1874)

== See also ==
- 1949 in Denmark
- 1949 in Iceland
- 1949 in Norwegian music
- 1949 in Sweden
