= 1964 in Norwegian music =

The following is a list of notable events and releases of the year 1964 in Norwegian music.

== Events ==
=== May ===
- The 12th Bergen International Festival started in Bergen, Norway.

=== June ===
- The 1st Kongsberg Jazz Festival started in Kongsberg, Norway.

=== July ===
- The 4th Moldejazz started in Molde, Norway.

== Albums released ==
=== Unknown date ===
K

Karin Krog

- By Myself (Philips Records)

== Deaths ==
June

- 18 – Egil Rasmussen, author, literature critic and pianist (born 1903).

July

- 1 – Sigurd Islandsmoen, organist and composer (born 1881).

== Births ==
January

- 11 – Torstein Aagaard-Nilsen, contemporary composer.
- 27 – Trond Sverre Hansen, jazz drummer.

February

- 1 – Bugge Wesseltoft, jazz pianist, composer, and music producer, Jazzland Recordings.
- 23 – John Norum, rock guitarist, Europe.

March

- 13 – Reidar Skår, keyboardist, composer, and music producer.

April

- 22 – Johannes Eick, jazz bassist.

May

- 4
  - Roy Lønhøiden, singer, songwriter, and composer.
  - Terje Isungset, percussionist and composer.
- 13 – Harald Devold, jazz saxophonist (died 2016).
- 31 – Carl Petter Opsahl, priest, jazz saxophonist, clarinetist, and journalist.

June

- 1 – Gottfried von der Goltz, violinist and orchestra conductor.
- 9 – Roger Arve Vigulf, clarinet soloist and composer.
- 13 – Helge Lilletvedt, jazz keyboardist, composer, and music arranger.

July

- 17 – Aslak Dørum, writer and bassist, DumDum Boys.
- 24 – Dagfinn Koch, composer and musician.
- 26 – Roar Engelberg, panpipes player.

August

- 10 – Kåre Kolve, jazz saxophonist and composer.

September

- 8 – Joachim «Jokke» Nielsen, rock musician and poet (died 2000).
- 19 – Bjarne Brøndbo, singer and songwriter, D.D.E.

December

- 5 – Arve Furset, composer, jazz pianist, keyboardist, and music producer.
- 25 – Torbjørn Økland, musician, Vamp.

== See also ==
- 1964 in Norway
- Music of Norway
- Norway in the Eurovision Song Contest 1964
