= 1951 in Norwegian music =

The following is a list of notable events and releases of the year 1951 in Norwegian music.

== Events ==
Unknown date

- Frank Meidell Falch was assigned as the first director of the Bergen International Festival (1951–1956).
- The Big Chief Jazz Band was established in Oslo.
- Egil Monn-Iversen and Sølvi Wang were married.

== Deaths ==
April

- 6 – Halfdan Cleve, composer (born 1879).

August

- 10 – Gunnar Gjerstrøm, composer and organist (born 1891).

== Births ==
January

- 14 – Tove Karoline Knutsen, jazz singer, composer, and politician.

March

- 31 – Bodvar Moe, composer, bassist and music teacher.

May

- 7 – Ragnar Sør Olsen, singer and songwriter.

June

- 9 – Geir Bøhren, drummer and film score composer.
- 24 – Willy Bakken, guitarist and popular culture writer (died 2010).

November

- 15 – Gerd Gudding, fiddler, bass guitarist, and singer (died 2015).
- 19 – Per Tveit, pianist and composer (died 2012)
- 26 – Terje Nilsen, singer and songwriter (died 2019).

December

- 8 – Jan Eggum, folk singer and songwriter.
- 10 – Ellen Nikolaysen, singer and actress.
- 20 – Brynjulf Blix, jazz pianist.

December

- 12 – Erik Hillestad, record producer.

== See also ==
- 1951 in Norway
- Music of Norway
