= 1879 in Norwegian music =

The following is a list of notable events and releases of the year 1879 in Norwegian music.

== Deaths ==
December

- 22 – Hanna Bergwitz-Goffeng, pianist and piano teacher (born 1821).

== Births ==
May

- 27 – Per Reidarson, composer and music critic (died 1954).

July

- 31 – Cally Monrad, singer, actress and poet (died 1950).

October

- 5 – Halfdan Cleve, composer (died 1951).
- 23 – Johan Austbø, teacher, dancer, poet, composer, singer, and proponent of Nynorsk (died 1945).

== See also ==
- 1879 in Norway
- Music of Norway
