= 1956 in Nordic music =

The following is a list of notable events and compositions of the year 1956 in Nordic music.

== Events ==
- 24 May – The first-ever Eurovision Song Contest takes place in Switzerland. There is no representation from Scandinavian countries, but Danish radio broadcasts the event.
- 13 June – Jean Sibelius meets the British conductor Sir Malcolm Sargent in Helsinki, and the two are photographed together.
- unknown date – Lars-Erik Larsson begins playing in the Swedish Radio Big Band.

== New works ==
- Erik Bergman – Simbolo
- Lars-Erik Larsson – Concertino for Violin
- Bo Nilsson – Zwei Stücke, for flute, bass clarinet, piano, and percussion
- Allan Pettersson – Symphony No 3
- Hilding Rosenberg – Lento per orchestra d'archi
- Dag Wirén – Quartet for flute, oboe, clarinet and violoncello

== Popular music ==
- Kai Gullmar & Hasse Ekman – "I Heidelberg"

== Film music ==
- Håkan von Eichwald – Flickan i frack
- Sven Gyldmark – Flintesønnerne
- Erland von Koch – Sången om den eldröda blomman
- Ulrik Neumann, Svend Asmussen & Arvid Muller – Kispus

== Births ==
- 15 February – Nils Landgren, Swedish jazz trombonist
- 13 March – John Frandsen, Danish composer
- 14 June – King Diamond, Danish heavy metal vocalist
- 6 July – Bubbi Morthens, Icelandic singer and songwriter
- 8 September – Eivin One Pedersen, jazz accordionist and pianist (died 2012)
- 24 November – Jouni Kaipainen, Finnish composer (died 2015)

== Deaths ==
- 27 January – Harald Heide, Norwegian violinist, conductor, and composer (born 1876)
- 4 February – Peder Gram, Danish organist and composer (born
- 25 March – Sam Rydberg, Swedish military musician and composer (born 1885)
- 20 December – Hildur Andersen, Norwegian pianist and music teacher (born 1864)

== See also ==
- 1956 in Denmark
- 1956 in Finland
- 1956 in Iceland
- 1956 in Norwegian music
- 1956 in Sweden
