= 1911 in Norwegian music =

The following is a list of notable events and releases of the year 1911 in Norwegian music.

== Events ==
October

- 30 – Cally Monrad concert with works of Sverre Jordan, in the theatre of Stavanger.

== Deaths ==
June

- 14 – Johan Svendsen (70), composer, conductor, and violinist.

== Births ==
January

- 1 – Arne Hendriksen, operatic tenor (died 1996).

April

- 1 – Anne-Marie Ørbeck, pianist and composer (died 1996).

September

- 17 – Robert Riefling, classical pianist and music teacher (died 1988).

November

- 25 – Egil Storbekken, traditional folk flautist and composer (died 2002).

December

- 7 – Gottfred Pedersen, composer (died 1941).
- 17 – Cissi Cleve, operatic singer and composer (died 1993).

== See also ==
- 1911 in Norway
- Music of Norway
