= 1881 in Norwegian music =

The following is a list of notable events and releases of the year 1881 in Norwegian music.

== Births ==
May

- 7 – Edvard Sylou-Creutz, classical pianist, composer and radio personality (died 1945).

August

- 27 – Sigurd Islandsmoen, composer and painter (died 1964).
- 28 – Arne Eggen, composer and organist (died 1955).

== See also ==
- 1881 in Norway
- Music of Norway
