= 1922 in Norwegian music =

The following is a list of notable events and releases of the year 1922 in Norwegian music.

== Deaths ==
February

- 22 – Thorvald Lammers, baritone singer, choral conductor, composer, and biographer (born 1841).

October

- 26 – Theodora Cormontan, pianist, music publisher, and composer (born 1840).

== Births ==
January

- 4 – Arvid Gram Paulsen, jazz saxophonist, trumpeter, and composer (died 1963).
- 6 – Finn Mortensen, composer, music critic, and music teacher (died 1983).

February

- 18 – Antonio Bibalo, pianist and composer (died 2008).

June

- 10 – Edvard Hagerup Bull, composer (died 2012).
- 30 – Hanna-Marie Weydahl, pianist (died 2016).

== See also ==
- 1922 in Norway
- Music of Norway
