= 1905 in Norwegian music =

The following is a list of notable events and releases of the year 1905 in Norwegian music.

== Births ==
February

- 22 – Elling Enger, composer and organist (died 1979).

October

- 24 – Kristian Hauger, pianist, orchestra leader and composer of popular music (died 1977).

== See also ==
- 1905 in Norway
- Music of Norway
