= 2012 in Norwegian music =

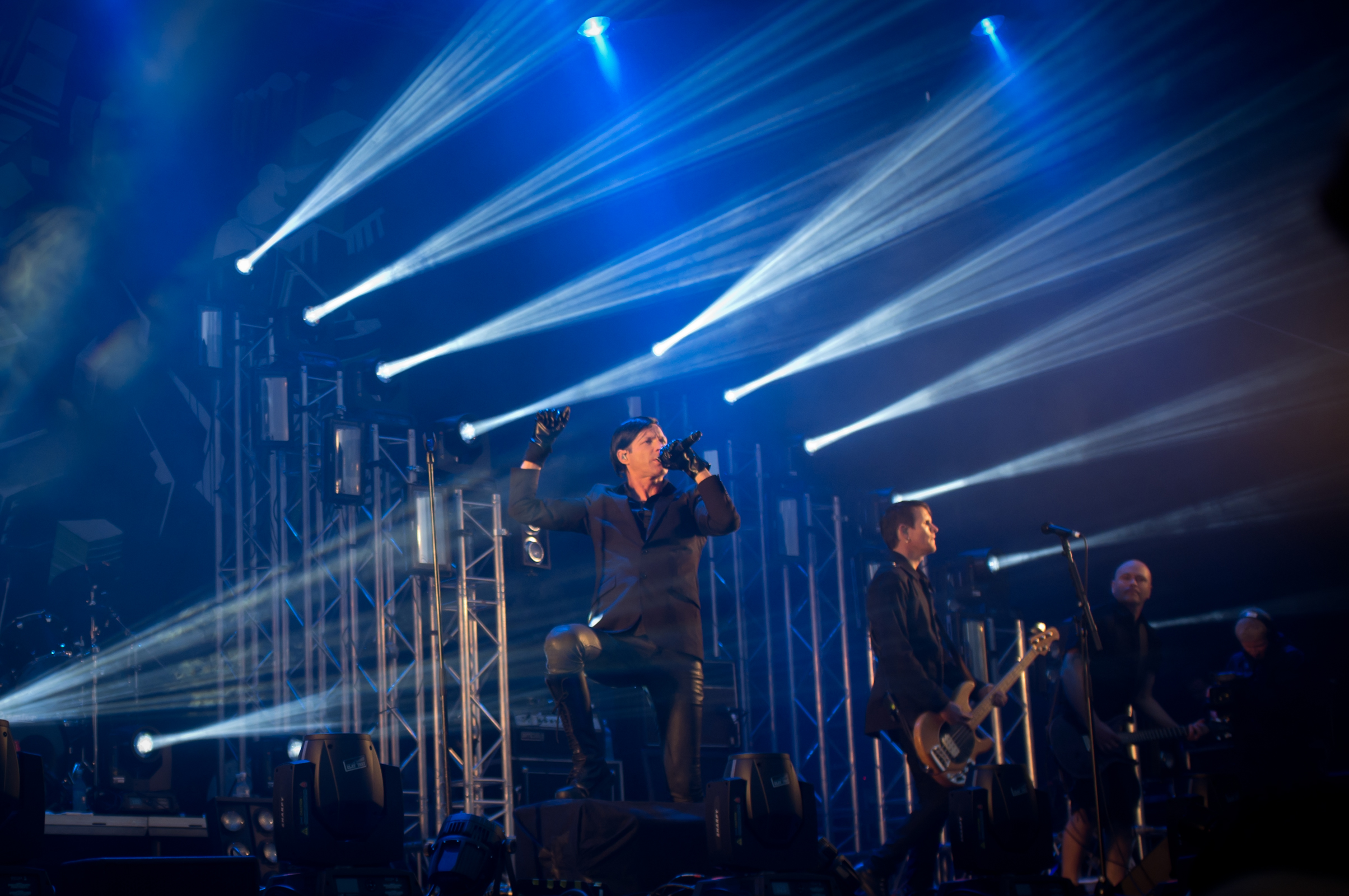
Seigmen at the Slottsfjell Festival in Tønsberg.

The following is a list of notable events and releases of the year 2012 in Norwegian music.

== Events ==
=== January ===
- 25 – Bodø Jazz Open started in Bodø (January 25–28).
- 27
  - Nordlysfestivalen started in Tromsø (January 27 – February 4).
  - Inga Juuso (vocals) was awarded the Nordlysprisen 2012 at Nordlysfestivalen.

=== February ===
- 1 – The Polarjazz Festival 2012 started in Longyearbyen (February 1 – 5).
- 2 – Kristiansund Opera Festival opened (February 2 – 18).

=== March ===
- 9 – Narvik Winter Festival started (March 9 – 18).
- 30 – Vossajazz started in Voss (March 30 – April 2).
- 31
  - Sigrid Moldestad was awarded Vossajazzprisen 2012.
  - Karl Seglem performs the commissioned work Som Spor at Vossajazz.

=== April ===
- 25 – SoddJazz 2012 started in Inderøy Municipality, Nord-Trøndelag (April 25–29).

=== May ===
- 5 – Mathias Eick Quintet was recipient of the BMW Welt Jazz Award 2012.
- 23
  - Festspillene i Bergen starts (May 23 – June 6)
  - Nattjazz starts in Bergen (May 23 – June 2)

=== June ===
- 14 – Norwegian Wood 2012 started in Oslo (June 14 – 17).
- 21 – Bergenfest 2012 started in Bergen (June 21–24).

=== July ===
- 4 – Kongsberg Jazzfestival started at Kongsberg (July 4–7).
- 7 – Ola Kvernberg was recipient of the Kongsberg Jazz Award or DNB.prisen 2012 at the Kongsberg Jazzfestival.
- 16 – Moldejazz started in Molde with Jon Balke as artist in residence (July 16–21).
- 17
  - Mopti was awarded the JazzIntro 2012.
  - Anja Eline Skybakmoen was awarded the Jazztalent 2012.
  - Albatrosh was awarded the JazZtipendiat 2012.

=== August ===
- 2 – The 25th Notodden Blues Festival started in Notodden (August 2 – 5).
- 13
  - Oslo Jazzfestival started in Oslo (August 13–18).
  - Bugge Wesseltoft was recipient of the Ella-prisen 2012 at the Oslo Jazzfestival.

=== September ===
- 6 – Punktfestivalen started in Kristiansand (September 6 – 8).

=== October ===
- 22 – The Ekkofestival started in Bergen (October 22 – November 3).
- 25 – The Insomnia Festival started in Tromsø (October 25 – 27).
- 30 – The Oslo World Music Festival started in Oslo (October 30 – November 4).

=== November ===
- 14 – The Vardø Blues Festival (Blues i Vintermørket) started (November 14 – 18).
- 15 – The 7th Barents Jazz, Tromsø International Jazz Festival started (November 15 – 18).

=== December ===
- 11 – The Nobel Peace Prize Concert was held at Telenor Arena.

== Albums released ==
=== January ===
- 27
  - The Well by Tord Gustavsen Quartet (ECM Records).
  - Klangkammer 1 by Stian Omenås.

=== February ===
- 10 – The Death Defying Unicorn by Motorpsycho and Ståle Storløkken (Rune Grammofon).

=== March ===
Day	Album	Artist	Label	Notes	Ref.
2	Numb, Number	BOL, with Westerhus / Snah	Gigafon		
16	Wild Dog	Susanna	Rune Grammofon	Produced by Deathprod and Susanna	

=== April ===
- 27 – Andrea Kvintett by Andrea Rydin Berge.

=== May ===
- 8 – Reminder by Pixel (Cuneiform Records).
- 11
  - Cabin Music by Ballrogg
  - Northern Arc by Northern Arc

=== August ===
- 27 – Neck of the Woods by Marius Neset and Daniel Herskedal (Edition Records).

=== September ===
- 7 – Atlantis by Elephant9, with Reine Fiske (Rune Grammofon).
- 14 – Möya Og Myten by Eplemøya Songlag (Anja Eline Skybakmoen, Liv Ulvik, Wenche Losnegård)

=== October ===
- 14 – Her Name and Mine – The Oslo Recordings by Fredrik Mikkelsen and Pernille Koch (Little Blue Records).

=== November ===
- 9 – Dream Logic by Eivind Aarset (ECM Records).
- 16 – Noctilucent by Espen Berg (Atterklang – AKLANG306).

=== Unknown date ===
#

A

- Andrea Kvintett by Andrea Kvintett.

B

- Mari Kvien Brunvoll by Mari Kvien Brunvoll.

W

- Spinnaker by Winther – Storm.

== New Artists ==
- LidoLido received the Spellemannprisen award, as 'Best newcomer of the year 2012', for the album Pretty Girls & Grey Sweaters and was with that also recipient of the Gramo grant.
- Mopti was awarded the 2012 'JazzIntro' by the Norwegian Jazz Associations at the Moldejazz, July 17, 2012.

== Deaths ==
January

- 4 – Totti Bergh, jazz saxophonist (born 1935).
- 31 – Anders Eikås, rock drummer, Honningbarna (car accident) (born 1992).

February

- 13 – Nils Grinde, classical organist, musicologist, and theatre historian (born 1927)
- 22 – Eivin One Pedersen, jazz accordionist and pianist (born 1956).

March

- 15 – Edvard Hagerup Bull, contemporary classical composer (born 1922).

April

- 30 – Finn Benestad, musicologist (born 1929)

May

- 13 – Trond Bråthen alias "Trondr Nefas", black metal singer and guitarist, Urgehal (born 1977).

June

- 26 – Harry W. Kvebæk, classical trumpeter and academic (born 1925).

November

- 3
  - Anne-Lise Berntsen, operatic soprano singer (born 1943).
  - Odd Børretzen, author and folk singer, pneumonia (born 1926).
- 15 – Frode Thingnæs, jazz trombonist and bandleader, complications from a heart attack (born 1940).
- 26 – Per Tveit, classical pianist and composer (born 1951)

== See also ==
- 2012 in Norway
- Music of Norway
- Norway in the Eurovision Song Contest 2012
