= 2000 in Norwegian music =

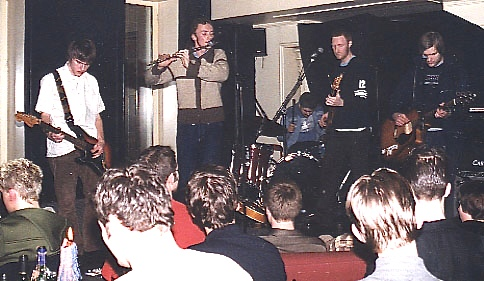
Emely Lang at the 2000 by:larm in Oslo.

The following is a list of notable events and releases of the year 2000 in Norwegian music.

== Events ==
=== January ===
- 28 – The 3rd Polarjazz started in Longyearbyen, Svalbard (February 28–30).

=== February ===
- 2 – The annual by:Larm started in Trondheim, Norway (March 2– ).

=== March ===
- |16 – The Oslo Kirkemusikkfestival started in Oslo, Norway (March 16–25).

=== April ===
- 14 – The 27th Vossajazz started in Vossavangen, Norway (April 14–16).
- 26 – Ole Blues started in Bergen (April 26 – May 1).

=== May ===
- 10 – The 11th MaiJazz started in Stavanger, Norway (May 10–14).
- 24 – The start of Bergen International Music Festival Festspillene i Bergen (May 24 – June 4).
- 25 – The 28th Nattjazz started in Bergen, Norway (May 25 – June 3).

=== June ===
- 10 – The Norwegian Wood started in Oslo, Norway (June 10–12).
- 17 – The 2nd Øyafestivalen started at Kalvøya near by Oslo (June 17–18).

=== July ===
- 5 – The 37th Kongsberg Jazzfestival started in Kongsberg, Norway (July 5–8).
- 17 – The 40th Moldejazz started in Molde, Norway (July 17–22).

=== August ===
- 3 – The 13th Notodden Blues Festival started in Notodden (August 3 – 6).
- 9 – The 14th Sildajazz started in Haugesund, Norway (August 9–13).
- 11 – The 15th Oslo Jazzfestival started in Oslo, Norway (August 11–19).
- 18 – The Bergen International Chamber Music Festival started in Bergen, Norway (August 18–27).

=== September ===
- 5 – The Trondheim Kammermusikk Festival started in Trondheim, Norway (September 5–10).

=== Oktober ===
- 6 – The Ultima Oslo Contemporary Music Festival started in Oslo, Norway (October 6–15).
- 12 – The DølaJazz started in Lillehammer, Norway (October 12–15).

=== November ===
- 2 – The Trondheim Jazz Festival started in Trondheim, Norway (November 2–5).

== Albums released ==
=== Unknown date ===
J

Tore Johansen

- Man, Woman And Child (Gemini Records), featuring Karin Krog

R

Terje Rypdal

- Double Concerto / 5th Symphony (ECM Records)

== Deaths ==
January

- 29 – Beate Asserson, mezzo-soprano opera singer (born 1913).

February

- 12 – Reidar Andresen, popular singer and composer (born 1917).

March

- 6 – Ole Jacob Hansen, jazz drummer (born 1940).
- 18 – Randi Hultin, jazz critic and impresario (born 1926).

April

- 2 – Greta Gynt, singer, dancer and actress (born 1916).

June

- 22 – Svein Finnerud, jazz pianist, painter, and graphic artist (born 1945).

October

- 17 – Joachim «Jokke» Nielsen, rock musician and poet (born 1964).

== See also ==
- 2000 in Norway
- Music of Norway
- Norway in the Eurovision Song Contest 2000
- 2000 in jazz
