= 1977 in Norwegian music =

The following is a list of notable events and releases of the year 1977 in Norwegian music.

== Events ==
=== April ===
- 1 – The 4th Vossajazz started in Vossavangen, Norway (April 1 – 3).

=== May ===
- 25
  - The 25th Bergen International Festival started in Bergen, Norway (May 25 – June 8).
  - The 5th Nattjazz started in Bergen, Norway (May 25 – June 8).

=== June ===
- 26 – The 8th Kalvøyafestivalen started at Kalvøya near by Oslo.

=== September ===
- 11 – The 9th Kalvøyafestivalen started at Kalvøya near by Oslo.

== Albums released ==
=== Unknown date ===
A

Arild Andersen

- Shimri (ECM Records)

E

Jan Eggum

- Heksedans (Columbia Records)

F

Flying Norwegians

- Live (Sonet Records)

G

Jan Garbarek

- Dis (ECM Records)

Haakon Graf

- Blow Out (Compendium Records) with Sveinung Hovensjø, Jon Eberson and Jon Christensen

K

Karin Krog

- But Three's A Crowd (Bluebell Records), with Red Mitchell
- As You Are (The Malmö Sessions) (RCA Victor), with Nils Lindberg
- A Song For You (Phontastic Records), with Bengt Hallberg

R

Inger Lise Rypdal

- Tider Kommer-Tider Går (Talent Records)

T

Jahn Teigen

- Teigen's Tivoli (Polydor Records)

Pål Thowsen

- No Time For Time (Zarepta Records), with Jon Christensen, Terje Rypdal, and Arild Andersen

Radka Toneff

- Winter Poem (Zarepta Records)

V

Jan Erik Vold

- Ingentings Bjeller (Polydor Records), with Jan Garbarek-Bobo Stenson Quartet

== Deaths ==
February

- 8 – Eivind Groven, composer and music critic (born 1901).
- 11 – Trygve Torjussen (91), composer and pianist (born 1885).

October

- 18 – Kristian Hauger, pianist, orchestra leader and composer of popular music (born 1905).

== Births ==
January

- 8 – Torun Eriksen, jazz singer.
- 25 – Christian Ingebrigtsen, singer-songwriter and musician (A1).
- 28 – Sissel Vera Pettersen, Norwegian singer, saxophonist, and composer.
- 31 – Per Zanussi, jazz upright bassist and composer.

February

- 4 – Emil Nikolaisen, multi-instrumentalist and music producer.
- 10 – Mads Hauge, songwriter and record producer.
- 12 – Ruben Sverre Gjertsen, contemporary composer.
- 19 – Andre Lindal, songwriter, record producer and musician.

March

- 1 – Sven Atle "Silenoz" Kopperud, black metal guitarist (Dimmu Borgir).
- 6 – Kirsti Huke, jazz singer and composer.
- 10 – Torstein Lofthus, jazz/prog rock drummer and composer.
- 26 – Håvard Stubø, jazz guitarist and composer.
- 30 – Tor Egil Kreken, jazz guitarist, bassist, and banjo player (Wibutee).

April

- 5 – Håkon Kornstad, jazz saxophonist and operatic tenor (Wibutee).
- 28 – Asbjørn Lerheim, jazz guitarist and music teacher.
- 30 – Ole Jørn Myklebust, jazz trumpeter.

May

- 16 – Erik Faber, pop/rock singer-songwriter.
- 23 – Mads Berven, jazz guitarist.
- 28 – Trond Bråthen, black metal singer-songwriter, guitarist and bassist (died 2012).

June

- 2 – Helena Iren Michaelsen, rock singer.
- 8 – Frøy Aagre, jazz saxophonist.
- 9 – Atle Nymo, jazz saxophonist and bass clarinetist.
- 19 – Anne Nørdsti, singer.
- 22 – Gunilla Süssmann, classical pianist.
- 30
  - Brynjar Rasmussen, jazz clarinetist.
  - Kjersti Horn, theater director and storyboard artist.

August

- 5 – Terje Winterstø Røthing, rock guitarist.
- 7 – Deeyah Khan, singer, music producer, composer, film director, and human rights defender.
- 14 – Pål Mathiesen, musician and vocalist (Susperia).
- 18 – Even Kruse Skatrud, jazz trombonist, composer, music arranger and orchestra leader.
- 28 – Arve Isdal, black metal guitarist and producer.
- 31 – Cornelius Jakhelln, vocalist, guitarist, and poet.

September

- 13 – Julius Lind, jazz and rock double bassist.
- 20 – Martin Horntveth, drummer, composer and electronica artist (Jaga Jazzist).
- 23 – Olav Iversen, heavy metal composer, guitarist and singer.
- 27 – Tor Magne Glidje, guitarist (Extol).

October

- 2 – David Wallumrød, jazz pianist and organist.
- 18 – Christer Espevoll, rock guitarist.

November

- 1 – Anine Kruse, singer and choral conductor.
- 19 – Anne Lilia Berge Strand, singer, songwriter, record producer and DJ.
- 27 – Ivar Bjørnson, black metal guitarist and composer (Enslaved).

December

- 4 – Morten Veland, death metal multi-instrumentalist, composer, songwriter, and producer (Tristania, Sirenia and Mortemia).
- 23 – Tore Johansen, jazz trumpeter.

Unknown date

- Andreas Haddeland, jazz guitarist.
- Even Granås, drummer and guitarist.

== See also ==
- 1977 in Norway
- Music of Norway
- Norway in the Eurovision Song Contest 1977
