= 1953 in Norwegian music =

The following is a list of notable events and releases of the year 1953 in Norwegian music.

== Events ==
=== June ===
- 1 – The 1st Bergen International Festival started in Bergen, Norway (June 1 – 15).

=== Unknown date ===
- The Hot Saints Jazzband was established (1953–60).
- The Big Chief Jazz Club was established at Majorstuhuset in Oslo.

== Deaths ==
December

- 9 – Issay Dobrowen, pianist, composer and conductor (born 1891).

== Births ==
January

- 6 – Jon Eberson, jazz guitarist.

February

- 18 – Erling Aksdal, jazz pianist.

April

- 13 – Tom Olstad, jazz drummer.
- 25 – Per Kolstad, pianist and keyboardist, Lava.

May

- 12 – Odd Riisnæs, jazz saxophonist.

June

- 2 – Vidar Johansen, jazz saxophonist.
- 10 – Svein Nymo, violinist and composer (died 2014).
- 13 – Geir Johnson, composer, writer and initiator of culture projects (died 2021).
- 30 – Ståle Wikshåland musicologist (died 2017).

July

- 10 – Lasse Myrvold, musician and composer, The Aller Værste! (died 2006).
- 13 – Sigurd Ulveseth, jazz upright bassist and orchestra leader.

September

- 8 – Stein-Erik Olsen, classical guitarist and professor of guitar at the University of Bergen.

November

- 2 – Stein Erik Tafjord, jazz tubist.
- 7 – Erik Balke, jazz saxophonist.

Unknown date

- Per Hannevold, bassoonist, Bergen Philharmonic Orchestra and Bergen Woodwind Quintet.

== See also ==
- 1953 in Norway
- Music of Norway
