= 1906 in Norwegian music =

The following is a list of notable events and releases of the year 1906 in Norwegian music.

== Births ==
February

- 3 – Ludvig Nielsen, composer and organist (died 2001).

July

- 19 – Klaus Egge, composer and music critic (died 1979).

== See also ==
- 1906 in Norway
- Music of Norway
