= 1949 in Norwegian music =

The following is a list of notable events and releases of the year 1949 in Norwegian music.

== Events ==
- The Department of Traditional Music was established in Tromsø by Arnt Bakke.

== Births ==
January

- 18 – Håkon Banken, singer (died 2018)

February

March

- 18 – Åse Kleveland, singer, guitarist, and politician.
- 21 – Åge Aleksandersen, singer, songwriter and guitarist.

April

- 2 – Per Husby, jazz pianist, composer, and orchestra leader.

May

- 13 – Philip Kruse, trumpeter, orchestra leader, composer, music arranger, music producer, and text writer.
- 25 – Iver Kleive, composer and organist.

June

- 20 – Harald Halvorsen, jazz trombonist.

August

- 3 – Torgeir Rebolledo Pedersen, architect, poet and playwright.
- 12 – Alex Naumik, Lithuanian-born artist, songwriter and record producer (died 2013).

September

- 2 – Knut Borge, journalist, entertainer, and jazz enthusiast (died 2017).
- 25 – Olav Berg, composer.
- 30 – Lars Klevstrand, singer, guitarist, composer and actor.

October

- 18 – Lasse Thoresen, composer.

December

- 14 – Inger Lise Rypdal, singer and actress.

== See also ==
- 1949 in Norway
- Music of Norway
