= 1941 in Norwegian music =

The following is a list of notable events and releases of the year 1941 in Norwegian music.

== Deaths ==
January

- 27 – Iver Holter, musician and band leader, Norwegian Army Band (born 1850).

December

- 3 – Christian Sinding, composer (born 1856).
- 24 – Godtfred Pedersen, organist and composer (born 1911).
- 31 – Sigwardt Aspestrand, composer (born 1856).

== Births ==
February

- 24 – Kari Onstad, singer and actress (died 2020).

July

- 31 – Frøydis Ree Wekre, professor of horn and wind chamber music (Norwegian Academy of Music).

August

- 6 – Svein Christiansen, jazz drummer (died 2015).

November

- 3 – Carl Høgset, choral conductor (died 2021).
- 9 – John Persen, Sami composer (died 2014).

== See also ==
- 1941 in Norway
- Music of Norway
