= 1928 in Norwegian music =

The following is a list of notable events and releases of the year 1928 in Norwegian music.

== Deaths ==
June

- 17 – Torgrim Castberg, violinist (born 1874).

== Births ==
April

- 14 – Egil Monn-Iversen, composer (died 2017).

August

- 10 – Per Asplin, pianist, singer, composer and actor (died 1996).

November

- 25 – Alf Andersen, flautist (died 1962).

Unknown date

- Per Gunnar Jensen, pop singer, composer, and humanitarian firefighter (died 2014)

== See also ==
- 1928 in Norway
- Music of Norway
