= Bjørn Fongaard =

Norwegian musician and composer (1919–1980)

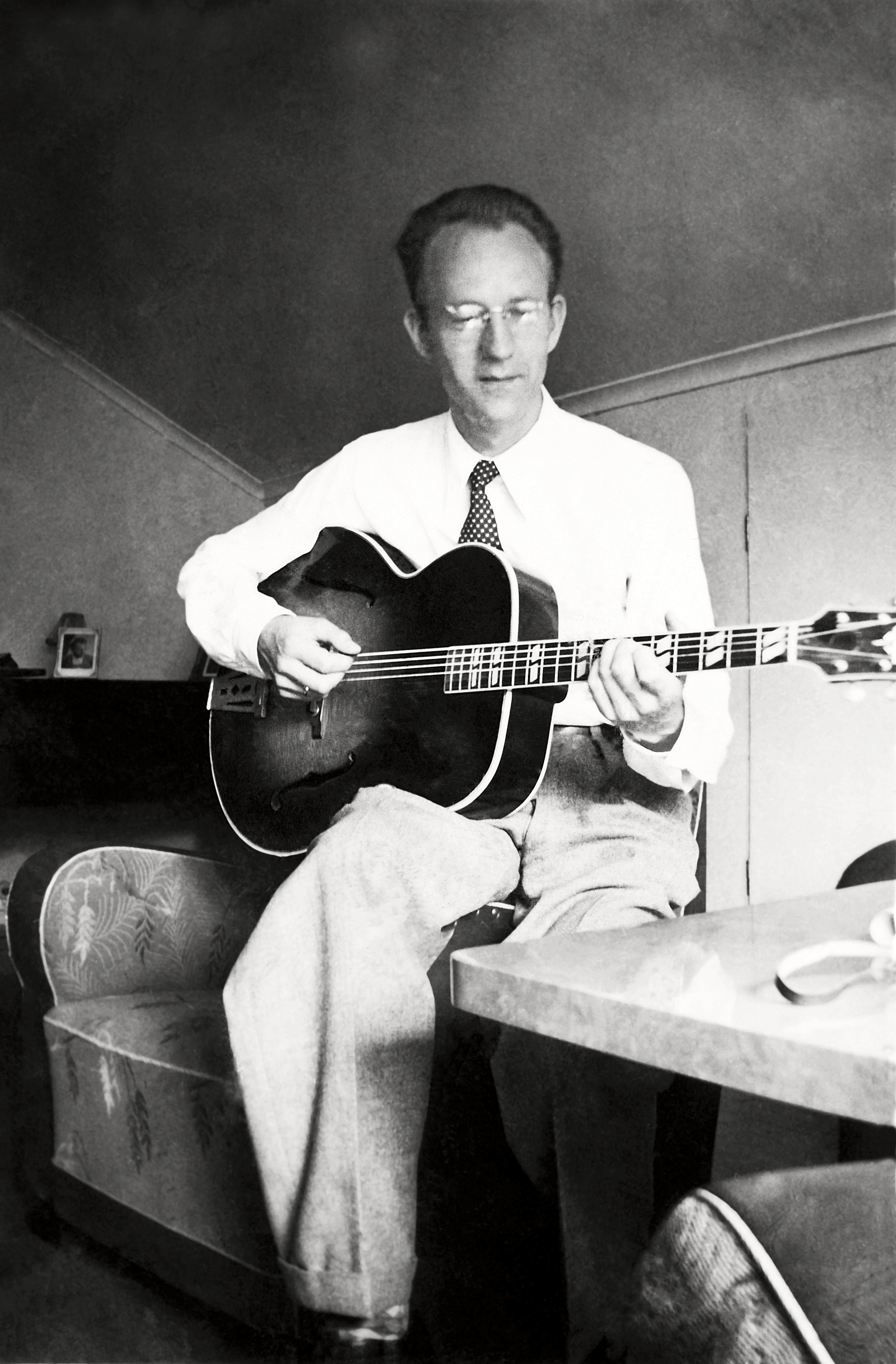
Bjørn Fongaard

Bjørn Fongaard (2 March 1919 in Oslo – 26 October 1980 in Oslo) was a Norwegian composer, guitarist, and teacher. In addition to being concerned with microtonal and electronic music, he was perhaps the first to use the prepared guitar. "Fongaard's output is considerable...Due to the partly experimental notation, these works have not become widely known."

== Life ==
Fongaard grew up in the Oslo borough of Nordstrand. He studied at the Oslo Conservatory of Music with teachers including Per Steenberg, Sigurd Islandsmoen, Bjarne Brustad, and Karl Andersen. He started off by constructing a quarter tone guitar with adaption of the fretboard, but very early left this in favor of a diverse set of prepared guitar techniques. His first pieces in this genre came in the mid 60's. A sampler CD of his own recordings entitled Elektrofoni: Works For Micro Intervallic Guitar 1965-1978 was released in 2011. In 2015, a double disc of new recordings by Norwegian guitarist Anders Førisdal was released on Aurora Records.

== List of works ==
- Galaxy op. 46
- Homo Sapiens op. 80
- Genesis
- Sinfonia Microtonalis op. 79
- Orchestra Antiphonalis
- Symphony of Space
- Universum
- Mare Tranquilitatis
- 23 Concertos for Piano and Orchestra 0p. 118
- 12 Concertos for Solo Instrument and Orchestra op. 120
- 21 String Quartets op. 123
- 57 Sonatas for One Instrument op. 125
- 41 Concertos for Solo Instrument and Tape op. 131
