= Jo David Meyer Lysne =

Norwegian guitarist and composer

- Born: 9 April 1994 (age 31); Bergen
- Genres: Jazz
- Occupation(s): Musician, composer
- Instrument(s): Guitar, electronics
- Website: jodavidmeyerlysne.com

Jo David Meyer Lysne (born 9 April 1994 in Førde, Norway) is a Norwegian guitarist and composer known from collaboration with Mats Eilertsen, Wendra Hill, Bendik Baksaas.

== Biography ==
=== Education ===
Lysne studied music at Sund Folk college (2013–14), then he studied improvised music at Norwegian Academy of Music (2014–2018), and lately composition at Norwegian Academy of Music (2018-).

== Discography ==
=== Solo albums ===
- 2020: Kroksjø (Hubro Music), duo with Mats Eilertsen
- 2019: Henger i Luften (Hubro Music), with Joel Ring, Karl Hjalmar Nyberg, Johanne Skaansar, Martin Lie Svendsen, David Timme Cariano
- 2017: Meander (Øra Fonogram), duo with Mats Eilertsen

=== Collaborations ===
With Jenny Berger Myhre

- 2017: Lint (The Lumen Lake)

With 'Wendra Hill For'

- 2017: Stretch. Flex. Draw. (Self release)
