= 1983 in Norwegian music =

The following is a list of notable events and releases of the year 1983 in Norwegian music.

== Events ==
=== March ===
- 25 – The 10th Vossajazz started in Vossavangen, Norway (March 25 – 27).

=== May ===
- 18 – 11th Nattjazz started in Bergen, Norway (May 18 – June 1).

=== August ===
- 21 – The 14th Kalvøyafestivalen started at Kalvøya near by Oslo.

== Albums released ==
=== Unknown date ===
A

Arild Andersen

- Sheila (SteepleChase Records) with Sheila Jordan

O

Oslo 13

- Anti-Therapy (Odin Records)

R

Inger Lise Rypdal

- Just For You (A/S Studio B)

T

Jahn Teigen

- Cheek To Cheek (Odin Records) with Anita Skorgan

== Deaths ==
May

- 23 – Finn Mortensen, composer, critic and educator (born 1922).

October

- 16 – Øivin Fjeldstad, orchestra conductor and violinist who led the Oslo Philharmonic (born 1903).

== Births ==
January

- 20 – Eivind Lønning, jazz trumpeter.

February

- 7 – Benedicte Maurseth, traditional folk singer and fiddler.

April

- 4 – Henrik Maarud, blues and rock drummer (The Grand).
- 20 – Gaute Ormåsen, country and pop singer.

May

- 25 – Rune Nergaard, jazz upright bassist (Bushman's Revenge).

June

- 24 – Gard Nilssen, jazz drummer.
- 30 – Espen Berg, jazz pianist, arranger, and composer, Trondheim Jazz Orchestra.

July

- 1 – Marit Larsen, pop singer and songwriter.
- 16 – Tuva Syvertsen, singer, Hardanger fiddler and accordionist (Valkyrien Allstars).
- 22 – Andreas Ulvo, jazz pianist, organist, keyboarder and composer (Eple Trio).

September

- 30 – Carmen Elise Espenæs, singer and songwriter (Midnattsol).

October

- 14 – Andreas Stensland Løwe, jazz pianist.

November

- 3 – Myrna Braza, singer and composer.
- 10 – Svein Magnus Furu, jazz saxophonist, composer, and music journalist.

December

- 24 – Sigrun Tara Øverland, singer, songwriter, multi-instrumentalist, and music producer.

Unknown date

- Guro Skumsnes Moe, jazz upright bass player, composer and singer.

== See also ==
- 1983 in Norway
- Music of Norway
- Norway in the Eurovision Song Contest 1983
