= 1996 in Norwegian music =

The following is a list of notable events and releases of the year 1996 in Norwegian music.

== Events ==
=== March ===
- 29 – The 23rd Vossajazz started in Vossavangen, Norway (March 29 – 31).

=== May ===
- 18 – The annual Eurovision song contest was held in Oslo, Norway at the Oslo Spektrum.
- 22 – The 24th Nattjazz started in Bergen, Norway (May 22 – June 2).

=== July ===
- 15 – The 36th Moldejazz started in Molde, Norway (July 15 – 20).

=== August ===
- 8 – The 9th Notodden Blues Festival started in Notodden (August 8 – 11).

== Albums released ==
March

- 25 – Visible World (ECM Records), by Jan Garbarek

=== Unknown date ===
K

Karin Krog

- Huskonsert I Aurskog – Musikk Av Og Etter Anders Heyerdahl (Meantime Records)

== Deaths ==
March

- 14 – Maj Sønstevold, composer, pianist, and music teacher (born 1917).

June

- 5 – Anne-Marie Ørbeck, classical pianist and composer (born 1911).

October

- 9 – Per Asplin, pianist, singer, composer and actor (born 1928).
- 29 – Robert Levin, classical pianist and composer (born 1912).

November

- 5 – Arne Hendriksen, operatic tenor (born 1911).

== Births ==
January

- 29 – Nora Foss al-Jabri, singer.

June

- 15 – Aurora (Aksnes), singer and songwriter.
- 29 – Alexandra Rotan, singer.

September

- 5 – Sigrid (Solbakk Raabe), singer and songwriter.

October

- 12 – Astrid S(meplass), singer and songwriter.

November

- 4 – Adelén (Rusillo Steen), singer.

== See also ==
- 1996 in Norway
- Music of Norway
- Norway in the Eurovision Song Contest 1996
