= 1896 in Norwegian music =

The following is a list of notable events and releases of the year 1896 in Norwegian music.

== Deaths ==
September

- 29 – Johan Gottfried Conradi, composer, choir leader, and conductor (born 1820).

December

- 13 – Emma Dahl, soprano singer and Lieder composer (born 1819).

== Births ==
July

- 27 – Ivar F. Andresen, operatic singer (died 1940).

November

- 3 – Trygve Lindeman, cellist and the head of the Oslo Conservatory of Music (born 1979).

December

- 30 – Hans Stenseth, flautist and flute teacher (died 1994).

== See also ==
- 1896 in Norway
- Music of Norway
