= 1917 in Norwegian music =

The following is a list of notable events and releases of the year 1917 in Norwegian music.

== Events ==
- 24 October – The Norwegian Society of Composers (Norsk komponistforening) is founded in Oslo by Gerhard Schjelderup, Eyvind Alnæs and others.

== Births ==
February

- 18 – Eva Gustavson, operatic contralto (died 2009).

April

- 20 – Eva Prytz, operatic soprano (died 1987).

July

- 15 – Reidar Andresen, popular singer and composer (born 2000).

August

- 4 – Ragnar Danielsen, pianist, composer, music arranger, and band leader (died 1976).

September

- 9 – Maj Sønstevold, composer and music teacher (died 1996).

December

- 22 – Hans W. Brimi, farmer, fiddler, and traditional folk music performer (died 1998).

== See also ==
- 1917 in Norway
- Music of Norway
