= 1940 in Norwegian music =

The following is a list of notable events and releases of the year 1940 in Norwegian music.

== Deaths ==
November

- 6 – Ivar F. Andresen, operatic singer (born 1896).

== Births ==
February

- 15 – Trygve Madsen, composer and pianist.

March

- 20 – Frode Thingnæs, jazz trombonist, composer, music arranger, and conductor (died 2012).

April

- 13 – Bjørn Stokstad, Norwegian clarinettist and architect.
- 16 – Ole Jacob Hansen, jazz drummer (died 2000).

May

- 23 – Bjørn Johansen, jazz saxophonist (died 2002).
- 30 – Leif Rygg, traditional folk Hardanger fiddler (died 2018).

August

- 6 – Egil Kapstad, jazz pianist, composer and music arranger (died 2017).

September

- 24 – Roald Stensby, rock singer (died 2018).

October

- 14 – Jack Berntsen, philologist, songwriter and folk singer (died 2010).

November

- 6 – Laila Dalseth, jazz singer.

== See also ==
- 1940 in Norway
- Music of Norway
