= 1891 in Norwegian music =

The following is a list of notable events and releases of the year 1891 in Norwegian music.

== Births ==
February

- 27 – Issay Dobrowen, pianist, composer and orchestra conductor (died 1953).

April

- 19 – Henrik Adam Due, violinist (died 1966).

June

- 5 – Gunnar Gjerstrøm, pianist and composer (died 1951).

== See also ==
- 1891 in Norway
- Music of Norway
