= Nordic jazz =

Music genre

- Stylistic origins: Jazz; Nordic folk music; Modal jazz
- Cultural origins: 1960s–1970s, Scandinavia
- Typical instruments: Saxophone; Piano; Double bass; Drums; Guitar; Trumpet

Regional scenes
- Norway; Sweden; Denmark; Finland; Iceland

Other topics
- ECM Records; Jan Garbarek; European free jazz

Nordic jazz is a style of jazz music that developed in the Nordic countries (Norway, Sweden, Denmark, Finland, and Iceland) and is characterized by a synthesis of jazz with Scandinavian folk music traditions. The genre is distinguished by its emphasis on atmospheric space, modal harmonies, and what has been described as a "Nordic tone."

== Characteristics ==
The distinctive Nordic jazz sound emerged in the 1960s, influenced significantly by American composer George Russell, who lived in Scandinavia from 1964 to 1969. Russell taught his Lydian Chromatic Concept at Lund University and worked with young Nordic musicians including Jan Garbarek, Terje Rypdal, Arild Andersen, and Jon Christensen, who would become central figures in Nordic jazz.

The establishment of ECM Records in 1969 by German producer Manfred Eicher proved crucial for Nordic jazz's international recognition. Jan Garbarek's "Afric Pepperbird" (1971) became the first Norwegian jazz album on ECM, followed by Keith Jarrett's "Belonging" (1974) featuring Garbarek and other Nordic musicians. These recordings established what became known as the "ECM sound," characterized by spacious production and atmospheric qualities.

Nordic jazz typically employs modal harmonies and minor-based tonality, often incorporating elements from Scandinavian folk music. The style emphasizes space and silence as compositional elements, with long, sustained melodic lines and flexible rhythmic interpretation rather than strict swing.

Production characteristics include extensive use of reverb and emphasis on natural acoustics, creating what critics describe as a "crystalline" or "ethereal" sound quality. The aesthetic has been described as reflecting a "state of being" rather than "state of becoming," distinguishing it from more rhythmically driven jazz styles.

== Notable artists ==
=== Norway ===
Jan Garbarek became the most internationally recognized Nordic jazz artist, with George Russell calling him "just about the most uniquely talented jazz musician Europe has produced since Django Reinhardt." Other significant Norwegian artists include guitarist Terje Rypdal, bassist Arild Andersen, and contemporary musicians like trumpeter Nils Petter Molvær and Arve Henriksen.

=== Sweden ===
Pianist Jan Johansson's album "Jazz på svenska" became the best-selling Swedish jazz recording. Contemporary Swedish artists include pianist Bobo Stenson and the Esbjörn Svensson Trio, which achieved significant international success before Svensson's death in 2008.

=== Denmark ===
Bassist Niels-Henning Ørsted Pedersen won DownBeat's Best Bass Player award in 1981. Contemporary Danish guitarist Jakob Bro continues the ECM tradition with his atmospheric trio recordings.

=== Finland and Iceland ===
Finland has developed a strong jazz infrastructure with artists like saxophonist Timo Lassy and the Ilmiliekki Quartet. Iceland's jazz-fusion band Mezzoforte achieved international success with "Garden Party" (1983).

== Record labels ==
ECM Records remains the most influential label for Nordic jazz, establishing the genre's international sonic template. Norwegian labels include Jazzland Recordings, founded in 1996 by Bugge Wesseltoft, and Hubro Music, established in 2009.

== Festivals ==
The Copenhagen Jazz Festival, established in 1979, is one of Europe's largest jazz festivals with over 1,100 concerts annually. Norway's Molde International Jazz Festival, founded in 1961, is among Europe's oldest jazz festivals. The Stockholm Jazz Festival has been a major Swedish venue since 1980.

== Government support ==
Nordic countries provide substantial government funding for jazz. Norway's Jazz Launch program offers over 1 million kroner for three years of touring support to selected artists. Educational institutions like the Trondheim Jazz Program at NTNU have been instrumental in developing new generations of Nordic jazz musicians.

== See also ==
- European free jazz
- ECM Records
- Modal jazz
- Nordic folk music
