= Asmund Bjørken =

Norwegian folk/jazz musician

- Born: 19 August 1933; Verdal Municipality, Norway
- Died: 29 January 2018 (aged 84) Levanger Municipality, Norway
- Genres: Jazz, traditional music
- Occupations: Musician, composer
- Instruments: Saxophone, bukkehorn
- Label: Sonor Records

Asmund Bjørken (19 August 1933 – 29 January 2018) was a Norwegian musician who played the accordion and saxophone in the genres of jazz and folk. He was self-taught.

== Career ==
Bjørken was part of Harry Waagens Orchestra, a central band on the Trondheim Jazz scene in 1949–53. He later had his own orchestras in Steinkjer (1956–57) and Trondheim (1957–). In the lineups was among others Karl Holst (clarinet and saxophone, 1957–), Kjell Johansen (drums, 1957–) and Bjørn Alterhaug (bass, 1966–). I. 1990 the orchestra consisted of Oddmund Finnseth, Ove Bjørken (guitar), Per Olaf Green and Rolf Skogstad. Foreign collaborators included: Bengt Hallberg, Benny Bailey, Mads Vinding.

In the 1980s he played in Egil Kapstad/Rowland Greenberg Quartet, and since 1990 he has led own Asmund Bjørken Swing Sextet, which inter alia Ove Bjørken, Bjørn Alterhaug and Bjørn Krokfoss are included, as well as Erling Aksdal (piano).

He released the autobiography Spellemann, på gammel rutine og støgg mistanke in 2003, and a portrait of him vas put up at the Norwegian television channel NRK in 2003, called Asmund i Himmelriket, by Andreas Lunnan.

== Honors ==
- 1972: Buddyprisen
- 1998: Nord-Trøndelag fylkes kulturpris
- 2002: Vågåfatet
- 2003: Verdal kommunes kulturpris
- 2004: Trondheim Jazz Festival honorary Award

== Discography ==
=== Solo albums ===
- 1976: Accordeon to my heart
- 1990: Gammeldansens Perler, within 'Asmund Bjørkens Orchestra (Sonor Records)
- 1992: Pot's on, within Asmund Bjørkens Sextet
- 1997: Jazz Accordion – My way, (Sonor Records)

=== Collaborative works ===
- 1979: Frösöminner, (ARC)
- 1981: Old news, within Bjørn Krokfoss Oktet
- 1982: All the things you are, with Arvid Genius

Awards
Preceded by Carl Magnus Neumann	Recipient of the Buddyprisen; 1972	Succeeded by Bjørn Alterhaug
