= 1955 in Norwegian music =

The following is a list of notable events and releases of the year 1955 in Norwegian music.

== Events ==
=== June ===
- 1 – The 3rd Bergen International Festival started in Bergen, Norway (June 1 – 15).

== Deaths ==
October

- 26 – Arne Eggen, composer and organist (born 1881).

== Births ==
January

- 10 – Ole Henrik Giørtz, jazz pianist, arranger and bandleader.

February

- 27 – Terje Tønnesen, violinist.

April

- 19
  - Rolf Løvland, composer and lyricist (Eurovision Song Contest).
  - Rune Klakegg, jazz pianist and composer.

May

- 18 – Kjetil Bjerkestrand, keyboardist, composer, music arranger and record producer.

June

- 7 – Jon Balke, jazz pianist and composer (Magnetic North Orchestra).

July

- 9 – Jan Kåre Hystad, jazz saxophonist (Bergen Big Band).
- 15 – Pål Thowsen, jazz drummer.

October

- 1 – Morten Gunnar Larsen, jazz pianist and composer.

December

- 28 – Yngve Slettholm, composer.

== See also ==
- 1955 in Norway
- Music of Norway
