= 1945 in Norwegian music =

The following is a list of notable events and releases of the year 1945 in Norwegian music.

== Deaths ==
May

- 11 – Edvard Sylou-Creutz, classical pianist, composer and radio personality (born 1881).

July

- 12 – Bjørn Talén, operatic singer (born 1890).

December

- 22 – Johan Austbø, teacher, dancer, poet, composer, and singer (born 1879).

== Births ==
January

- 2 – Terje Bjørklund, jazz pianist and composer.

March

- 19 – Bjørn Moe, orchestra conductor and associate professor at the Norwegian University of Science and Technology.

April

- 1 – Bjørnar Andresen, jazz upright bassist (died 2004).
- 25 – Halvard Kausland, jazz guitarist (died 2017).

June

- 3 – Bjørn Alterhaug, jazz bassist, arranger, composer and Professor of music.
- 27 – Ragnar Søderlind, composer.
- 28 – Magni Wentzel, jazz singer and guitarist.

September

- 2 – Svein Finnerud, jazz pianist, painter and graphic artist (died 2000).
- 16 – Dag Frøland, comedian, singer and variety artist (died 2010).

October

- 5 – Inga Juuso, Sami singer and actress (died 2014).
- 20 – Trond Kverno, contemporary composer.
- 27 – Arild Andersen, jazz upright bassist and composer.

November

- 13 – Knut Riisnæs, jazz saxophonist (died 2023).

== See also ==
- 1945 in Norway
- Music of Norway
