= Roger Arve Vigulf =

Norwegian clarinet soloist and composer (born 1964)

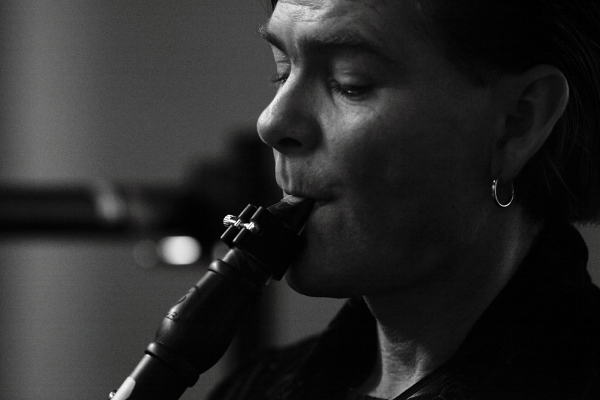
Roger Arve Vigulf

Roger Arve Vigulf (born 9 June 1964 in Spjelkavik) is a Norwegian clarinet soloist and composer. Roger Arve Vigulf holds a Bachelor as clarinetist from the Norwegian Academy of Music, having studied with Richard Kjelstrup. Vigulf has also studied chamber music with Leif Jørgensen and with Lee Morgan in Copenhagen, made possible with a scholarship from Norway's Fund for Performing Artists.

As a soloist, Vigulf has performed more than 100 works from composers such as Hegdal, Nordensten, Lønner, Lang, Martinaitis, Balakauskas and Hundsnes. Vigulf has also been featured as soloist with a number of chamber- and symphony orchestras. As an orchestral musician he has held engagements with The Norwegian Chamber Orchestra, Opera Mobile, The Norwegian Radio Orchestra, Trondheim Symphony Orchestra, Stavanger Symphony Orchestra, Kristiansund Opera, and with three of the Norwegian Armed Forces bands.

Since autumn 1996, Vigulf has also been active as a composer, with his works having seen performances in Lithuania (Lithuania National Philharmonic Hall), Norway (Gamle Logen), Holland (Codarts), Los Angeles (Calstate University ), Irland (Omagh) and England (Sheffield). He has received commissions from MISK, Kattas Figurteater, Disobedient International Chamber Music Festival, Kristiansund Sinfonietta, Tyrunevu Festival, Chordos Quartet and Ålesund strykekvartett. Vigulf has been an ensemble member of the Disobedient Ensemble in Lithuania since 2005 and he also established Ensemble KammerKlang in june 2018 together with composer Bjoern Norvall Hoemsnes. https://www.rogerarvevigulf.com

2006 saw Vigulf being bestowed with Vestfold fylkeskommunes Cultural Scholarship and The Norwegian Society of Soloists travel grant. Vigulf is a member of The Norwegian Society of Soloists, Gramo, Tono and the Norwegian Society of Composers.

== Discography ==
- Julekonsert - Lys i mørket aksjonen OMCD 1002 - Opera Mobile (1993)
- Profiles No.42321 (2000)
- Flucla (2007)
- Mythologie (2010)
- Clarinet Ultimatum MMSCD1213 (2013)
