= 1890 in Norwegian music =

The following is a list of notable events and releases of the year 1890 in Norwegian music.

== Deaths ==
January

- 29 – Johan Didrik Behrens, (born 1820).

== Births ==
April

- 4 – Per Kvist, revue writer, entertainer, stage actor, film actor and children's writer (died 1947).

August

- 5 – Pauline Hall, writer, music critic, and composer (died 1969).

September

- 8 – Bjørn Talén, operatic tenor (died 1945).
- 11 – Marius Ulfrstad, composer, organist and music teacher (died 1968).

October

- 1 – Gunnar Kjeldaas, composer and organist (died 1963).

== See also ==
- 1890 in Norway
- Music of Norway
