= Eth Eonel =

- Eth Eonel performing with Aloysius at 3K Live 2006; Photo by André Kroglund

Background information
- Born: Kenneth Holter; 12 February 1979 (age 47); Larkollen, Østfold, Norway
- Genres: Synthpop, Alternative pop, Avant-rock, Experimental
- Occupations: Musician, recording engineer
- Instruments: Percussion, bass guitar, guitar, keyboards, theremin, vocals
- Years active: 1980s–present
- Label: Eonel Sound
- Website: www.etheonel.net

Kenneth Øvrid Holter (born 12 February 1979), also known as Eth Eonel, is a Norwegian songwriter, producer and singer. He helped form the alternative rock band Aloysius in 2004, and was vocalist for an early line-up of what would later become the progressive metal band Garden Of. He was also one of four thereminists in Trondheim Thereminorkester. From 2008 until 2009 he hosted an experimental radio show called "Fluxusboks", that aired on Radio Revolt. He runs a label called Eonel Sound.

== Early work ==
Eth first came to be known when his vocals were featured on the Monophobe single "Metermind", that gained significant rotation in July 2004 on NRK P3.

Emerging from the "Klubb Kanin" club concept in Trondheim, where he performed under the moniker of Little Horse Deep, Eth provided music for a sound installation at Storåsfestivalen in 2007. The year before he took part in founding Trondheim Thereminorkester, Norway's only theremin orchestra. Historian Ola Nordal, writing in late 2006, dubbed Trondheim Thereminorkester's debut concert "legendary", and during 2007 the ensemble became a prominent part of the Trondheim music scene. In 2008, Eth Eonel played at the Støy På Landet festival, as Little Horse Deep.

== Solo album ==
Eth Eonel's first solo album, Drawing Lines (1989) was released in 2011. It marked the first in a series of albums comprising his compositions from 1989 to the present.^{[a]} The album also made up the main part of a master's degree assignment in Music Technology at the Norwegian University of Science and Technology in Trondheim, in which the main goal was to produce an album "with an 80's sound", but with the means of new technology. While the label simply presented the album as being "alternative pop", as evidenced in his master's degree report, Eth Eonel draws a lot of influence from the 80's synthpop, with elements as well from progressive rock and avant-rock (odd time signatures, fusion of different genres). The album was furthermore mastered by the avant-rock musician and recording engineer Bob Drake.

== Discography ==
- Drawing Lines (1989) – Eth Eonel (2011 • Eonel Sound)
- Fluxusboks: Boks 2008–2013 – Fluxusboks (2013 • Eonel Sound)
- Another Failure (1989) - Eth Eonel (2016 • Eonel Sound)
- Fieldwork 2007-2008 - Trondheim Thereminorkester (2016 • Eonel Sound)

=== Guest appearances ===
- Metermind (EP) – Monophobe (2004 • self-released), vocals on the title track
- Brænderirock – Various Artists (2005 • Brænderi Studio), compilation including two songs by Aloysius
- Alternativ Julekalender – Various Artists (2008), compilation including one track by Trondheim Thereminorkester
- Bob's Drive-In – Bob Drake (2011 • Recommended Records), additional voice on track 11
- Z² – Devin Townsend (2014 • HevyDevy), participant in the Universal Choir

== Notes and references ==
Notes

a. For the extensive list of planned releases in this series, see the Eonel Sound release plan.
