= Bjørn Krokfoss =

Norwegian musician (born 1943)

- Born: 10 August 1943 (age 83); Oslo, Norway
- Genres: Jazz
- Occupations: Musician, composer
- Instrument: Drums
- Website: www.bjornk.com

Bjørn Krokfoss (born 10 August 1943 in Oslo, Norway) is a Norwegian musician (drummer), known from playing within Magnolia Jazzband (1968) og Stokstad/Jensen Trad.Band (1969), Canal Street Jazzband (1976), in Rowland Greenberg's band (1979).

== Biography ==
He established his own Bjørn Krokfoss Swing Octet in Trondheim (1979–) who released the albums Old news (1981) and It don't mean a thing... (1998). The band in 1998 was Asmund Bjørken, Dag Aasen, Helge Førde, Jarle Førde, Kalle Holst, Lasse Hansen, Oddmund Finnseth and Per Olaf Green.

Krokfoss was also central to the establishment of Oslo's first JazzMazz (1979). The Octet released album on the label Talent (1981) and touredin Norway playing at Moldejazz 1981 among others. Krokfoss/Bjørken Quartet was established in 1982. Since 1997 he has participated in the septet «Feetwarmers», and since 2003 he has led the «Tore Stokkan Jazzcafe» at Dickens. He is part of the «Norsk-Svensk Cool Quintet», with Jan Allan, trumpet, Lasse Hörnfeldt, alto saxophone, Erling Aksdal piano, Bjørn Alterhaug bass. John Pål Inderberg on barytone saxophone is a new member of the Cool-band. He also recently attended Asmund Bjørkens sextet on tour. Became a member of Stokstad/Jensen Tradband again (2000–04) and released two albums with Laila Dalseth and Wild Bill Davidson (Herman Records, 2000, 2002). He opened the Jazz café "Kroks-JazzCafe" at Olavs Pub and Spiseri in Trondheim September 2007, started his own Quintet Bjørn Krokfoss Quintet in January 2009 with Bjørn Willadsen at the piano, Svein Væren, on bass, Torstein Siegel on alto saxophone and Knut Rangøy on trumpet. He has worked together with the Swedish singer Gunilla Øberg from Hudiksvall. New trumpeter in his band is Kim Eriksen. Krokfoss received Trondheim municipality culture award for 2012.
