= 1956 in Norwegian music =

The following is a list of notable events and releases of the year 1956 in Norwegian music.

== Events ==
=== May ===
- The 4th Bergen International Festival started in Bergen, Norway.

== Deaths ==
January

- 27 – Harald Heide (79), violinist, conductor, and composer.

December

- 20 – Hildur Andersen (92), pianist and music teacher.

== Births ==
February

- 28 – Jens Wendelboe, jazz trombonist, composer, music arranger and orchestra leader.

April

- 29 – Morgan Lindstrøm, artist, composer, and synthesizer-performer.

June

- 1 – Stephan Barratt-Due, violinist and music teacher.

July

- 19 – Marit Sandvik, jazz singer.

August

- 10 – Lars Martin Myhre, composer, guitarist, pianist, folk singer, and record producer.

September

- 1 – Hilde Hefte, jazz singer, pianist, and composer.

October

- 9 – Geir Langslet, jazz pianist and band leader.
- 23 – Svein Dag Hauge, jazz guitarist and record producer.

September

- 8 – Eivin One Pedersen, jazz accordionist and pianist (died 2012).
- 19 – Eivind Aadland, orchestra conductor and violinist.

November

- 7 – Mikhail Alperin, Ukrainian born jazz pianist, member of the Moscow Art Trio, professor at the Norwegian Academy of Music (died 2018).
- 8 – Mari Boine, Sami singer and yoiker.
- 15 – Maj Britt Andersen, singer.

December

- 3 – Rob Waring, contemporary music composer and performer (drums and vibraphone).
- 9 – Kari Bremnes, singer and songwriter.
- 12 – Geir Holmsen, jazz bassist, music arranger, and composer.

Unknown date

- Kate Augestad, vocalist (Program 81/82).
- Ragnhild Berstad, contemporary composer.

== See also ==
- 1956 in Norway
- Music of Norway
