= Ragnar Sør Olsen =

Norwegian singer and songwriter (born 1951)

Ragnar Sør Olsen (born 7 May 1951) is a Norwegian singer and songwriter.

== Biography ==
The career of Olsen can roughly be divided into three main periods. The first popular and a local singer in the last half of the 60s, the other as jazz musician and singer respectively the Victoria Jazz Band and Roshna Jazz Band, for a total of two decades, and the third as a composer, arranger, lyricist, performer and interpreter of his own and other lyrics. He is filled with musical genes from Telemark, Numedal and Setesdal, where well known fiddlers can be traced in the genus.

Olsen has contributed on a wide range of jazz and folk festivals in Norway and other Nordic countries. He has appeared on NRK, TV and radio, several times (like Children's Hour for the smallest 2001), has toured and been presented on Danmarks Radio, by Palle Aarslev. His collaboration with Bodil Cappelen led to macing tunes to a choice palms by her husband, Olav H. Hauge. He has made music to other poets like Inger Hagerup and Emily Dickinson in a project with Klaus Hagerup. In addition, he put melodies to poems by Olav Flatastøyl, Sigurd Haugsgjerd, Henrik Ibsen, Ragnar Kaasa and Tore Tveit. The latter writer and Olsen has collaborated for 20 years.

== Discography ==
- 2000: Sjøormen Selma (Skau Forlag)
- 2004: Dagane (Nyrenning)
- 2008: Stykkevis Og Helt (Grappa Music)
- 2013: Et Fjell Av Sølv (Grappa Music)
- 2014: Saltvannsfolket (Grappa Music)
