= Rowland Greenberg =

Norwegian jazz trumpeter

- Birth name: Rowland Charles Wentworth Greenberg
- Born: 28 August 1920; Oslo, Norway
- Origin: Norway
- Died: 2 April 1994 (aged 73); Oslo, Norway
- Genres: Jazz
- Occupation(s): Musician, composer
- Instrument: Trumpet

Rowland Charles Wentworth Greenberg (28 August 1920 – 2 April 1994) was a Norwegian jazz musician (trumpet), seen by many as one of the foremost names in Norwegian jazz in the 1940s and 1950s. He was born and died in Oslo.

== Career ==
With a style inspired by the Englishman Nat Gonella, he guested in 1938 in leading orchestras such as Hot Dogs and Funny Boys. Before his musical career, he was also one of the country's leading cyclists. As a member of SK Rye, he was Oslo champion in 1937 in the 1000 metres track cycling and 20 km road cycling. The following year, he won the team championships at the junior National Championships in 20 km road cycling.

After trips to England (1938–39) with Vic Lewis and George Shearing, he was a central part of Oslo's swing-jazz milieu, where he led his own Rowland Greenberg Swing Band (1939–41) with Arvid Gram Paulsen on sax, Lulle Kristoffersen on piano, and Pete Brown on drums. He also led his Rowland Greenberg Rytmeorkester (1940–44), with Gordon Franklin on tenor sax, Arvid Gram Paulsen on alto sax, Robert Normann on guitar, Kjell Bjørnstad, Frank Hansen, Lyder Vengbo on trombone, and Fred Lange-Nielsen on bass. A record release (1942) was banned by the German regime, and he was jailed for breaching the Rytmeklubbforbundet by viewing jazz films (1943).

After his release from Grini, he was also active in Sweden (with Cecil Aagaard, Thore Ehrling, and Malte Johnson) and England (with Jimmie Woode and Sam Samson). He also toured Norway with his own band (1948–50), including presenting bebop to the country. Greenberg took part in the "All-Star Trumpets session" (Paris Jazz Festival, 1949) with Miles Davis, Bill Coleman, Jimmy McPartland and Aime Barelli. Greenberg also played with Charlie Parker who joined Greenberg in his Sweden tour band (1950), along with Louis Armstrong (1952), and Down Beat, who gave Greenberg the first chart placing of his career. During the 1950s, he played extensively in the orchestras led by Egil Monn-Iversen, Leiv Flisnes and Terje Kjær. He led his own orchestras including Mikkel Flagstad on piano, Totti Bergh on saxophone, Knut Young on bass, Ivar Wefring on piano, Bjørn Krokfoss on drums (until 1981), and played with Ben Webster (Moldejazz, 1969) and Teddy Wilson.

== Awards ==
- The first Buddyprisen, 1956
- Gammleng-prisen veteran class, 1989

== Discography ==
- Rowland Greenberg and his Group, Swing is the thing. EMI/Columbia Records. 1970.
- How about you?. Oslo, Norway: Gemini Records. 1987. OCLC 30092116.
  with Kristian Bergheim saxophone, Eivin Sannes piano, Sture Janson bass, and Per Nyhaug drums.
- Rowland Greenberg Portrait of a Norwegian jazz artist, Vettre: Gemini Records, 2001, OCLC 935380659

Awards
Preceded by First award in 1967	Recipient of the Buddyprisen; 1967	Succeeded by Arvid Gram Paulsen
Preceded by Erik Bye	Recipient of the Veteran class Gammleng-prisen; 1989	Succeeded by Egil Monn-Iversen
