= Arvid Gram Paulsen =

Norwegian jazz musician and composer

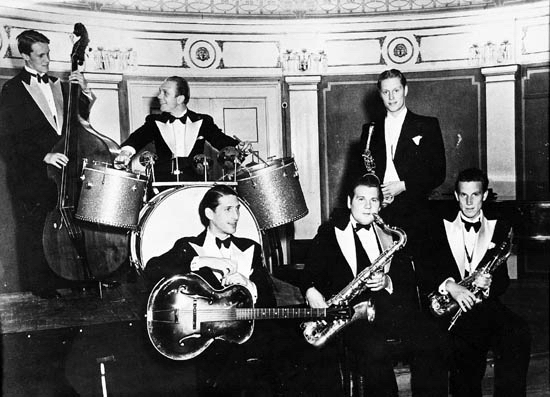
- Gram Paulsen with Svein Øvergaards Orchestra, Oslo, 1939. Gram Paulsen is no. 3 from the right.

Background information
- Also known as: «Pål»
- Born: 4 January 1922; Oslo
- Origin: Norway
- Died: 11 April 1963 (aged 41)
- Occupation: Musician
- Instruments: Tenor saxophone, alto saxophone, trumpet
- Label: Gemini Music

Arvid Gram Paulsen (born 4 January 1922 – 11 April 1963) was a Norwegian jazz musician (saxophone and trumpet) and composer.

== Biography ==
Gram Paulsen was born in Kristiania, and joined the orchestra at Oslo Swingklubb, and a new quartet with Lulle Kristoffersen and Pete Brown, under the leadership of Rowland Greenberg (1940). Beyond the 1940s, he joined the studio band of Syv Muntre, and various ensembles led by Svein Øvergaard, Rowland Greenberg, Willie Vieth, Jens Book-Jensen, Alf Søgaard, Pete Iwers and Finn Westbye. By Kurios record contributions may be mentioned that during World War II in conjunction with Alf Søgaard, contributed to Kari Diesen's album Problemet/Minorka (1942). In the 1950s he played within Pete Brown's Orchestra and led his own bands. Before he died he performed at the Moldejazz in 1962.

== Honors ==
- 1957: Buddyprisen

== Discography ==
- 2001: Portrait of a norwegian jazz artist – Arvid Gram Paulsen (Gemini Records)

Awards
Preceded by Rowland Greenberg	Recipient of the Buddyprisen; 1957	Succeeded by Einar Iversen
