= Ruth Olina Lødemel =

- Born: 18 May 1966 (age 59); Volda, Sunnmøre, Møre og Romsdal
- Origin: Norway
- Genres: Classical music
- Occupation(s): Musician, composer, dancer, actor
- Instrument: Soprano
- Website: www.rutholinaloedemel.org

Ruth Olina Lødemel (born 18 May 1966 in Volda, Norway) is a Norwegian soprano, dancer, actor and composer.

== Career ==
After finishing her Examen artium at "Atlanten videregående skole" (1983–86), Lødemel has studied singing and vocal pedagogy. She is a graduate of Norwegian Academy of Music (1986), Barratt Due Institute of Music (1991), and Høgskulen i Volda (2014). In 2013, Lødemel traveled around with the play "Ervingen" in connection with "Språkåret", a musical play where Lødemel performed her own music together with the guitarist Øystein Dahle Egset.

== Discography ==
- 2003: Mellom Tusen Bakkar, album with Lødemes's own melodies to Ivar Aasen lyrics
- 2016: Romsdalseggen, Hyllest Til Romsdal Og Andre Perler
