= Elling Enger =

Norwegian musician (1905–1979)

Elling Enger (22 February 1905 – 28 January 1979) was a Norwegian composer, organist, and choir conductor.

== Biography ==
Enger was born in Skotfoss, Norway, and got his musical educated at the Conservatory of Music in Oslo. He worked as organist in Tromsø (1930–36), and later as organist and choir conductor in Oslo. He has written the song "Bli med, bli med til livet!" ("Join, join in to life!"), as well as cantatas, orchestra pieces, motets, organ works, and the like.
