= Bjørn Boysen =

Norwegian organist and educator

- Born: 3 December 1943; Oslo, Norway
- Died: 30 January 2018 (aged 74); Oslo
- Education: Oslo Conservatory of Music
- Occupations: organist and educator

Bjørn Boysen (3 December 1943 – 30 January 2018) was a Norwegian organist and educator. He was born in Oslo, and studied at the Oslo Conservatory of Music with Arild Sandvold, and in Copenhagen with Finn Viderø. He made his concert debut in Oslo in 1966, held concerts in several European countries, and recorded a number of albums. He was assigned teacher at the Oslo Conservatory from 1967 to 1973. He was appointed professor at the Norwegian Academy of Music, and served as rector from 1991 to 1998. Boysen was also involved in conservation and restoration of church organs from the 18th century.
