= Peder Gram =

Danish composer and organist

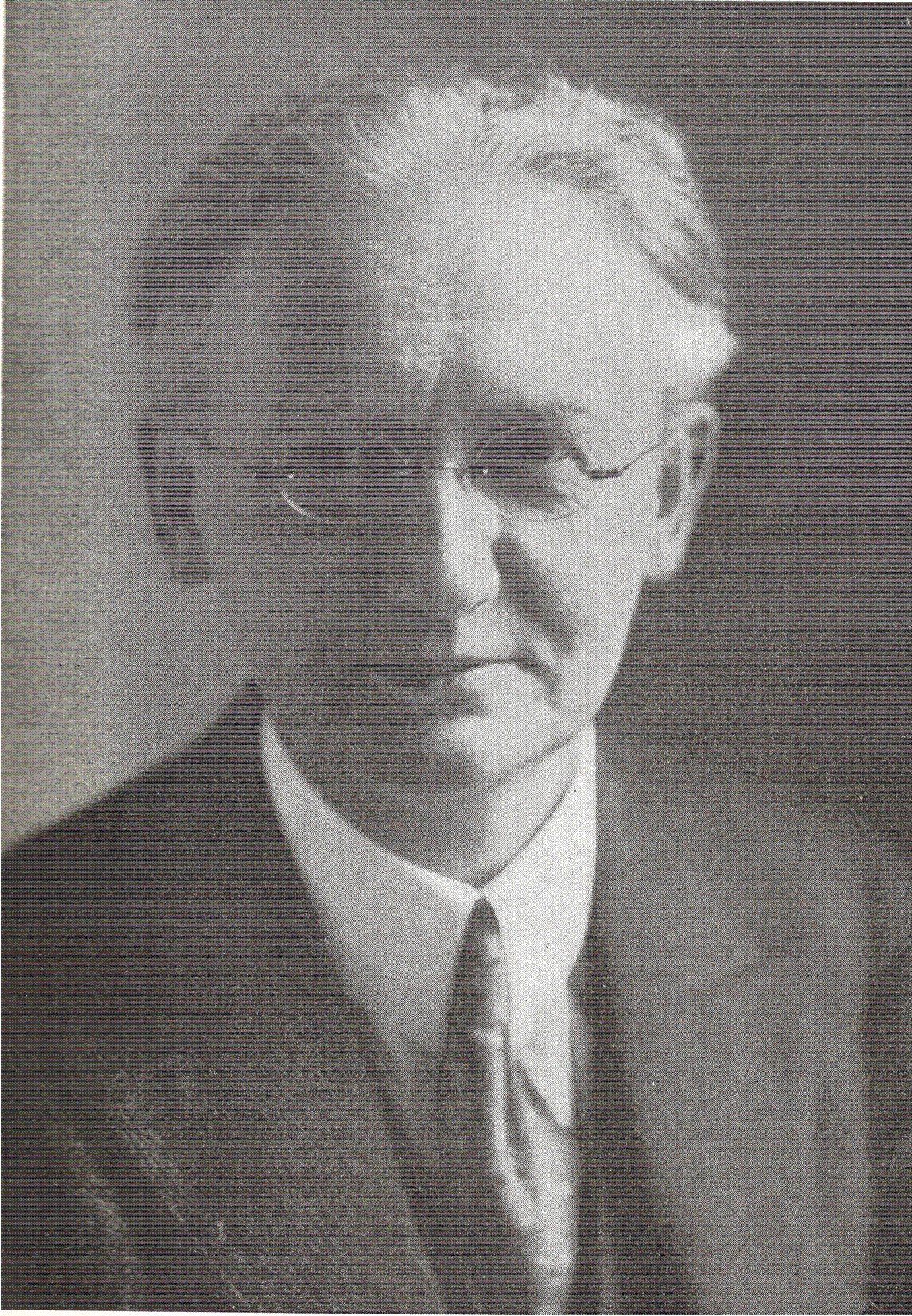
Gram, before 1946

Peter Jørgensen Gram (25 November 1881 – 4 February 1956) was a Danish composer and organist.

== Life ==
Gram was born in Copenhagen and studied at the Leipzig Conservatory under Stephan Krehl, Arthur Nikisch and Hans Sitt. From 1908, he worked as a conductor in Copenhagen, and from 1918 to 1932, he led the performances of the Dansk Koncertforening. From 1937 to 1951 he was Director of Music at the Danish Broadcasting Corporation.

He composed three symphonies, a symphonic fantasy, a tone poem, two overtures, a violin concerto, chamber works, piano works and songs.

== Works ==
=== Orchestral ===
- Romance No. 1 for Orchestra, Op. 2
- Romance No. 2 for Orchestra, Op. 5 (1914)
- Symphonic Fantasy, Op. 7 (1909)
- Poème lyrique for orchestra, Op. 9 (1911)
- Festive Overture, Op. 10
- Symphony No. 1, Op. 12 (1914)
- Avalon, Orchestral song for soprano and orchestra, Op. 16 (1916)
- Violin Concerto in D major, Op. 20 (1919)
- Overture in C major, Op. 21 (1921)
- Min Ungdoms Drøm for tenor and orchestra or piano, Op. 22
- Marionet Music for Orchestra, Op. 24
- Symphony No. 2 for soprano and orchestra, Op. 25 (1926)
- Prologue to a Drama by Shakespeare for orchestra, Op. 27 (1928)
- Suite de Ballet, Op. 32 (1945)
- Symphony No. 3, Op. 35 (1955)

=== Chamber music ===
- String Quartet No. 1, Op. 3 (1907)
- Piano Trio, Op. 6 (1910)
- Canzonetta for violin and piano, Op. 19
- Serenade for String Quartet on two Canadian folk melodies, Op. 26 (1927)
- Pastorale and Capriccio for oboe and piano, Op. 29
- String Quartet No. 3, Op. 30
- Wind Quintet, Op. 31 (1943)

=== Solo instruments ===
- Bagatelles for Piano, Op. 8
- Romance for Piano, Op. 8a
- Introduction and Fugue, Op. 13
- Piano Sonata, Op. 14 (1913)
- Variations on a theme by Peter Weyse for piano, Op. 15 (1915)

=== Voice ===
- 3 Songs, Op. 1
- Songs, Op. 4 (1906)
- 4 Songs, Op. 11 (1911)
- 3 Songs for Men's Chorus, Op. 17
- Three Danish Poems for female chorus, Op. 23
- Intrada Seria, Op. 34 (1946)
