= Cally Monrad =

Norwegian singer, actress and poet

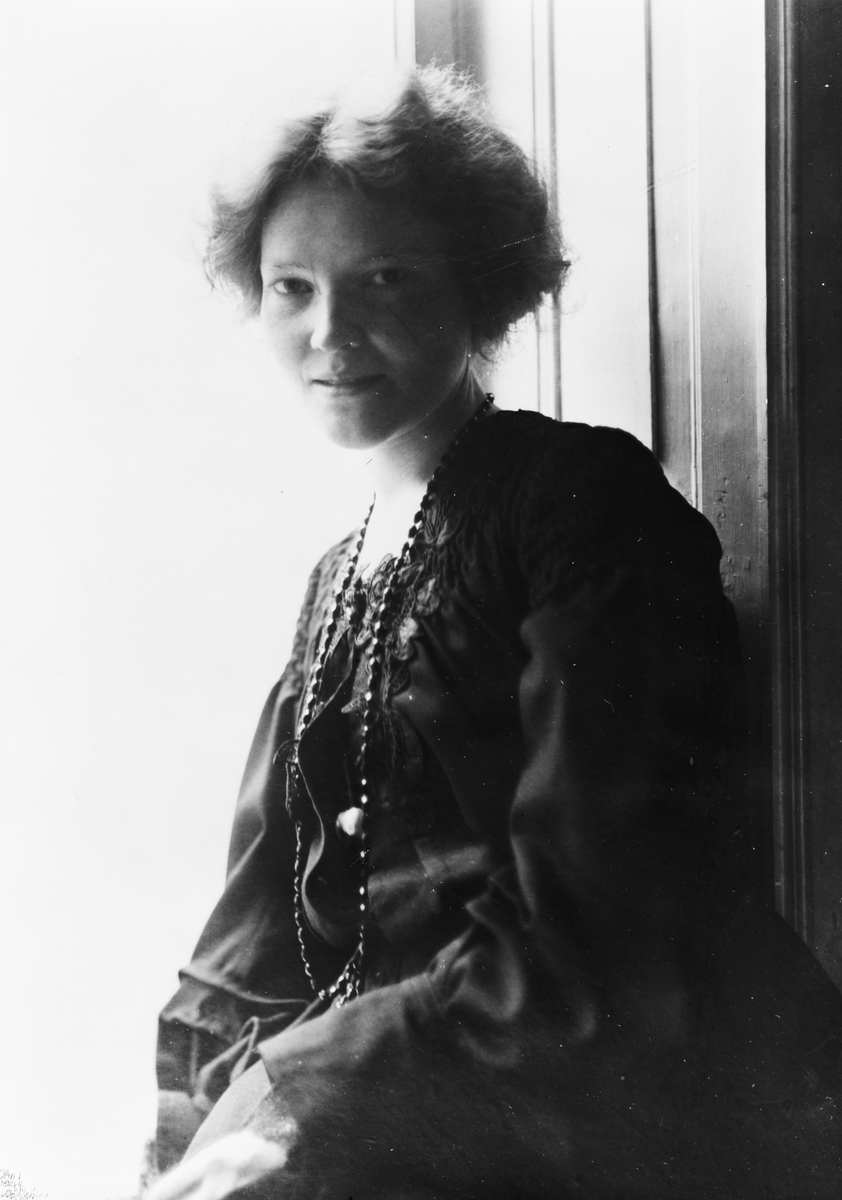
Cally Monrad

Ragnhild Caroline Monrad (31 July 1879 – 23 February 1950) was a Norwegian singer, actress and poet. She was born in Gran Municipality, studied singing in Dresden, stayed in Berlin for a long time, toured with Edvard Grieg, and performed for King Oscar II, Haakon VII and Emperor William II. She was a very popular opera singer in Norway, Sweden, Denmark and Germany.

She ended up as a member of the Nazi Party Nasjonal Samling, and was theatre director at Det Norske Teatret from 1942 to 1945, during the German occupation of Norway.

She was sentenced to one year imprisonment in 1947.

Cally Monrad was the sister of the painter Julie Gjessing (born Julie Monrad).

Cultural offices
Preceded by Knut Hergel	Director of the Det Norske Teatret; 1942–1945	Succeeded by Knut Hergel
