= Narvik Winter Festival =

Norwegian festival

Narvik Winter Festival, in Norwegian just Vinterfestuka (The Winter Festival Week), is an annual cultural festival with railway history platform in Narvik. It is based on stories, myths and facts from the construction time of the Narvik and Kiruna railway system around 1900.

Important symbols for the Narvik Winter Festival are the rallars, railway worker rallaren, Svarta Bjorn (Black Bear) and the Ofotbanen.

The Narvik Winter Festival has a special position in the local population, as a large part of the city's population has its own outfits worn during the festival. For men, there is black trousers and fluffy flanell shirt with black or dark vest and racket hat that applies to everyday, for party it is the same outfit but with white shirt. For the ladies, it's a long skirt with blouse (often white / light gray or reddish / purple) and black shawl that's everyday attire while evening dress is used for partying. This tradition has in recent years had a marked increase in popularity also among youth.

Den Stolte og Ærverdige Rallarklubben av Malmbyen Narvik (The Proud and Honorable Ralilway Workers Club of the Malm Sity of Narvik) is also an important contributor, with its events during the Narvik Winter Festival and otherwise in the year.

== History ==
The Narvik Winter Festival is organized annually in March, the first time in 1956 as a «French festival». In 1957 the event was called Festival Narvik. Today the festival, with around 200 events, attract a total of about 30,000 visitors.

The festival was initially run by Narvik Reiselivslag (travelers organization), but the size of the arrangements made another organization necessary. The Narvik Winter Festival became its own foundation in 1997, called the Stiftelsen Vinterfestuka (The Vinterfestuka Foundation). The reason was to get a more independent organization that could carry out the events "The Narvik Winter Festival", "Folkefest i Rombaksbotn" and help develop new arrangements. Today, the foundation for the implementation of the cultural events "The Narvik Winter Festival", "Folkefest i Rombaksbotn" and a number of other events throughout the year.

The 2020 Winter Festival was canceled by Narvik due to the coronavirus pandemic.
