= DølaJazz =

Annual Norwegian music event

Dølajazz is a Norwegian jazz festival held at Lillehammer in October each year. The festival was established in 1977 and first held in 1978.

In its first year, the festival was the fourth largest Norwegian jazz festival after Moldejazz, Kongsberg Jazzfestival and Vossajazz. The founders were Kyrre Rosenvinge and Roger Ryberg.

DølaJazz has focused on both developing talent and the best of Norwegian jazz, and instituted Norsk Jazzstipend (The Norwegian Jazz Scholarship) in partnership with Norsk Jazzforbund (The Norwegian Jazz Federation) and Foreningen Norske Jazzmusikere (The Association of Norwegian Jazz Musicians). The festival will perform an annual commission, which is now christened Homecoming.

Past commissions include:

- Arild Andersen From Winter Poems for adventure, memorial concert for Radka Toneff (1984)
- Bjørn M. Kjærnes/Anne Karin Elstad message of peace (1986)
- Morten Halle (1996)
- Gaute Solås' «Sound of youth» (1998)
- Stian Carstensen (1999)
- Ståle Storløkken with improvised church music (2000)

Other composers of commissioned works: Frode Thingnæs, Øivind Pedersen, Helge Hurum, John Surman, Torgrim Sollid/Morten Lassem

In 2011 Carol and Thor Kvande was the hosts of Homecoming.

Since 2001, the project «Jazz Incubator» has been steady, in cooperation with Høgskolen i Lillehammer and various music conservatories in Scandinavia, with the aim to introduce Nordic jazz talents and to provide training in cultural production. In recent years, it established a European jazz incubator.
