= Knut Borge =

Norwegian journalist and entertainer (1949-2017)

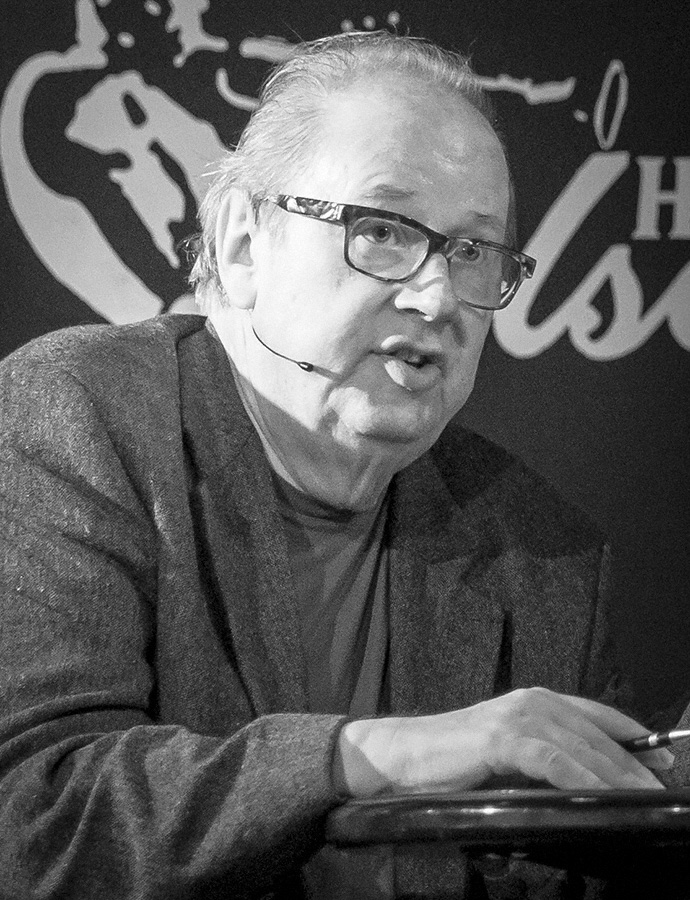
- From a 2016 recording of the radio show Studio Sokrates
- Born: 2 September 1949; Bærum, Norway
- Died: 9 April 2017 (aged 67); Oslo, Norway
- Occupations: Journalist; Entertainer

Knut Conrad Borge (2 September 1949 – 9 April 2017) was a Norwegian journalist and entertainer.

== Career ==
Borge came from Bærum, and took upper secondary education with emphasis on economic subjects at Nadderud Upper Secondary School. He became a freelancer for the Norwegian Broadcasting Corporation in 1973.

Among his shows were Borgulfsen, with Torkjell Berulfsen from 1984 to 1997, and Swing&Sweet, with Leif "Smoke Rings" Anderson from 1986 to 1999. He hosted the Spellemannprisen show several times.

From 2004 onward, he hosted a relaunch of the classical quiz show 20 spørsmål, which attained up to more than a million viewers. He worked as a jazz columnist and journalist for Verdens Gang from 1979-89, and for Dagens Næringsliv from 1990-95. His books include Det største siden Svartedauen from 1986, and Kjære Skrythals from 1994 (with Tore Skoglund).

Borge died on 9 April 2017, aged 67.

== Personal life ==
Borge was born in Bærum on 2 September 1949. He was married to journalist Tone Gammelgaard until her death in 2004.

== Awards ==
Borge was awarded the Molderosen at the Moldejazz festival in 1982. He was awarded the Lytterprisen from Riksmålsforbundet in 1996.
