= Sigurd Islandsmoen =

Norwegian composer (1881–1964)

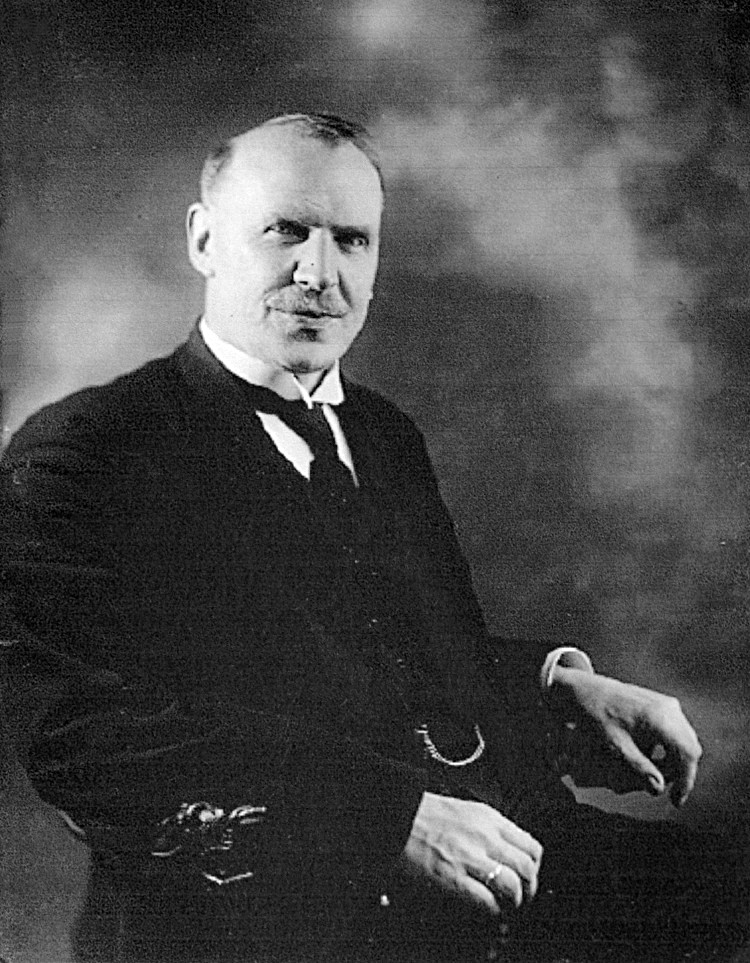
Sigurd Islandsmoen

Sigurd Islandsmoen (August 27, 1881 – July 1, 1964) was a Norwegian composer. Sigurd Islandsmoen made significant contributions to the music of the Church of Norway. In all he wrote some 70 opuses, among these five feature-length works for orchestra, choir and soloists. He is perhaps best known for his composition Requiem written between 1935 and 1936 and first premiered in 1943.

== Background ==
Sigurd Islandsmoen was born in Bagn (Sør-Aurdal Municipality), in Oppland county, Norway. He grew up on the family farm, the youngest of nine siblings. He was the brother of Norwegian educator and politician, Olaus Islandsmoen. He studied at the music academy of Oslo, later as well in Leipzig, where amongst others Max Reger was his teacher. The time in Leipzig is believed to have had a great influence on his musical development, and especially the organist Karl Straube (1873–1950) and conductor Arthur Nikisch (1855–1922).

He took an exam at Elverum Teacher Academy in 1904 and worked as a teacher from 1904 to 1916. First he worked as a teacher and organist for some years in his home village of Bagn, and later he worked for the six years as music teacher in Gjøvik. From 1916 to 1961 he was church organist in Moss. Through his position as organist at Moss, he made a great effort for the city's musical life. He initiated the formation of Moss Orchestra Association in 1924 and served as conductor for a long series of years. He was also the leader of several local choir and bands as well.

== Career ==
He composed numerous oratorios and orchestral works, chamber music, piano, organ and choir works. Perhaps his most popular work is the song Det lysnet i skogen with lyrics by Jørgen Moe. Other notable pieces include Requiem (premiered in 1943), an opera – Gudrun Laugar, two symphonies, oratorios, Israel i fangenskap (premiered in 1931) and Heimat frå Babel (first performed in 1934), the choral work Missa solemnis (premiered in 1954), two symphonies, Norsk Ouvertyre and other orchestral works, chamber music, piano and organ works and a number of choral works.

Islandsmoen was knighted by First Class of the Royal Norwegian Order of St. Olav and from 1952 received a Government artist salary. Bagn Bygdesamling, a small museum on the home farm at Sør-Aurdal, created by Islandsmoen's brother Olaus, contains an exhibition of the composer's work.

A teacher at Oslo Conservatory of Music, his students include Bjørn Fongaard.

== Selected works ==
- Norsk Ouvertyre, (1913)
- Israel i fangenskap, (1931)
- Heimatt frå Babel, (1934)
- Requiem, (1943)
- Missa Solemnis, (1954)
- Missa Nidrosiense, (1963)
- Gudrun Laugar, (1964)
