= Arne Eggen =

Norwegian composer and organist

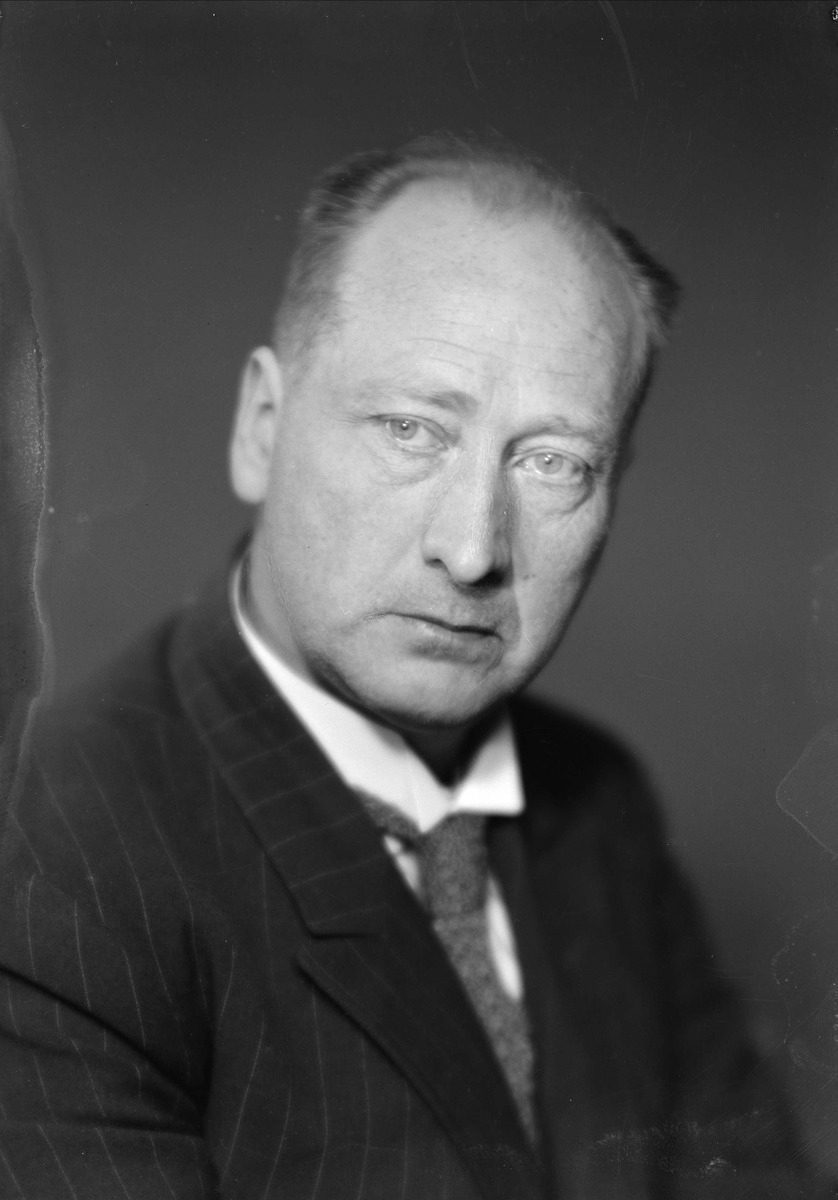
- Arne Eggen in 1927.

Background information
- Born: 28 August 1881; Trondheim, Sør-Trøndelag
- Origin: Norway
- Died: 26 October 1955 (aged 74) Bærum, Akershus
- Genres: Classical, church music
- Occupations: Musician, composer
- Instrument: Church organ

Arne Eggen (28 August 1881 in Trondheim, Norway – 26 October 1955 in Bærum, Norway) was a Norwegian composer and organist, married in 1916 to Engel Johanne Othilie Sparre Gulbranson (1878–1918), the brother of musicologist and composer Erik Eggen (1877–1957), and brother-in-law to the opera singer Ellen Gulbranson (1863–1947).

== Biography ==
Eggen studied at the Conservatory of Music in Oslo with Catharinus Elling (1858–1942) and Peter Brynie Lindeman (1858–1930), and graduated as organist in 1905. He also studied at the Leipzig Conservatory (1906–1907) with Stephan Krehl and Karl Straube (1873–1950). He worked as organist in Bragernes Church (1908–1924), Drammen Church (1908–1924), Bryn Church (1924–1955) and Tanum Church, Bærum. He was chairman of the Norwegian Society of Composers (1927–1945), Honorary Chairman 1945 in TONO 1928–1930. Of his compositions include Oratorio King Olav (1930), the operas Olav Liljekrans (lyrics by Ibsen, 1931–1940) and Cymbelin (lyrics by Shakespeare, 1943–1950), premiered in 1951, with Aase Nordmo Løvberg in the role of Imogen, the choral Mjøsen (mixed choir with piano, 1922), the melodrama Liti Kersti, Cantata to Drammens 100th anniversary (soli, choir and orchestra), music to Liti Kjersti (1915), Symphony in G minor (1920), 2 violin sonatas, cello sonatas, organ works (Ciaconna) and a numerous romances. Stylistically Eggen continued Grieg and Svendsen's national romantic line, and he has been particularly known for his great ability to create beautiful melodies.

He died at Bærum Hospital.

== Works ==
- Cymbelin, opera after Shakespeare, 1943–1948

== Recordings ==
The orchestral work Bjørgulv spelemann (Liti Kersti-suite) ("Bjorgulv the Fiddler") was recorded by the Oslo Philharmonic under conductor Odd Grüner-Hegge in 1951, and again by the Iceland Symphony Orchestra. The psalm-hymn "Ære det evige forår i livet" ("Praise the eternal spring of life") to a text by Bjørnstjerne Bjørnson, was recorded by Kirsten Flagstad with the London Symphony Orchestra, conducted by Øivin Fjeldstad.
