= Tourniquet (disambiguation) =

Tourniquet may refer to:

- Tourniquet, a medical device used to control blood flow to an extremity:
  - Surgical tourniquet, a specialised surgical tool
  - Emergency tourniquet, used to stop blood loss in an emergency
  - Hair tourniquet, a condition often requiring medical attention
- Tourniquet test

== Music ==
- Tourniquet (band), an American Christian metal band
- Tourniquet (album), a 2001 album by Larry Norman
- The Tourniquet, a 2005 album by Magnet
- "Tourniquet" (Breaking Benjamin song), 2017
- "Tourniquet" (Marilyn Manson song), 1997
- "Tourniquet", a song by Baroness from Gold & Grey, 2019
- "Tourniquet", a song by the Creatures from Hái!, 2003
- "Tourniquet", a song by Ensign from Direction of Things to Come, 1997
- "Tourniquet", a song by Evanescence from Fallen, 2003
- "Tourniquet", a song by Headswim from Despite Yourself, 1997
- "Tourniquet", a song by Jeremy Messersmith, 2013
- "Tourniquet", a song by Knife Party from 100% No Modern Talking, 2011
- "Tourniquet", a song by Meg Myers from Take Me to the Disco, 2018
- "Tourniquet", a song by Owen from The King of Whys, 2016
- "Tourniquet", a song by Slowthai from Ugly, 2023
- "Tourniquet", a song by Ten from The Twilight Chronicles, 2006
- "Tourniquet", a song by Tesseract from Polaris, 2015
- "Tourniquet (Cynthia Ann)", a song by Chrissie Hynde from Stockholm, 2014
- "Tourniquet", a song by Zach Bryan from Zach Bryan, 2023
