= Chocolate Overdose =

Norwegian band

- Origin: Bergen, Norway
- Genres: Alternative rock, pop music
- Years active: 1991 –
- Labels: Rune Grammofon
- Members: Geir Luedy; Paal Andersen; Bjørn Ivar Tysse; Mats Egil Grønner; Frode Unneland
- Past members: Even "Magnet" Johansen

Chocolate Overdose (initiated 1991 in Bergen, Norway) is a pop oriented rock band.

== Biography ==
The band was started by the four musicians who originally was backing band for songwriter and singer Eduardo «Doddo» Andersen in his project Unge Frustrerte Menn. They were Geir Luedy (vocals and brother of Eduardo), Paal Andersen (keyboards, not brother of Eduardo), Frode Unneland (drums, vocals) and Even Johansen (guitar) later known as Magnet. The band lineup was finally completed when bassist and producer Bjørn Ivar Tysse joined in. He had previously played with Luedy in the band Forbidden Colours. Luedy was former bassist in the band MonaLisa Overdrive, later known as Barbie Bones, while Unneland and Tysse had been rhythm section in The Rub and Pompel and the Pilts. Johansen and Andersen also had experience within various Bergen bands. Chocolate Overdose was a part of the so-called Bergen Wave early 1990s. The band got a record contract with Warner Music, and made their international debut at the Glastonbury Festival 1992. This was the first time a Norwegian played at this festival, in front of 15.000 spectators, and Ole-Petter Dronen organized it all for them.

Their debut album Everybody Likes Chocolate (1992) was no great success, and Warner connected the band with Swedish star producer Michael Ihlbert, and the second album Sugar Baby became more of a success, as an open and accessible record, with guest performances by artists like Sonya Aurora Madan of Echobelly, PapaDee and Geir Sundstøl. The great sales failed, and Chocolate Overdose was suspended from the contract with Warner.

Johansen then moved to London, where he initiated the band Libido. He was replaced by the guitarist Mats Grønner, and the band went on as Unge Frustrerte Menn. At this poit Unneland joined in the band Savoy. Chocolate Overdose managed to record two full albums with Doddo before releasing something on their own. Whatever was first released in the United States and Canada in 1997 on the label Bar None, while the Norwegian fans had to wait until the spring of 1998, when a contract with Rune Grammofon was signed.

The next album was produced by the band, and included guest musicians like Hildegunn Solbø (vocals), Per Jørgensen (trumpet) and Stein Inge Brækhus (drums). The fourth album Dingledoodies, was released the year after, and stood out as the most complete album style-wise. Anders Marius Bortne collaborated as co-vocalist on the track «Lou and Lee». The author Aksel Fugelli wrote lyrics for the band, and he and Luedy acted as a duo under the name Lou and Lee.

== Band members ==
Present members

- Geir Luedy Andersen - vocals (1991 - )
- Paal Andersen - keyboards (1991 - )
- Bjørn Ivar Tysse - bass, backing vocals (1991 - )
- Frode Unneland - drums, vocals (1991 - )
- Mats Egil Grønner - guitar, vocals, drums (1997 - )

Past members

- Even "Magnet" Johansen - guitar, backing vocals (1991 - 1995)

== Discography ==
- 1992: Everybody Likes Chocolate (WEA)
- 1993: Sugar Baby (WEA)
- 1997: Whatever (Bar None)
- 1999: Dingledoodies (Rune Grammofon)
