= Aksel Fugelli =

Norwegian novelist

Aksel Fugelli (born 1968) is a Norwegian novelist.

In the early 1990s he issued the novels Rock rundt klokka (1990), Fribrev (1992), Under en lilla måne (1992) and Papegøyens hevn (1994) and the young adult fiction book Øye for øye (1993). After making a literary comeback with the non-fiction book Per. Glimt av min far about his father Per Fugelli in 2014, Aksel Fugelli published another novel Tøffe tider for gentlemen in 2015 through Cappelen Damm. He also wrote song lyrics for groups like Unge Frustrerte Menn and Geir Luedy and Hans Petter Aaserud's project Rangle.

Aksel Fugelli grew up in several locations in Norway, last in Bergen. After finishing his secondary education at Fana Gymnas, he enrolled at the University of Bergen, but suddenly dropped out to migrate to Brazil for an indeterminate period. He used these experiences in writing both Rock rundt klokka and Under en lilla måne.

== Reception ==
=== Papegøyens hevn ===
Papegøyens hevn, issued on Cappelen, was reviewed in Norway's major newspapers. It was a meta-novel about a manuscript also called Papegøyens hevn (English: Revenge of the Parrot), about a married couple and a parrot, written anonymously and issued by Cappelen. After the book won a Brage Prize, "Aksel Fugelli" fraudulently came forward as its author. Part of the novel's purpose was to satirize the Norwegian book publishing business and literary critics.

The initial criticisms stemmed from Bergen, where Bergens Tidende called the book "grotesque" and with an "anal fixation". Bergensavisen called it "nauseating" and issued the mediocre "die throw" 3 out of 6. Adresseavisen rounded off the initial wave of reviews, calling the novel a "Bloviated provocation": "The novel asks for trouble, but in such a bloviated and nonchalant, easy-going way that there is little to arouse trouble for". On the other hand, all three critics found good formulations here and there.

Next, Nordlys published a positive criticism: "His [Fugelli's] language is devil-may-care, raw, deliciously nutty, with a rare degree of power and drive". Much of the same was to be found in the review of another regional newspaper Fædrelandsvennen. The novel fared worse in the Oslo newspapers Dagbladet and VG, with the former calling it "empty", "strange", "half-hearted" and "dumb" and the latter calling it "mean" (and issuing a "die throw" of 2). Both Aftenposten and the smaller Sandefjords Blad regarded novel as a "weak" effort from an otherwise skilled writer. Unlike previous reviews, these newspapers disclosed that some of the grotesque and provoking scenes were descriptions of animal cruelty.

=== Tøffe tider for gentlemen ===
The phrase Tøffe tider for gentlemen (English: Tough Times for Gentlemen) was used in 2001 in conjunction with the music project Rangle. It too had several autobiographic elements, describing Bergen youth of the 1990s, as well as an infamous instance when a live penguin was stolen from the Bergen Aquarium. The book got a mediocre review in Bergens Tidende, issuing 3 out of 6 points, adding that sex scenes in the book were on par with those receiving a Bad Sex in Fiction Award. Stavanger Aftenblad however gave a favorable "die throw" of 5, regarding the characters and the "sketch-like" plot as easy-going and fun.
