= Cry room =

Secluded area for children and caregivers

A cry room, crying room, or infant care room is a space designed for people to take babies or small children for privacy or to reduce disturbance of others. Started in the 1950s, they are usually found in churches, theatres, and cinemas. Cry rooms are often designed with soundproofing properties to dampen the sounds made within. Many are equipped with a speaker system to allow the occupants to continue listening to the presentation in the main space, be it a church service or performance in a theatre.

Some churches have cry rooms for when a child becomes "out of control, disruptive enough to distract people, or makes it hard for others to hear or contemplate". Cry rooms are used in theatres and cinemas to allow a child to be taken out of the main auditorium while still allowing the accompanying adult to watch the performance.

Cry rooms are disappearing in many places, particularly in cinemas, mainly due to the rise of multiplex theaters beginning in the 1970s.

== See also ==
- Infant crying
