= On Your Side =

On Your Side may refer to:

== Albums ==
- On Your Side (A Rocket to the Moon album) or the title song, 2009
- On Your Side (Gerald Walker album) or the title song, 2011
- On Your Side (Magnet album) or the title song, 2003
- On Your Side (EP) or the title song, by Cheerleader, 2014
- On Your Side EP, by Jacques Greene, 2013

== Songs ==
- "On Your Side" (The Veronicas song), 2016
- "On Your Side", by Goo Goo Dolls from Hold Me Up, 1990
- "On Your Side", by the Innocence Mission from See You Tomorrow, 2020
- "On Your Side", by Koda Kumi from Bon Voyage, 2014
- "On Your Side", by Lange, 2015
- "On Your Side", by Luna Halo from their 2007 self-titled album
- "On Your Side", by Mary Milne
- "On Your Side", by Pete Yorn from Musicforthemorningafter, 2001
- "On Your Side", by Superfly from White, 2015
- "On Your Side", by Thriving Ivory from Through Yourself & Back Again, 2010

== See also ==
- Tarafdaar (lit. On your side), a 2012 album by Shadmehr Aghili
