= Infant crying =

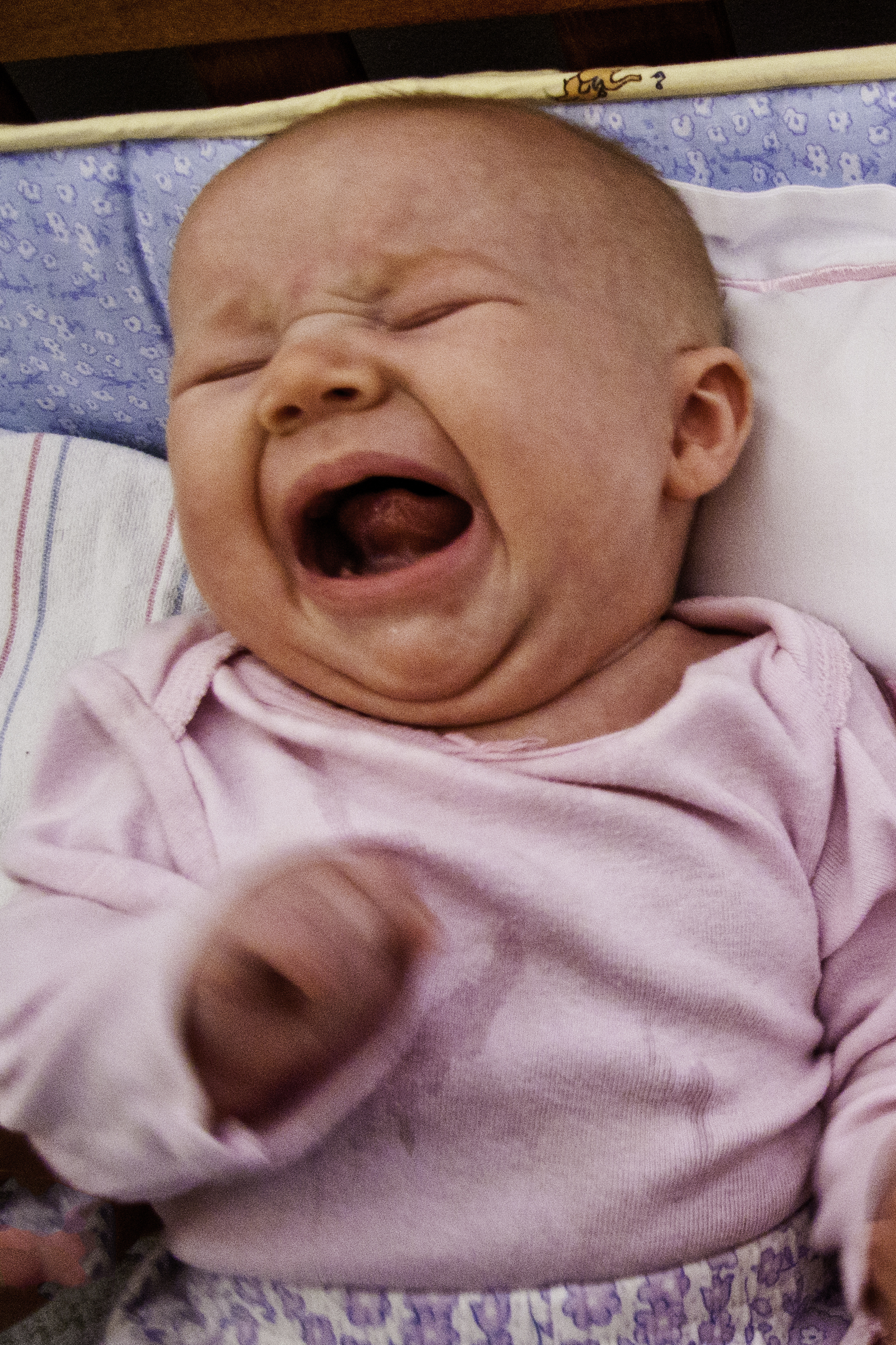
- An infant crying
- Specialty: Pediatrics
- Symptoms: Crying for three or more hours per 24 hours
- Complications: Parental sleep deprivation
- Usual onset: At birth
- Duration: Differs due to cause
- Diagnostic method: Report by caregivers and differential diagnosis
- Differential diagnosis: Colic
- Prognosis: Later developmental delays

Infant crying is the vocalizations of infants as a response to an internal or external stimulus. Infants cry as a form of basic instinctive communication. Essentially, newborns are transitioning from life in the womb to the external environment. Up to 27% of parents describe problems with infant crying in the first four months. Up to 38% identify a problem with their infant crying within the first year. Parents can be concerned about the amount of time that their infant cries, how the infant can be consoled, and disrupted sleeping patterns. Colic is used as a synonym for excessive crying of infants, even though colic may not be the cause of excessive crying.

== Physiology ==
Crying may elicit the Valsalva reflex. This reflex negatively impacts sucking pressures and results in poor feeding. The cortisol levels will rise along with blood pressure. Increased blood pressure will have an effect on cerebral blood flow, cerebral blood flow velocity and intracranial pressure. Increased pressures and velocity can lead to intracranial hemorrhage. Prolonged exhalation may also cause some adverse effects. Obstructed venous return and quick inspiratory gasp can occur. Foramen ovale shunting can occur. Adults can often determine whether an infant's cries signify anger or pain. Most parents can distinguish their own infant's cries from those of a different child. Babies mimic their parents' pitch contour. French infants wail on a rising note while German infants favor a falling melody. Overstimulation may be a contributing factor to infant crying and that periods of active crying might serve the purpose of discharging overstimulation and helping the baby's nervous system regain homeostasis.

Although crying is an infant's mode of communication, it is not limited to a monotonous sound. There are three different types of cries apparent in infants. The first of these three is a basic cry, which is a systematic cry with a pattern of crying and silence. The basic cry starts with a cry coupled with a briefer silence, which is followed by a short high-pitched inspiratory whistle. Then, there is a brief silence followed by another cry. Hunger is a main stimulant of the basic cry. An anger cry is much like the basic cry; in this cry, more excess air is forced through the vocal cords, making it a louder, more abrupt cry. This type of cry is characterized by the same temporal sequence as the basic pattern but distinguished by differences in the length of the various phase components. The third cry is the pain cry, which, unlike the other two, has no preliminary moaning. The pain cry is one loud cry, followed by a period of breath holding.

== Misconceptions ==
Misconceptions regarding the purpose of crying in the infant are common among caregivers and medical personnel. These are usually determined by cultural mores and not by evidence-based explanations. Infant crying is regarded by some to be normal. The belief that infants have a need to cry to expand or exercise their lungs is not supported by research. This is because a healthy newborn infant's lungs are able to contain a sufficient amount of air plus a reserve. Birth trauma is related to the amount of crying. Mothers who had experienced obstetrical interventions or who were made to feel powerless during birth had babies who cried more than other babies. Babies who had experienced birth complications had longer crying spells at three months of age and awakened more frequently at night crying. When infants cry for no obvious reason after all other causes (such as hunger or pain) are ruled out, the crying may signify a beneficial stress-release mechanism, although not all sources agree with this. The "crying-in-arms" approach is a way to comfort these infants. Another way of comforting and calming the baby is to mimic the familiarity of the mother's womb. Consistency and promptness of maternal response is associated with a decline in frequency and duration of crying by the end of the first year, and individual differences in crying reflect the history of maternal responsiveness rather than constitutional differences in infant irritability.

== Causes ==
Most infants cry in response to something, although it may be difficult to identify the cause. Sometimes there may be no apparent reason.

Some possible reasons include:

- Hunger
- Sleepiness (Normally just yawns or rubs eyes)
- Gas pain (for example, if the baby has not burped)
- Discomfort (for example, a wet diaper)
- Temperature (for example, feeling too hot or too cold)
- External stimulus (for example, too much noise or light)
- Boredom or loneliness
- Pain (for example, teething)

Excessive crying in infants may indicate colic or another health problem. Some health problems are listed below:

- Trauma
- Abuse
- Corneal abrasions
- Foreign body in the eye
- Fractured bone
- Central nervous system abnormality
  - Chiari type I malformation
  - Infantile migraine
  - Subdural hematoma
- Constipation
- Cow's milk protein intolerance
- Gastroesophageal reflux
- Lactose intolerance
- Rectal fissure
- Infection
  - Meningitis
  - Otitis media
  - Urinary tract infection
  - Viral illness
- Hair tourniquet syndrome

=== Colic ===
The term 'colic' was defined in 1954 as: "crying for more than three hours per day, for more than three days per week, and for more than three weeks in an infant that is well-fed and otherwise healthy." Colic and excessive crying by infants is synonymous to some clinicians. Colic is attributed to gastrointestinal discomfort like intestinal cramping. Clinicians often admit that colic cannot be treated or that alternative treatments are ineffective. The protocol followed by clinicians to treat colic is described as "treating the parents" with reassurance.

== Maternal responses ==
Crying in infants is associated with high stress levels and depression in mothers. Excessive crying has also been linked to maternal "physical aggression" and "angry speaking." Mothers without assistance in caring for the infant, are more prone to physical aggression. During evaluations of maternal depression responses to infant crying, sleeping problems are closely associated with excessive crying. It is not always clear that when sleeping problems are associated with infant crying, whether the sleeping problems are descriptive of the mother or the infant or both. Maternal stress is associated with excessive crying.

== Effects on young children ==
One definition used to study excessive crying in infants (colic) is crying for three or more hours per 24 hours. Excessive infant crying has been associated with a twofold increased risk of the overall problem behavior, conduct problems, hyperactivity, and mood problems at the age of 5–6. Excessive infant crying doubles the risk of behavioral, hyperactivity, and mood problems at the age of 5–6, as reported by their mother. Excessive crying is not the only factor in later childhood difficulties. Behavioral problems in childhood include the so-called regulatory problems, such as excessive crying, sleeping, and feeding problems, which occur in 20% of infants in multiproblem families. Excessive crying, whining and sleeping problems at 4–6 months are associated with decreased social development at 12 months.

Several factors may contribute to, and partly explain, an association between excessive infant crying and later behavioral and emotional problems. During early infancy, the quality of the mother–child dyad can be considered to be a crucial vehicle for child's healthy mental development. Both early maternal and early paternal reciprocity in infancy are predictive of social competence and lower aggression in preschoolers.

Compared to other infants, excessive crying infants had a slightly lower birth weight and a slightly younger gestational age. Excessive crying infants more often had a single, lower educated mother, originating from a non-industrialized country, who reported more depression, a higher burden of infant care, and more aggressive behavior and had an authoritarian parenting style. Excessive crying was associated with a higher risk for hyperactivity/inattention problems, emotional symptoms, conduct problems, peer relationship problems, and overall problem behavior at the age of 5–6, as well as a higher risk for decreased pro-social behavior as reported by the mother. Excessive crying was also associated with mood problems as well as generalized anxiety problems at the age of 5–6.

== Abuse ==
=== Shaken baby syndrome ===
A common type of physical abuse in infants, shaken baby syndrome, is often a reaction to infant crying. Infant crying is a leading risk factor for shaken baby syndrome and other infant abuse.

== Bibliography ==
- Walker, Marsha (2011). Breastfeeding management for the clinician: using the evidence. Sudbury, Mass: Jones and Bartlett Publishers. ISBN 978-0-7637-6651-1.
