= James McEwen (engineer) =

Canadian biomedical engineer

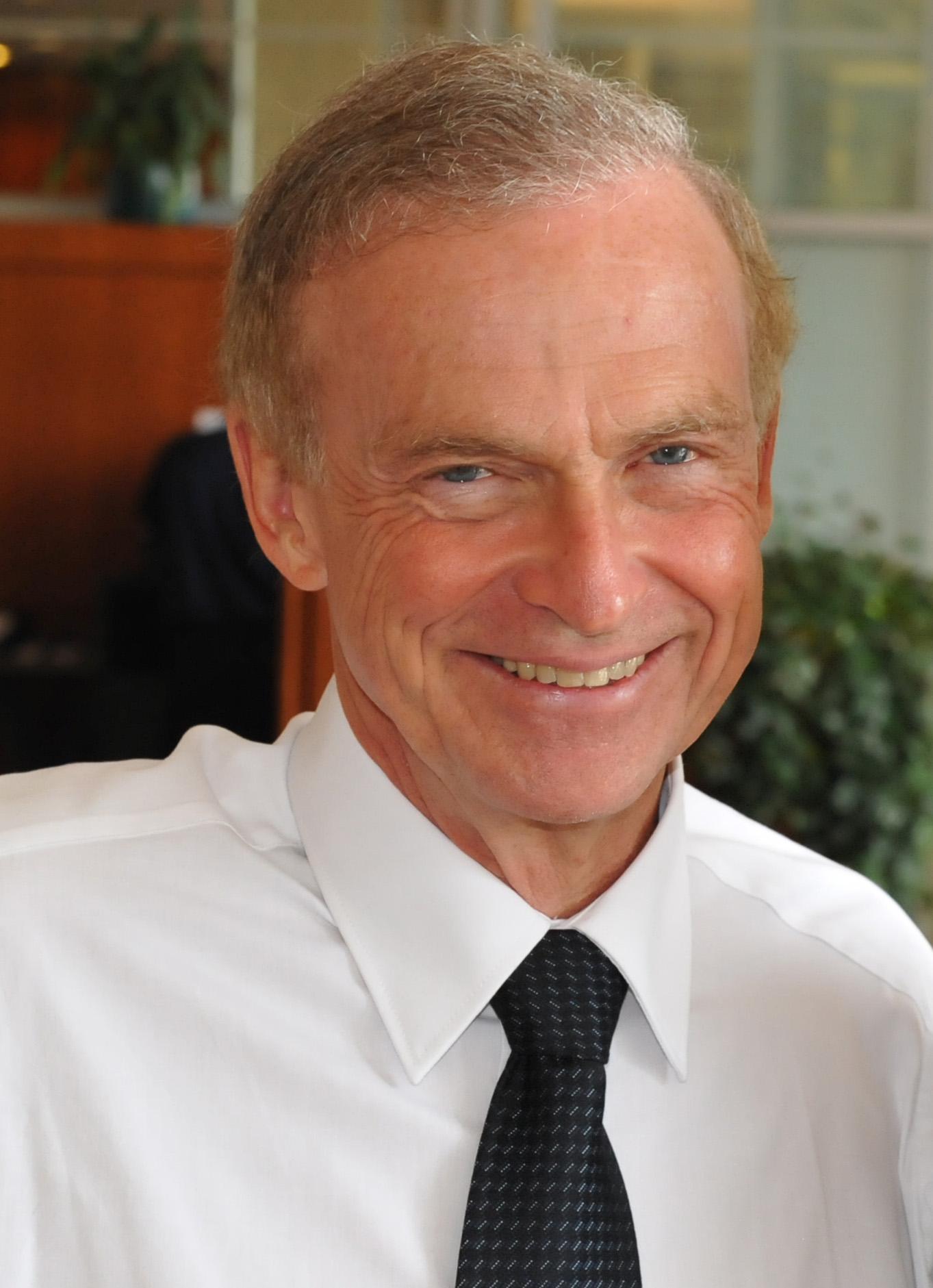

James McEwen OC OBC (born June 10, 1948) is a Canadian biomedical engineer and the inventor of the microprocessor-controlled automatic tourniquet system, which is now standard for 15,000-20,000 procedures daily in operating rooms worldwide. Their widespread adoption and use has significantly improved surgical safety, quality and economy. McEwen is President of Western Clinical Engineering Ltd., a biomedical engineering research and development company and he is a director of Delfi Medical Innovations Inc., a company he founded to commercialize some results of that research and development. He is also an adjunct professor in the School of Biomedical Engineering, in the Department of Orthopaedics and in the Department of Electrical and Computer Engineering at the University of British Columbia.

In 2020, to recognize his invention of automatic tourniquets for surgery and other applications he was inducted to the U.S. National Inventors Hall of Fame, joining others including Thomas Edison, Alexander Graham Bell, the Wright brothers, Banting and Best, Nikola Tesla and Steve Jobs. The National Inventors Hall of Fame, in partnership with the United States Patent and Trademark Office, 'honors the visionaries whose patented inventions have changed our world'. Inductees 'must hold a U.S. patent for an invention that is groundbreaking or a significant advancement in their field' and their 'inventions have been put into widespread use and have improved societal well-being, provided economic benefits to the country and advanced scientific understanding'.

He currently resides in Vancouver, British Columbia, Canada.

== Career ==
McEwen received the B.A.Sc. degree in electrical engineering (biomedical) from the University of British Columbia in 1971. He received the Ph.D. degree in the same field in 1975.

McEwen founded the Biomedical Engineering Department at the Vancouver Hospital & Health Sciences Centre in 1975. He served as the Director from 1975 to 1990. During his tenure at the Vancouver General Hospital, McEwen invented the automatic tourniquet system for surgery. His improvements to tourniquet systems in general led to greater safety and their wider acceptance as the de facto standard for procedures involving bloodless surgical fields and Bier block anaesthesia.

For several years, he served on the Board of Governors of the British Columbia Institute of Technology and the (BC) Premier's Advisory Council on Science and Technology, to help advance post-secondary educational programs.

McEwen also served as chairman of the Board of Directors of the ALS Society of British Columbia. As a result, 'in recognition of outstanding community service', he was honoured with a British Columbia Community Achievement Award and the William Fraser Leadership Development Award from the ALS Society of Canada.

Currently, he is President of Western Clinical Engineering Ltd., a biomedical engineering research and development company that he founded, and he is a director of Delfi Medical Innovations Inc., a company he founded to commercialize some results of that research and development. At University of British Columbia, he is an adjunct professor in the School of Biomedical Engineering, in the Department of Orthopaedics and in the Department of Electrical and Computer Engineering. He is a Life Member of the Institute of Electrical and Electronics Engineers (IEEE) and is a registered Professional Engineer (P.Eng).

For 15 years, McEwen served as a Trustee and Vice Chairman of the Board of Trustees of the Ernest C. Manning Awards Foundation. In that capacity, he worked with like-minded individuals to help increase public awareness of the importance of innovation and innovators to the economy and to society. He also created and funds a number of scholarships and bursaries annually at various high schools to recognize outstanding students who overcome adversities to achieve excellence while at the same time helping others, and to advance public education.

== Recognition ==
McEwen was appointed as an Officer of the Order of Canada for his contribution to biomedical engineering as an inventor and entrepreneur, in December 2011. The Order of Canada is one of the highest civilian honours in Canada. Appointment as an Officer 'recognizes a lifetime of achievement and merit of a high degree, especially in service to Canada or to humanity at large'.

In April 2012, McEwen received the Queen Elizabeth II Diamond Jubilee Medal.

McEwen was awarded a Fellowship in the Canadian Medical Biomedical Engineering Society in 2006.

In 2009, he was awarded a Doctor of Science (honoris causa) degree from Simon Fraser University.

Subsequently, in 2011, he was awarded a Doctor of Science (honoris causa) degree from the University of British Columbia.

In 2016, he was awarded the Dean's Medal of Distinction from the Faculty of Applied Science at the University of British Columbia 'for outstanding contributions to applied science'.

McEwen also received the Research and Innovation Award in 2018 from the UBC Alumni Association for his biomedical inventions, for founding several medical technology companies, for establishing the non-profit Medical Device Development Centre, and for having taken the lead on important issues to create positive social change.

In 2020 he was inducted into the United States National Inventors Hall of Fame.

McEwen was appointed to the Order of British Columbia in 2021. The Order of British Columbia is the highest form of recognition by the Province of British Columbia and "recognizes those persons who have served with the greatest distinction and excelled in any field of endeavour benefiting the people of British Columbia and beyond".
