= Quiet & Still =

2000 studio album by Magnet

Studio album by Magnet
- Released: 10 October 2000
- Recorded: 2000
- Studio: Magnetic Studios, Bergen
- Genre: Alternative rock
- Length: 41:00
- Label: Rec90
- Producer: Even Johansen

Magnet chronology
Quiet & Still (2000)	On Your Side (2003)

Quiet & Still is Magnet's debut album, first released in Norway on 10 October 2000 after the dissolution of his previous band Libido. In the US, the album was released on 15 May 2001 under his birth name, Even Johansen, and featured his picture on the album cover (whereas the Norwegian release featured a logo). The album features early versions of "Where Happiness Lives" and "Nothing Hurts Now", which he would re-record for the follow-up album On Your Side. It also features a cover of Thin Lizzy's "Dancing in the Moonlight (It's Caught Me in Its Spotlight)", written by Phil Lynott.

== Reception ==
Professional ratings
Review scores
Source	Rating
AllMusic	4.5/5 stars

AllMusic's Stanton Swihart awarded Quiet & Still four-and-a-half out of five stars, and praised the album as "a resplendent oasis, catatonic in the most stunning of ways, and like all such phenomena, there is something both uplifting and sorrowful about it, as if the music is both ephemeral and timeless."

== Track listing ==
All tracks are written by Even Johansen, except where noted.

No.	Title	Writer(s)	Length
1.	"The Recluse"		4:33
2.	"Where Happiness Lives"		3:43
3.	"Bullet to Your Heart"		2:49
4.	"Easily Undone"		3:31
5.	"Nothing Hurts Now"		3:50
6.	"There's an End to This"		3:11
7.	"Private Jinx"		3:32
8.	"Quiet & Still"		3:37
9.	"Dancing in the Moonlight (It's Caught Me in Its Spotlight)"	Phil Lynott	3:43
10.	"Beautiful Day"		4:23
11.	"Home Song"		4:07

== Personnel ==
- Martin Kvamme – design
