= Magnet (musician) =

Norwegian singer-songwriter (born 1970)

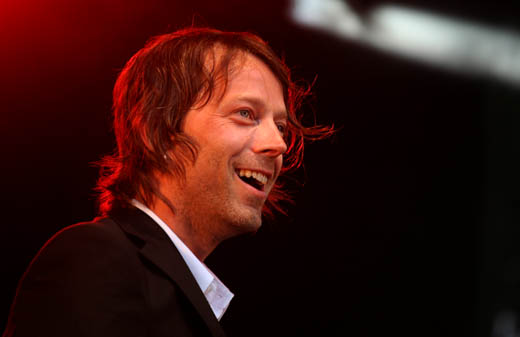
- Magnet during the Skral Festival in Grimstad, Norway.

Background information
- Born: Even Johansen; 7 June 1970 (age 56); Bergen, Norway
- Genres: Folk, pop, electronic
- Occupations: Musician, songwriter
- Instruments: Guitar, lap steel guitar
- Years active: 1991 – present
- Labels: Warner Music Norway; Hermetix Recordings; Atlantic; Ultimate Dilemma

Even Johansen, also known as Magnet (born 7 June 1970), is a Norwegian singer-songwriter. Johansen started his music career in the early 1990s in the bands Chocolate Overdose and Libidō before forging a solo career under the Magnet alias. To date, he has released five full-length solo studio albums as well as several singles and EPs. Johansen draws upon many influences, including folk, pop, and electronica. His albums are composed and produced solely by him, and he usually performs live sets on his own, using preset loops or creating them as he plays.

Several of Magnet’s songs have appeared in television series and films, including "Where Happiness Lives" in Roswell, One Tree Hill, and Everwood; "Lay Lady Lay" in Mr. & Mrs. Smith; "Let It Snow" in The O.C., and "Little Miss More or Less" in Six Feet Under.

The name 'Magnet' comes from his own childhood cure for anaemia involving a homeopathic, magnetic tattoo.

== Biography ==
Even Johansen was born, raised, and resides in Bergen, Norway, but when he started his solo career, he lived just outside the southern Scottish town of Lockerbie.

Johansen was a founding member of the Norwegian rock bands Chocolate Overdose (1991–1994) and Libido (1995–2001), and some of the material he later released as Magnet was written during his time with Libido. His first solo album, Quiet & Still, was released in 2000 under the alias Magnet (in the United States, the album was released under his real name). He gained attention when the song "Where Happiness Lives" was initially censored by U.S. radio stations for explicit language, and later featured in the American television series Roswell.

Magnet's second album On Your Side was released in June 2003 on Ultimate Dilemma to positive critical acclaim. The album features Magnet's duet with Irish singer-songwriter Gemma Hayes on a cover of Bob Dylan's "Lay Lady Lay", which was later featured in the 2005 film Mr. & Mrs. Smith.

Following European and North American tour dates throughout 2003 and 2004, Magnet signed to Atlantic Records for his third album The Tourniquet, which was released in May 2005 to further positive acclaim. In 2006, he contributed several songs to the soundtrack of the video game Dreamfall: The Longest Journey. His fourth studio album, The Simple Life, followed in March 2007 on the Hermetix Recordings label, an imprint of Sony BMG.

Over the years, Johansen has toured with Phoenix, Engineers, Zero 7, Isobel Campbell, Gemma Hayes, Ed Harcourt, Stars, and Doves. He also provided a remix of Doves' song "The Last Broadcast," which was featured on the bonus disc of their 2003 B-sides and rarities compilation Lost Sides.

On 16 July 2011, Johansen posted a single to his Myspace page entitled "Doldrum Days". This was followed by the release of his fifth album, Ferrofluid, on 2 December 2011, which was made available in Norway through iTunes and other retailers.

In September 2019, after a nine-year break, Johansen released the single "Deja Vu" and revealed plans of an album in 2020. The project did not materialise until December 2022, when the EP Shotgun Rider was released.

== Awards ==
- Spellemannprisen 2003 win, "Best male pop artist", for On Your Side
- Alarmprisen 2004 win, "Pop album of the year", for On Your Side
- Edvardprisen 2004 win, pop music, for the song «The Day We Left Town»
- Spellemannprisen 2005 nomination, "Best male artist", for The Tourniquet
- Spellemannprisen 2007 win, "Best male artist" for The Simple Life
- Alarmprisen 2007 nomination, "Pop album of the year", for The Simple Life

== Discography ==
=== Albums ===
- Quiet & Still (10 October 2000)
- On Your Side (23 June 2003)
- The Tourniquet (30 May 2005)
- The Simple Life (26 March 2007)
- Ferrofluid (2 December 2011)

=== Singles/EPs ===
- Where Happiness Lives EP (3 June 2002) (CD, 10")
  1. "Where Happiness Lives"
  2. "I'll Come Along"
  3. "Heaviest Heart"
  4. "Nothing Hurts Now"
- Chasing Dreams EP (23 September 2002) (CD, 10")
  1. "Chasing Dreams"
  2. "Little Miss More or Less"
  3. "Home Song"
  4. "I'll Come Along" (Psychonauts Remix)
- The Day We Left Town EP (21 April 2003) (CD)
  1. "The Day We Left Town"
  2. "Clean Slate"
  3. "Dead Happy"
  4. "The Big Black Moon"
- "Last Day of Summer" single (24 November 2003) (12")
  1. "Last Day of Summer"
  2. "Last Day of Summer" (Tom Middleton Cosmos Vox Remix)
  3. "Last Day of Summer" (Tom Middleton Cosmos Deep Dub)
- "Lay Lady Lay" single (22 March 2004)
  - CD:
  1. "Lay Lady Lay" (with Gemma Hayes) (Radio Edit)
  2. "Wish Me Well"
  3. "Last Day of Summer" (Tom Middleton Cosmos Vox Remix)
  4. "Lay Lady Lay" (enhanced video)
  - 7" vinyl:
  1. "Lay Lady Lay" (with Gemma Hayes)
  2. "Clean Slate" (The Bees Remix Edit)
- Minus EP (29 November 2004) (Norway-only CD)
  1. "Let It Snow"
  2. "Clean Slate"
  3. "Heaviest Heart"
  4. "Dead Happy"
  5. "The Big Black Moon"
  6. "Clean Slate" (The Bees Remix)
- "Hold On" (15 August 2005)
  - UK double 7" set:
  1. "Hold On"
  2. "The Mute"
  3. "The Pacemaker"
  4. "Good Mourning"
  - US Tour EP CD:
  1. "Hold On" (Radio Edit)
  2. "The Mute"
  3. "Good Mourning"
  4. "Grinder"
  5. "Hold On" (Metronomy Remix)
  6. "Hold On" (Lindstrøm Remix)
- "Fall at Your Feet" (5 December 2005)
  - CD:
  1. "Fall at Your Feet" (Jack Joseph Puig Mix)
  2. "This Bird Can Never Fly"
  - 7" vinyl:
  1. "Fall at Your Feet"
  2. "Hold On" (Metronomy Remix)
- Dreamfall: The Longest Journey Soundtrack EP (5 April 2006)
  1. "Be With You" (previously unreleased)
  2. "My Darling Curse"
  3. "The Pacemaker"
  4. "Nothing Hurts Now"
- "Lonely No More" (30 June 2008)
  1. "Lonely No More"
  2. "Pennydrop"
  3. "1997"
  4. "Selfhelper"
- "Deja Vu" (13 September 2019)
  - Single track, digital download only
- Shotgun Rider EP (23 December 2022)
  1. "Shotgun Rider"
  2. "Manana"
  3. "Weep & Wail"
  4. "The Moonbloomers"
  5. "Deja Vu"
