= The Simple Life (Magnet album) =

Studio album by Magnet
- Released: 26 March 2007
- Recorded: 2006–2007
- Studio: Hermetix Recorder, Norway
- Genre: Alternative rock
- Length: 40:05
- Label: Hermetix Records/Sony BMG
- Producer: Even Johansen and Jørgen Træen

Magnet chronology
The Tourniquet (2005)	The Simple Life (2007)	Ferrofluid (2011)

Singles from The Simple Life
- 1. "Lonely No More" Released: 30 June 2008

Professional ratings
Review scores
Source	Rating
The Independent	positive
PopMatters	6/10
The Music Box	5/5 stars

The Simple Life is the fourth studio album by Norwegian musician Magnet, first released in Norway on 26 March 2007 where it debuted on the Norwegian Albums Chart at #1. The album was subsequently released in the United States on 18 September 2007, and the United Kingdom on 24 March 2008. The album includes a cover of "She's Gone", originally by Bob Marley.

== Track listing ==
All tracks are written by Even Johansen, except where noted

No.	Title	Writer(s)	Length
1.	"The Gospel Song"		3:32
2.	"You Got Me"		3:48
3.	"Lonely No More"		3:05
4.	"Count"		3:31
5.	"She's Gone"	Bob Marley	3:24
6.	"A Little Happier"		3:51
7.	"Navigator"		3:39
8.	"The Simple Life"		4:28
9.	"Slice of Heaven"		4:26
10.	"Volatile"		4:15
11.	"Lucid"		2:06

== Singles ==
- Lonely No More EP (30 June 2008)
  1. "Lonely No More" – 3:05
  2. "Pennydrop" – 3:07
  3. "1997" – 3:21
  4. "Selfhelper" – 3:41
