= Tourniquet =

Medical device for restricting blood flow

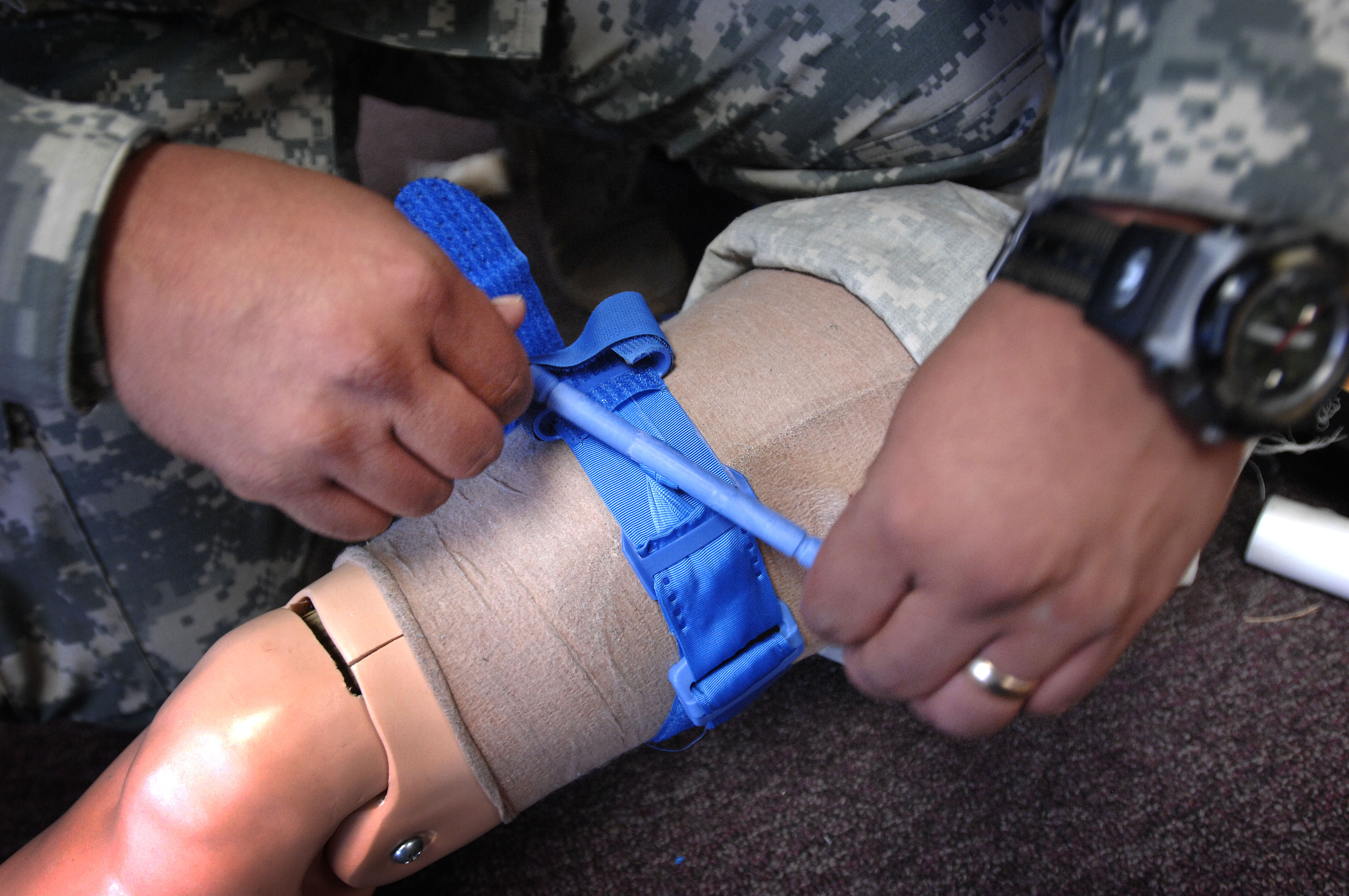
Tourniquet being applied to a leg on a training dummy

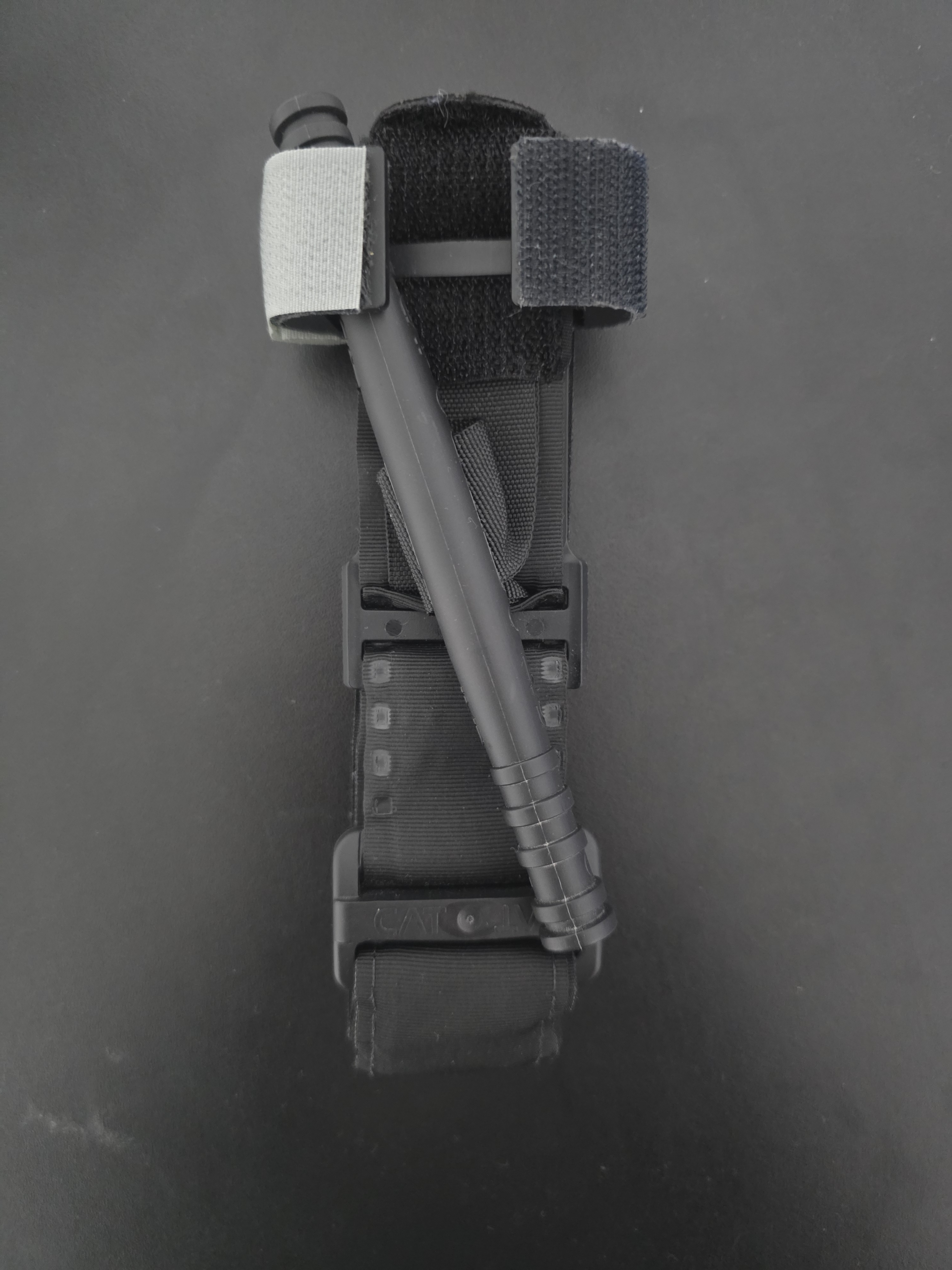
A 7th Generation Combat Application Tourniquet (CAT), commonly used by combat medics (military environment) and EMS (civilian environment)

A tourniquet is a medical device used to stop the flow of blood to a limb or extremity via the application of localized pressure. It may be used in emergencies, in surgery, or in post-operative rehabilitation.

A simple tourniquet can be made from a stick and a rope, but the use of makeshift tourniquets has been reduced over time due to their ineffectiveness compared to a commercial and professional tourniquet. First-aid guidelines recommend using commercially manufactured tourniquets as the primary option for life-threatening bleeding. Improvised tourniquets are used for situations where commercial devices aren't available, or no other viable options are available. This may stem the flow of blood, but side effects such as soft tissue damage and nerve damage may occur.

== History ==
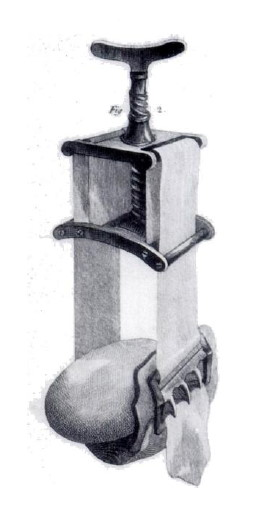
Petit tourniquet engraving from 1798

During Alexander the Great's military campaigns in the fourth century BC, tourniquets were used to stanch the bleeding of wounded soldiers. Romans used them to control bleeding, especially during amputations. These tourniquets were narrow straps made of bronze, using only leather for comfort.

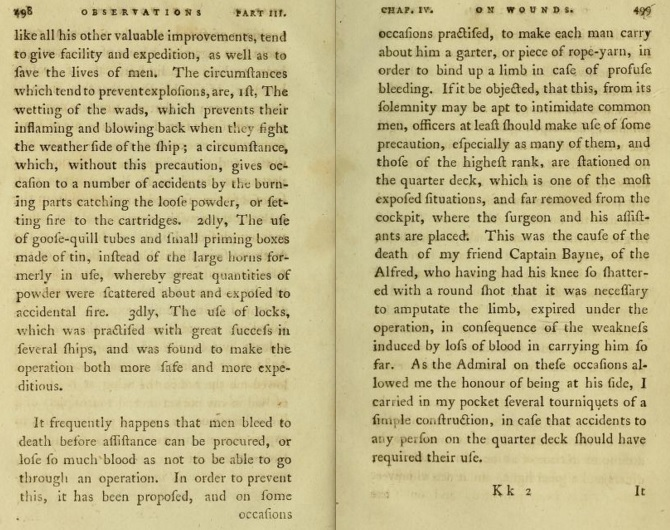
Sir Gilbert Blane advocates the issue of a tourniquet to each man in battle.

In 1718, French surgeon Jean Louis Petit developed a screw device for occluding blood flow in surgical sites. Before this invention, the tourniquet was a simple garrot, tightened by twisting a rod (thus its name tourniquet, from tourner = to turn).

In 1785, Sir Gilbert Blane advocated that, in battle, each Royal Navy sailor should carry a tourniquet:

It frequently happens that men bleed to death before assistance can be procured, or lose so much blood as not to be able to go through an operation. In order to prevent this, it has been proposed, and on some occasions practised, to make each man carry about him a garter, or piece of rope yarn, in order to bind up a limb in case of profuse bleeding. If it be objected, that this, from its solemnity may be apt to intimidate common men, officers at least should make use of some precaution, especially as many of them, and those of the highest rank, are stationed on the quarter deck, which is one of the most exposed situations, and far removed from the cockpit, where the surgeon and his assistants are placed. This was the cause of the death of my friend Captain Bayne, of the Alfred, who having had his knee so shattered with round shot that it was necessary to amputate the limb, expired under the operation, in consequence of the weakness induced by loss of blood in carrying him so far. As the Admiral on these occasions allowed me the honour of being at his side, I carried in my pocket several tourniquets of a simple construction, in case that accidents to any person on the quarter deck should have required their use.

In 1864, Joseph Lister created a bloodless surgical field using a tourniquet device. In 1873, Friedrich von Esmarch introduced a rubber bandage that would both control bleeding and exsanguinate. This device is known as Esmarch's bandage. In 1881, Richard von Volkmann noted paralysis can occur from the use of the Esmarch tourniquet, if wrapped too tightly. Many cases of serious and permanent limb paralysis were reported from the use of non-pneumatic Esmarch tourniquets.

After observing considerable number of pressure paralysis with non-pneumatic, elastic, tourniquets, Harvey Cushing created a pneumatic tourniquet, in 1904. Pneumatic tourniquets were superior over Esmarch's tourniquet in two ways: (1) faster application and removal; and (2) decrease the risk of nerve palsy.

In 1908, August Bier used two pneumatic tourniquets with intravenous local anesthesia to anesthetize the limb without general anesthetics.

In the early 1980s, microprocessor-based pneumatic tourniquet systems were invented by James McEwen. These modern electronic pneumatic tourniquet systems generally regulate the pressure in the tourniquet cuff within 1% of the target pressure and allows real-time monitoring of the inflation time. Modern pneumatic tourniquet systems include audiovisual alarms to alarm the user if hazardously high or low cuff pressures are present, automatic self-test and calibration, and backup power source.

In the 2000s, the silicon ring tourniquet, or elastic ring tourniquet, was developed by Noam Gavriely, a professor of medicine and former emergency physician. The tourniquet consists of an elastic ring made of silicone, stockinet, and pull straps made from ribbon that are used to roll the device onto the limb. The silicone ring tourniquet exsanguinates the blood from the limb while the device is being rolled on, and then occludes the limb once the desired occlusion location is reached. Unlike the historical mechanical tourniquets, the device reduces the risk of nerve paralysis. The surgical tourniquet version of the device is completely sterile, and provides improved surgical accessibility due to its narrow profile that results in a larger surgical field. It has been found to be a safe alternative method for most orthopedic limb procedures, but it does not completely replace the use of contemporary tourniquet devices. More recently the silicone ring tourniquet has been used in the fields of emergency medicine and vascular procedures. However, in 2015 Feldman et al. reported two cases of pulmonary embolism after silicon ring exsanguination tourniquet application in patients with traumatic injuries. In one case of exsanguination tourniquet induced bilateral pulmonary emboli, after rapid intervention a 65-year-old woman was discharged in good condition 7 days after surgery. In a second case with multiple pulmonary emboli, despite extensive efforts of intervention a 53-year-old man's condition quickly deteriorated after surgery, and was declared brain dead 2 days after. While Feldman et al. discuss the potential risk of DVT for various types of tourniquets and exsanguination methods, the authors recommend extreme caution and suggest avoiding the use of an exsanguination tourniquet in patients with risk factors for DVT, including patients with traumatic injury of the extremities.

Most modern pneumatic tourniquet systems include the ability to measure the patient's limb occlusion pressure (LOP) and recommend a tourniquet pressure based on the measured LOP to set safer and lower tourniquet pressures. Limb occlusion pressure is defined as "the minimum pressure required, at a specific time by a specific tourniquet cuff applied to a specific patient's limb at a specific location, to stop the flow of arterial blood into the limb distal to the cuff."

After World War II, the US military reduced use of the tourniquet because the time between application and reaching medical attention was so long that the damage from stopped circulation was worse than that from blood loss. Since the beginning of the 21st century, US authorities have resuscitated its use in both military and non-military situations because treatment delays have been dramatically reduced. The Virginia State Police and police departments in Dallas, Philadelphia and other major cities provide tourniquets and other advanced bandages. In Afghanistan and Iraq, only 2 percent of soldiers with severe bleeding died compared with 7 percent in the Vietnam War, in part because of the combination of tourniquets and rapid access to doctors. Between 2005 and 2011, tourniquets saved 2,000 American lives from the wars in Iraq and Afghanistan. In civilian use, emerging practices include transporting tourniquetted patients even before emergency responders arrive and including tourniquets with defibrillators for emergency use.

There are currently no standards for testing tourniquets although there have been several proposed devices to ensure that the appropriate pressures could be generated including many commercial systems and an open source system that can be largely 3D printed. This would allow distributed manufacturing of tourniquets.

== Risks ==
Risks and contraindications related to the use of a surgical tourniquet include: nerve injuries, skin injuries, compartment syndrome, deep venous thrombosis, and pain. Risk of injury can be minimized by minimizing tourniquet pressure and pressure gradients. Tourniquet pressure and pressure gradients can be minimized by using a tourniquet pressure based on the patient's limb occlusion pressure, and by using a wider, contoured pneumatic tourniquet cuff.

In some elective surgical procedures such as total knee arthroplasty, some research suggests tourniquet use may be associated with an increased risk of adverse events, pain, and a longer hospital stay, despite tourniquet use allowing shorter times in the operating room. However, such evidence (meta-analyses and reviews) often omit the analysis of key tourniquet parameters and their correlation to outcomes leading to limited, inconclusive, and conflicting results.

A study by Pavao et al. compared no tourniquet use to optimized tourniquet use in total knee arthroplasty and found no significant differences in surgical timing, blood loss, thigh and knee pain, edema, range of motion, functional scores, and complications, thus allowing surgery to occur with the benefits of a clean and dry surgical field from an optimized tourniquet without increase procedure-related comorbidities. Therefore, tourniquet use optimized to mitigate tourniquet related-risks while maintaining the benefits of a clear bloodless field and faster operating times may be achieved by minimizing tourniquet pressure and inflated tourniquet times.

== Types ==
There are three types of tourniquets: surgical tourniquets, emergency tourniquets, and rehabilitation tourniquets.

=== Surgical tourniquets ===
Surgical tourniquets prevent blood flow to a limb and enable surgeons to work in a bloodless operative field. This allows surgical procedures to be performed with improved precision, safety and speed. Surgical tourniquets can be divided into two groups: pneumatic tourniquets and non-pneumatic tourniquets.

==== Surgical pneumatic tourniquets ====
Surgical pneumatic tourniquets are routinely and safely used orthopedic and plastic surgery, as well as in intravenous regional anesthesia (Bier block anesthesia) where they serve the additional function of preventing the central spread of local anesthetics in the limb. Modern pneumatic tourniquet systems consist of a pneumatic tourniquet instrument, tourniquet cuffs, pneumatic tubing, and limb protection sleeves.

===== Surgical pneumatic tourniquet instrument =====
Modern pneumatic tourniquet instruments are microcomputer-based with the following features:

- Accurate pressure regulator to maintain cuff pressure within 1% of the target pressure,
- Automatic timer to provide precise record of inflation time,
- Audiovisual alarms to warn the operator if potential hazards are detected,
- Automatic self test and self-calibration to ensure system hardware and software integrity, and
- Backup power source to allow continued operation if unanticipated power outage occurs

Many studies published in the medical literature have shown that higher tourniquet pressures and pressure gradients are associated with higher risks of tourniquet-related injuries. Advances in tourniquet technology have reduced the risk of nerve-related injury by optimizing and personalizing tourniquet pressure based on the patient's Limb Occlusion Pressure (LOP), rather than setting standard tourniquet pressures, which are generally higher and more hazardous. LOP is defined as "the minimum pressure required, at a specific time by a specific tourniquet cuff applied to a specific patient's limb at a specific location, to stop the flow of arterial blood into the limb distal to the cuff." LOP accounts for variables such as cuff design (bladder width), cuff application (snugness), patient limb characteristics (shape, size, tissues), and patient's systolic blood pressure. After LOP is measured, personalized tourniquet pressure is set to LOP plus a safety margin to account for any increase in limb occlusion pressure normally expected during the surgery. The use of personalized pressures and wide contour tourniquet cuffs have been found to reduce average tourniquet pressure by 33%-42% from typical pressures. Setting the tourniquet pressure on the basis of LOP minimizes the pressure and related pressure gradients applied by a cuff to an underlying limb, which helps to minimize the risk of tourniquet-related injuries.

LOP may be measured manually by Doppler ultrasound. However, the method is time-consuming and its accuracy is highly dependent on the skill and experience of the operator. LOP may also be measured automatically using a photoplethysmography distal sensor applied to the patient's finger or toe of the operative limb to detect volumetric changes in blood in peripheral circulation as cuff pressure is gradually increased. Finally, most recently, LOP may be measured using a dual-purpose tourniquet cuff to monitor arterial pulsations in the underlying limb as the cuff pressure is gradually increased.

Pneumatic tourniquet instruments and cuffs are available in a single-line (single-port) or dual-line (dual-port) setup. Single-port configuration uses the same pneumatic line that connects the instrument to the cuff for both pressure regulation and pressure monitoring. Dual-port configuration uses one pneumatic line to regulate pressure and one pneumatic line to monitor pressure. The dual-port configuration may facilitate faster cuff pressure regulation and the detection of occlusions in the hoses.

===== Surgical pneumatic tourniquet cuff =====
Compressed gas is introduced into a bladder within a pneumatic tourniquet cuff by the pneumatic tourniquet instrument through a pneumatic tubing. The inflated cuff exerts pressure on the circumference of the patient's limb to occlude blood flow.

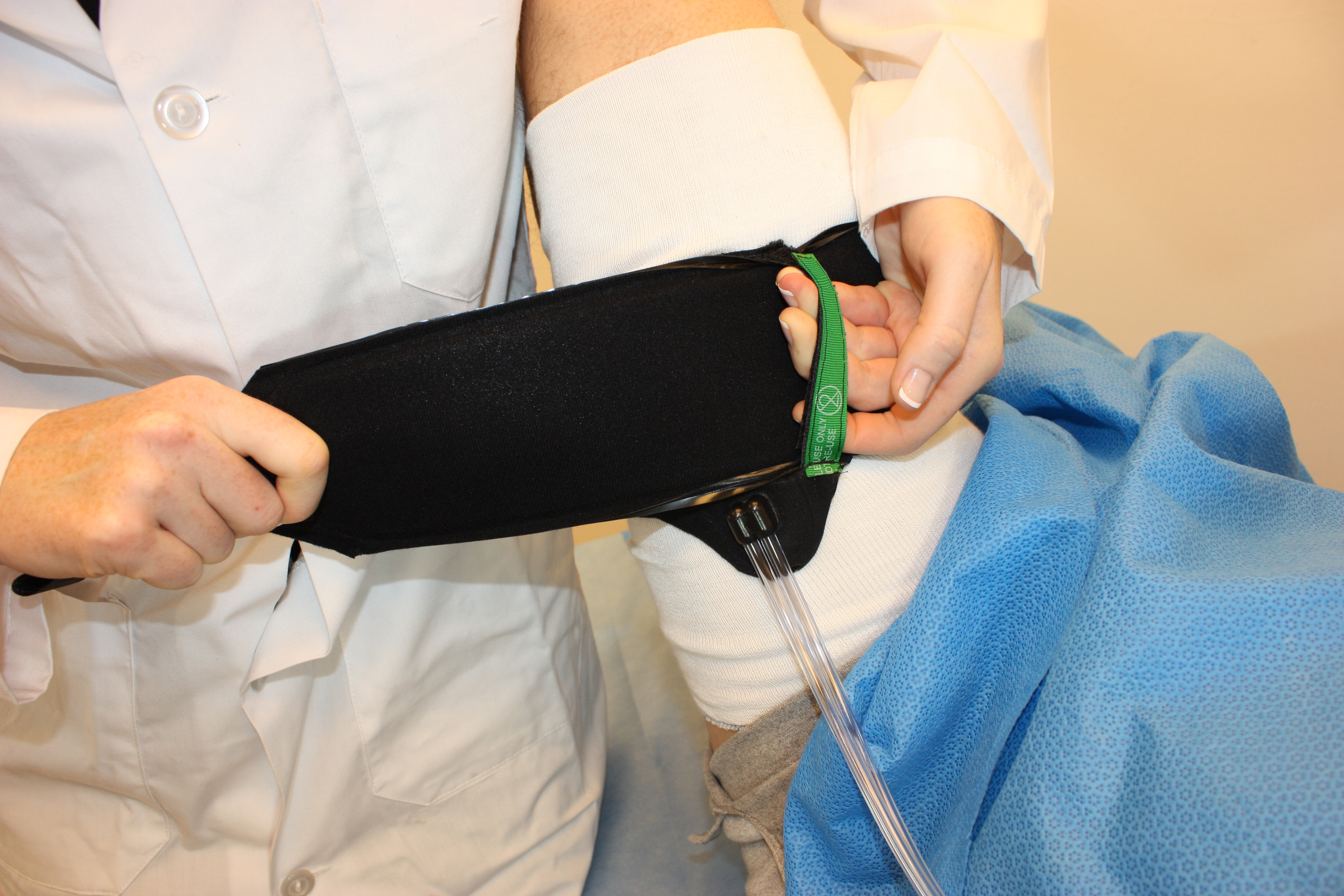
Pneumatic tourniquet cuff with a releasable application handle stabilizer

Compression by the inflated cuff can result in tissue injury. A good tourniquet cuff fit ensures even pressure distribution across the underlying soft tissues, whereas a poor tourniquet cuff fit can result in areas of higher pressure which can lead to soft tissue ischemia. Therefore, in order to safely and effectively occlude blood flow distal to the applied tourniquet cuff, proper selection and application of the tourniquet cuff should be followed.

The following should be considered when selecting a tourniquet cuff:

- Cuff location,
- Limb shape which determines the cuff shape (e.g. cylindrical or contour shaped),
- Limb circumference which determines the cuff length,
- Cuff width,
- Single versus dual bladder design (e.g. whether an IVRA cuff is needed), and
- Use sterile cuff when it will be very close to the sterile field

===== Surgical limb protection sleeve =====
It is recommended to protect the limb beneath the cuff by applying a low-lint, soft padding around the limb, prior to cuff application, according to the cuff manufacturer's instructions for use. Matching limb protection sleeves matched to the cuff width and patient's limb circumference has been shown to produce significantly fewer, less severe wrinkles and pinches in the skin surface than other padding types tested.

==== Surgical non-pneumatic tourniquet ====
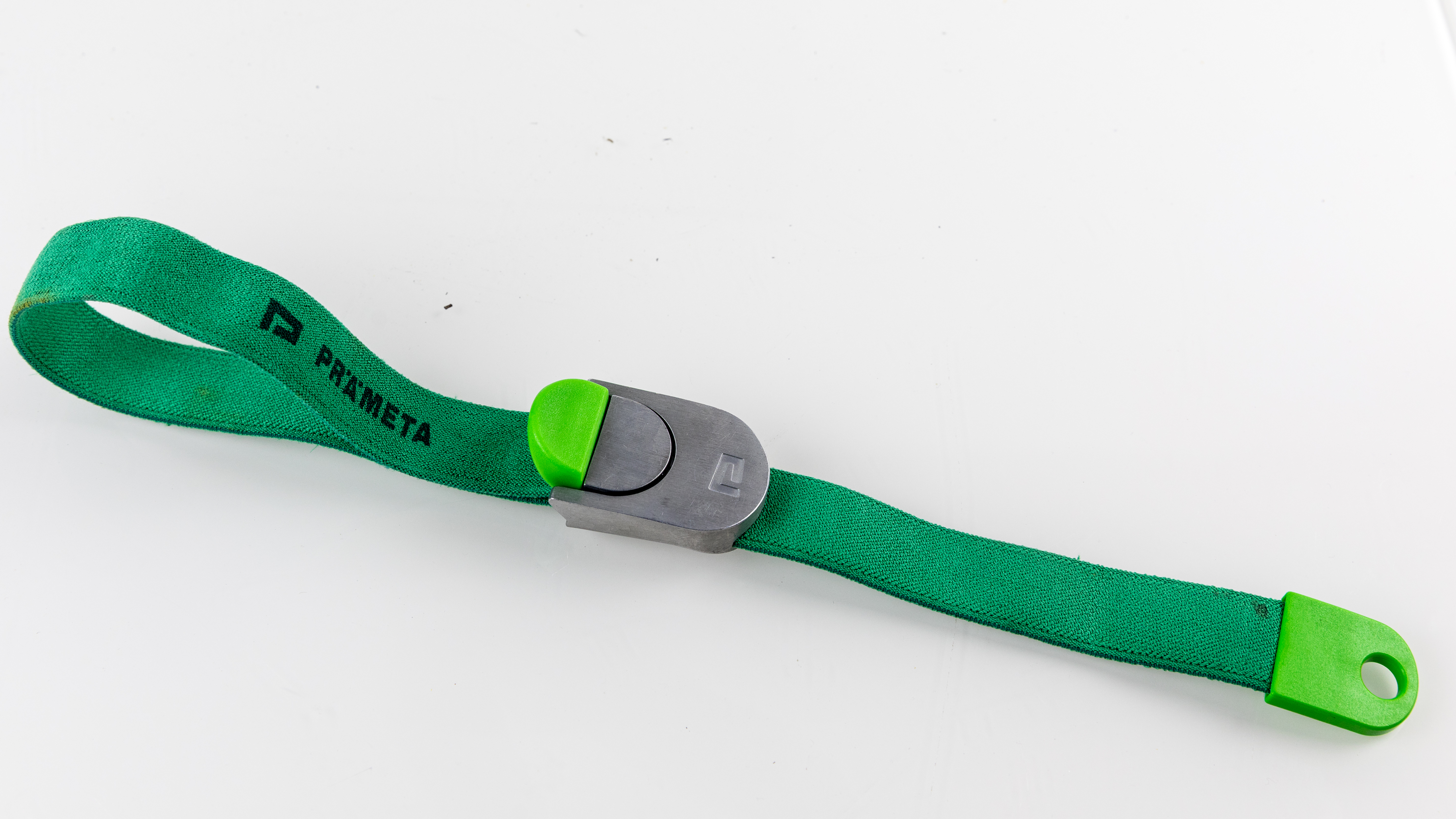
Non-pneumatic tourniquet

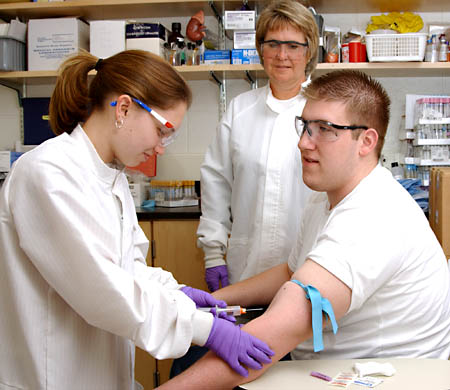
A student practicing phlebotomy (venipuncture) using an elastic tourniquet.

In silicone ring tourniquets, or elastic ring tourniquets, the tourniquet comes in a variety of sizes. To determine the correct tourniquet size, the patient's limb circumference at the desired occlusion location should be measured, as well as their blood pressure to determine the best model. Once the correct model is selected, for a surgical purpose, typically two sterile medical personnel will be needed to apply the device. Unlike with a pneumatic tourniquet, the silicone ring tourniquet should be applied after the drapes have been placed on the patient. This is due to the device being completely sterile. The majority of the devices require a two-man operation (with the exception of the extra large model):

1. One person is responsible for holding the patient's limb. The other will place the device on the limb (extra large models may require two people).
2. Application:
  1. The elastic ring tourniquet is placed on the patient's limb. If placed on a hand or foot, all fingers or toes should be enclosed within the tourniquet.
  2. The handles of the tourniquet should be positioned medial-lateral on the upper extremity or posterior-anterior on the lower extremity.
  3. The person applying the device should start rolling the device while the individual responsible for the limb should hold the limb straight and maintain axial traction.
  4. Once the desired occlusion location is reached, the straps can be cut off or tied just below the ring.
  5. A window can be cut or the section of stockinet can be completely removed.
  6. Once the surgery is completed the device is cut off with a supplied cutting card.

The elastic ring tourniquet follows similar recommendations noted for pneumatic tourniquet use:

1. It should not be used on a patient's limb for more than 120 minutes, as the interruption of blood flow may cause cell damage and necrosis.
2. The tourniquet should not be placed on the ulnar nerve or the peroneal nerve.
3. The silicone ring device cannot be used on patients with blood problems such as DVT, edema, etc.
4. A patient suffering from skin lesions or a malignancy should use this type of tourniquet.

=== Emergency tourniquets ===
Emergency tourniquets differ from surgical tourniquets as are they are used in military combat care, emergency medicine, and accident situations where electrical power is not available, and may need to be applied by an assisting person or self-applied by the injured person. Emergency tourniquets are assessed for their effectiveness of hemorrhage control, pulse stoppage distal to the tourniquet, time to stop bleeding, total blood loss, and applied pressure. However, their design and safe use should be considered as it relates to nerve injury, reperfusion injury, soft tissue injury, and pain.

Early implementation of non-pneumatic tourniquet use in the nineteenth century for non-amputation surgical procedures often resulted in reports of permanent and temporary limb paralysis, nerve injuries, and other soft-tissue injuries. As a result, pneumatic tourniquets were developed for surgery, where the applied pressure and pressure gradients can be controlled, minimized, and controlled, and thereby minimize the risk of tourniquet related injuries.

==== Pneumatic emergency tourniquet ====
===== Emergency military tourniquet =====
The Emergency & Military Tourniquet (EMT) is an example of a pneumatic tourniquet developed for safe use in pre-hospital or military settings. In a study that evaluated 5 emergency tourniquet systems for use in the Canadian Forces, the EMT was one of the most effective tourniquets and caused the least pain. In another study comparing the effectiveness of 3 emergency tourniquet systems, while all devices were effective in both hemorrhage control and stopping blood flow, the EMT also performed the best for shortest time to stop blood flow, lowest total blood loss, and required the least amount of pressure to stop blood flow.

==== Non-pneumatic emergency tourniquet ====
===== Silicone ring auto-transfusion tourniquet =====
The silicone ring auto-transfusion tourniquet (SRT/ATT/EED), or surgical auto-transfusion tourniquet (HemaClear), is a simple to use, self-contained, mechanical tourniquet that consists of a silicone ring, stockinet, and pull straps that results in the limb being exsanguinated and occluded within seconds of application. The tourniquet can be used for limb procedures in the operating room, or in emergency medicine as a means to stabilize a patient until further treatment can be applied.

===== Combat application tourniquet =====
The combat application tourniquet (CAT) was developed by Ted Westmoreland. It is used by the U.S. and coalition militaries to provide soldiers a small and effective tourniquet in field combat situations. It is also used in the UK by NHS ambulance services, along with some UK fire and rescue services. The unit utilizes a windlass with a locking mechanism and can be self-applied. The CAT has been adopted by military and emergency personnel around the world.

An open hardware-based 3D printing project called the Glia Tourniquet (windlass type) enables emergency tourniquets to use distributed manufacturing to make them for $7 in materials. Concerns over quality control of distributed manufactured tourniquets was partially addressed with an open source testing apparatus. The tourniquet tester costs less than $100 and once calibrated with a blood pressure monitor, the built-in LCD displays the measuring range of the tester (0 to 200 N), which can be used to test the validation of all tourniquets.

=== Rehabilitation tourniquets ===
==== Personalized blood flow restriction ====
Recently, pneumatic tourniquets have been successfully used for a technique called Personalized Blood Flow Restriction Training (PBFRT) to accelerate the rehabilitation of orthopedic patients, injured professional athletes, and wounded soldiers.

Typically, to increase muscle size and strength, a person needs to lift loads at or above 65% of their one repetition maximum. However, injured patients are often limited to low-load resistance exercise where strength and size benefits are limited compared to high-load resistance exercise.

Low-load resistance exercise combined with blood flow restriction (BFR) has been shown in literature to increase both muscle strength and size across different age groups. With BFR, exercise can be performed at substantially lower loads and intensities while generating similar muscular and physiological adaptations seen in high intensity resistance training. For load compromised populations, this reduces the pain during the exercise protocol and leads to overall improvements in physical function.

To provide consistent BFR pressure stimulus to patients, it is recommended to (1) apply a restrictive pressure that is personalized to each individual patient based on the patient's limb occlusion pressure, and (2) utilize a BFR system that can provide surgical-grade tourniquet autoregulation.

== See also ==
- Intravenous regional anesthesia
- Emergency bleeding control
- Emergency tourniquet
- Neural tourniquet
- Battlefield medicine
- Tourniquet test
- Hair tourniquet
- Ischemia-reperfusion injury of the appendicular musculoskeletal system
- Vascular occlusion training
