= Doddo Andersen =

Norwegian musician

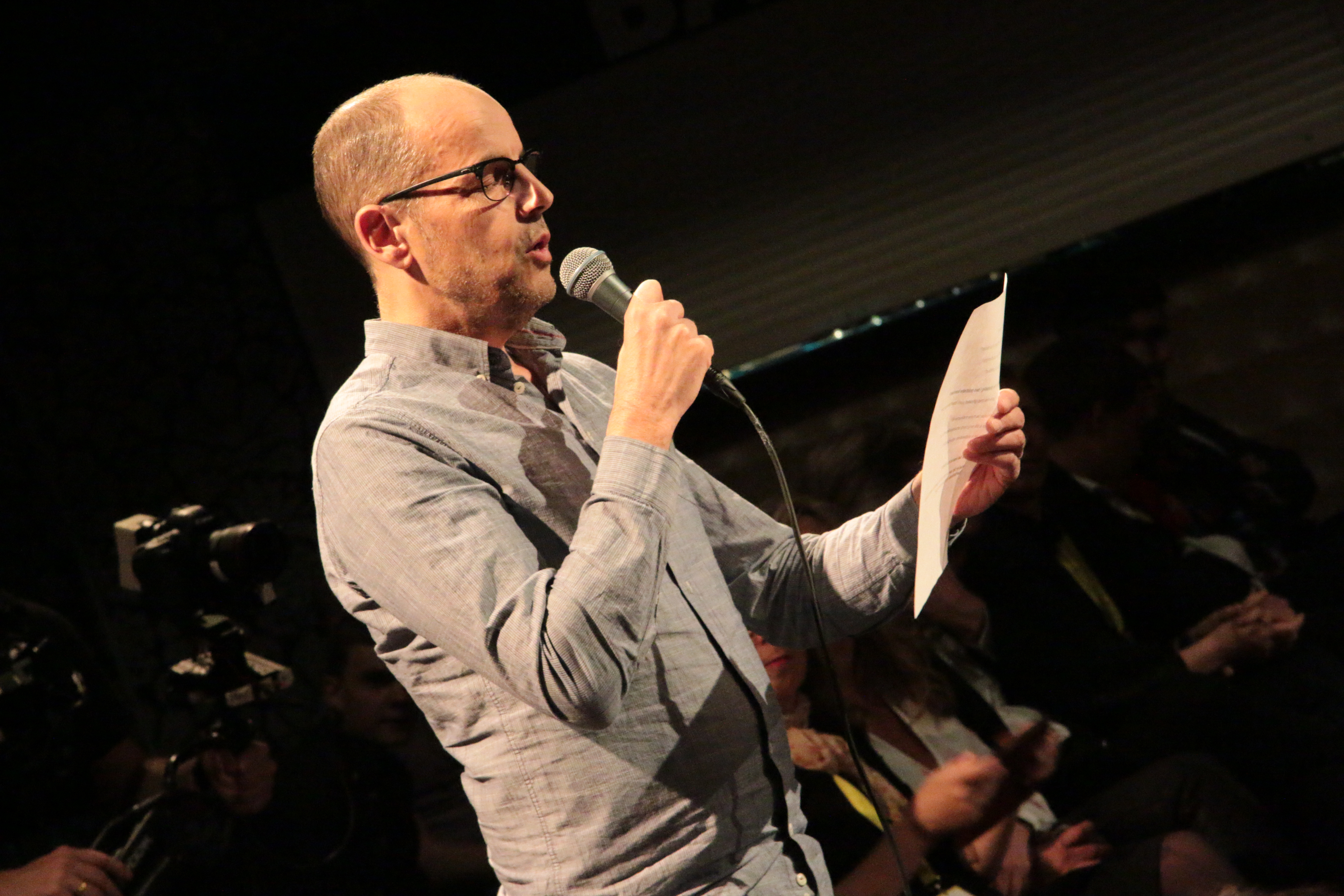

Background information
- Born: Eduardo Hans Andersen; 16 October 1963 (age 62); Bergen, Hordaland, Norway
- Genres: Singer-songwriter, author
- Occupations: Musician, songwriter, writer
- Instruments: Guitar, vocals
- Years active: 1983–present
- Member of: Unge Frustrerte Menn
- Website: doddo.no

Eduardo Hans "Doddo" Andersen (born 16 October 1963) is a Norwegian singer-songwriter known as frontman of the band Unge Frustrerte Menn (UFM), a band that through seven albums gained local popularity in Bergen as well as nationwide performance at NRK.

== Biography ==
Doddo has in addition to the band UFM collaborated with Odd Nordstoga writing the revue "Kjærlighet er best på pinne" (Love is best on the stick lollipop), also the title of a book written by Doddo, about the four stages men go through in the pursuit of love.

Doddo is a permanent writer in the website of newspaper Bergens Tidendes where he blogs about all that concerns the football club Brann. Doddo has released five books. "Mitt Haukeland – En nær livet-opplevelse" (My Haukeland – A close to life experience) was released in 2012. The book is about Haukeland University Hospital, and was published in connection to the hospital's centenary anniversary.

Doddo is the son of the pianist Knut Albrigt Andersen, and the brother of musicians, guitarist Knut Luedy "Tino" Andersen and singer-songwriter and record producer Geir Luedy Andersen.

On 3 November 2022, Andersen was appointed Bergen City Commissioner for Culture, Volunteers and Inclusion in Rune Bakervik's new commission.

== Discography ==
- Slanger og Snegler – 1991 (Sigma Music)
- Doddo og Unge Frustrerte Menn – 1995 (Tylden & Co.)
- Sosialantropologi – 1996 (Lucky Music)
- Hodet i Sanden – 1997 (Grappa)
- Øl og Peanøtter – 1998 (Grappa)
- Dronningen av Kalde Føtter – 2001 (Grappa)
- Solen Titter Frem – 2002 (Grappa)

== Bibliography ==
- Kjærlighet er best på pinne (2005)
- Kjeks og samliv (2007)
- Hei, døden (2009)
- Fortellingen om Brann (2010)
- Mitt Haukeland. En nær livet-opplevelse (2012)

== Eksterne lenker ==
- Doddo's website
- Doddo's Brann-blogg
- MIC Article: Unge Frustrerte Menn
- Dagbladet.no: Kreftanstrengelsen
- Presentation of Eduardo Andersen in Forfatterkatalogen at Forfattersentrum's website
