= Neural tourniquet =

Neural tourniquet — this is an example of bioelectronic medicine, a proposed method of stopping bleeding by stimulating the vagus nerve, which connects to the brain and spleen. This method was invented and tested at the Feinstein Institute.

The neural tourniquet may offer a non-invasive way to stop uncontrolled bleeding. As of 2024 it remained in animal trials.

The neural tourniquet could be used to treat internal injuries from accidents, falls, or gunshots by reducing bleeding.

== Mechanism of action ==
In this way, the vagus nerve sends a signal to the spleen, which intensifies the release of platelets that circulate thrombocytes the body, searching for damage. When damage is detected, the prepared thrombocytes are activated more quickly and accelerate blood clotting. Doctors claim that vagus nerve stimulation may also be used for internal bleeding.

== See also ==
- Tourniquet
