= Jean-Louis Petit (surgeon) =

French surgeon

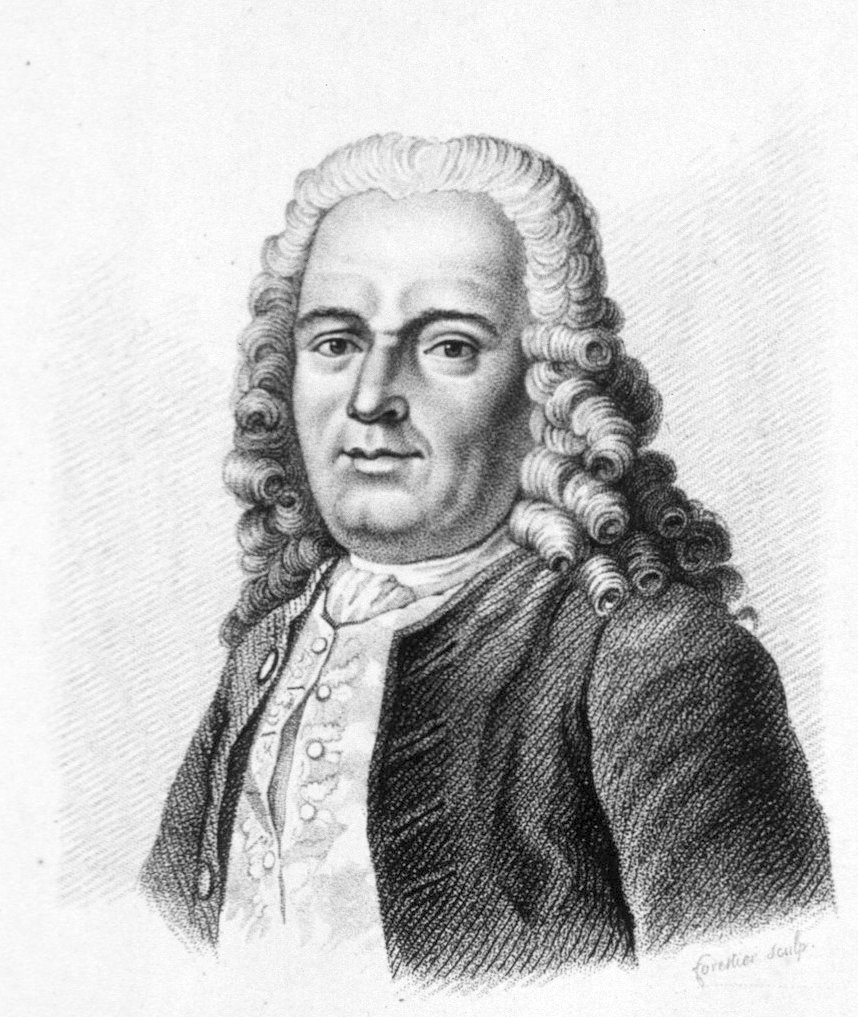
Jean-Louis Petit

Jean-Louis Petit (French: [ʒɑ̃ lwi pəti]; 13 March 1674 – 20 April 1750) was a French surgeon and the inventor of a screw-type tourniquet. He was first enthusiastic about anatomy and received a master's certificate in surgery in Paris in 1700. He became a member of the French Royal Academy of Sciences in 1715 and was named director of the French Royal Academy of Surgery by the king when it was created in 1731. He acquired great notoriety because of his skill and experience, thanks to his case reports of hemorrhage, lacrimal fistula and operation on the frenum, for his treatise on bone diseases and especially for his general treatise on surgical operations, on which he worked for 12 years and which was finished after his death by François-Dominique Lesné (1722—1800).

== See also ==
- Royal Commission on Animal Magnetism – 1784 French scientific bodies' investigations involving systematic controlled trials
