= Fana Upper Secondary School =

High school in Bergen, Norway

Fana Gymnas

Location
- Bergen, Hordaland; Norway
- Coordinates: 60.3392°N 5.3422°E

Information
- Type: Public
- Established: 1916
- Closed: 2016
- Headmaster: Randi Wennemo
- Staff: 58
- Enrollment: 500
- Website: www.fag.hfk.no

Fana Gymnas was a public high school located in Fana in Bergen, Norway. The school was founded in 1916 as a middle school, and the headmaster was the father of Nordahl Grieg. The school became a high school in 1935.

The school was known for their annual play, Fana Skoleteater, that has existed since 1938. The play had a break between 1972 and 1986 because of a discord between the students and the administration. Later the play was managed by students and former students.
