= Geir Luedy =

Geir Steen-Olsen Luedy
- Born: 7 August 1968 (age 56); Bergen, Norway
- Genres: Folk, pop, rock
- Occupation(s): Musician, songwriter, music producer
- Instrument(s): Guitar, vocals, multi-instrumentalist
- Years active: 1988–present
- Website: lydriket.no

Geir Luedy (full name Geir Steen-Olsen Luedy, previous name 1990s Geir Luedy Andersen, born 7 August 1968 in Karlstad) is a Norwegian manager, musician (vocals, guitar, bass, piano, percussion), songwriter, and music producer.

== Biography ==
Geir Luedy began his career in production in 1998 as tape-boy for SIGMA studios in Bergen. He founded together with Even Johannsen the band Chocolate Overdose (singer-writer) in 1991 whereupon they released four albums over a period between 1992 and 1998. In 1998 he co-founded Lydriket Studio in Bergen and later co-founded the production company Your Favorite Music in 2003 together with Hans Petter Aaserud.

In 2012 he brought both companies into MADE Management and is now manager for artists such as AURORA, Sigrid and others.

He is the son of Knut Albrigt Andersen, and brother of the musicians guitarist "Tino" Knut Luedy Andersen and singer-songwriter "Doddo" Eduardo Hans Andersen. Luedy has performed with a series of artists, most of them based in Bergen.

== Discography ==
With Monalisa Overdrive

- 1988: Shake Me Hip (Tanzmusik Für Die Massen)

With Forbidden Colours

- 1989: Words to the World & Songs for the Girl (Colour Records)

With Barbie Bones

- 1990: Brake For Nobody (EMI)
- 1992: Death in the Rocking Horse Factory (EMI)

With Chocolate Overdose

- 1992: Everybody Likes Chocolate (WEA – 4509-90787-2)
- 1993: Sugar Baby (WEA – 4509-93426-2)
- 1998: Whatever (Rune Grammofon – RCD 2003)

With Submarine Sunflowers

- 1992: Submarine Sunflowers (Rec90)

With DumDum Boys

- 1992: Transit (Oh Yeah!), on "God På Bunn"

With Kivi

- 1994: Den Dag Kjem Aldri (Tylden & Co – GTACD 8016)

With Unge Frustrerte Menn

- 1995: Doddo Og Unge Frustrerte Menn (Tylden & Co)
- 1997: Hodet I Sanden (Grappa)
- 2001: Dronningen Av Kalde Føtter (Grappa – GRCD 4135)

With Kåre Kalvenes (K.K.)

- 1995: Strings Attached (Splean Music – SM-106)

With The Tubs

- 1995: Pow Pow Pilots (Rec90 – RID 016)

With Logikal

- 1999: Maniacs Panics And Crashes (Supernova – SNCD 6002)

With Aftenlandet

- 2000: God Morgon Høst (Bergen Records – BRCD 1005)

With Millpond Moon

- 2001: Nation of Two (Bergen Records – BRCD 1007)

With Steady Steele and the Starseekers

- 2002: Steady Steele and the Starseekers (Soundlet Soundlet – CD 001)

With Tre Vise Menn

- 2002: ...I Ein Tynne Tråd (Grappa – GRCD 4191)

With Karin Park

- 2003: Superworldunknown (Waterfall Records, Universal)
- 2006: Change Your Mind (Superworldmusic – N 50025-2)

With Kenneth Sivertsen

- 2004: Fløyel (Noble Records – NOBCD 041), on "Fløyel"

With Robert Post

- 2005: Robert Post (Mercury – 9873483), on "Got None"

With Jan Eggum

- 2005: 30/30 (Grappa – GRCD 4230)

With Susanne Sundfør

- 2007: Susanne Sundfør (Your Favourite Music, MBN – N 50048-2)

With The Alexandria Quartet

- 2007: The Alexandria Quartet (Your Favourite Music)

With Heine Totland

- 2009: The Sunny Side (Your Favourite Music – YFM20092), on "All Dressed Up With Nowhere to Go"

With Wenche Gausdal

- 2012: Alegria (Losen Records – LOS 116–2)

== Singles ==
With Kenneth Sivertsen

- 2000: Var Ikkje Der / Traff Deg Så Tidleg (Edel – EREP 107386)

With Paris

- 2002: Without You (Columbia)

With Tennis

- 2002: Here Comes The Coastguard / Enter The Dragon (Flow-Fi Records – flow-fi 04.02)

With Glenn Kristian Olstad (Glenn)

- 2004: Thanks For Leaving (Waterfall Records – WTRS003)

With Trang Fødsel

- 2005: Fredag (Sony BMG Music Entertainment – PROMO CD 1)
