= On Your Side (Magnet album) =

Studio album by Magnet
- Released: 28 May 2003
- Recorded: 2002–2003
- Studio: Magnetophonic Mobil, Bergen; Magnetophonic Labs, Bergen; Sawmills, Cornwall
- Genre: Alternative rock
- Length: 49:37
- Label: Ultimate Dilemma
- Producer: Even Johansen

Magnet chronology
Quiet & Still (2000)	On Your Side (2003)	The Tourniquet (2005)

Singles from On Your Side
- 1. "Last Day of Summer" Released: 24 November 2003; 2. "Lay Lady Lay" Released: 22 March 2004

Professional ratings
Review scores
Source	Rating
Drowned in Sound	8/10
PopMatters	neutral
Slant Magazine	4/5 stars

On Your Side is the second studio album by Norwegian musician Magnet. The album was first released in Japan on 28 May 2003, on 23 June 2003 in Norway, 7 July 2003 in the United Kingdom, and 28 September 2004 in the United States. It contains a cover of Bob Dylan's "Lay Lady Lay" featuring Gemma Hayes, which was featured in the 2005 film Mr. & Mrs. Smith.

Three EPs preceded the album's release: Where Happiness Lives in June 2002, Chasing Dreams in September 2002, and The Day We Left Town in April 2003. Additionally, two singles followed to promote the album: "Last Day of Summer" in November 2003, and the aforementioned "Lay Lady Lay" in March 2004.

== Track listing ==
All tracks are written by Even Johansen, except where noted.

No.	Title	Writer(s)	Length
1.	"Everything's Perfect"		3:58
2.	"Last Day of Summer"		4:41
3.	"Where Happiness Lives"		3:36
4.	"On Your Side"		5:26
5.	"The Day We Left Town"		3:59
6.	"Nothing Hurts Now"		3:47
7.	"Lay Lady Lay" (featuring Gemma Hayes)	Bob Dylan	4:37
8.	"Overjoyed"		4:30
9.	"I'll Come Along"		4:23
10.	"My Darling Curse"		4:32
11.	"Smile to the World"		6:03

Japanese CD edition bonus tracks
No.	Title	Length
12.	"Chasing Dreams"	4:22
13.	"Little Miss More or Less"	3:49
14.	"Wish Me Well"	3:09

- The US release of the album includes the same bonus tracks, but switches the placement of tracks 13 and 14.

== Singles ==
- "Where Happiness Lives" on the Where Happiness Lives EP (3 June 2002)
- "Chasing Dreams" on the Chasing Dreams EP (23 September 2002)
- "The Day We Left Town" on The Day We Left Town EP (21 April 2003)
- "Last Day of Summer" (24 November 2003)
- "Lay Lady Lay" (22 March 2004)
- "On Your Side" (remixes by Optimo) (promo only, 2004)

== Personnel ==
Album artwork by Martin Kvamme.
