= The Tourniquet =

Studio album by Magnet
- Released: 30 May 2005
- Recorded: 2004–2005
- Studios: Bolero Levende Lyd & Krabbe, Djeveløya; Cherokee Studios, Los Angeles
- Genre: Alternative rock
- Length: 40:36
- Label: Atlantic
- Producers: Even Johansen; Jason Falkner; Jørgen Træen; Yngve Sætre

Magnet chronology
On Your Side (2003)	The Tourniquet (2005)	The Simple Life (2007)

Singles from The Tourniquet
- 1. "Hold On" Released: 15 August 2005; 2. "Fall at Your Feet" Released: 5 December 2005

Professional ratings
Aggregate scores
Source	Rating
Metacritic	65/100
Review scores
Source	Rating
AllMusic	4/5 stars
Pitchfork	4.1/10
PopMatters	6/10
Slant Magazine	3/5 stars

The Tourniquet is the third studio album by Norwegian musician Magnet, first released in Norway on 30 May 2005 where it debuted on the Norwegian Albums Chart at #2. The album was released in the United Kingdom on 22 August 2005, 31 August 2005 in Japan, and 14 February 2006 in the United States. The album is named after a drink called "the Tourniquet," which Even Johansen sampled "in a Singapore airport bar, en route back from Los Angeles" after recording there. The Tourniquet was Magnet's only album released by major label Atlantic Records.

There were two singles released from the album: "Hold On" in August 2005, and "Fall at Your Feet" in December 2005. The song "Believe" was scheduled to be released in 2006 as the third single, but was canceled. The Japanese CD edition of the album includes the bonus tracks "The Mute", "This Bird Can Never Fly" and "Good Mourning", while the American CD release contains the song "This Bird Can Never Fly" as a bonus track; the song also appeared as the B-side to "Fall at Your Feet".

== Track listing ==
All tracks are written by Even Johansen.

No.	Title	Length
1.	"Hold On"	5:00
2.	"Duracellia"	4:01
3.	"The Pacemaker"	5:06
4.	"Believe"	3:37
5.	"All You Ask"	4:07
6.	"Deadlock"	4:04
7.	"Fall at Your Feet"	3:27
8.	"Blow by Blow"	3:59
9.	"Miss Her So"	3:41
10.	"Jaws"	3:34

American CD edition bonus track
No.	Title	Length
11.	"This Bird Can Never Fly"	3:16

Japanese CD edition bonus tracks
No.	Title	Length
11.	"The Mute"	4:27
12.	"This Bird Can Never Fly"	3:16
13.	"Good Mourning"	4:31
