= Barbie Bones =

Norwegian rock band

- Origin: Bergen, Norway
- Genres: Rock music
- Years active: 1987–1993
- Labels: EMI Music
- Members: Yngve Sætre, Dag Igland, Sveinung Igesund, Rune Kogstad, Espen Lien
- Past members: Geir Luedy Andersen

Barbie Bones was a rock band from Bergen, Norway that existed in the period 1987 to 1993. The band started under the name Monalisa Overdrive, and released two albums before it was dissolved. Under their first name, they released the EP Shake Me Hip in 1988. They then changed their name to Barbie Bones released their first album Brake For Nobody på EMI Music in 1990. The album was released worldwide, and the band played concerts in Europe and the U.S. The second album, Death in the Rockinghorse Factory, was released in 1992 and it was awarded the 1992 Spellemann prize in the rock category. Despite good reviews, none of the albums achieved big sales figures. This combined with problems with the follow-up from the record company led to the band being dissolved in 1993. The band has since had some reunion concerts, including in connection with a jubilee concert for the venue Garage in Bergen (2000) and at the 2006 Nattjazz.

== Band members ==
- Yngve Sætre: vocals
- Dag Igland: guitar
- Sveinung Igesund: keyboards
- Rune Kogstad: drums
- Geir Luedy Andersen: bass (−1989)
- Espen Lien: bass (1989–)

== Discography ==
- Brake for Nobody (EMI, 1990)
- Death in the Rockinghorse Factory (EMI, 1992)
