= Emergency tourniquet =

Device used to stop blood loss in an emergency

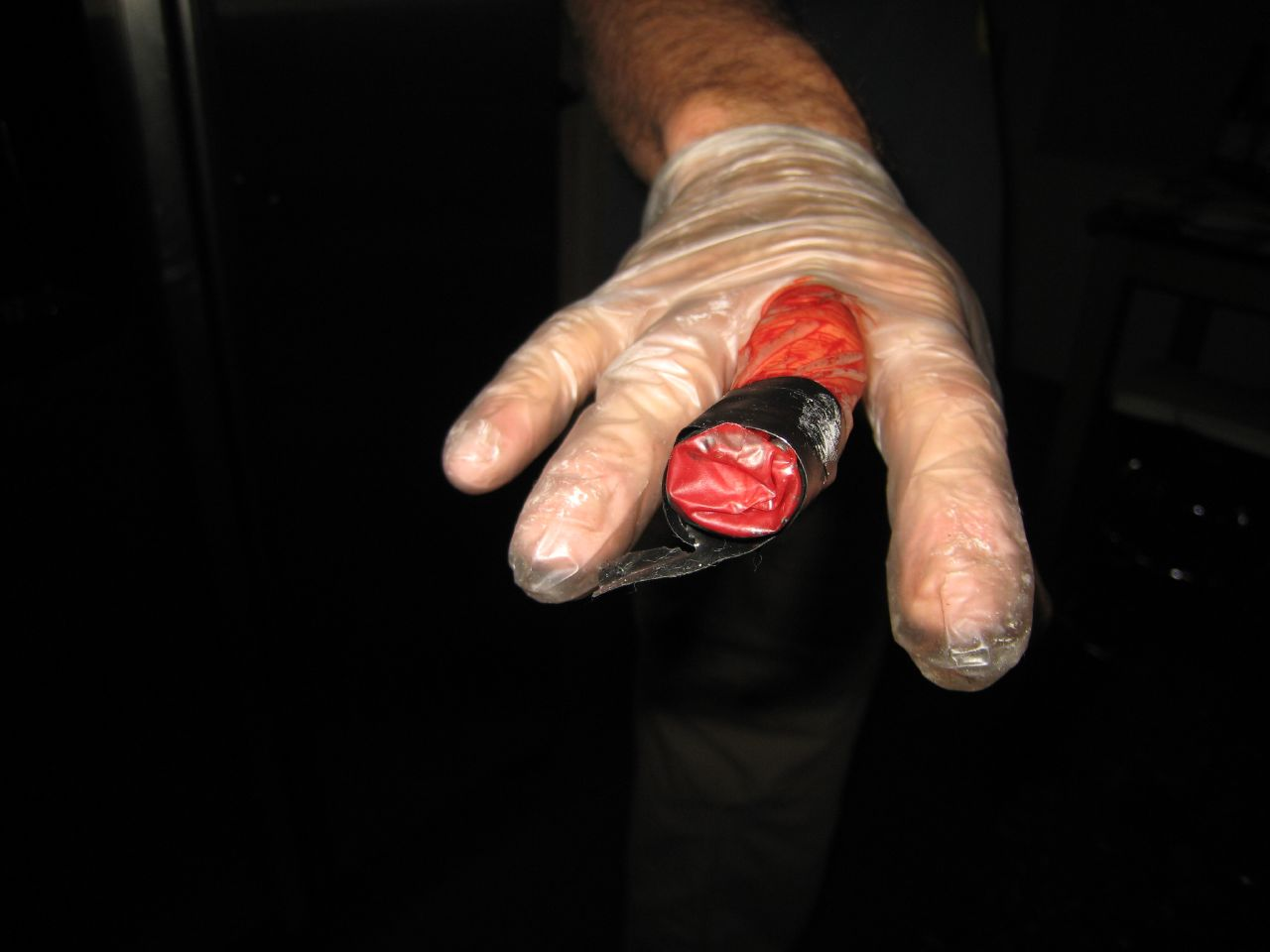
Improvised tourniquet on an accidentally severed finger

Emergency tourniquets are cuff-like devices designed to stop severe traumatic bleeding before or during transport to a care facility. They are wrapped around the limb, proximal to the site of trauma, and tightened until all blood vessels underneath are occluded. The design and construction of emergency tourniquets allows quick application by first aid responders or the injured persons themselves. Correct use of tourniquet devices has been shown to save lives under austere conditions with comparatively low risk of injury. In field trials, prompt application of emergency tourniquets before the patient goes into shock are associated with higher survival rates than any other scenario where tourniquets were used later or not at all.

== Tourniquet design ==
Emergency Tourniquet Devices

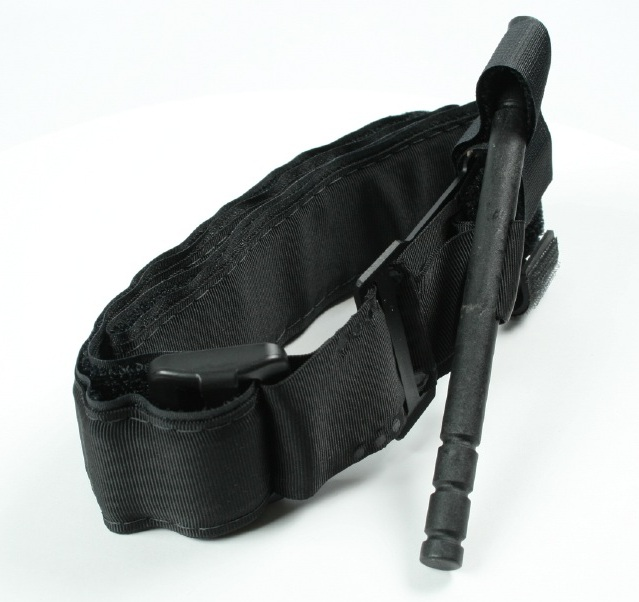
Windlass tourniquet

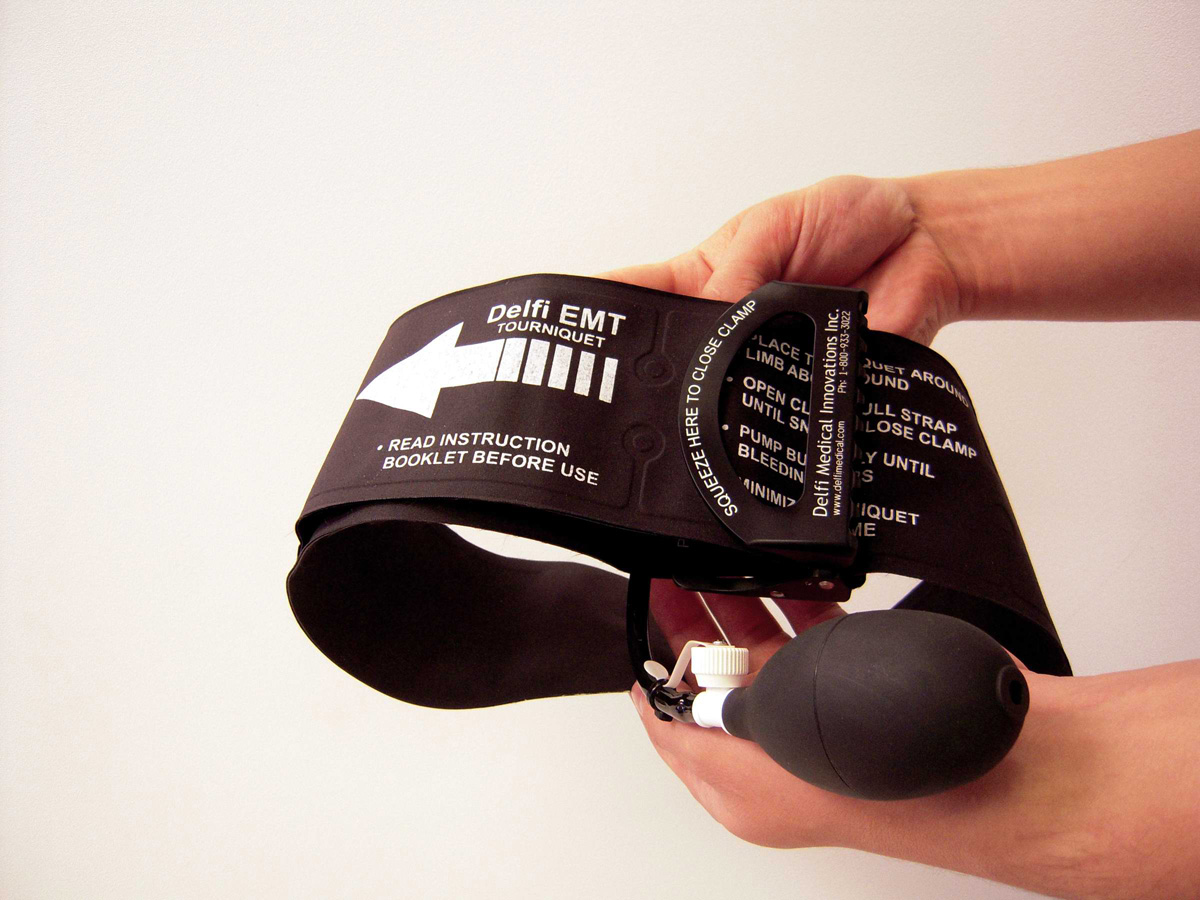
Pneumatic tourniquet

Existing guidelines call for the use of improvised "rope-and-stick" tourniquets as a last resort to stop severe bleeding. However, purpose-made tourniquet devices that are well designed can provide greatly increased safety and efficacy. Variability in performance has been shown to exist between various designs and application methods.

=== Mechanical advantage ===
Mechanisms that confer sufficient mechanical advantage are essential for applying adequate pressure to stop bleeding, particularly on the lower extremities. Pressures that occlude venous but not arterial flow can exacerbate hemorrhage and cause damage to healthy tissue.

==== Mechanical characteristics of emergency tourniquet devices ====
Tourniquet	Strap width (cm)	Mechanism	Note
XFORCE Tourniquet	2.5 - 3.8	Ratchet	Automatic self-securing strap and mechanical ratcheting lever for one finger application
SAM XT Tourniquet	3.7	Windlass	Buckle sets with correct force; windlass finishes pressure
Combat Application Tourniquet (CAT)	3.8	Windlass	Stick and strap inside outer sleeve
Emergency & Military Tourniquet (EMT)	9.1	Pneumatic	Hand pump and inflatable bladder
K^{2} Tactical Tourniquet (K^{2})	3.8	Clamp	Modified wood clamp
Smart Tactical Application Tourniquet (S.T.A.T.)	2.5	Ratchet	Strap with ratcheting mechanism
Last Resort Tourniquet (LRT)	5.1	Ratchet	Strap with ratcheting mechanism
London Bridge Tourniquet (LBT)	2.4	Ratchet	Strap with ratcheting mechanism
Mechanical Advantage Tourniquet (MAT)	3.8	Block and tackle	Pulleys on outer frame
One-Handed Tourniquet (OHT)	2.8	Elastic	Parallel bungee cords and clamp
Self-Applied Tourniquet System (SATS)	3.8	Clamp	Combined clamp and cantilever system
Special Operations Forces Tactical Tourniquet (SOFTT)	3.7	Windlass	Stick and strap
Glia tourniquet	Variable	Windlass	Stick and strap

Most commercial tourniquets cost in the range from $30-$50 (USD). Results from laboratory and field testing suggest that windlass and pneumatic mechanisms are effective where other systems fail due to excessive pain, slipping, inadequate force, or mechanical failure.

=== Pressure gradients ===
Pressure underneath a tourniquet cuff is not evenly distributed, with the highest pressures localized around the cuff center line and decreasing to zero near the cuff edges. A high rate of change of pressure across the cuff width, or a high cuff pressure gradient, is a leading cause of nerve and muscle injury from tourniquet use. Tourniquets with wider straps or cuffs, especially those with pneumatic actuation in contrast to mechanical force, distribute pressure more evenly and produce lower pressure gradients. They are therefore more likely to stop bleeding and less likely to cause damage to underlying tissue, in addition to being significantly less painful than tourniquets with narrow straps and bands. Over pressure protection in certain emergency tourniquets also help to prevent excessive force from damaging the limb.

== Risks ==
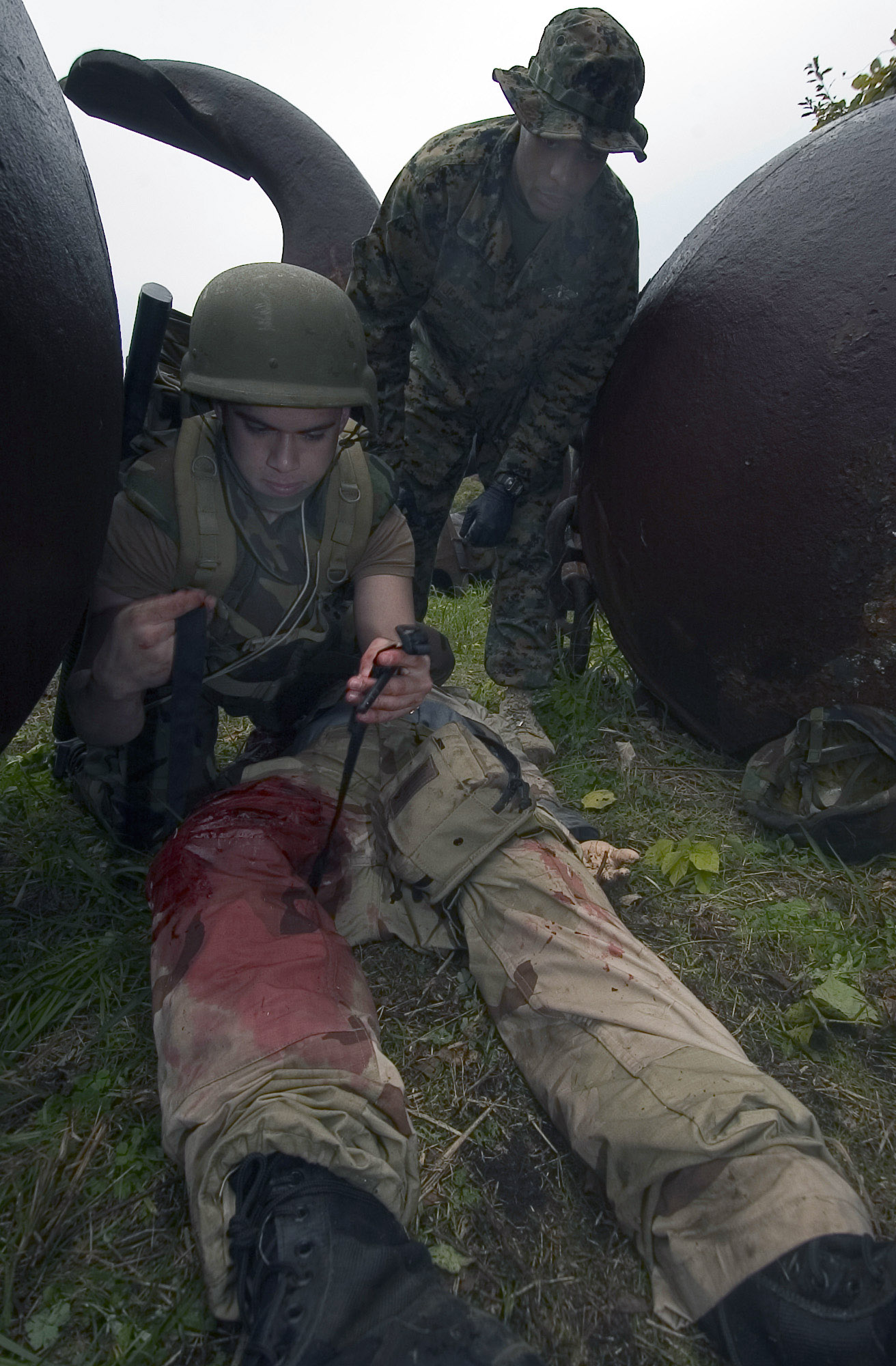
Emergency tourniquet being applied in simulated combat. Military devices are designed for rugged environments.

Possible risks of complications—morbidity—related to emergency tourniquet use include

- amputation or stump shortening
- palsy
- myonecrosis
- pain
- clot
- fasciotomy
- acute renal failure
- rigor
- abscess
- blisters
- abrasions
- contusions
- and pinching.

Emergency care services implementing routine tourniquet use, especially in the civilian setting, should exercise caution and ensure that training is adequate for optimal results. However, given proper precautions, the occurrence of complications due to tourniquet use is quite rare. Designed tourniquet devices are routinely tightened over healthy limbs during training with no ill effects, and recent evidence from combat hospitals in Iraq suggests that morbidity rates are low when users adhere to standard best practices. Since no better alternatives exist for users to self-apply with only basic training, the benefit of tourniquet use far outweighs the risks.

Safe tourniquet practice involves:

1. Careful placement of tourniquet proximal to all sites of hemorrhage.

2. Limiting tourniquet time to less than two hours, if possible.

3. Minimizing excessive applied pressure beyond the point of complete blood flow cessation.

== Current developments ==
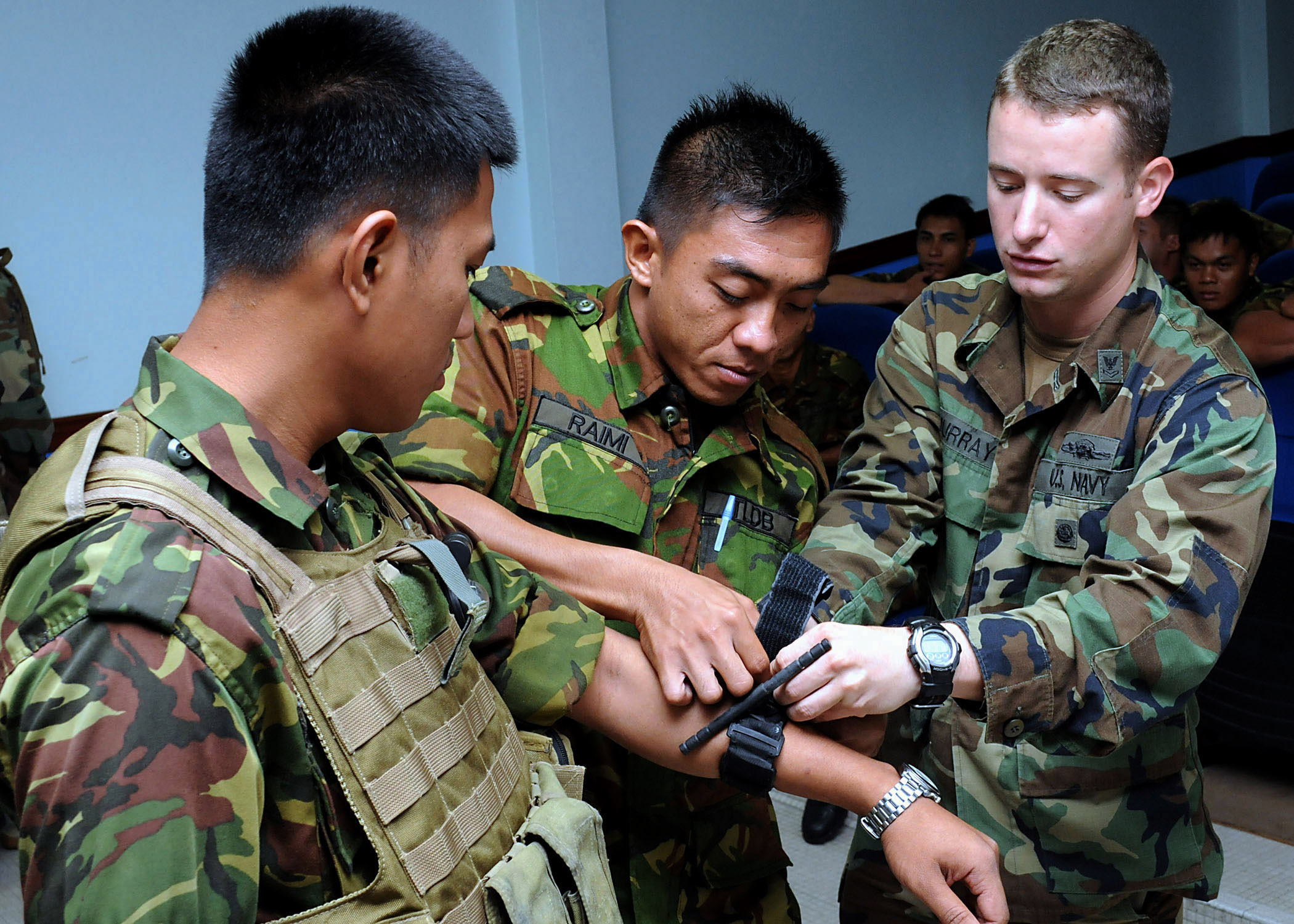
Tourniquet application on the lower arm during training. Device user knowledge greatly increases survival rate and minimizes complications.

=== Field experience ===
Latest field trials suggest that wider straps are more effective and less painful than tourniquets with thinner straps. The concept of limb occlusion pressure is also gaining prominence over the misconception that greater applied force results in greater effectiveness. In addition, studies of failed cases indicate that the correct devices should be coupled with training that facilitates realistic expectations and correct user actions. The Stop The Bleed educational initiative provides knowledge aimed at the greater public on when to use a tourniquet and the correct user actions.

=== Emerging needs ===
Despite the success of widespread tourniquet deployment to limit combat casualties, many preventable deaths from hemorrhage occur where conventional tourniquet use is inappropriate.

The need exists for controlling junctional bleeding, especially in the pelvic area. In 2012, the Combat Ready Clamp (CRoC) was selected by the U.S. Army Institute of Surgical Research (USAISR) for that purpose. Another emerging need is more refined training regimes and doctrine based on scientific evidence, which can ensure that future tourniquet practice and policies are in line with the most current body of knowledge.

== See also ==
- Tourniquet
- Emergency bandage (Israeli bandage)
- Esmarch bandage
