= Hair tourniquet =

- Other names: Toe tourniquet, thread tourniquet syndrome, hair-thread tourniquet syndrome
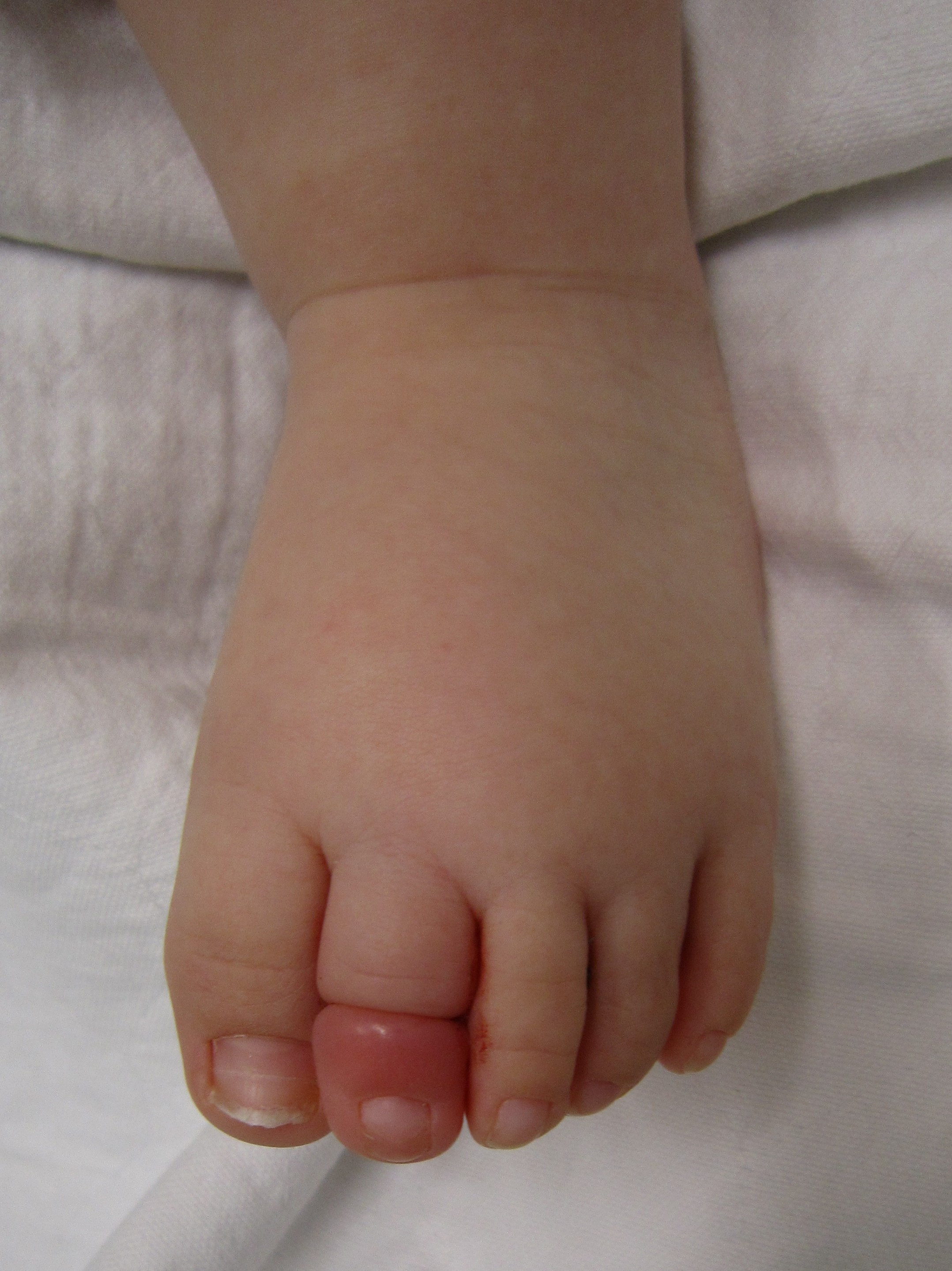
- Hair tourniquet of the second toe
- Specialty: Pediatrics, Emergency Medicine
- Symptoms: Pain and swelling of the affected part
- Complications: Tissue death, autoamputation
- Usual onset: 2 to 6 months of age
- Risk factors: Autism, trichotillomania
- Prevention: Parent keeping long hair brushed and back, washing baby's clothes separately
- Treatment: Substance that breaks down hair, cutting through the hair
- Prognosis: Good with early treatment
- Frequency: Rare

Hair tourniquet is a condition where hair or thread becomes tightly wrapped around most commonly a toe, and occasionally a finger, genitals, or other body parts. This results in pain and swelling of the affected part. Complications can include tissue death due to lack of blood flow. It occurs most commonly among children around 4 months of age, though cases have been described in older children and adults.

Most cases occur accidentally. Risk factors may include autism and trichotillomania. The mechanism is believed to involve wet hair becoming wrapped around a body part and then tightening as it dries. Diagnosis involves examination of the entire child. Prevention is by keeping the parent's hair from contact with the baby such as by the parent keeping their hair brushed and back and washing the baby's clothing separately.

Treatment is with a substance that breaks down hair or cutting through the hair. The condition is rare. Males and females are equally frequently affected. The first medical description dates from 1832. In some cultures thread is tied around the penis of children with bedwetting or for luck.

== Signs and symptoms ==
As this is a condition primarily of young children, symptoms are rarely reported. The child will become suddenly uncomfortable and miserable. As the digit is often inside a sock, the cause may not be clear.

The affected toe can no longer receive an adequate blood supply via the arteries, nor can blood be drained via the veins. The toe will therefore swell and turn blue, indicating ischemia.

The ligature will not stretch in response to the toe swelling and will therefore cut into the skin in more severe cases, like a cheese-wire.

== Treatment ==
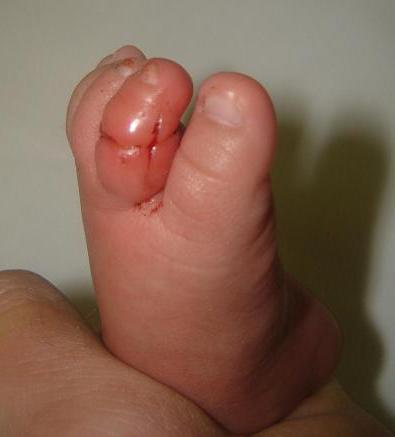
A toe freed of a hair tourniquet. The toe has had to be cut longitudinally to divide the hair

The ligature is cut or dissolved as quickly as possible. Often it is possible to lift a portion of it to enable cutting, but in a severe case the ligature must be cut through the skin. This is, of course, injurious to the child, but may prevent loss of the digit. It must take place on the side of the toe, where there are no nerves or tendons.

Other treatment not requiring minor surgery includes use of a chemical depilatory, such as the over-the-counter product Nair, to dissolve or weaken the hair. This option is not indicated if the hair tourniquet has cut into the skin. Use of depilatory products such as Nair is not an effective treatment on nylon or other fibers that are not human hair.

== Prognosis ==
Loss of the toe is extremely rare, as is any residual disability. Rubber bands can have the same effect.

== Prevention strategies ==
Hair tourniquet syndrome is a highly preventable condition, primarily managed through caregiver education, specific infant apparel practices, and monitoring. Risk factor for hair tourniquets involves maternal postpartum hair loss, mothers are often advised to tie back or cover their hair when in close physical contact with infants to reduces the likelihood of stray hairs inadvertently shedding into the infant's immediate environment. Caregivers are encouraged to regularly inspect clothing items that fully enclose limbs or appendages (such as socks, mittens, and footed onesies) for loose threads, stray hairs, or inner fiber loops. Turning infant garments inside out prior to laundering can prevent hair or thread bundles from gathering inside the closed blind" ends of the clothing. Materials prone to shedding or thread separation should not be placed inside cribs or incubators where an infant might interact with them.

Early detection prevents severe complications like tissue ischemia, urethral damage, or autoamputation. When an infant presents with unexplained, inconsolable crying or irritability, parents and primary care providers should maintain a high index of suspicion and systematically inspect the fingers, toes, and external genitalia for early signs of constriction, redness, or focal edema.

== See also ==
- Tourniquet
