= Unge Frustrerte Menn =

Norwegian rock band

Unge Frustrerte Menn was a rock band from Bergen, Norway.

The band formed in 1991 and broke up in 2002. Their debut album, Slanger og Snegler, was released in 1991. Their last album, Solen Titter Frem – De Beste Sangene (2002), was a compilation album. Despite its break up, and the fact that the band has not released any new material since 2002, it reunites every year to host the traditional Christmas concert 2nd Christmdayas . At the 2009 concert, it was highlighted that this was the tenth consecutive year they had participated in this concert at the Ricks.

== Discography ==
- 1991: Slanger og snegler (Sigma)
- 1995: Doddo og Unge Frustrerte Menn (Tylden & Co.)
- 1996: Sosialantropologi (Lucky Music)
- 1997: Hodet i sanden (Grappa)
- 1998: Øl og Peanøtter (Grappa)
- 2000: Dronningen av Kalde Føtter (Grappa)
- 2002: Solen titter frem – de beste sangene (Grappa)
