= Jacques Champion de Chambonnières =

French harpsichordist, dancer and composer

Jacques Champion de Chambonnières (Jacques Champion, commonly referred to as Chambonnières) (c. 1601/2 – 1672) was a French harpsichordist, dancer and composer. Born into a musical family, Chambonnières made an illustrious career as court harpsichordist in Paris and was considered by many of his contemporaries to be one of the greatest musicians in Europe. However, late in life Chambonnières gradually fell out of favor at the court and lost his position. He died in poverty, but at an advanced age, and not before publishing a number of his works. Today Chambonnières is considered one of the greatest representatives of the early French harpsichord school.

== Life ==
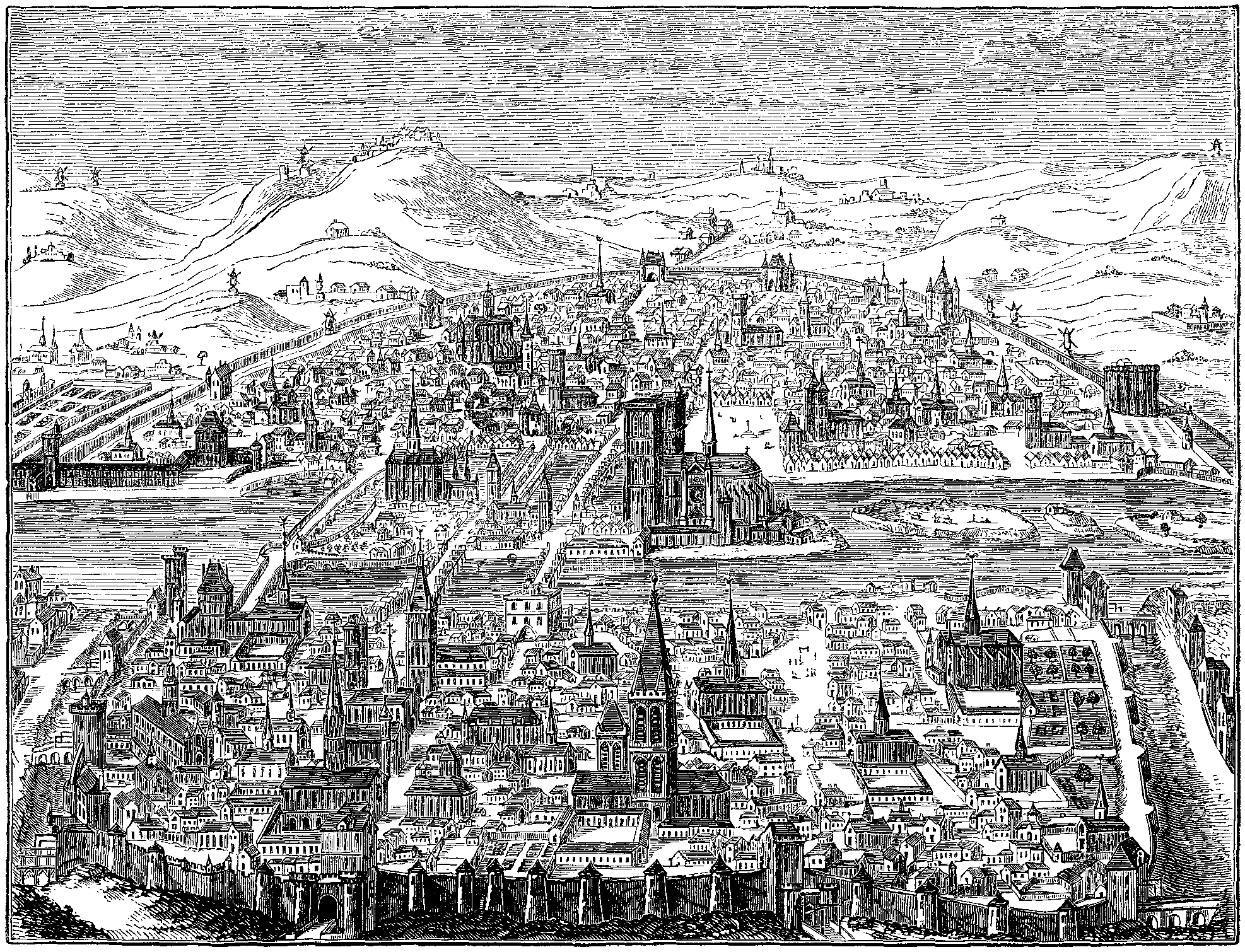
View of Paris in 1607, copperplate engraving by Leonard Gaultier.

=== 1601–1631: Early years ===
Chambonnières was born in Paris, most probably in 1601 or 1602. Very little information survives concerning his childhood and early youth. The Champion family included many musicians, most notably Thomas Champion (also known as Mithou; not to be confused with his English namesake), Chambonnières's grandfather, whom Marin Mersenne described as "the greatest contrapuntist of his time." Chambonnières's father, also named Jacques, was also a keyboard player and a composer. Although he was not as highly regarded as Thomas, Mersenne still praised his keyboard skills, and John Bull dedicated a work to him. The title Chambonnières originally belonged to Chambonnières's maternal grandfather: it was the name of a small manor in the commune of Le Plessis-Feu-Aussoux. Chambonnières must have received early music lessons from his father, but apart from that nothing is known about the young harpsichordist's education. What is known, however, is that Chambonnières was for a long time the only child of an aging father—Jacques Champion was around 50 when Chambonnières was born—and received much attention.

Already by 1611 Chambonnières must have been showing considerable musical talents, for in September of that year he received the reversion of his father's court position. Some ten years later, about 1621/22, Chambonnières married his first wife Marie Leclerc. He continued receiving generous financial support from his father until some time in the mid-1620s, when Jacques Champion's wife unexpectedly gave birth to two more children: a daughter (Louise) and another son (Nicolas, or Jehan-Nicolas). Jacques, apparently mindful of both the diminishing family fortune and his elder son's selfish character, sought to distribute the remaining money and resources in a fair manner. In 1631 he completed and signed a document that has since become one of the most important sources of biographical information on the Champion family: a déclaration which detailed family circumstances and, among other things, ordered Chambonnières to pay 3000 livres to his mother, brother and sister as a repayment for the court position and other benefits provided to him by his father.

=== 1632–1657: Rise to fame and subsequent career ===
With support from his father, Chambonnières was probably working at the court since his late teens. By 1632 he had the title of gentilhomme ordinaire de la Chambre du Roy. He rose to great fame in the early 1630s, first as harpsichordist and then, a little later, as a dancer. His first public performance was in the Ballet de la marine, on 25 February 1635, before the King himself. In 1637 Chambonnières's salary was the same as his father's, and soon after the latter's death in 1642 Chambonnières became the only harpsichordist. His activities were not limited to providing music for the court, however. In 1641 he organized a series of paying concerts—perhaps the very first of such kind in France—which probably continued well into the 1650s. The earliest relevant notarial act, from 17 October 1641, specifies that ten musicians were to perform every Wednesday and Saturday at noon for a year. Both vocal and instrumental works were performed, but no details survive on the nature of the music or the instruments used.

Chambonnières augmented his income also by teaching, eventually becoming an important influence on the subsequent development of the French harpsichord school, as well as composers abroad, such as Johann Jakob Froberger. Among his pupils were Jacques Hardel and Jean-Henri d'Anglebert, but he was particularly important for his contribution to the establishment of the Couperin musical dynasty. About 1650/51 Louis Couperin and his brothers gave a small private concert at Chambonnières's Le Plessis-Feu-Aussoux manor, to celebrate the older composer's name day. Their playing and their music (which was composed by Louis) so impressed Chambonnières that he extended all kinds of support to the Couperins and the three soon had active careers in Paris.

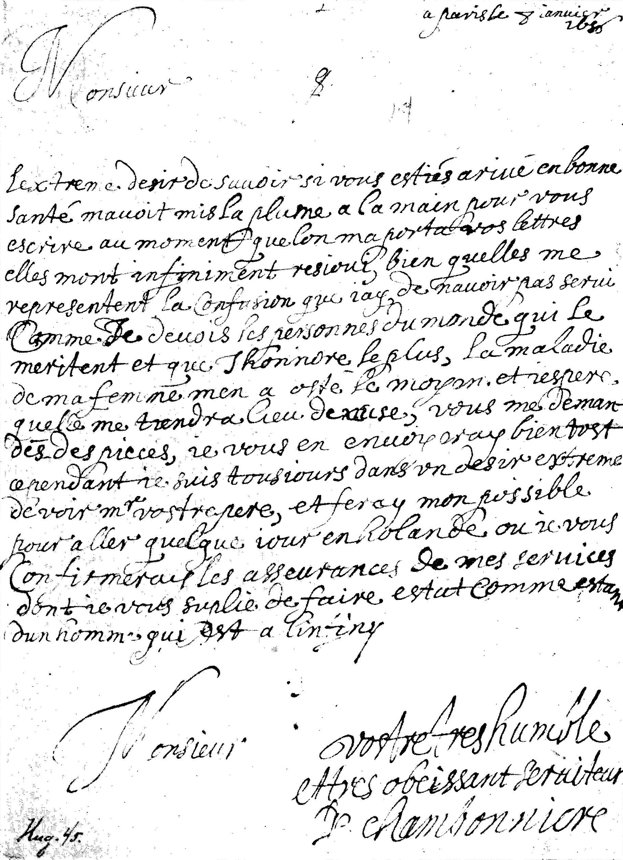
Chambonnières's only extant letter, to Christiaan Huygens. Dated 8 January 1656, it shows Chambonnières's continuing interest in making a journey to the north.

Chambonnières's wife died in the early 1650s. He married his second wife Marguerite Ferret, daughter of a law court usher, on 16 December 1652. As the Fronde civil war went on, Chambonnières's career was still on the rise. He continued augmenting his income by giving concerts and teaching, and at one point considered going on a tour of Brabant. A series of concerts titled Assemblée des honnestes curieux was given in the mid-1650s; those given in autumn 1655 were attended by Christiaan Huygens. Chambonnières's dancing career continued, too: on 23 February 1653 he danced in the Ballet royal de la nuit, side by side with the young Louis XIV and Jean-Baptiste Lully, and on 14 April 1654 he participated in the ballet inserted into Carlo Caproli's opera Le nozze di Peleo e di Theti. Chambonnières's harpsichord works were appearing already in manuscript collections dating from the late 1650s, but he had not yet published any of his music.

=== 1657–1672: Dwindling fortunes ===
Chambonnières's financial situation probably ceased to be stable already in the early 1650s, when the Fronde armies laid the Brie region to waste. The first serious losses, however, must have occurred in 1657, when a lawsuit was brought that resulted in the sale of Chambonnières's manor and land at Le Plessis-Feu-Aussoux, for a comparatively small sum. In the summer his wife Marguerite obtained a decree of separate maintenance and sold some of the composer's property. The first serious blow to Chambonnières's career was landed also in 1657, by the King, who engaged Étienne Richard as the royal harpsichord teacher, thereby injuring Chambonnières's pride and making his position at the court less secure. Many decades later Évrard Titon du Tillet described a plot that existed at the court to remove Chambonnières from his position and replace him with Louis Couperin. This failed, however, since Couperin refused to take up the post out of loyalty to his benefactor and friend.

By the end of the year 1660 Chambonnières was calling himself a marquis, but he still experienced financial problems. He and his wife were still living together despite her earlier activities; his court position was constantly under threat from what he called, in a letter, a "low and evil clique", and his pension was cut off, apparently by the same people. On 23 October 1662 Chambonnières retired and sold the reversion of his post to d'Anglebert for 2000 livres. The latter was to assume all duties immediately, but would receive none of the emoluments. According to violist Jean Rousseau, Chambonnières's contemporary, the composer was obliged to resign since he could not execute basso continuo accompaniment. Many of Chambonnières's misfortunes were almost certainly brought on by the appointment of Jean-Baptiste Lully as Surintendant de la musique de la chambre: learning to perform basso continuo still would have diminished Chambonnières's status at the court, reducing him to a small part of Lully's orchestral force. After his retirement, Chambonnières must have continued to perform in order to make a living, but only a single record of a concert survives, that for 1 November 1665 at the Duchess of Orleans' salon. He published two volumes of harpsichord pieces in 1670 and died two years later, in difficult financial circumstances. The posthumous inventory of his property survives, listing furniture, tapestries, etc., in mediocre condition, as well as four keyboard instruments: two harpsichords (one probably a two-manual instrument), a spinet and a regal.

== Work ==
Les pièces de clavessin [...] livre premier. Paris, 1670. (complete score)

Due to lack of manuscript sources, little is known about French harpsichord music of the first half of the 17th century, and Chambonnières emerges as the sole major composer of the time with a large surviving oeuvre. Some 150 pieces are extant, almost all of them dances. Sixty were published by the composer himself in 1670 in two volumes of Les pièces de clavessin, and the rest are known through some 20 manuscript sources, most of which were discovered only in the mid- and late 20th century. Two of these are of particular importance: the famous Bauyn manuscript and a manuscript in the collection of Guy Oldham in London. The Bauyn manuscript includes, among other pieces, alternative versions of almost all the published works. The Oldham manuscript contains 22 pieces by Chambonnières, 13 of which may be in Chambonnières's hand, and at least one (Allemande Le moutier) was apparently composed into the manuscript. Chambonnières's style formed under the influence of earlier and contemporary harpsichordists such as Étienne Richard and Pierre de la Barre, and more importantly, lutenists such as René Mesangeau, Germain Pinel, Ennemond Gaultier, and Denis Gaultier. Since the exact course of evolution of the classic French harpsichord style remains a mystery, it is impossible to ascertain the role Chambonnières played in establishing said style. He was obviously influenced by the French lute school, adapting its style brisé to the harpsichord, and he may have been among the first to do so. Another important influence was a thorough grounding in counterpoint, probably transmitted from his grandfather Thomas through his father.

The vast majority of Chambonnières's pieces are allemandes, courantes, sarabandes, and gigues, standard dance types of the era. The courantes completely outnumber all other genres: there are more than 60 of them. Also extant are Chambonnières's forays into other dance types, the most important of which are four pavanes and three or four chaconnes. No preludes by Chambonnières exist, although the genre was very popular: indeed, he is the only major composer of the period who has none to his credit (although nine anonymous unmeasured preludes from the manuscript B-Bc 27220 may have been composed by him). Numerous pieces exist in several versions, which presents considerable problems for scholars and performers, since the versions may differ dramatically. The Bauyn manuscript versions of the published works, for instance, are almost completely unornamented, whereas the published versions abound in ornaments. One particularly striking example is the Pavane L'entretien des Dieux. It has a single trill in the Bauyn version, while in the published version that very trill is omitted—but 62 other ornaments appear. Another example, Sarabande Jeunes zéphirs, is found in 11 sources, and no two versions are identical. Finally, the grouping of the pieces is another problem for scholars. Chambonnières chose to publish his works as suites defined by key; frequently there are musical connections between the pieces of a single suite. However, such suites are absent from manuscript sources, where pieces appear grouped by key only and do not form suites.

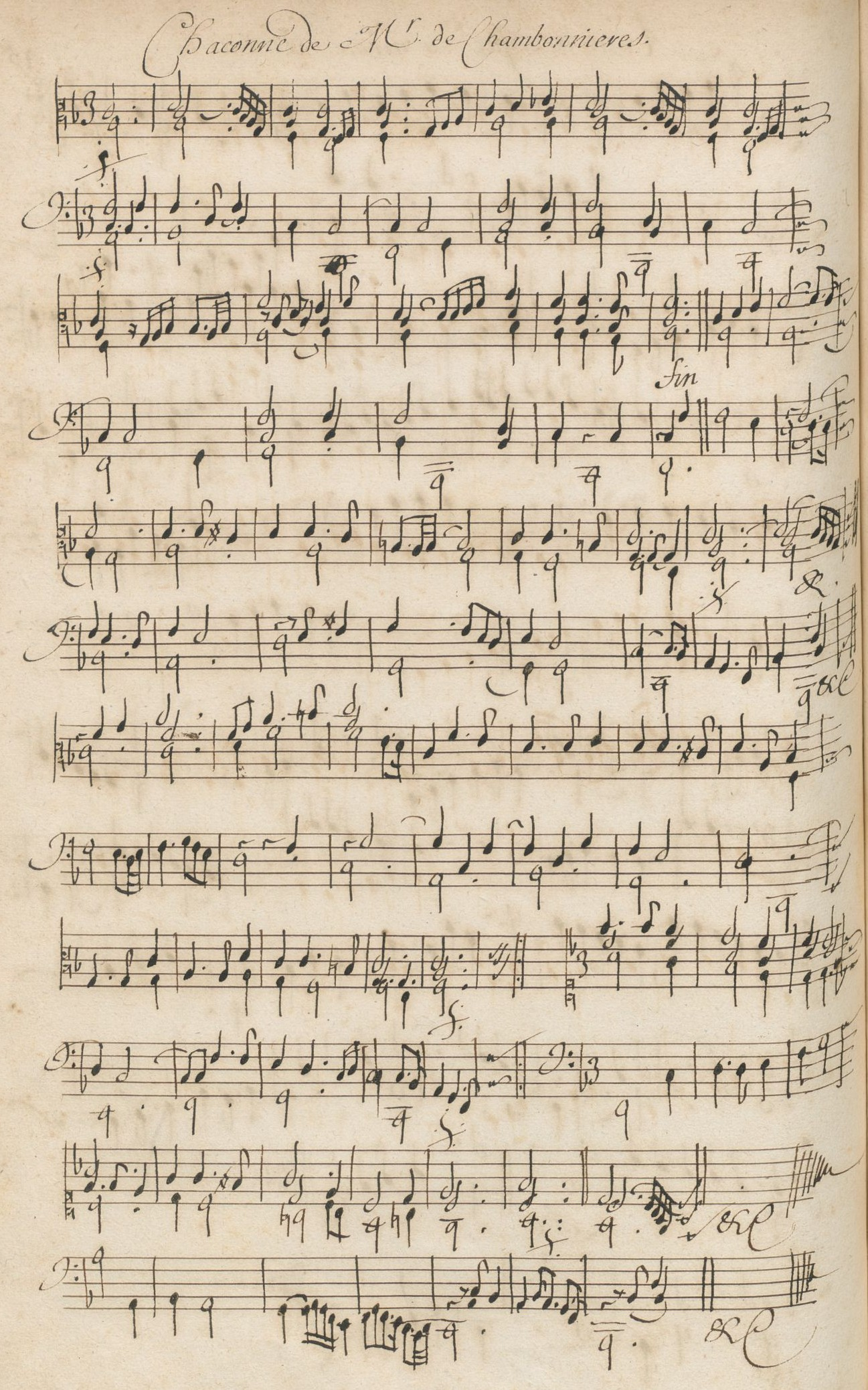
Described as "one of Chambonnières' most beautiful works and deservedly one of his most famous" by Willi Apel, the F major chaconne is seen here as preserved in the famous Bauyn manuscript.

Mersenne justly praised Chambonnières for "lovely melodies and fine accompanying parts mingled together" and "beauty of rhythm", and indeed Chambonnières's strong sense of melodic line was one of the defining characteristics of his music. Broad, sweeping melodies frequently inform whole strains of his allemandes and courantes. However, beneath the pleasing melodic surface there frequently is a substantial degree of polyphonic complexity, and carefully concealed contrapuntal devices are quite common in Chambonnières's works even if most of the pieces are more homophonic rather than fully polyphonic. Such structural connections are not uncommon in Chambonnières's suites, and sometimes they define subgroups in manuscript collections: the three courantes of the third suite of the livre premier are a prime example, linked by a scale motif both in the published versions and in the Oldham manuscript, where they too appear together, in the same sequence. The same suite has more examples of imitative counterpoint worked into the dance texture, e.g., in the final gigue and in the thematic importance of the tenor voice in the three- and four-part textures of the first few pieces.

== Selected discography ==
Since the advent of period performance practice in the 20th century, Chambonnières' works have been recorded by a number of harpsichordists. Such recordings, some of which have been reissued several times, include the following:

- 1979. Kenneth Gilbert. Livre premier de clavecin, on a 1747 harpsichord by Sebastien Garnier. Decca / Argo, ZK 80
- 1985. Françoise Lengellé. Pièces pour clavecin, on two harpsichords by David Ley, copies of historic instruments by Ruckers and Blanchet. Lyrinx LYR 066
- 1992. Skip Sempé. Pièces de clavecin, on a c. 1680 Flemish harpsichord. BMG / DHM 05472 77453 2
- 2003. Olivier Baumont. Les Pieces de Clavessin, on a late 17th-century French harpsichord. This is the earliest complete recording of the music Chambonnières published in his lifetime, and it also includes a number of manuscript pieces. AS Musique / AS Productions ASM 00
- 2016. Franz Silvestri, Harpsichord Suites, a 2-CD set of eight suites, one each in the tonalities used by Chambonniers. Issued by Brilliant Classics. Performed on a 2014 instrument by Andrea Di Maio, after Vaudry, 1681; a two-manual harpsichord.
