= Louis Couperin =

French Baroque composer and performer

Louis Couperin (French: [lwi kupʁɛ̃]; c. 1626 – 29 August 1661) was a French Baroque composer and performer. He was born in Chaumes-en-Brie and moved to Paris in 1650–1651 with the help of Jacques Champion de Chambonnières. Couperin worked as organist of the Church of St. Gervais in Paris and as musician at the court. He quickly became one of the most prominent Parisian musicians, establishing himself as a harpsichordist, organist, and violist, but his career was cut short by his early death at the age of thirty-five.

None of Couperin's music was published during his lifetime, but manuscript copies of some 200 pieces (which have historically been attributed wholly to him despite a lack of evidence) survive, some of them only rediscovered in the mid-20th century. The first historically important member of the Couperin family, Couperin made contributions to the development of both the French organ school and the French harpsichord school. His innovations included composing organ pieces for specific registrations and inventing the genre of the unmeasured prelude for harpsichord, for which he devised a special type of notation.

== Life ==
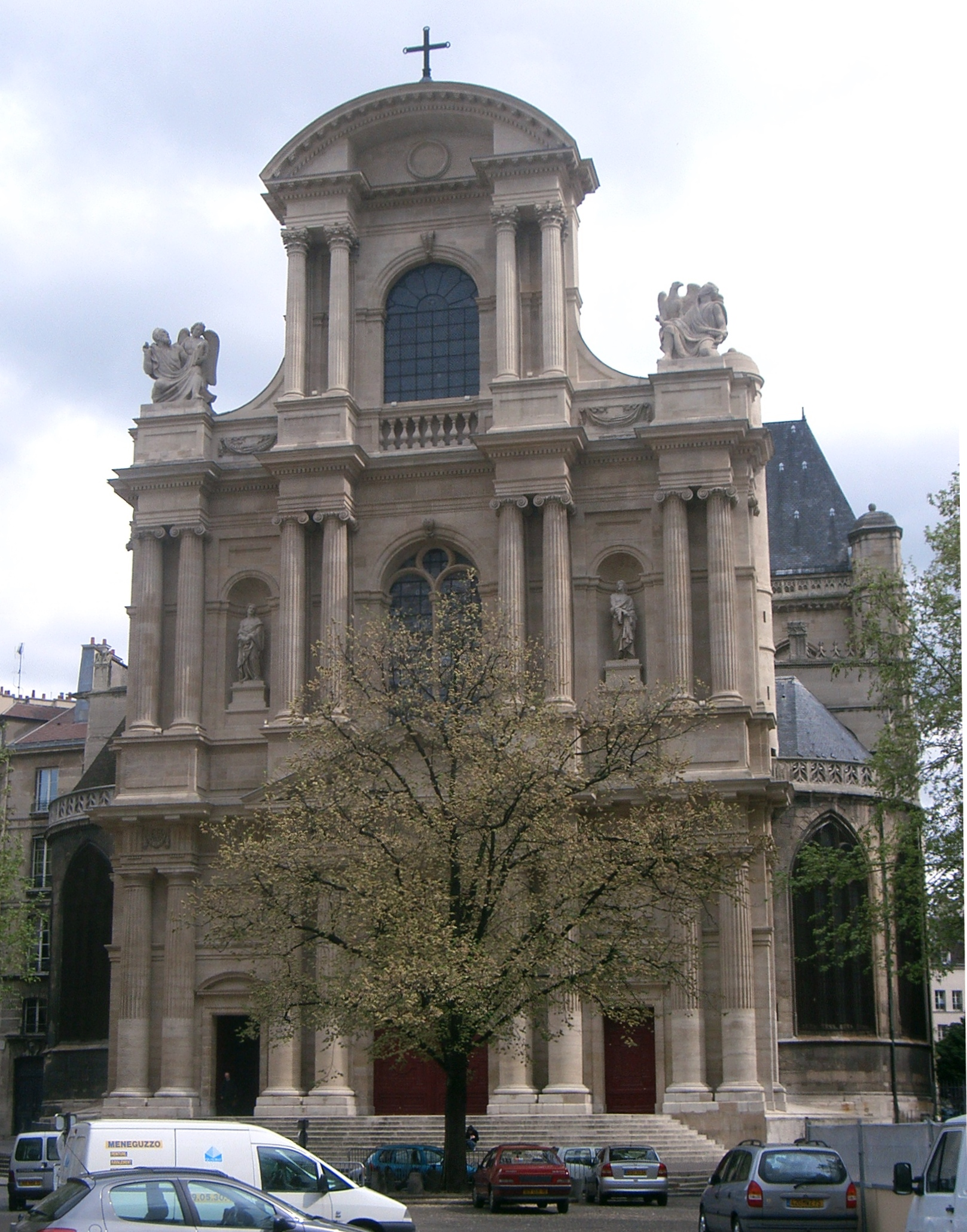
The church of St-Gervais-et-St-Protais in Paris, where Louis Couperin served as organist from 1653 until his death.

Most of the information about Couperin's life comes from two sources. Le Parnasse François, a 1732 book by Évrard Titon du Tillet, contains a biographical sketch describing certain details of his life, and some 30 organ pieces listed not only the date but also the place of composition. Couperin was born around 1626 in Chaumes-en-Brie, a town 40 km south-east of Paris. His father, Charles Couperin, sieur de Crouilly, was a small landowner and part-time organist of a local church. Louis was reportedly an accomplished harpsichordist and violinist by 1650 (and was already composing by then), but had no connections whatsoever with any important musicians of the era. His sudden rise to fame, which happened during 1650–1651, is explained in Le Parnasse François. Titon du Tillet writes that Louis, his two younger brothers Charles and François, and some of their friends visited Jacques Champion de Chambonnières on the Feast of Saint James—Chambonnières' name day. The Couperins offered the host and his guests a short concert, playing several pieces composed by Louis. Chambonnières was impressed by Louis Couperin's talents, became his teacher and persuaded him to settle in Paris. There Chambonnières, who was the most prominent French harpsichordist of his time and musician to the King, introduced the young musician to the Court. Couperin's talents met with appreciation; by 1651 he was already living in the city.

He almost certainly met Johann Jakob Froberger in 1651–1652; Froberger's style becoming a major influence on Couperin's music. On 9 April 1653 he became organist of the Parisian church of St. Gervais, where he was paid 400 livres a year, plus lodgings. The position at this ancient church was one of the most important in France at the time. At some point — most probably after he became organist at St. Gervais — Couperin entered the royal service as a treble viol player. Titon du Tillet writes that Couperin had refused, out of loyalty to his old friend and teacher, to replace Chambonnières as royal harpsichordist, and so the post of violist was created especially for him. On 22 October 1655, he stood godfather to his sister's child at Chaumes-en-Brie; from July to October 1656 and around November 1658 he was frequently travelling to Meudon, where he was probably employed by Abel Servien, a diplomat and statesman. He traveled to Toulouse with the court in 1659. During his last years, Couperin lived in the organist's lodgings at St. Gervais with his two brothers. He died on 29 August 1661, aged thirty-five according to Le Parnasse François.

His brothers both played an important role in the development of French Baroque music. No compositions by François (known as "The Elder" or "Couperin de Crouilly") are known to survive, but his line of the family carried the name of Couperin into the 19th century. Charles Couperin (known as "Couperin-cadet") succeeded Louis as organist at St. Gervais and, in 1668, produced an only child, François Couperin le Grand, who became one of the most important French composers of the late Baroque era.

== Works ==
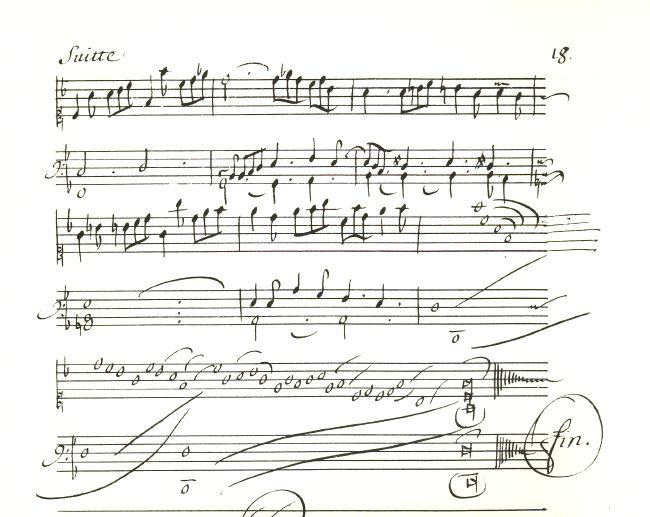
Fragment of a page from the Bauyn manuscript, showing the conclusion of the unmeasured Prélude in F major (Bauyn 12)

=== Provenance and catalogues ===
Because his career spanned only some 10 years, none of Couperin's works were published during his lifetime. There are two major manuscript sources for his music:

1. The Bauyn manuscript (Bibliothèque nationale de France, Rés. Vm7 674–675), dating from ca. 1690, is one of the most important sources for French keyboard music of the 17th century (particularly the work of Chambonnières). It contains 122 harpsichord pieces by Couperin, as well as four organ pieces and 5 chamber works.
2. The so-called Oldham manuscript (a private collection of G. Oldham), recovered only in 1957, contains 70 organ works by Couperin, of which 68 are unique to this source. Also included are a harpsichord suite, four five-part chamber fantaisies, and two pieces for shawm band. This manuscript may have been compiled at least partly during Couperin's lifetime, and is the only such source for his music.

In addition to these, the Parville manuscript contains 55 harpsichord pieces by Couperin, although only five of these are unique (the rest are included in the Bauyn manuscript).

Couperin's harpsichord works are commonly referred to by numbers used in the princeps Éditions de l'Oiseau-Lyre edition of 1936. The edition was based entirely on the Bauyn manuscript, the only source known at that time. The authors of the manuscript did not arrange the pieces in suites, but rather grouped dances by key first and by genre second. So, for example, numbers 16–19 are courantes in C major, numbers 20–25 are sarabandes in C major, etc. Some editions and recordings may use Davitt Moroney's alternative numbering scheme, which attempts to create suites out of Couperin's dances.

The numbering scheme for Couperin's organ pieces also reflects their source, the Oldham manuscript. Here, however, no attempt was made by the copyist to group pieces in any way. The manuscript draws on at least two grands livres d'orgue, and the copyist apparently chose pieces arbitrarily. Distinguishing the many fantaisies is made easier, however, because Couperin would frequently provide the date and sometimes the place of composition in a footnote. Numbers 11 and 19, for instance, are both titled "fugue", but the former is inscribed "Couperin a Meudon le 18e Juillet [July] 1656", and the latter "Couperin a paris le 1er 7ber [September] 1656". This extraordinary feature, which is unique for the period, allows tracing Couperin's development as organ composer from 1650 to 1659, sometimes almost day by day.

Harpsichordist Skip Sempé, as well as a few scholars, have questioned the attribution of both the harpsichord pieces of the Bauyn manuscript and the organ pieces of the Oldham manuscript to Couperin, on stylistic grounds.

=== Harpsichord music ===
Chaconne in d-minor, recorded by Richard Siegel

Dance movements comprise around two thirds of Louis Couperin's harpsichord oeuvre; they include courantes, sarabandes, allemandes and gigues (in decreasing order of numbers). These pieces are more complex than those by Chambonnières and display more variety within an individual piece. These pieces were not organized into suites, but contemporary performers arrange pieces in the same key into ad hoc suites for a given performance or recording. His reputation as a composer comes mainly from his chaconnes, passacaglias and unmeasured preludes. These latter pieces, written out in a unique kind of notation (whole notes only, arranged in groups and connected by graceful curves) are influenced by Froberger's free-flowing allemandes and programmatic pieces; some borrow short passages from his toccatas.

=== Organ music ===
Couperin's organ music exerted a great influence over 17th century European composers; it represents the transition from the strict counterpoint in the Titelouze vein to the colorful, concertante organ style introduced by Guillaume-Gabriel Nivers and Nicolas Lebègue, who influenced late Baroque composers such as François Couperin and Nicolas de Grigny. Couperin was the first French composer to write for specific registrations and also the first to compose leaping division basses in the style of divisions for the bass viol. Both of these stylistic traits are among the defining characteristics of French organ music of the 17th and the 18th centuries.

== Editions ==
- Louis Couperin: Oeuvres de clavecin. Second modern edition, edited by Davitt Moroney. Éditions de l'Oiseau-Lyre, Monaco, OL 58 (1985, reprinted in 2004). Moroney omits the ornaments included in the first edition, since they were not contemporary with Louis Couperin. Moroney's lengthy introduction is, to date, the best biographical source on Couperin in English.
- Louis Couperin: Pièces d' orgue. Transcribed and edited by Guy Oldham. Éditions de l'Oiseau-Lyre, Monaco, OL 300 (2003). 144 pages. This volume contains the musical text of 70 pieces, "as well as the relevant plainchant melodies with their texts to facilitate alternatim performance, a facsimile page, editor's notes, and a Critical Commentary." (Out of print.) A companion publication has been planned (but never published), consisting of extended prefatory material, including a technical description of the source, information on the organs played by Louis Couperin, and suggestions for performance.
