= Jacques Hardel =

French composer and harpsichordist

Jacques Hardel (died March 1678) was a French composer and harpsichordist.

He came from a family that included two noted instrument makers: his grandfather Gilles Hardel (fl. ca. 1611) and his father Guillaume Hardel (died 1676), who was a lute maker and a well-established harpsichordist—in 1673–4 he served as harpsichord teacher to the daughter of Philippe d'Orléans. Practically nothing is known about Jacques Hardel's life. He was a pupil of Jacques Champion de Chambonnières and achieved a very high reputation at the court, at one point giving concerts for the King every week, performing together with the lutenist Porion. For several years he lived together with a pupil, a "Gautier" who remains unidentified today. The two men shared a close friendship, and Hardel bequeathed all of his works to Gautier.

Only eight pieces by Hardel are extant today. These are a courante for lute, a six-movement harpsichord suite in D minor, and a harpsichord gavotte. All of the harpsichord works are of the highest quality, displaying Hardel's perfect grasp of his teacher's techniques, particularly Chambonnières's strong sense of the melodic line, which in Hardel's works is augmented with advanced bass writing, tightening the harmony and working towards a more progressive sound. The suite, which consists of an allemande, three courantes, a sarabande, and a gigue, is one of the earliest examples of a complete "classical" French suite. The lute courante may be a transcription of a lost harpsichord piece.
