= Étienne Richard =

French composer, organist and harpsichordist

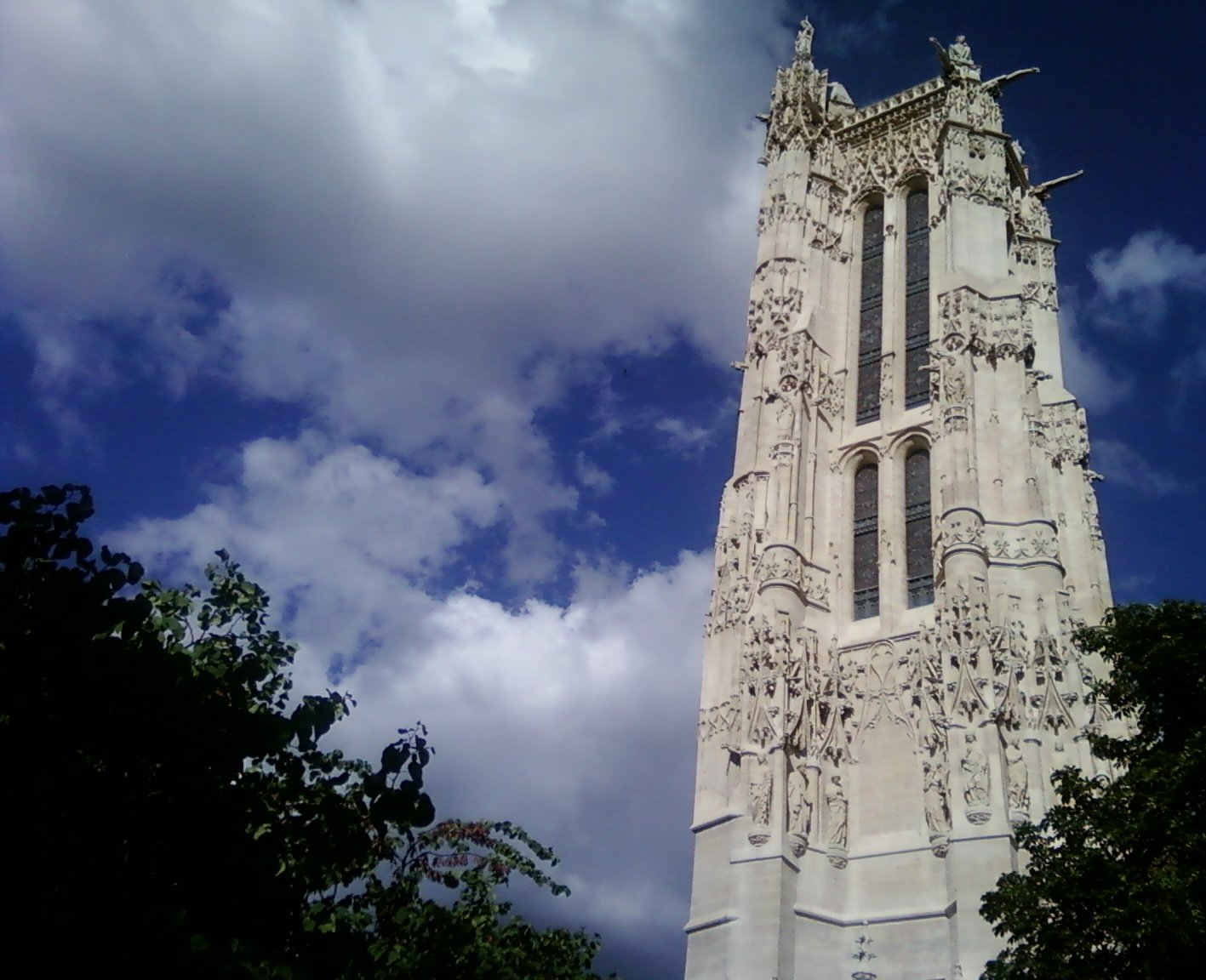
The Saint-Jacques Tower is all that remains of the church of Saint-Jacques-de-la-Boucherie, where Richard worked from 1652 until his death.

Étienne Richard (c. 1621 – 1669) was a French composer, organist and harpsichordist. Very little is known about his life and work.

He was born in Paris and came from a family of organists; apparently he lived and worked in Paris all his life. From 1645 he and his brother Charles were organists to Chancellor Séguier. In 1651 he succeeded his father as organist of the Church of Saint-Nicolas-des-Champs in Paris, working together with Nicolas Gigault. In 1652 Etienne lost both his brother and his father. The same year he succeeded the former as organist of Saint-Jacques-de-la-Boucherie, and three years later, in 1655, he took his father's position at Saint-Martin-des-Champs. His career soared by the end of the 1650s, and in 1657 he was employed as harpsichordist and teacher to the King. He also played viola and served as violist to the King's brother. Richard died in Paris in 1669, possibly in May.

Although he was exceptionally well regarded at the court, only a few works by Richard survive (and some could be attributed to Charles, Pierre, or another member of either of the two Richard families of musicians that were active in Paris at the time): two organ preludes, four allemandes, three courantes, two sarabandes and two gigues, which came to us through the Bauyn manuscript. These pieces all show Richard as an excellent composer who had thoroughly mastered counterpoint and harmony. The organ preludes successfully combine the older, contrapuntal style of Jean Titelouze with the special attention given to the melody—a progressive trait, since French organ music was later dominated by a melody-based approach. One of the preludes contains several sections, while the other does not. Of the dance movements, the allemandes are historically important for showing the beginnings of the ornamented style that later French composers used extensively. The gigues exhibit unusual characteristics: one is written in the typical triple metre, but closes with a refrain in 2/2 time. The other gigue is in 2/2 time throughout and is virtually indistinguishable from an allemande.
