= Baroque music =

Style of Western classical music

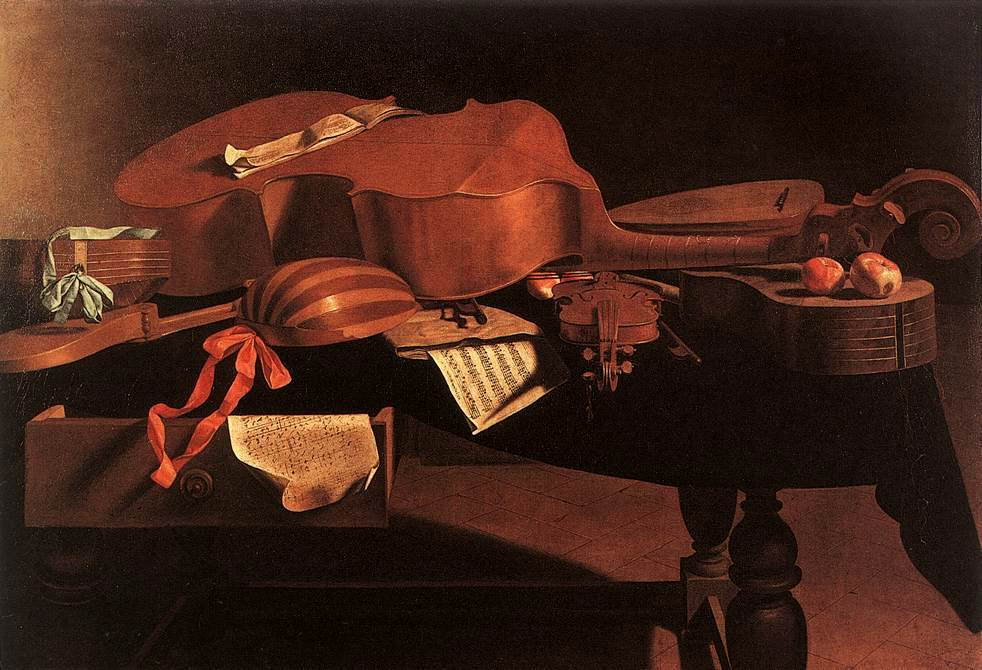
Painting by Evaristo Baschenis of Baroque instruments, including a cittern, viola da gamba, violin, and two lutes

Baroque music (UK: /bəˈrɒk/ or US: /bəˈroʊk/) refers to the period or dominant style of Western classical music composed from about 1600 to 1750. The Baroque style followed the Renaissance period, and was followed in turn by the Classical period after a short transition (the galant style). Baroque music forms a major portion of the "classical music" canon, and continues to be widely studied, performed, and listened to. Key composers of the Baroque era include Jacopo Peri, who wrote the first operas; Alessandro Stradella, who originated the concerto grosso style; and Arcangelo Corelli, who was one of the first composers to publish widely and have his music performed across Europe.

The Baroque period saw the formalization of common-practice tonality, an approach to writing music in which a song or piece is written in a particular key; this type of harmony has continued to be used extensively in Western classical and popular music. Baroque composers experimented with finding a fuller sound for each instrumental part, leading to the creation of the modern orchestra; modernised musical notation, including developing figured bass; and developed new instrumental playing techniques. Baroque music expanded the size, range, and complexity of instrumental performance, and also established the mixed vocal/instrumental forms of opera, cantata and oratorio and the instrumental forms of the solo concerto and sonata as musical genres. Dense, complex polyphonic music, in which multiple independent melody lines were performed simultaneously, was characteristic of the Baroque period.

During the Baroque era professional musicians were expected to be accomplished improvisers of both solo melodic lines and accompaniment parts. Baroque concerts were typically accompanied by a basso continuo group, in which bass instruments such as viol, cello, or double bass played the bassline. A characteristic Baroque form was the dance suite.

== Definition ==
The French word baroque is derived from the Portuguese barroco, meaning an irregularly-shaped pearl. Although it was long thought that the word as a critical term was first applied to architecture, in fact it appears earlier in reference to music, in an anonymous, satirical review of the première in October 1733 of Rameau's Hippolyte et Aricie, printed in the Mercure de France in May 1734. The critic implied that the novelty in this opera was "du barocque", complaining that the music lacked coherent melody, was filled with unremitting dissonaque pearls, when diamonds can be found on the surface of the earth". Jean-Jacques Rousseau wrote in 1768 in the Encyclopédie: "Baroque music is that in which the harmony is confused, and loaded with modulations and dissonances. The singing is harsh and unnatural, the intonation difficult, and the movement limited." (Note: Rousseau suggests that the term baroque comes from the philosophical term baroco, in use since the 13th century to describe a type of elaborate and, for some, unnecessarily complicated academic argument. This etymology is no longer considered credible.)

=== Chronology ===
The systematic application by historians of the term "baroque" to music of this period is a relatively recent development. In 1919, Curt Sachs became the first to apply the five characteristics of Heinrich Wölfflin's theory of the Baroque, describing the visual arts, systematically to music. Critics were quick to question the attempt to transpose Wölfflin's categories to music, however. Whereas art historians consider the start of the Baroque period to be the middle or beginning of the 16th century, Robert Haas argued that in music it could not begin earlier than 1594, the year that Palestrina and Lassus died.

In the 1940s independent attempts were made by Manfred Bukofzer and Suzanne Clercx-Lejeune to use autonomous, technical analysis rather than comparative abstractions, in order to avoid the adaptation of theories based on the plastic arts and literature to music. All of these efforts resulted in appreciable disagreement about time boundaries of the period, and challenges regarding the practice of grouping together works and composers in a broad era when stylistic developments occurred in different places at different times.

The term gradually gained acceptance to describe a period between Renaissance music and the Classical period. It is often split into three approximate phases, in the same manner that Wölfflin described the visual arts. According to Bukofzer these were "early Baroque" (1580–1630), "middle Baroque" (1630–1680), and "late Baroque" (1680–1730). Clercx instead separated them into "primitive Baroque" (mid-late 16th century), "full Baroque" (17th century), and "tardy Baroque (1700–1740 or 1765).

=== Characteristics ===
A definitive set of characteristics which differentiate Baroque music from preceding or succeeding movements is difficult to enumerate. Many have been suggested, including "dynamism, open form, degree of ornamentation, sharp contrast, co-existence of diverse styles, individualism, affective representation and numerous others", but as the musicologist Claude V. Palisca points out, there is too much diversity within the repertoire of the time to make sweeping generalisations: "Although the style of Gesualdo is dynamic and open-formed, that of Alessandro Scarlatti is not. While Caccini's music is ornamented, Corelli's fundamentally is not (although it sometimes invited ornamentation); besides, the style of the 1740s or 1770s was also ornamented. The sharp contrasts observed in the late sacred concertos of Gabrieli are less striking or at least appear normal in an opera of Cesti. Diverse styles have co-existed in many periods, if perhaps less in the Renaissance."

It is possible to characterise Baroque music by its development as a means of affective expression. Prompted by a rediscovery of classical rhetoric and Aristotle's Poetics, which highlight the importance of stirring an audience's emotions, as well as the spread of Humanism and the classically inspired poetry of Petrarch, this focus on expression of subjective experience is what precipitated the pejorative connotations of the term "baroque" in its early usage, as its apparent extravagance or strangeness were caused by a new impetus to express emotion or states of mind.

Composers also looked to the ancient world for tonal inspiration, drawing on Ptolemy and Aristoxenus to develop chromaticism beyond the modes of the Renaissance period. A more scientific understanding of sound and pitch led to innovations such as equal temperament and modulation. The rise of the middle class in centres of trade led to a demand for subscription-based opera houses, and an increased preference for more realistic or historical operas over mythological subjects.

== History ==
Throughout the Baroque era, new developments in music originated in Italy, after which it took up to 20 years before they were broadly adopted in rest of the Western classical music practice. For instance, Italian composers switched to the galant style around 1730, while German composers such as Johann Sebastian Bach largely continued to write in the baroque style up to 1750.

Phases of Baroque music
Subperiod	Time	In Italy	Elsewhere
Early baroque	1580–1650	Gabrieli; Peri; Monteverdi; Frescobaldi	M. Praetorius; Sweelinck; O. Gibbons; Schütz
Middle baroque	1630–1700	Cavalli; Carissimi; Cesti; Legrenzi; Stradella	Lully; Biber; Buxtehude; Purcell; Pachelbel
Late baroque	1680–1750	Corelli; Torelli; Vivaldi; Pergolesi	Telemann; Rameau; Handel; J. S. Bach

=== Early baroque music (1580–1650) ===
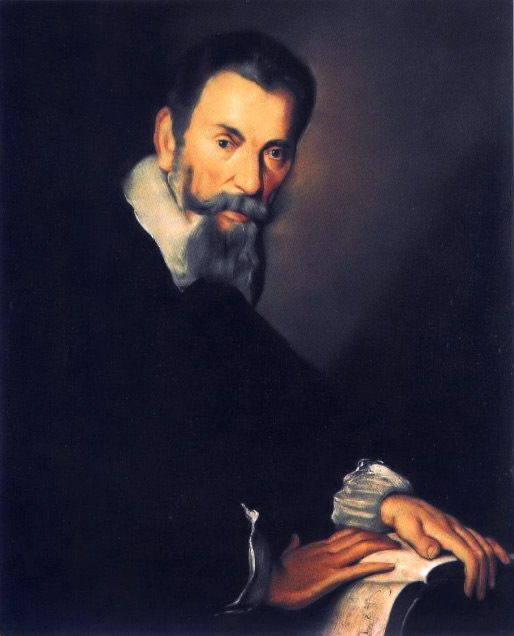
Claudio Monteverdi in 1640

The Florentine Camerata was a group of humanists, musicians, poets and intellectuals in late Renaissance Florence who gathered under the patronage of Count Giovanni de' Bardi to discuss and guide trends in the arts, especially music and drama. In reference to music, they based their ideals on a perception of Classical (especially ancient Greek) musical drama that valued discourse and oration. Accordingly, they rejected their contemporaries' use of polyphony (multiple, independent melodic lines) and instrumental music, and discussed such ancient Greek music devices as monody, which consisted of a solo singing accompanied by a kithara (an ancient strummed string instrument). The early realizations of these ideas, including Jacopo Peri's Dafne and L'Euridice, marked the beginning of opera, which was a catalyst for Baroque music.

Concerning music theory, the more widespread use of figured bass (also known as thorough bass) represents the developing importance of harmony as the linear underpinnings of polyphony. Harmony is the result of counterpoint, and figured bass is a visual representation of those harmonies commonly employed in musical performance. With figured bass, numbers, accidentals or symbols were placed above the bassline that was read by keyboard instrument players such as harpsichord players or pipe organists (or lutenists). The numbers, accidentals or symbols indicated to the keyboard player what intervals are to be played above each bass note. The keyboard player would improvise a chord voicing for each bass note. Composers began concerning themselves with harmonic progressions, and also employed the tritone, perceived as an unstable interval, to create dissonance (it was used in the dominant seventh chord and the diminished chord). An interest in harmony had also existed among certain composers in the Renaissance, notably Carlo Gesualdo; However, the use of harmony directed towards tonality (a focus on a musical key that becomes the "home note" of a piece), rather than modality, marks the shift from the Renaissance into the Baroque period. This led to the idea that certain sequences of chords, rather than just notes, could provide a sense of closure at the end of a piece—one of the fundamental ideas that became known as tonality.

By incorporating these new aspects of composition, Claudio Monteverdi furthered the transition from the Renaissance style of music to that of the Baroque period. He developed two individual styles of composition—the heritage of Renaissance polyphony (prima pratica) and the new basso continuo technique of the Baroque (seconda pratica). With basso continuo, a small group of musicians would play the bassline and the chords which formed the accompaniment for a melody. The basso continuo group would typically use one or more keyboard players and a lute player who would play the bassline and improvise the chords and several bass instruments (e.g., viol, cello, double bass) which would play the bassline. With the writing of the operas L'Orfeo and L'incoronazione di Poppea among others, Monteverdi brought considerable attention to this new genre. This Venetian style was taken handily to Germany by Heinrich Schütz, whose diverse style also evolved into the subsequent period.

Idiomatic instrumental textures became increasingly prominent. In particular, the style luthé—the irregular and unpredictable breaking up of chordal progressions, in contrast to the regular patterning of broken chords—referred to since the early 20th century as style brisé, was established as a consistent texture in French music by Robert Ballard, in his lute books of 1611 and 1614, and by Ennemond Gaultier. This idiomatic lute figuration was later transferred to the harpsichord, for example in the keyboard music of Louis Couperin and Jean-Henri D'Anglebert, and continued to be an important influence on keyboard music throughout the 18th and early 19th centuries (in, for example, the music of Johann Sebastian Bach and Frédéric Chopin).

=== Middle baroque music (1630–1700) ===
The rise of the centralized court is one of the economic and political features of what is often labelled the Age of Absolutism, personified by Louis XIV of France. The style of palace, and the court system of manners and arts he fostered became the model for the rest of Europe. The realities of rising church and state patronage created the demand for organized public music, as the increasing availability of instruments created the demand for chamber music, which is music for a small ensemble of instrumentalists.

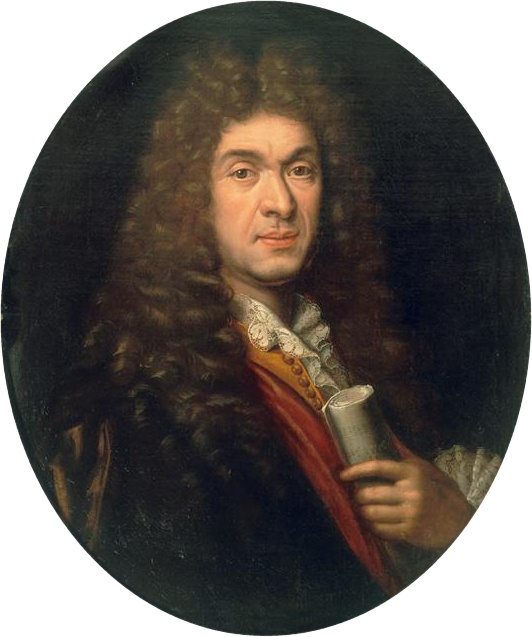
Jean-Baptiste Lully by Paul Mignard

One pre-eminent example of a court style composer is Jean-Baptiste Lully. He purchased patents from the monarchy to be the sole composer of operas for the French king and to prevent others from having operas staged. He completed 15 lyric tragedies and left unfinished Achille et Polyxène. Lully was an early example of a conductor; he would beat the time with a large staff to keep his ensembles together.

Musically, he did not establish the string-dominated norm for orchestras, which was inherited from the Italian opera, and the characteristically French five-part disposition (violins, violas—in hautes-contre, tailles and quintes sizes—and bass violins) had been used in the ballet from the time of Louis XIII. He did, however, introduce this ensemble to the lyric theatre, with the upper parts often doubled by recorders, flutes, and oboes, and the bass by bassoons. Trumpets and kettledrums were frequently added for heroic scenes.

The middle Baroque period in Italy is defined by the emergence of the vocal styles of cantata, oratorio, and opera during the 1630s, and a new concept of melody and harmony that elevated the status of the music to one of equality with the words, which formerly had been regarded as pre-eminent. The florid, coloratura monody of the early Baroque gave way to a simpler, more polished melodic style. These melodies were built from short, cadentially delimited ideas often based on stylized dance patterns drawn from the sarabande or the courante. The harmonies, too, might be simpler than in the early Baroque monody, to show expression in a lighter manner on the string and crescendos and diminuendos on longer notes. The accompanying bass lines were more integrated with the melody, producing a contrapuntal equivalence of the parts that later led to the device of an initial bass anticipation of the aria melody. This harmonic simplification also led to a new formal device of the differentiation of recitative (a more spoken part of opera) and aria (a part of opera that used sung melodies). The most important innovators of this style were the Romans Luigi Rossi and Giacomo Carissimi, who were primarily composers of cantatas and oratorios, respectively, and the Venetian Francesco Cavalli, who was principally an opera composer. Later important practitioners of this style include Antonio Cesti, Giovanni Legrenzi, and Alessandro Stradella, who additionally originated the concerto grosso style in his Sonate di viole.

Arcangelo Corelli is remembered as influential for his achievements on the other side of musical technique—as a violinist who organized violin technique and pedagogy—and in purely instrumental music, particularly his advocacy and development of the concerto grosso. Whereas Lully was ensconced at court, Corelli was one of the first composers to publish widely and have his music performed all over Europe. As with Lully's stylization and organization of the opera, the concerto grosso is built on strong contrasts—sections alternate between those played by the full orchestra, and those played by a smaller group. Fast sections and slow sections were juxtaposed against each other. Numbered among his students is Antonio Vivaldi, who later composed hundreds of works based on the principles in Corelli's trio sonatas and concerti.

In contrast to these composers, Dieterich Buxtehude was not a creature of court but instead was a church musician, holding the posts of organist and Werkmeister at the Marienkirche at Lübeck. His duties as Werkmeister involved acting as the secretary, treasurer, and business manager of the church, while his position as organist included playing for all the main services, sometimes in collaboration with other instrumentalists or vocalists, who were also paid by the church. Entirely outside of his official church duties, he organised and directed a concert series known as the Abendmusiken, which included performances of sacred dramatic works regarded by his contemporaries as the equivalent of operas.

=== Late baroque music (1680–1750) ===
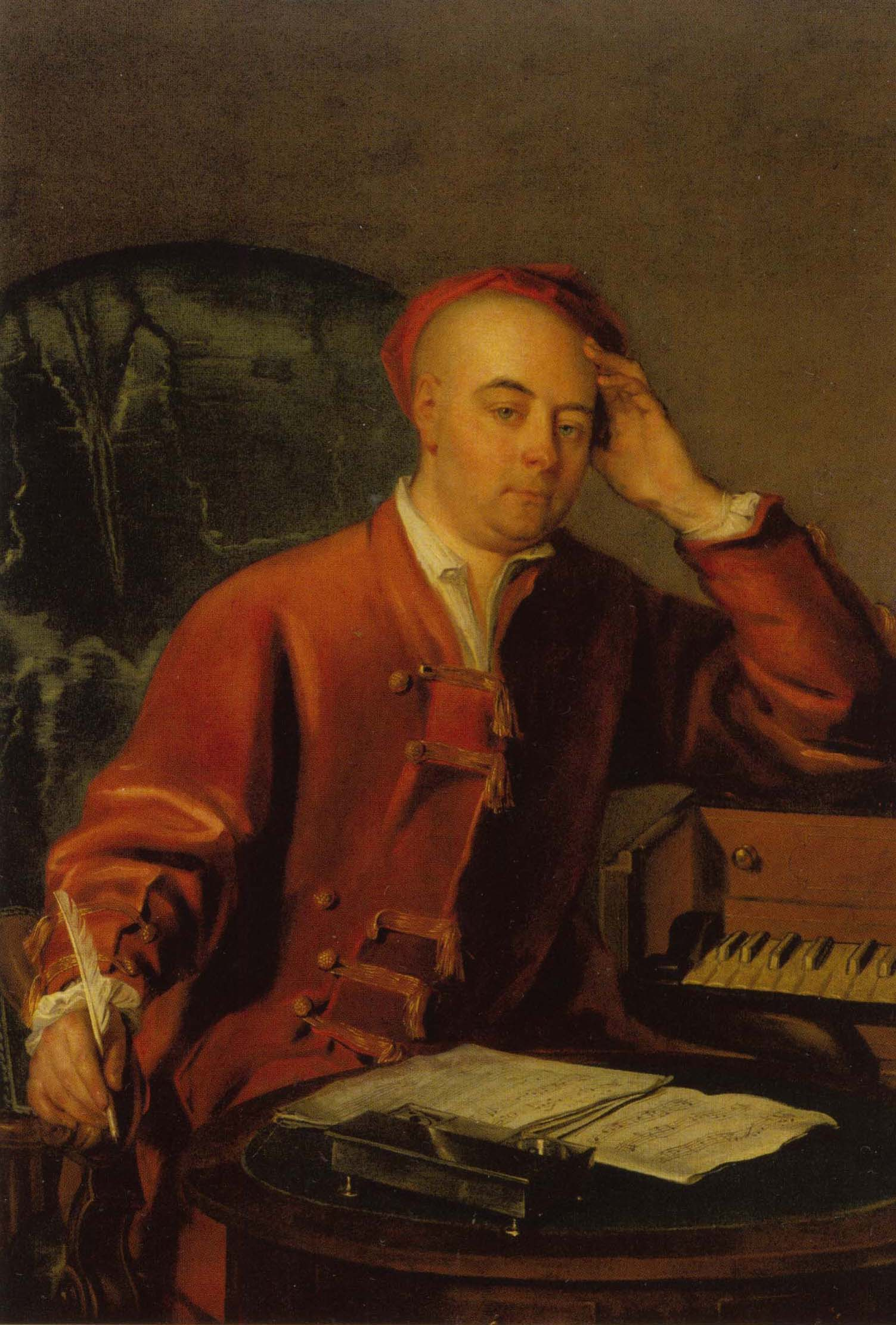
George Frideric Handel

The Late Baroque period saw a continuation of the distinct French and Italian styles, especially in opera. In Italy, the form of opera seria developed, and became the dominant type of opera for most of the 18th century. The da capo aria became a widely used form; instrumental and dance numbers became rarer; and improvisational embellishment was standard. In French opera, by contrast, the aria was not as widely used; operas continued to include divertissements (instrumental dance numbers); and ornamentation was notated rather than left to the performer.

Opera seria called for larger orchestral forces – especially in the string section, which often required two dozen or more performers – catalysing the creation of the modern orchestra. It became common for arias to be scored for a full orchestra, instead of simply a continuo, and they began to feature word painting, such as in the use of horns or trumpets for hunting scenes.

Over the course of the 17th century, composers began to specify individual instruments in their scores and write idiomatically for them as instrument-building technology developed, often dictating articulation and ornaments. Both the recorder and the transverse flute date to the early Renaissance; each could only be played easily in a limited number of keys, with the recorder more suited to "flat" keys while the flute was better in "sharp" keys, a fact used by late Baroque composers when scoring the instruments. By 1700 the oboe had replaced the shawm as the main woodwind instrument in an ensemble, due to composers' need for a more elegant sound in opera and ballet. The natural horn became common in orchestras around this time, and developments in playing technique allowed for playing of most of the chromatic scale, leading to its standard specification as an accompaniment to the Italian string orchestra by 1750.

The harpsichord had become the pre-eminent keyboard instrument for domestic music-making by the late Baroque. The changes in musical style in the mid-18th century, including a need for control over dynamics, led to its gradual obsolescence. The harpsichord was replaced by the fortepiano, which was perfected by Bartolomeo Cristofori around 1700 and widely used after 1750. However, Classical composers still frequently used the harpsichord in concert due to limitations in its potential maximum volume. In churches, organs had grown in complexity and size, especially in France, Spain and northern Germany, expanding the available range of pitches and timbres.

Musical forms became regularised in the late Baroque, both within movements and on a larger scale for pieces with multiple movements. The concurrent move away from modality and towards diatonic tonality led to the concept of modulation as a fundamental part of a piece's structure. From the late 17th century, the key was often included in an instrumental piece's title, highlighting its importance to composers of the period. A "gradual simplifaction of harmony and musical texture", with a stronger emphasis on melody and a reduction in counterpoint, began to take place in the early-to-mid 18th century, eventually leading to the Galant style, popular in the middle decades of the century. For example, the composer Domenico Scarlatti, famous for his 555 sonatas, had the tendency to follow this style and his music greatly influenced later Classical pieces. Another example is the virtuoso Carlos Seixas, the most pre-eminent musician of his generation in Portugal, who stands in the odd position of transitioning between late baroque and the Galant style culminating in his Harpsichord Concerto in A Major. The distinction between French and Italian music became much weaker, and while stile antico persisted for a time in Italian and Austrian sacred music, composers found value in a simpler texture and harmony in order to support expressive melodies, as opposed to the perceived overwrought nature of counterpoint of the late Baroque.

== Styles and forms ==
=== Dance suite ===
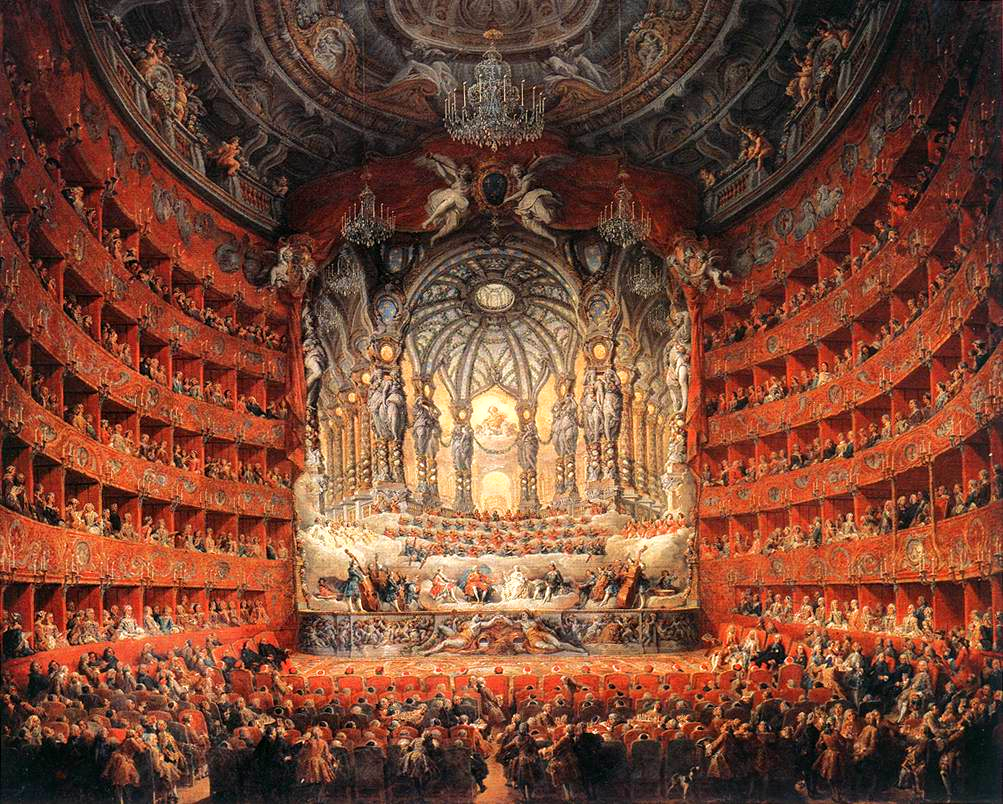
A large instrumental ensemble's performance in the lavish Teatro Argentina, as depicted by Panini (1747)

A characteristic of the Baroque form was the dance suite. Some dance suites by Bach are called partitas, although this term is also used for other collections of pieces. While the pieces in a dance suite were inspired by actual dance music, dance suites were intended for listening, not for accompanying dancers. Composers used a variety of different movements in their dance suites. A dance suite commonly has these movements:

- Overture – The Baroque suite often began with a French overture ("Ouverture" in French), a slow movement followed by a succession of principally four different types of dances:
- Allemande – Often the first dance of an instrumental suite, the allemande was a very popular dance that had its origins in the German Renaissance era. The allemande was played at a moderate tempo and could start on any beat of the bar.
- Courante – The second dance is the courante, in triple meter. It can be either fast and lively or slow and stately. The Italian version is called the corrente.
- Sarabande – The sarabande, a Spanish dance, is the third of the four basic dances, and is one of the slowest of the baroque dances. It is also in triple meter and can start on any beat of the bar, although there is an emphasis on the second beat, creating the characteristic 'halting', or iambic rhythm of the sarabande.
- Gigue – The gigue is an upbeat and lively baroque dance in compound meter, typically the concluding movement of an instrumental suite, and the fourth of its basic dance types. The gigue can start on any beat of the bar and is easily recognized by its rhythmic feel. The gigue originated in the British Isles. Its counterpart in folk music is the jig.

The four dance types (allemande, courante, sarabande, and gigue) make up the majority of 17th-century suites. Later suites interpolate one or more additional dances between the sarabande and gigue:

- Gavotte – The gavotte is in duple metre, with phrases which start on an offbeat. The gavotte is played at a moderate tempo, although those in an Italian style may be faster.
- Bourrée – The bourrée is similar to the gavotte as it is in 2/2 time, although it starts on the second half of the last beat of the bar, creating a different feel to the dance. The bourrée is commonly played at a moderate tempo, although for some composers, such as Handel, it can be taken at a much faster tempo.
- Minuet – in triple meter at moderate tempo. It does not have an anacrusis. The Italian minuet was typically faster, with longer phrases.
- Passepied – The passepied is a fast dance in binary form and triple meter that originated as a court dance in Brittany.
- Rigaudon – The rigaudon is a lively French dance in duple meter, similar to the bourrée, but rhythmically simpler. It originated as a family of closely related southern-French folk dances, traditionally associated with the provinces of Vavarais, Languedoc, Dauphiné, and Provence.

There are many other dance forms as well as other pieces that could be included in a suite, such as Polonaise, Loure, Scherzo, Air, etc.

=== Other features ===
- Prelude – a suite might be started by a prelude, a slow piece written in an improvisatory style. Some Baroque preludes were not fully written out; instead, a sequence of chords were indicated, with the expectation that the instrumentalist would be able to improvise a melodic part using the indicated harmonic framework. The prelude was not based on a type of dance.
- Entrée – Sometimes an entrée is composed as part of a suite; but there it is purely instrumental music and no dance is performed. It is an introduction, a march-like piece played during the entrance of a dancing group, or played before a ballet. Usually in 4/4 time. It is related to the Italian 'intrada'.
- Basso continuo – a kind of continuous accompaniment notated with a new music notation system, figured bass, usually for one or more sustaining bass instruments (e.g., cello) and one or more chord-playing instruments (e.g., keyboard instruments such as harpsichord, pipe organ or lute)
- The concerto (a solo piece with orchestral accompaniment) and concerto grosso
- Monody – an accompanied Italian solo song, an outgrowth of arrangements of ensemble music for solo instruments in the late 16th century
- Homophony – music with one melodic voice and rhythmically similar (and subordinate) chordal accompaniment (this and monody are contrasted with the typical Renaissance texture, polyphony)
- Dramatic musical forms like opera, dramma per musica
- Combined instrumental-vocal forms, such as the oratorio and cantata, both of which used singers and orchestra
- New instrumental techniques, like tremolo and pizzicato
- The da capo aria had become the dominant form of aria by 1680
- The ritornello aria – repeated short instrumental interruptions of vocal passages.
- The stile concertato – contrast in sound between groups of instruments.
- Extensive ornamentation, which was typically improvised by singers and instrumentalists (e.g., trills, mordents, etc.)

== Genres ==
=== Vocal ===
- Opera
  - Singspiel
  - Ballad opera
  - Semi-opera
  - Zarzuela
  - Intermezzo
  - Opera buffa
  - Opera seria
  - Opéra comique
  - Opera-ballet
  - Tragédie en musique
- Ballet de cour
- Masque
- Oratorio
- Passion (music)
- Cantata
- Mass (music)
- Anthem
- Monody
- Chorale

=== Instrumental ===
- Chorale composition
- Concerto
  - Concerto grosso
- Fugue
- Suite
  - Allemande
  - Courante
  - Sarabande
  - Gigue
  - Gavotte
  - Minuet
- Sonata
  - Sonata da camera
  - Sonata da chiesa
  - Trio sonata
- Partita
- Canzona
- Sinfonia
- Fantasia
- Ricercar
- Toccata
- Prelude
- Chaconne
- Passacaglia
- Chorale prelude
- Stylus fantasticus
