= Partita for Violin No. 2 (Bach) =

Composition for violin by Johan Sebastian Bach

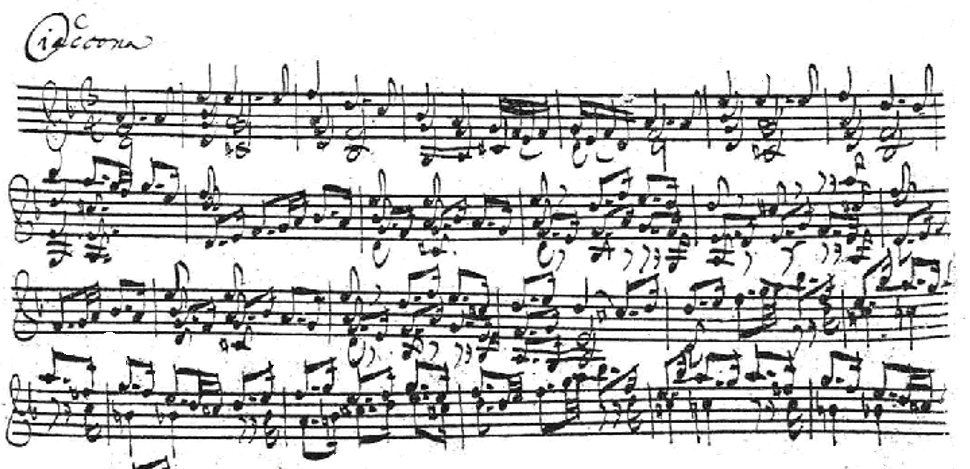
Chaconne (beginning), Bach's manuscript

The Partita in D minor for solo violin, BWV 1004, by Johann Sebastian Bach, was written between 1717 and 1720. It is a part of his compositional cycle called Sonatas and Partitas for Solo Violin.

The most famous part of the work is the Chaconne (or Ciaccona).

== Structure ==
I. Allemanda

V. Ciaccona

1. Allemande
2. Corrente
3. Sarabanda
4. Giga
5. Ciaccona

Except for the ciaccona, (Note: While the origin and early usage of the chaconne is a dance, its "busy passage-work and contrapuntal density largely obliterated any dance feeling" by Bach's time in Germany.) the movements are dance types of the time, and they are frequently listed by their French names: Allemande, Courante, Sarabande, Gigue, and Chaconne. The final movement is written in the form of variations, and lasts approximately as long as the first four movements combined.

The performance time of the whole partita varies between 26 and 32 minutes, depending on the approach and style of the performer.

== Reception ==
Professor Helga Thoene suggests that this partita, and especially its last movement, was a tombeau written in memory of Bach's first wife, Maria Barbara Bach (who died in 1720), though this theory is controversial.

Yehudi Menuhin called the Chaconne "the greatest structure for solo violin that exists".

Violinist Joshua Bell has said the Chaconne is "not just one of the greatest pieces of music ever written, but one of the greatest achievements of any man in history. It's a spiritually powerful piece, emotionally powerful, structurally perfect." He played the piece busking in L'Enfant Plaza for The Washington Post.

Johannes Brahms described the piece in a letter to Clara Schumann: "On one stave, for a small instrument, the man [Bach] writes a whole world of the deepest thoughts and most powerful feelings. If I imagined that I could have created, even conceived the piece, I am quite certain that the excess of excitement and earth-shattering experience would have driven me out of my mind."

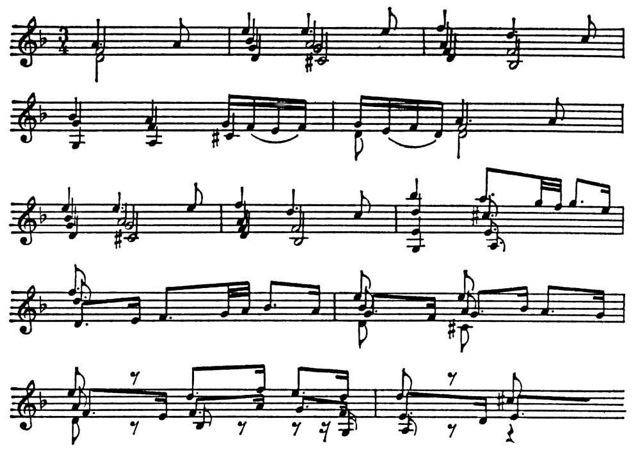
Ciaccona

== Transcriptions of the Ciaccona ==
Raymond Erickson has identified approximately two hundred transcriptions and arrangements of Bach's Ciaccona.

Chaconne for piano with left hand only
Transcription of the Chaconne by Brahms for piano with left hand only, performed by Martha Goldstein

=== Keyboard transcriptions ===
==== Organ transcriptions ====
The earliest version for organ is by William Thomas Best. Further transcriptions are by John Cook, Wilhelm Middelschulte, Walter Henry Goss-Custard (1915–55), and Henri Messerer (1838–1923).

In the preface to his 1955 transcription, John Cook writes: "The Chaconne is sublimely satisfying in its original form, yet many will agree that a single violin is only able to hint at the vast implications of much of this music … It is perhaps not unreasonable to suppose that Bach would have chosen the organ, had he transcribed the Chaconne himself, as the instrument best suited to the scale of his ideas … A good performance on the violin may be taken as the best guide to interpretation on the organ – the two instruments are not without their points in common, and both were beloved of Bach."

==== Harpsichord transcription ====
Gustav Leonhardt arranged the Partita for harpsichord solo. The Chaconne has also been arranged for harpsichord by Pieter-Jan Belder.

==== Piano transcriptions ====
Transcriptions for piano include those by Ferruccio Busoni, Alexander Siloti, Joachim Raff, and Rudolf Lutz, and for the piano left-hand by Johannes Brahms, Paul Wittgenstein, and Géza Zichy.

Felix Mendelssohn and Robert Schumann each wrote piano accompaniments for the work.

Carl Reinecke transcribed the piece for piano duet.

=== Cello transcriptions ===
There is a transcription of the Chaconne for solo cello made by cellist Johann Sebastian Paetsch in 2015. This has been published by the Hofmeister Musikverlag in Leipzig.

=== Guitar transcriptions ===
The Chaconne is often performed on guitar. Marc Pincherle, Secretary of the French Society of Musicology in Paris, wrote in 1930: "If, insofar as certain rapid monodic passages are concerned, opinion is divided between the violin and the guitar as the better medium, the guitar always triumphs in polyphonic passages; that is to say almost throughout the entire work. The timbre of the guitar creates new and emotional resonance and unsuspected dynamic gradations in those passages which might have been created purely for the violin; as for instance the variations in arpeggi."

The most well-known transcription for guitar is the Segovia transcription. Many guitarists today prefer to play the Chaconne directly from the violin score.

=== Orchestral transcriptions ===
There are a number of transcriptions of the Chaconne for orchestras of different sizes, including Leopold Stokowski's transcription for a full symphony orchestra.

A.M. Herz's transcription for string quartet can be scaled up for performance by chamber orchestra. It was published in 1927 (under the name Albert Maria Herz). The work was recorded by the Asasello Quartet in 2023.

=== Other transcriptions ===
Anne Dudley arranged Bach's Chaconne for piano trio, and a recording by the Eroica Trio appears on their Baroque album. The Chaconne has been arranged for violin plus four voices by Christoph Poppen and the Hilliard Ensemble. The Chaconne was transcribed for pedal harp by Dewey Owens, published by Lyra, and also by Skaila Kanga. The Chaconne was also transcribed by José Miguel Moreno for baroque lute, performed solo and also accompanied by a soprano and a countertenor.

== Dance ==
Bach's violin Ciaccona has been choreographed almost fifty times.

== Literature ==
In 2005 Joseph C. Mastroianni published Chaconne The Novel. Milo, abandoned by the father who introduced him to the Chaconne, studied in Spain for four years to master the piece.

In 2008 Arnold Steinhardt, the violin soloist and first violinist of the Guarneri String Quartet, published Violin Dreams, a memoir about his life as a violinist and about his ultimate challenge: playing Bach's Chaconne.

In 2017 Márta Ábrahám and Barnabás Dukay published a book about the Chaconne: Excerpts from Eternity – The Purification of Time and Character, the Fulfilment of Love and Cooperation with the Celestial Will in Johann Sebastian Bach's Ciaccona for Violin.

== Notes and references ==
Notes

Sources

- Altschuler, Eric Lewin. 2005. "Were Bach's Toccata and Fugue BWV565 and the Ciacconia from BWV1004 Lute Pieces?" The Musical Times 146, no. 1893 (Winter): 77–86.
- Anderson, Rick. 2002. "Johann Sebastian Bach: Morimur. Hilliard Ensemble; Christoph Poppen. ECM 289 461 895-2, 2001." Notes, second series, 59, No. 1 (September): 145.
- Bach: Suites, Partitas, Sonatas, Bärenreiter BA 11820, ISMN 9790006562602.
- Berg, Christopher. 2009. "Bach, Busoni, Segovia, and the Chaconne". Pristine Madness [Christopher Berg blog] (10 August) (accessed 20 June 2016)
- Block, Melissa. 2007. "Violin Dreams': Chasing Bach's Elusive Chaconne". NPR Music (18 January) (accessed 20 June 2016).
- Erickson, Raymond. 2002. "Secret Codes, Dance and Bach's Great 'Ciaccona'". Early Music America 8, no. 2:34–43.
- 3 Pieces from BWV 565, 903, 1004, Leipzig: Friedrich Hofmeister Musikverlag, FH 3021, 2015, (Editor/Arranger: Johann Sebastian Paetsch), ISMN 9790203430216.
- Humphreys, David. 2002. "Esoteric Bach". Early Music 30, no. 2 (May): 307.
- Mastroianni, Joseph C. n.d. Chaconne: The Novel. The Devil's Advocate (accessed 26 October 2014).
- Kanga, Skaila (n.d.). "Chaconne from Partita No. 2". Harp Column Music. Maruka Music.
- Menuhin, Yehudi. 2001. Unfinished Journey, new edition. London: Pimlico. ISBN 978-0-7126-6809-5.
- Pincherle, Marc. 1930. "Bach and the Guitar". (accessed 20 June 2016).
- Rich, Alan. 2006. "Morimur: Is There Sex after Bach?" In his So I've Heard: Notes of a Migratory Music Critic, 66–67. Milwaukee: Amadeus. ISBN 1-57467-133-2.
- Schumann, Clara, and Johannes Brahms. 1927. Letters of Clara Schumann and Johannes Brahms, 1853–1896, 2 vols., edited by Berthold Litzmann. Encore Music Editions. London: E. Arnold; New York: Longmans, Green and Co. Reprinted, Westport, Connecticut: Hyperion Press, 1979. ISBN 0883557614.
- Silbiger, Alexander. 1999. "Bach and the Chaconne". The Journal of Musicology 17, no. 3 (Summer): 358–385.
- Silbiger, Alexander (2001). "Chaconne (Fr., also chacony; It. ciaccona, ciacona; Sp. chacona)". Grove Music Online (8th ed.). Oxford University Press. doi:10.1093/gmo/9781561592630.article.05354. ISBN 978-1-56159-263-0. (subscription, Wikilibrary access, or UK public library membership required) (subscription required)
- Smith, William Ander. 1990. The Mystery of Leopold Stokowski. Rutherford, Madison, and Teaneck: Fairleigh Dickinson University Press; London and Toronto: Associated University Presses.
- Thoene, Helga. 1994. "Johann Sebastian Bach. Ciaconna—Tanz oder Tombeau. Verborgene Sprache eines berühmten Werkes". In Festschrift zum Leopoldfest [15. Köthener Bachfesttage] , 14–81. Cöthener Bach-Hefte 6, Veröffentlichungen des Historischen Museums Köthen/Anhalt XIX. Köthen.
- Thoene, Helga. 2001. Johann Sebastian Bach, Ciaccona: Tanz oder Tombeau?—Eine analytische Studie. Oschersleben: Ziethen. ISBN 3-935358-60-1.
- Thoene, Helga. 2003. "Verborgener Klang und verschlüsselte Sprache in den Werken für Violine solo von Johann Sebastian Bach". In AnsBACHwoche, Almanach: 25 Juli bis 3. August 2003, 22–35. Ansbach: Bachwoche Ansbach.
- Weingarten, Gene. 2007. "Pearls Before Breakfast" (article text only); includes video. Washington Post Magazine (April 8; accessed September 18, 2011).
- Woodring Goertzen, Valerie, ed. (n.d.). "Bach/Brahms: Chaconne from Partita no. 2 d Minor, arrangement for piano, left hand" (Urtext). G. Henle Verlag. Archived from the original on 2022-08-13.
