= Émile Maupas =

French biologist and librarian (1842–1916)

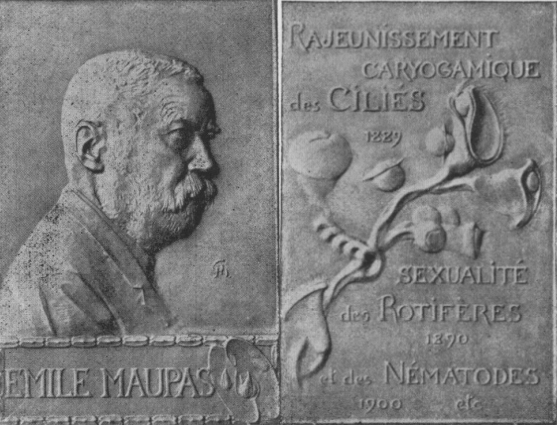
A commemorative medallion made in 1913

François Émile Maupas (2 July 1842 in Vaudry – 18 October 1916 in Algiers) was a French librarian, protozoologist, cytologist, and botanist. Maupas contributed to ideas on the life cycle and reproduction of the ciliates. He founded the idea, known as the Maupasian life cycle, that some protists had a definite death following sexual reproduction, contrary to contemporary ideas on protists being immortal. He also identified the existence of mating types in ciliates. He developed culture techniques for a number of organisms and described the nematode Caenorhabditis elegans, which has since become a widely used model organism in biological studies.

== Life and work ==
Maupas was born in Vaudry, to deputy mayor Pierre Augustin and Marie Adèle Geffroy. After studies at the local schools he joined the École des chartes, and from 1867 he worked as an archivist in Cantal. It was here that he developed an interest in natural history and began to study protozoa working in summer at laboratories in Paris. In 1890 he was named as an administrator-curator at the Bibliothèque nationale d'Alger and continued his research in his spare time. He was a correspondent member of the Académie des Sciences.

Maupas studied the life-history and reproduction of many species using innovative culture techniques. He examined conjugation in ciliates and established that senescence and death occurred in ciliates, contrary to the view of August Weismann and others that they were immortal, following sexual reproduction. Maupas did not agree that the main value of sexual reproduction was in the maintenance of variability. He argued that it helped in rejuvenating the nucleus of one of the two conjugants. He also suggested that there were sexes or mating types in rotifers, including parthenogenetic females. Maupas also studied nematodes and first described Rhabditis elegans (now Caenorhabditis elegans) in 1900 and isolated it from soil in Algeria. His culture techniques enabled the species to become one of the most widely studied model organisms. He noted that nematodes had a five-stage development with the fifth being the adult stage. The annelid genus Maupasia is named after him, as is the ascarid genus Maupasiella (synonym Maupasina Seurat, 1913).

Maupas had no formal training in science and worked almost completely in isolation but published in journals. He received an honorary doctorate in 1903 from the University of Heidelberg and was decorated knight of the Legion of Honour in 1909.

== Associated published works ==
He was the author of "Description physique de la République Argentine : d'après des observations personnelles et étrangères", a French translation of Hermann Burmeister's book on the Argentine Republic. Other written efforts by Maupas include:

- Essai sur la législation des guerres féodales, thèse École des Chartes, 1867.
- Un nouveau Rhabditis; Sur un champignon parasite des Rhabditis (A new Rhabditis; about a fungus parasite of Rhabditis) with René Maire, 1915.
  - Works about Émile Maupas:
- Inauguration de la plaque commémorative apposée sur la maison habitée par Emile Maupas à Alger, le mercredi 6 avril 1932, by Maurice Caullery; Académie des sciences (France). Paris : Gauthier-Villars, 1937.
- Emile Maupas : prince des protozologistes, by Edmond Sergent, Alger : Institut Pasteur d'Alger, 1955.
- Emile MAUPAS 1842-1916: Le savant de la Casbah d'Alger, by Gérard-Luc Neouze, Neuilly-sur-Seine: Les Éditions de l'Officine, 2024, ISBN 978-2355513893.

== See also ==
- History of research on Caenorhabditis elegans
