= Françoise Lengellé =

French harpsichordist and music professor (1944–2025)

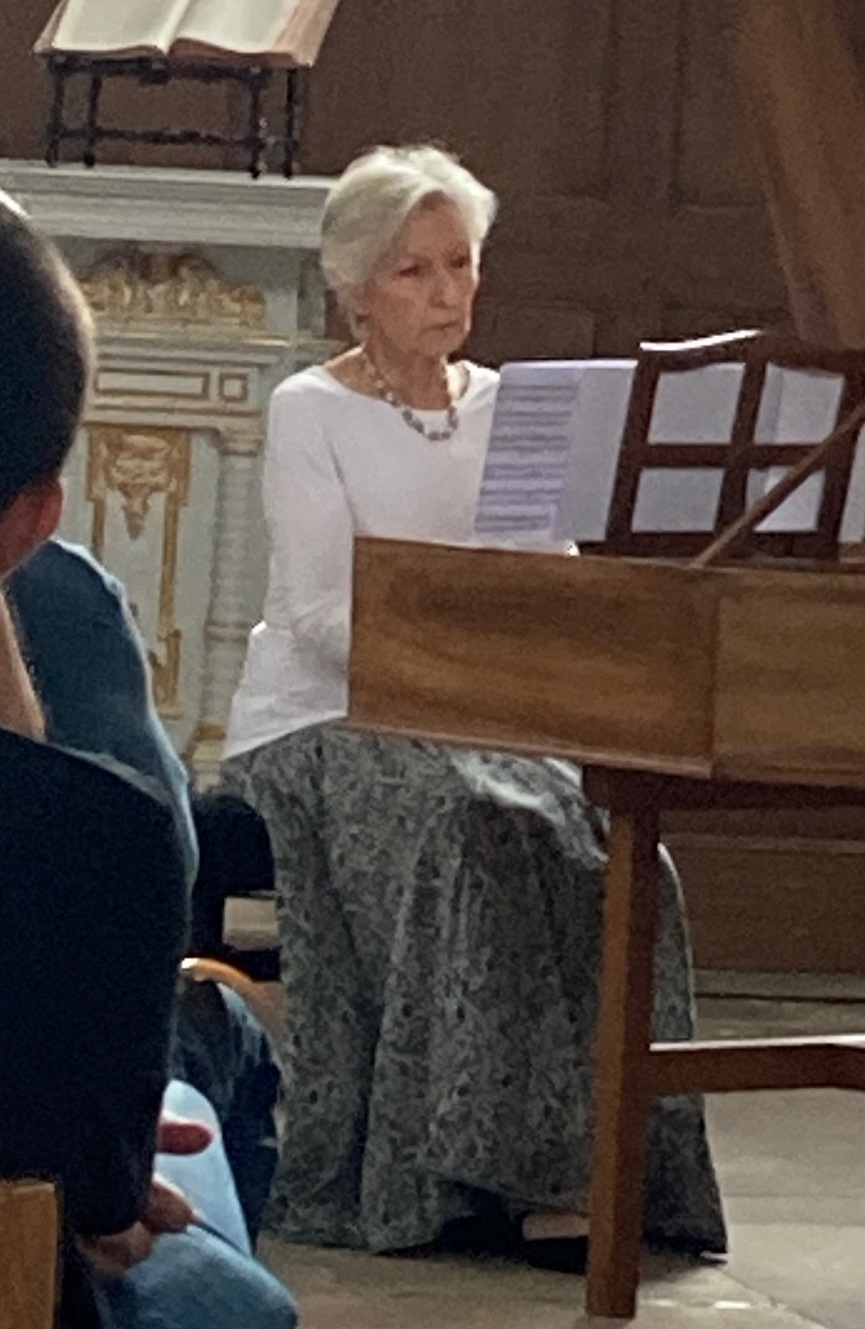
- Lengellé in 2022
- Born: 1944
- Died: 2 November 2025 (aged 80–81)
- Education: Conservatoire de Paris
- Occupations: Harpsichordist; professor

Françoise Lengellé (French: [fʁɑ̃swaz lɑ̃ʒɛle]; 1944 – 2 November 2025) was a French harpsichordist and music professor.

== Life and career ==
Born in 1944, Lengellé attended the Conservatoire de Paris under the tutelage of Kenneth Gilbert, Ton Koopman, and Gustav Leonhardt. Impassioned with harpsichord and music from the 16th and 17th centuries, she headed the harpsichord department at the Conservatoire national supérieur de musique et de danse de Lyon until 2010 and was a frequent guest professor at the University of California, Santa Barbara. In 1977, she won second prize at the MAfestival Brugge for harpsichord and later served as a member of the jury for the award. In 2008, she was named a knight of the Ordre des Arts et des Lettres. She primarily played the works of François Couperin, Jean-Philippe Rameau, Jacques Champion de Chambonnières, and Johann Sebastian Bach.

Lengellé died on 2 November 2025.
