= Parville manuscript =

The Parville manuscript is a manuscript compiled of French harpsichord compositions from the 17th-century and is one of the most comprehensive sources of French harpsichord music of this era. Along with the Bauyn manuscript, it is one of the most important sources for French harpsichord music of the 17th century.

The manuscript was created at around 1670 and discovered in Italy in 1968. The front cover is inscribed "M. de Parville", hence the name. It contains around 150 pieces by French composers of the era, including Jean-Henri d'Anglebert, Jacques Champion de Chambonnières and Louis Couperin, and several anonymous works.

A copy is available in the collection of the Jean Gray Hargrove Music Library at the UC Berkeley(catalogue number MS-778; full number US-BEM 778). US-BEm is the Manuscript library sigla for Jean Hargrove Music Library, University of California, Berkeley, CA.

== See also ==
- French baroque harpsichordists
