= Bauyn manuscript =

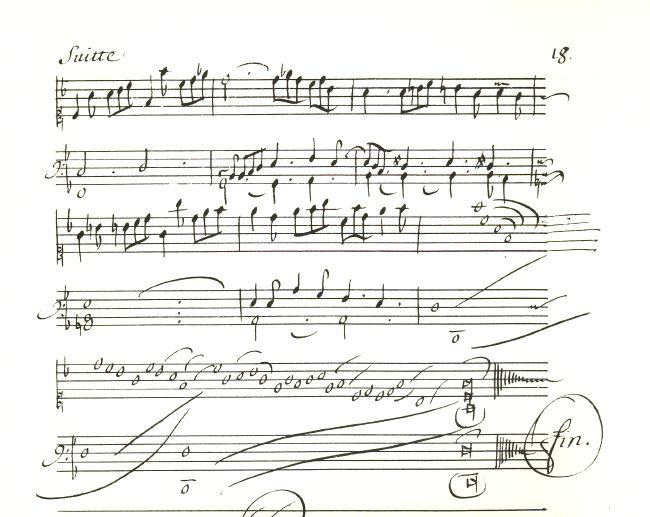

The Bauyn manuscript is a manuscript in possession of the Bibliothèque Nationale de France in Paris (catalogue number Rés. Vm7 674–675). It is, along with several printed collections and the Parville manuscript, one of the most important sources for French harpsichord music of the 17th century.

The Bauyn manuscript was created somewhere around 1690, when the only published harpsichord pieces were those by Jacques Champion de Chambonnières, Nicolas Lebègue and perhaps, depending on the exact date, Élisabeth Jacquet de la Guerre (1687) and Jean-Henri d'Anglebert (1689). The name comes from the Bauyn d'Angervilliers family, who once possessed the manuscript. The manuscript is in upright format; the pieces are grouped according to their genre, not in suites; some are organized by key.

Included are almost all known harpsichord pieces by Louis Couperin and Chambonnières, with more than 142 pieces by Chambonnières and more than 20 pieces by Johann Jakob Froberger and music by several other composers, including Joseph Chabanceau de La Barre, Jacques Hardel, Étienne Richard and Girolamo Frescobaldi. Most important of all the pieces are the 122 works by Louis Couperin, who was one of the most important European composers of the time and who never published any of his works; the Bauyn manuscript is a principal source for his harpsichord oeuvre.

== See also ==
- French baroque harpsichordists
