= Coulonces =

Coulonces is the name of several communes in France:

- Coulonces, Calvados, in the Calvados département
- Coulonces, Orne, in the Orne département
