= Excerpts from Eternity =

Book on analysis of Chaconne

First edition (Hungarian) Published by BioBach-Music

Excerpts from Eternity is a book presenting a detailed analysis of the structure of Johann Sebastian Bach's renowned Chaconne from his Partita for Violin No. 2, BWV 1004, and explores the essential context of its external and internal forms and proportions. Its full title is The Purification of Time and Character, the Fulfilment of Love and Cooperation with the Celestial Will in Johann Sebastian Bach's Ciaccona for Violin. The authors unravel the secret of the Chaconne; this new remarkable discovery is unique even in the field of art history: a time-code which has been lying dormant for almost 300 years. The book was published in Hungarian, Részletek az örökkévalóságból, and English in 2017.

- Barnabás Dukay; Márta Ábrahám. Excerpts from Eternity (2017 hardcover, 148 pages). BioBach-Music Book-and Music Publishing L.P. ISBN 978-963-12-8865-0
