= Roullours =

- Part of Vire Normandie
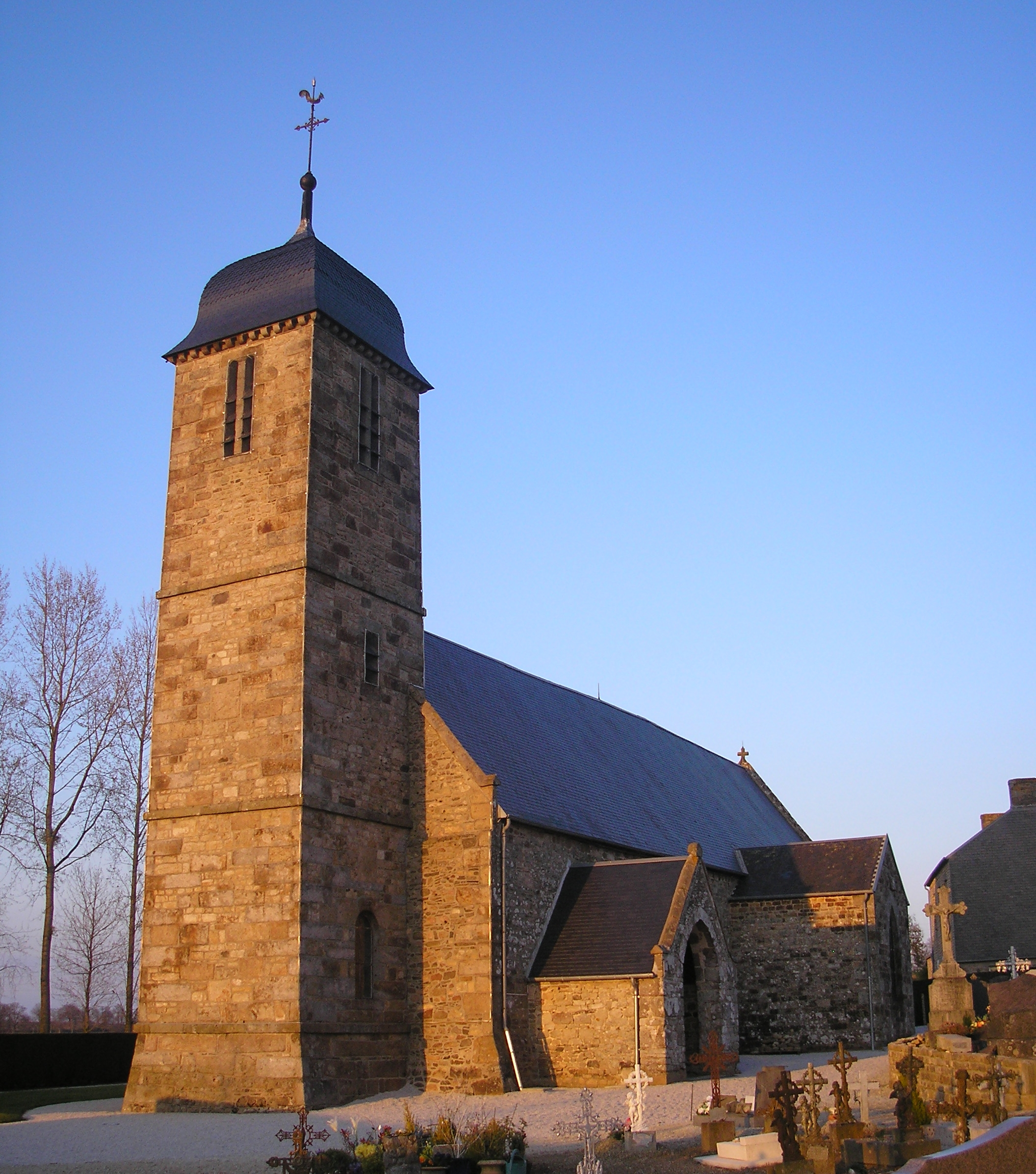
- Saint Martin
- Location of Roullours
- Location within France Location within Normandy
- Coordinates: 48°50′00″N 0°50′19″W
- Country: France
- Region: Normandy
- Department: Calvados
- Arrondissement: Vire
- Canton: Vire Normandie
- Commune: Vire Normandie
- Area^{1}: 13.15 km^{2} (5.08 sq mi)
- Elevation: 312 m (1,024 ft)
- Highest elevation: 308 m (1,010 ft)
- Lowest elevation: 169 m (554 ft)
- Population (2023): 844
  - Density: 64.2/km^{2} (166/sq mi)
- Time zone: UTC+01:00 (CET)
  - Summer (DST): UTC+02:00 (CEST)
- Postal code: 14500
- ^{1} French Land Register data, which excludes lakes, ponds, glaciers > 1 km^{2} (0.386 sq mi or 247 acres) and river estuaries.

Roullours (French pronunciation: [ʁuluʁ]) is a former commune in the Calvados department in the Normandy region in northwestern France. On 1 January 2016, it was merged into the new commune of Vire Normandie.

== See also ==
- Communes of the Calvados department
