= Truttemer-le-Petit =

- Part of Vire Normandie
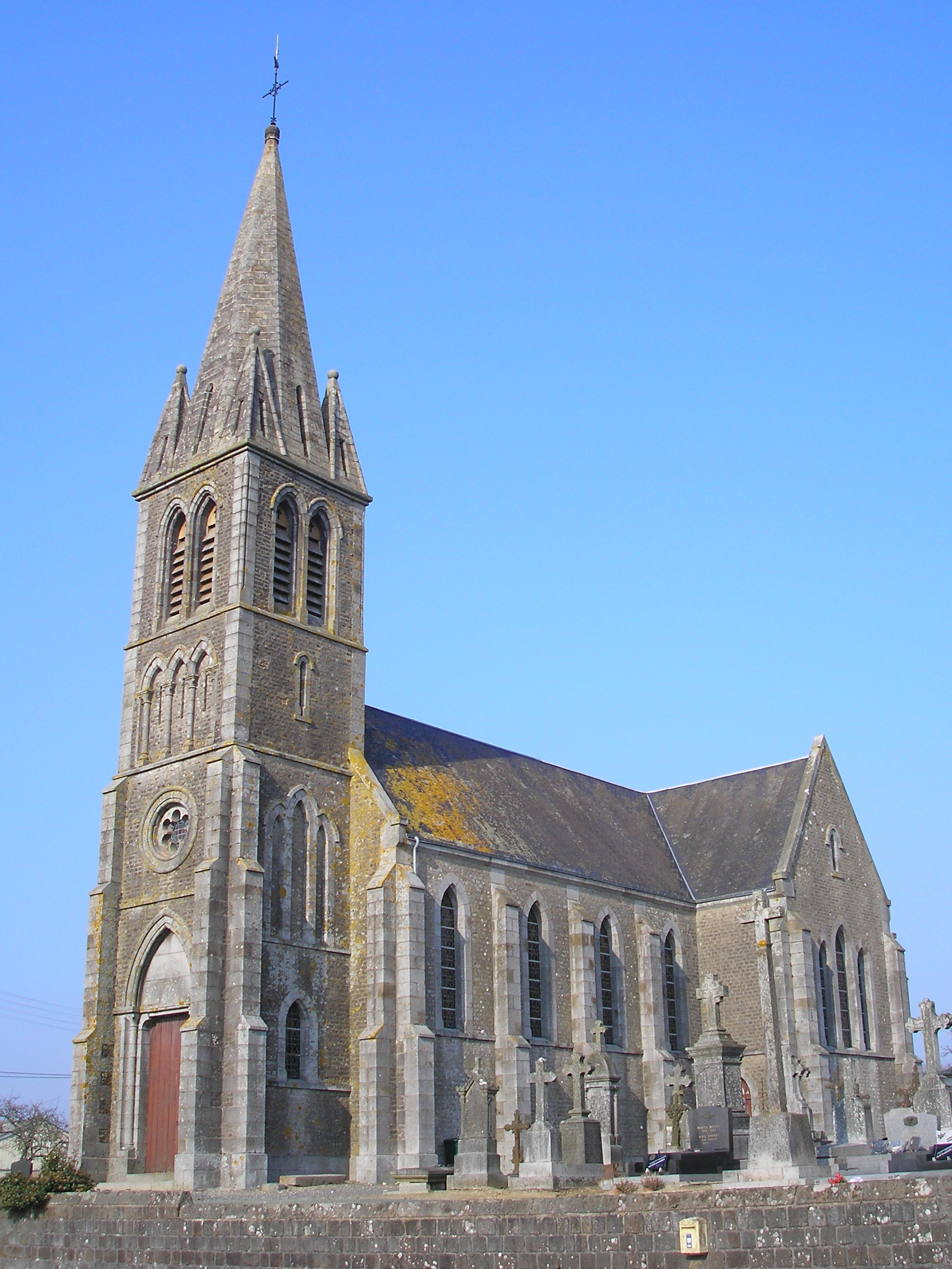
- Location of Truttemer-le-Petit
- Location within France Location within Normandy
- Coordinates: 48°46′24″N 0°48′49″W
- Country: France
- Region: Normandy
- Department: Calvados
- Arrondissement: Vire
- Canton: Vire Normandie
- Commune: Vire Normandie
- Area^{1}: 5.28 km^{2} (2.04 sq mi)
- Highest elevation: 310 m (1,020 ft)
- Lowest elevation: 229 m (751 ft)
- Population (2023): 113
  - Density: 21.4/km^{2} (55.4/sq mi)
- Time zone: UTC+01:00 (CET)
  - Summer (DST): UTC+02:00 (CEST)
- Postal code: 14500
- ^{1} French Land Register data, which excludes lakes, ponds, glaciers > 1 km^{2} (0.386 sq mi or 247 acres) and river estuaries.

Truttemer-le-Petit (French pronunciation: [tʁytmɛʁ lə pəti]) is a former commune in the Calvados department in the Normandy region in northwestern France. On 1 January 2016, it was merged into the new commune of Vire Normandie.

== See also ==
- Communes of the Calvados department
