= Saint-Germain-de-Tallevende-la-Lande-Vaumont =

- Part of Vire Normandie
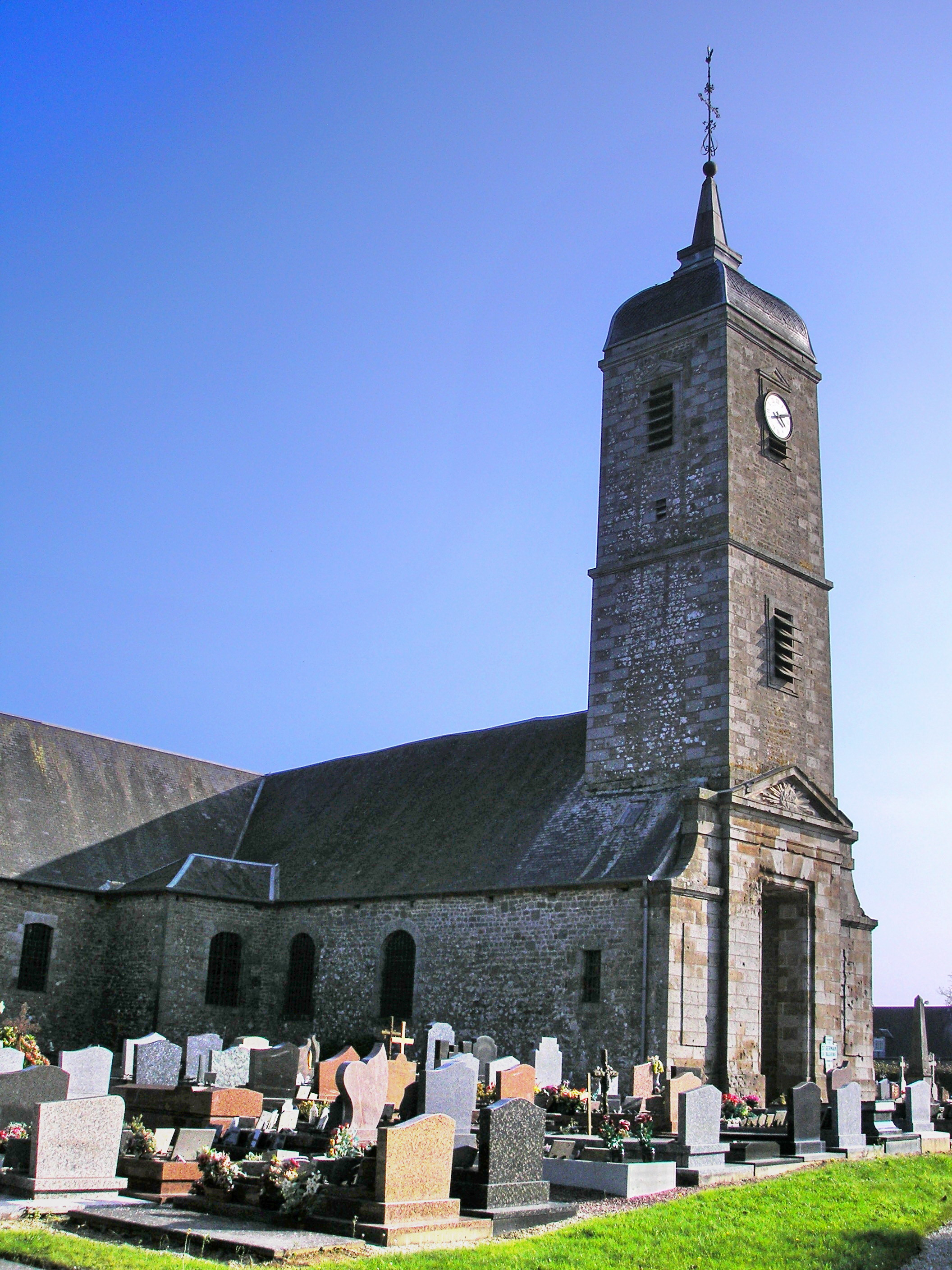
- Location of Saint-Germain-de-Tallevende-la-Lande-Vaumont
- Location within France Location within Normandy
- Coordinates: 48°48′05″N 0°54′04″W
- Country: France
- Region: Normandy
- Department: Calvados
- Arrondissement: Vire
- Canton: Vire Normandie
- Commune: Vire Normandie
- Area^{1}: 41.89 km^{2} (16.17 sq mi)
- Elevation: 200 m (660 ft)
- Highest elevation: 351 m (1,152 ft)
- Lowest elevation: 125 m (410 ft)
- Population (2022): 2,045
  - Density: 48.82/km^{2} (126.4/sq mi)
- Time zone: UTC+01:00 (CET)
  - Summer (DST): UTC+02:00 (CEST)
- Postal code: 14500
- ^{1} French Land Register data, which excludes lakes, ponds, glaciers > 1 km^{2} (0.386 sq mi or 247 acres) and river estuaries.

Saint-Germain-de-Tallevende-la-Lande-Vaumont (French pronunciation: [sɛ̃ ʒɛʁmɛ̃ də talvɑ̃d la lɑ̃d vomɔ̃]) is a former commune in Calvados, a department in the Normandy region in northwestern France. It was created in 1972 by the merger of the former communes Saint-Germain-de-Tallevende and La Lande-Vaumont. On 1 January 2016, it was merged into the new commune of Vire Normandie.

== Population ==
Historical population
Year	Pop.	±% p.a.
1975	1,489	—
1982	1,650	+1.48%
1990	1,584	−0.51%
1999	1,731	+0.99%
2006	1,923	+1.51%
2022	2,045	+0.39%
Source: EHESS and INSEE

== See also ==
- Communes of the Calvados department
