= Vire Normandie =

- Subprefecture and commune
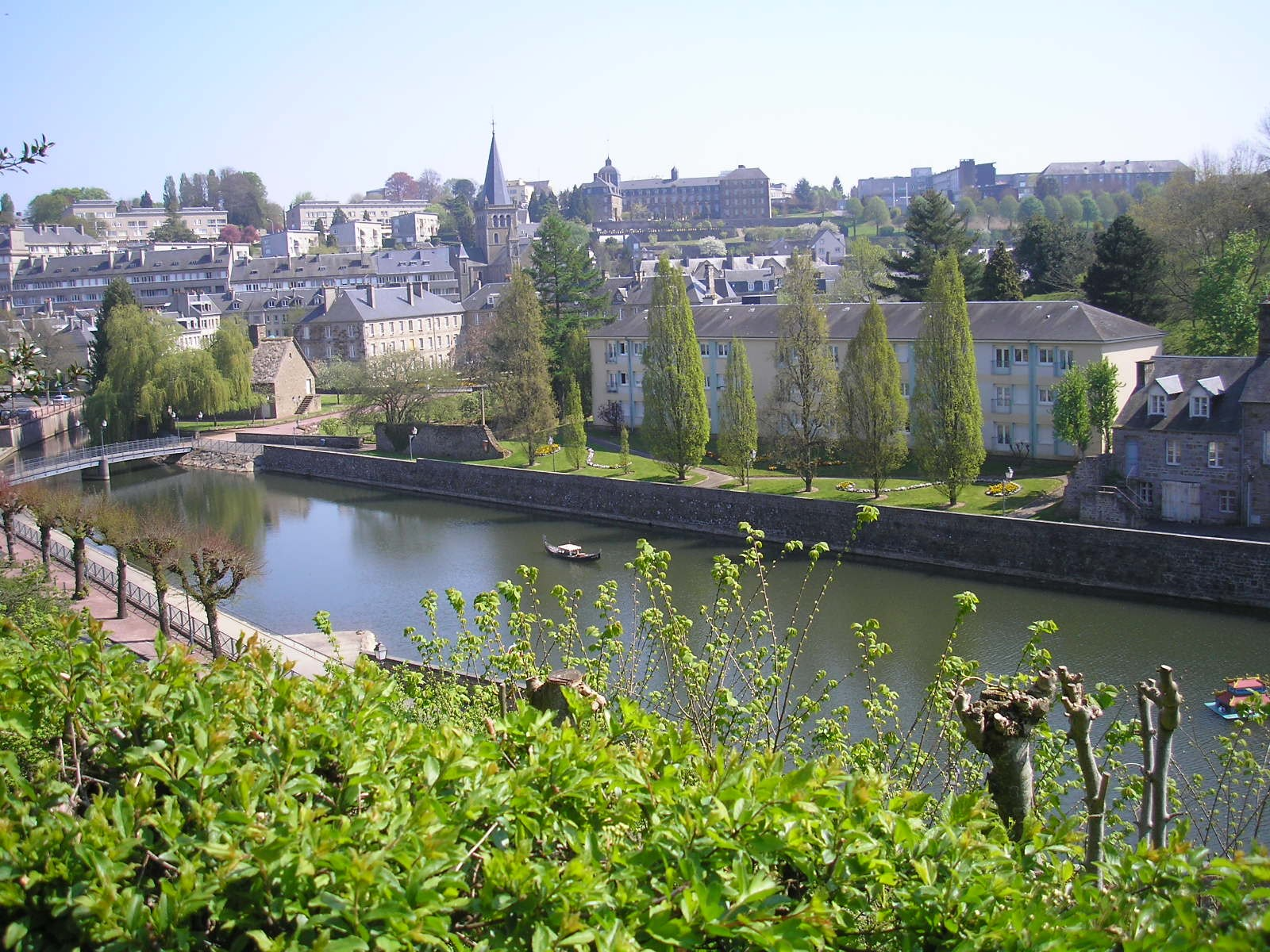
- The lock, the church, and surroundings
- Location of Vire Normandie
- Location within France Location within Normandy
- Coordinates: 48°50′17″N 0°53′20″W
- Country: France
- Region: Normandy
- Department: Calvados
- Arrondissement: Vire
- Canton: Vire Normandie
- Intercommunality: Intercom de la Vire au Noireau

Government
  - Mayor (2024–2026): Nicole Desmottes
- Area^{1}: 138.52 km^{2} (53.48 sq mi)
- Population (2023): 17,457
  - Density: 126.03/km^{2} (326.40/sq mi)
- Time zone: UTC+01:00 (CET)
  - Summer (DST): UTC+02:00 (CEST)
- INSEE/Postal code: 14762 /14500
- ^{1} French Land Register data, which excludes lakes, ponds, glaciers > 1 km^{2} (0.386 sq mi or 247 acres) and river estuaries.

Vire Normandie (French pronunciation: [viʁ nɔʁmɑ̃di]) is a commune in the Calvados department and Normandy region of north-western France.

It was established on 1 January 2016 as a result of the merger of the former communes of Vire (seat of the new municipality), Coulonces, Maisoncelles-la-Jourdan, Roullours, Saint-Germain-de-Tallevende-la-Lande-Vaumont, Truttemer-le-Grand, Truttemer-le-Petit and Vaudry.

Vire Normandie is the administrative centre (chef-lieu) of the arrondissement of Vire. Vire station has rail connections to Argentan, Paris and Granville.

== Population ==
Population data refer to the commune in its geography as of January 2025.

Historical population
Year	Pop.	±% p.a.
1968	16,889	—
1975	18,334	+1.18%
1982	19,050	+0.55%
1990	18,397	−0.44%
1999	18,564	+0.10%
2007	18,562	−0.00%
2012	17,884	−0.74%
2017	17,178	−0.80%
2023	17,457	+0.27%
Source: INSEE

== Sport ==
AF Virois is the local football team based at the stade Pierre-Compte.

== Twin towns – sister cities ==
Vire Normandie is twinned with:

- Baunatal, Germany
- Săcele, Romania
- Santa Fe, Spain
- Totnes, England, United Kingdom

== See also ==
- Communes of the Calvados department
