= Truttemer-le-Grand =

- Part of Vire Normandie
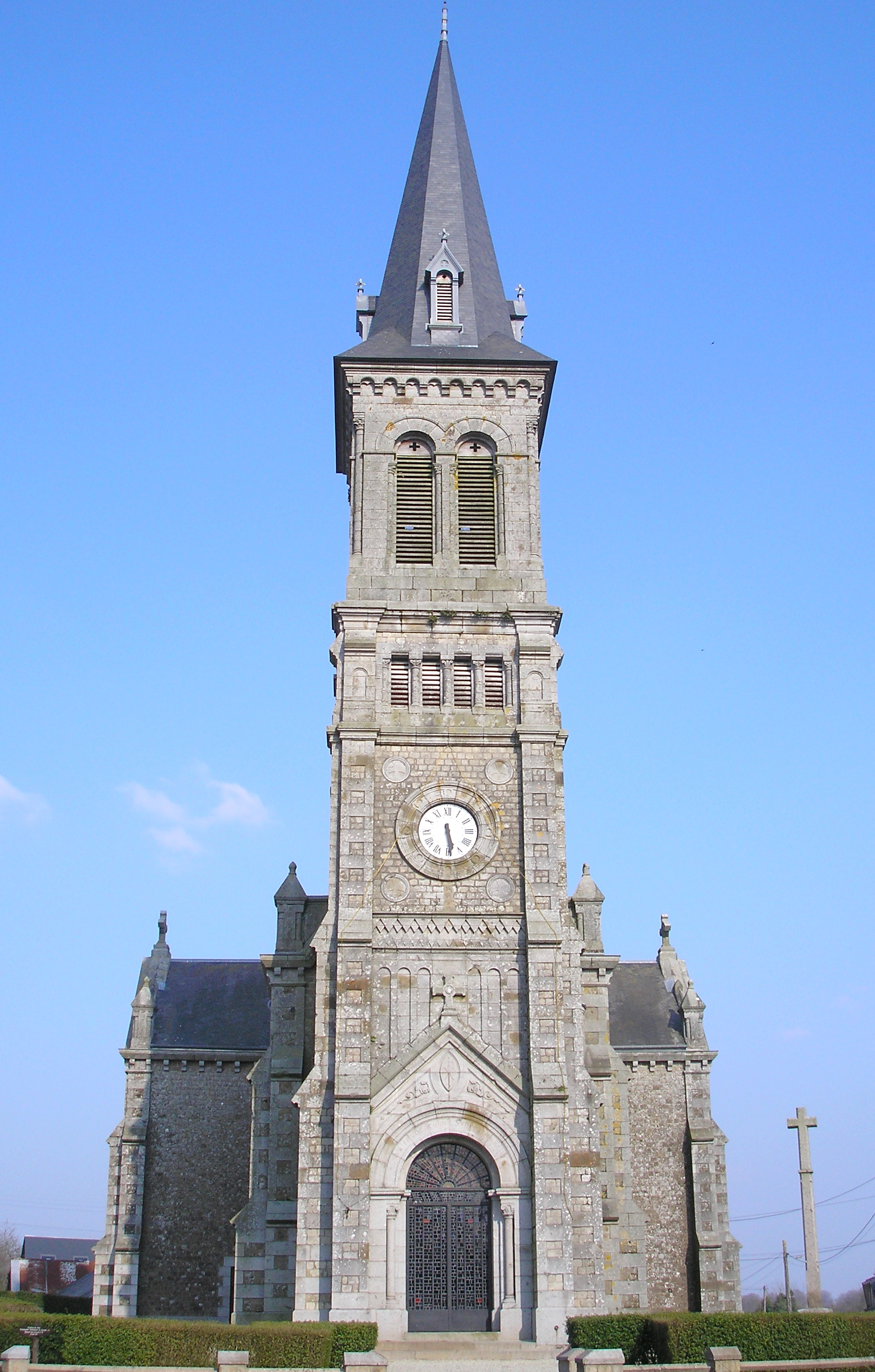
- Location of Truttemer-le-Grand
- Location within France Location within Normandy
- Coordinates: 48°46′54″N 0°49′03″W
- Country: France
- Region: Normandy
- Department: Calvados
- Arrondissement: Vire
- Canton: Vire Normandie
- Commune: Vire Normandie
- Area^{1}: 14.69 km^{2} (5.67 sq mi)
- Elevation: 250 m (820 ft)
- Highest elevation: 302 m (991 ft)
- Lowest elevation: 197 m (646 ft)
- Population (2023): 689
  - Density: 46.9/km^{2} (121/sq mi)
- Time zone: UTC+01:00 (CET)
  - Summer (DST): UTC+02:00 (CEST)
- Postal code: 14500
- ^{1} French Land Register data, which excludes lakes, ponds, glaciers > 1 km^{2} (0.386 sq mi or 247 acres) and river estuaries.

Truttemer-le-Grand (French pronunciation: [tʁytmɛʁ lə ɡʁɑ̃]) is a former commune in the Calvados department in the Normandy region in northwestern France. On 1 January 2016, it was merged into the new commune of Vire Normandie.

== See also ==
- Communes of the Calvados department
