= Coulonces, Calvados =

Coulonces
- Part of Vire Normandie
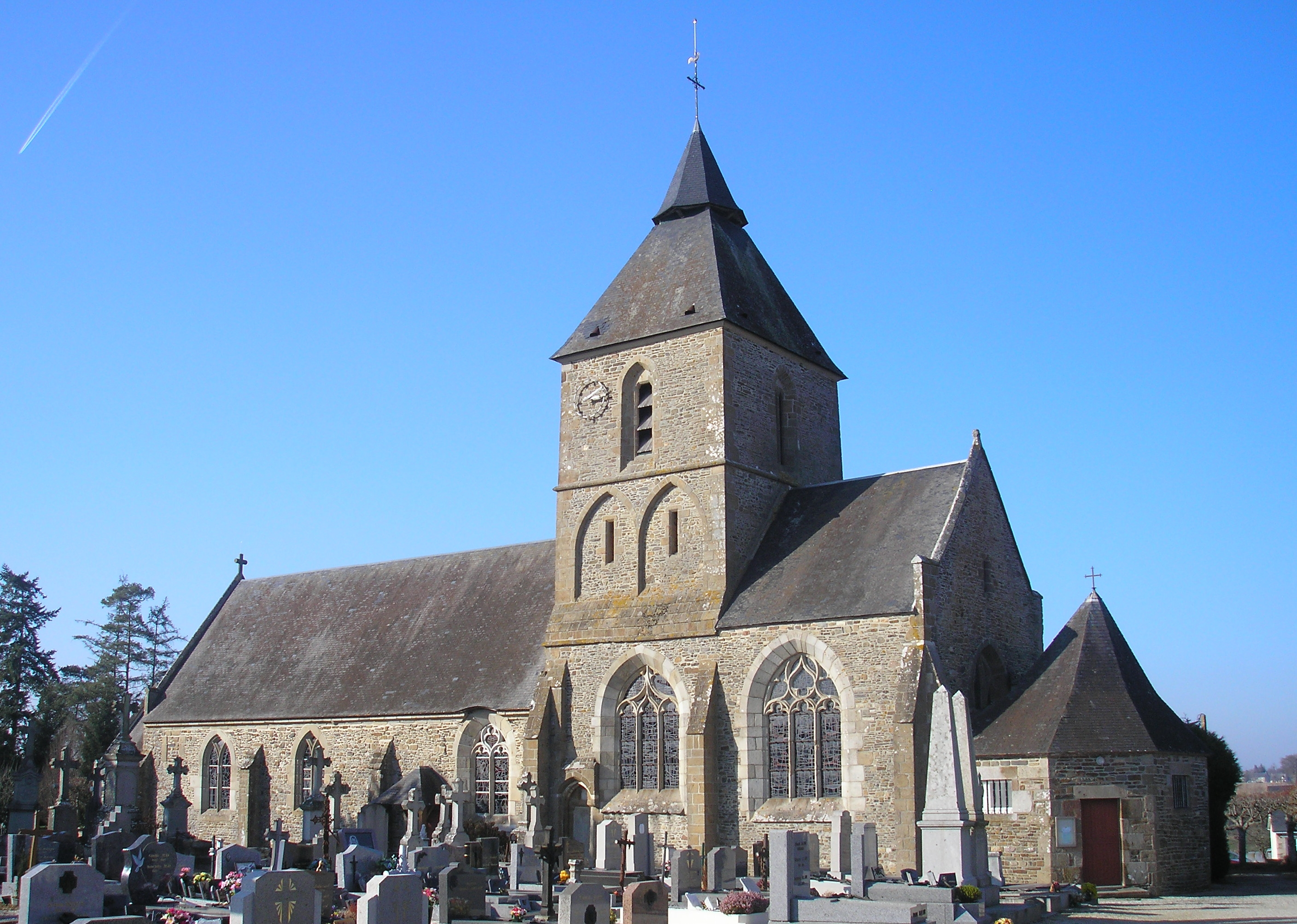
- Saint-Gilles
- Location of Coulonces
- Location within France Location within Normandy
- Coordinates: 48°52′31″N 0°54′47″W
- Country: France
- Region: Normandy
- Department: Calvados
- Arrondissement: Vire
- Canton: Vire Normandie
- Commune: Vire Normandie
- Area^{1}: 15.58 km^{2} (6.02 sq mi)
- Elevation: 87 m (285 ft)
- Highest elevation: 196 m (643 ft)
- Lowest elevation: 84 m (276 ft)
- Population (2023): 806
  - Density: 51.7/km^{2} (134/sq mi)
- Time zone: UTC+01:00 (CET)
  - Summer (DST): UTC+02:00 (CEST)
- Postal code: 14500
- ^{1} French Land Register data, which excludes lakes, ponds, glaciers > 1 km^{2} (0.386 sq mi or 247 acres) and river estuaries.

Coulonces (French pronunciation: [kulɔ̃s]) is a former commune in the Calvados department in the Normandy region in northwestern France. On 1 January 2016, it was merged into the new commune of Vire Normandie.

== Geography ==
Located on the banks of the Brévogne, it is a typical village of the Bocage Virois. The village is 4 km southwest of La Graverie, 5 km northwest of Vire, and 12 km east of Saint-Sever-Calvados. The highest point (196 m) is located in the south-western area, and the lowest point (84 m) is in the northeast.

== See also ==
- Communes of the Calvados department
