= Vaudry =

- Part of Vire Normandie
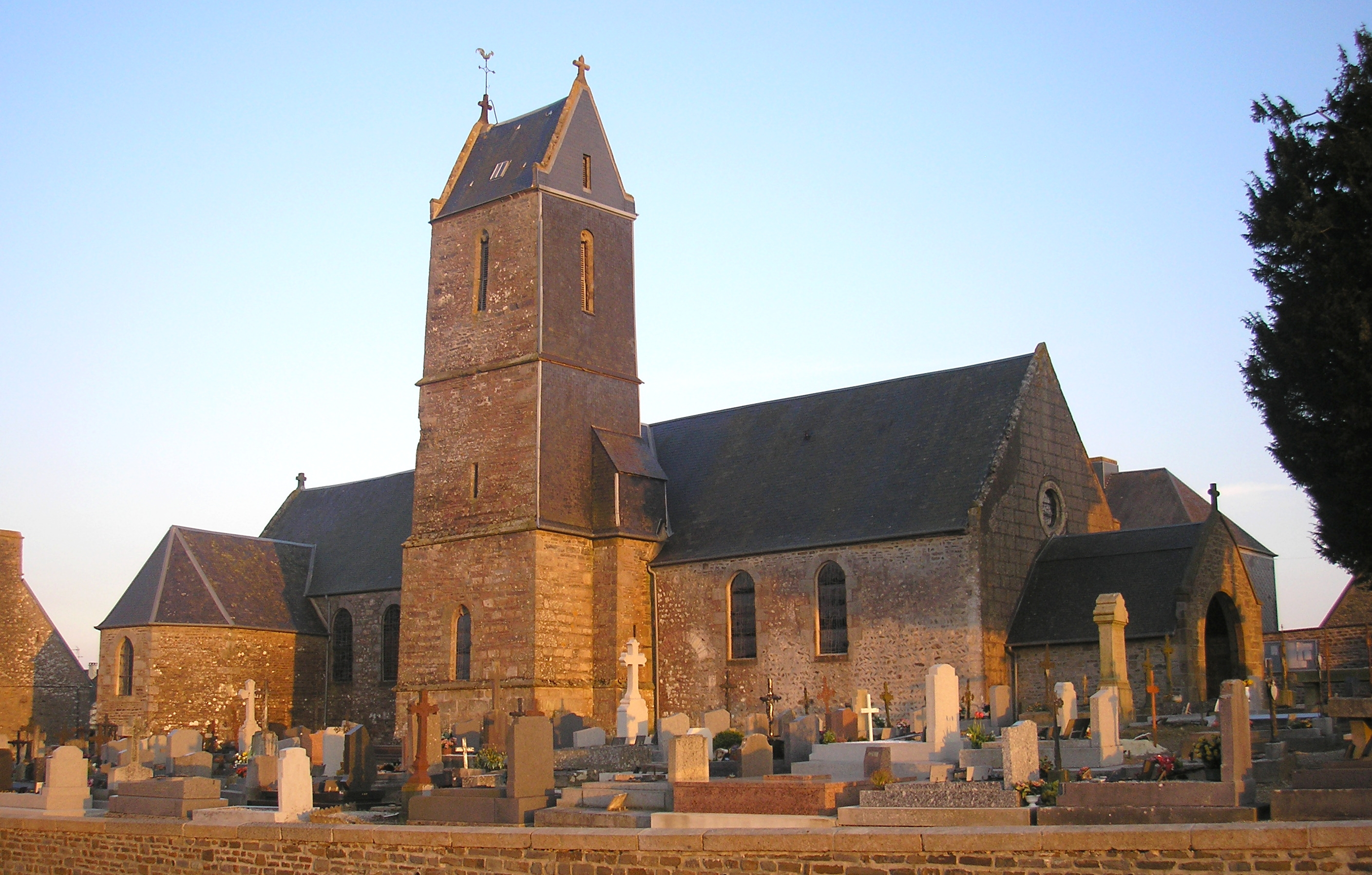
- Location of Vaudry
- Location within France Location within Normandy
- Coordinates: 48°50′30″N 0°51′11″W
- Country: France
- Region: Normandy
- Department: Calvados
- Arrondissement: Vire
- Canton: Vire Normandie
- Commune: Vire Normandie
- Area^{1}: 11.89 km^{2} (4.59 sq mi)
- Highest elevation: 261 m (856 ft)
- Lowest elevation: 106 m (348 ft)
- Population (2022): 1,479
  - Density: 124.4/km^{2} (322.2/sq mi)
- Time zone: UTC+01:00 (CET)
  - Summer (DST): UTC+02:00 (CEST)
- Postal code: 14500
- ^{1} French Land Register data, which excludes lakes, ponds, glaciers > 1 km^{2} (0.386 sq mi or 247 acres) and river estuaries.

Vaudry (French pronunciation: [vodʁi]) is a former commune in the Calvados department in the Normandy region in northwestern France. On 1 January 2016, it was merged into the new commune of Vire Normandie.

== Population ==
Historical population

Year	Pop.	±% p.a.
1793	822	—
1800	755	−1.21%
1806	774	+0.42%
1821	1,288	+3.45%
1831	1,492	+1.48%
1836	1,513	+0.28%
1841	1,482	−0.41%
1846	1,485	+0.04%
1851	1,519	+0.45%
1856	1,546	+0.35%
1861	1,558	+0.15%
1866	1,654	+1.20%
1872	1,373	−3.06%
1876	1,595	+3.82%
1881	1,399	−2.59%
1886	1,294	−1.55%
1891	1,340	+0.70%

Year	Pop.	±% p.a.
1896	1,307	−0.50%
1901	1,345	+0.57%
1906	1,264	−1.23%
1911	1,204	−0.97%
1921	1,102	−0.88%
1926	1,218	+2.02%
1931	1,214	−0.07%
1936	1,232	+0.29%
1946	1,883	+4.33%
1954	1,705	−1.23%
1962	1,462	−1.90%
1968	1,291	−2.05%
1975	1,265	−0.29%
1982	1,391	+1.37%
1990	1,445	+0.48%
1999	1,449	+0.03%
2022	1,479	+0.09%

Source: EHESS and INSEE

== See also ==
- Communes of the Calvados department
