= Skip Sempé =

American harpsichordist and conductor

Skip Sempé (born 1958 in New Orleans) is an American harpsichordist and conductor of the ensemble Capriccio Stravagante.

== Selected discography ==
- Lully: divertissements - highlights from tragédie lyrique and comédie ballet. Guillemette Laurens Capriccio Stravagante. Skip Sempé DHM
