= Sarabande =

Music genre and type of dance

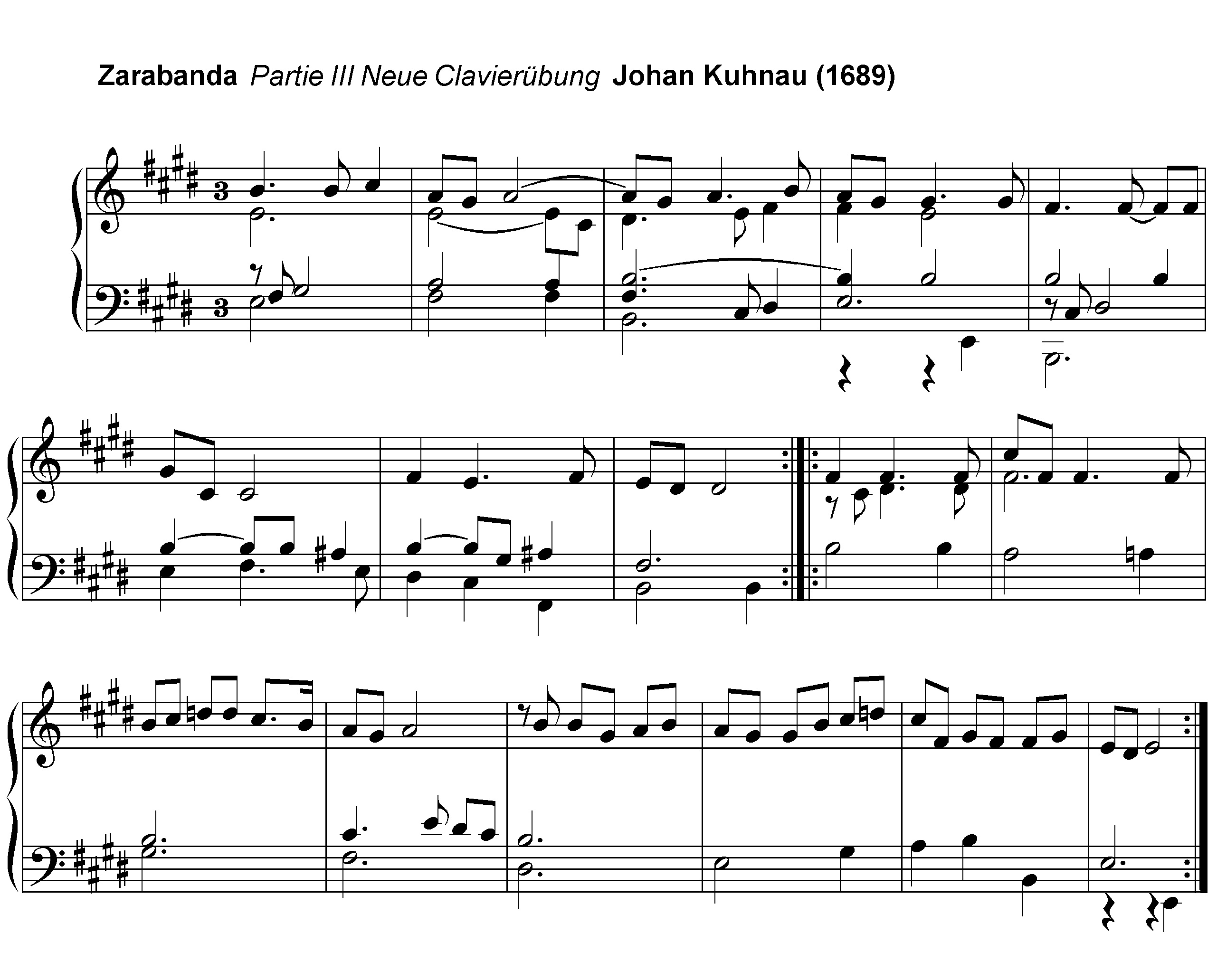
A sarabande in binary form by Johann Kuhnau

The sarabande (from Spanish: zarabanda) is a dance in triple metre, or the music written for such a dance.

== History ==
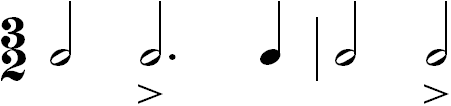
Sarabanda

The Sarabande evolved from a Spanish dance with Arab influences, danced by a lively double line of couples with castanets. A dance called zarabanda is first mentioned in 1539 in Central America in the poem Vida y tiempo de Maricastaña, written in Panama by Fernando de Guzmán Mejía. In 1596, Alonso López, "el Pinciano", traces its origins even to the cult of Dionysus. The dance seems to have been especially popular in the 16th and 17th centuries, initially in Spain and in the Spanish colonies.

The Jesuit priest Juan de Mariana thought it indecent, describing it in his Tratato contra los juegos públicos (Treatise Against Public Amusements, 1609) as "a dance and song so loose in its words and so ugly in its motions that it is enough to excite bad emotions in even very decent people". A character in an entremés by Cervantes alluded to the dance's notoriety by saying that hell was its "birthplace and breeding place" (in Spanish: origen y principio). It was banned in Spain in 1583 but was nevertheless still performed and frequently cited in literature of the period (for instance, by Lope de Vega).

It spread to Italy in the 17th century, and to France, where it became a slow court dance.

The sarabande was used throughout much of classical music, especially in the baroque era: for example, the music of French baroque composer Jean-Marie Leclair (born 1697): Sonata for 2 violins in D major Op.12 no.3; and Buxtehude's Trio Sonata in E minor Op.1/7 BuxWV 258, an extraordinary work with this sarabande style, most likely influencing later baroque composers such as Handel and Bach, who also have notable works using the same theme.

Baroque musicians of the 18th century wrote suites of dance music in binary form that typically included a sarabande as the third of four movements. It was often paired with and followed by a jig or gigue. Bach sometimes gave the sarabande a privileged place in his music, where it is often the heart of his suites for cello or keyboard. And outside the context of dance suites, striking examples include the theme (aria) and the 13th and 26th variations from Bach's Goldberg Variations; and the final movements of both the St. John and St. Matthew Passions.

The anonymous harmonic sequence known as La Folia appears in pieces of various types, mainly dances, by dozens of composers from the time of Mudarra (1546) and Corelli through to the present day, custom perhaps influenced by its Spanish origin. The theme of the fourth-movement Sarabande of Handel's Keyboard suite in D minor (HWV 437) for harpsichord, one of these many pieces, appears prominently in the film Barry Lyndon.

The sarabande was revived in the 19th and early 20th centuries by the German composer Louis Spohr (in his Salonstücke, Op. 135 of 1847), Norwegian composer Edvard Grieg (in his Holberg Suite of 1884), French composers such as Debussy and Satie, and in England, in different styles, Vaughan Williams (in Job: A Masque for Dancing), Benjamin Britten (in the Simple Symphony), Herbert Howells (in Six Pieces for Organ: Saraband for the Morning of Easter), and Carlos Chávez in the ballet La hija de Cólquide.

The sarabande inspired the title of Ingmar Bergman's last film Saraband (2003). The film uses the sarabande from Bach's Fifth Cello Suite, which Bergman also used in Cries and Whispers (1972).
