= Courante =

Family of triple metre dances

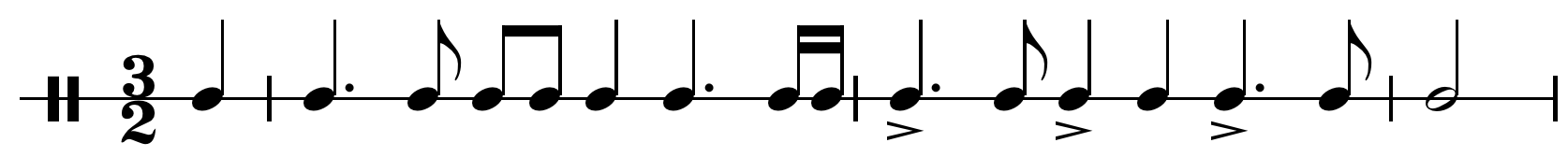
A courante rhythm

The courante, corrente, coranto and corant are some of the names given to a family of triple metre dances from the late Renaissance and the Baroque era. In a Baroque dance suite an Italian or French courante is typically paired with a preceding allemande, making it the second movement of the suite or the third if there is a prelude.

== Types ==
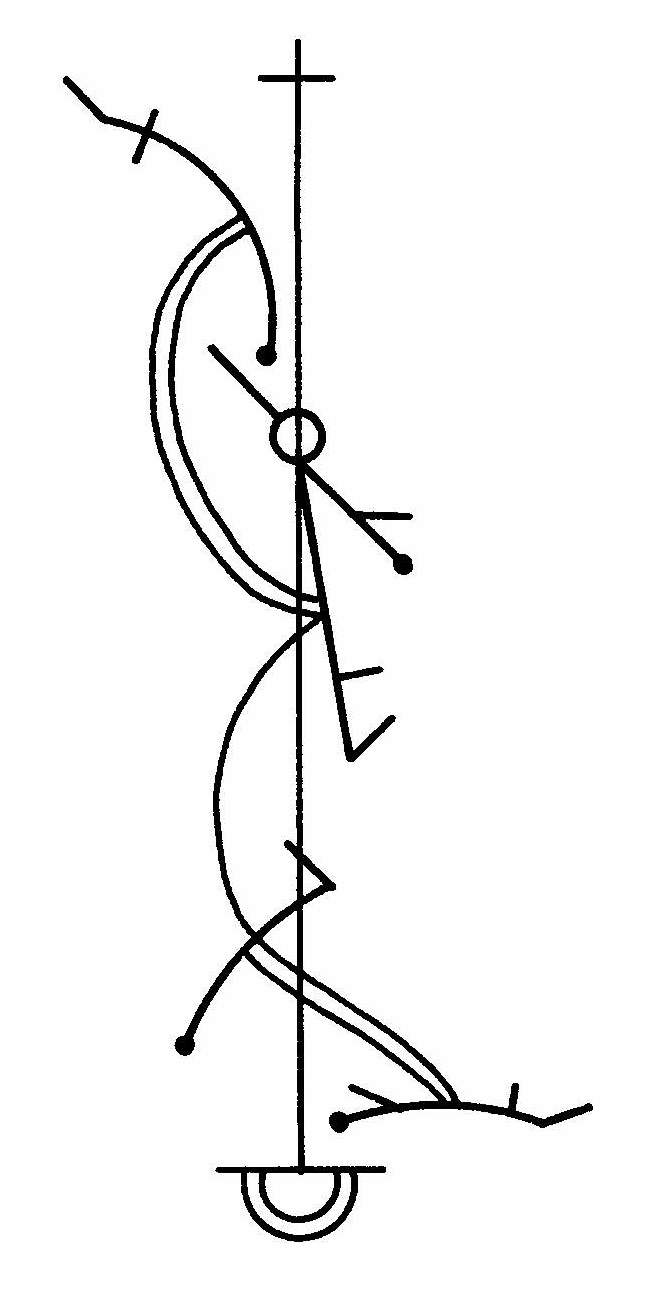
Beauchamp–Feuillet notation: the steps of a courante

Courante literally means "running", and in the later Renaissance the courante was danced with fast running and jumping steps, as described by Thoinot Arbeau. But the courante commonly used in the baroque period was described by Johann Mattheson in Der vollkommene Capellmeister (Hamburg, 1739) as "chiefly characterized by the passion or mood of sweet expectation. For there is something heartfelt, something longing and also gratifying, in this melody: clearly music on which hopes are built." Johann Gottfried Walther in the Musicalisches Lexicon (Leipzig, 1732), wrote that the rhythm of the courante is "absolutely the most serious one can find."

During the Baroque era there were two types of courante; the French and the Italian. The French type is usually notated in 3/2, but employing rhythmic and metrical ambiguities (especially hemiola), and had the slowest tempo of all French court dances, described by Mattheson, Quantz and Rousseau as grave and majestic, while the Italian type was a significantly faster dance.

Sometimes French and Italian spellings are used to distinguish types of courante, but original spellings were inconsistent. Bach uses courante and corrente to differentiate the French and Italian styles respectively in his Partitas of the Clavierübung and, in Dance and the Music of J. S. Bach by Meredith Little and Natalie Jenne, the courante and corrente are treated as distinct dances, but editors have frequently ignored the distinction.

In Bach's unaccompanied Partita for Violin No. 2 the first movement (titled Allemanda) begins as if in 3/4 time in a manner one might initially perform and hear as a courante. The second movement is titled corrente and is rather lively. An indication of faster tempo that appears to exist in Baroque composer Georg Muffat's instructions on Lullian bowing is a confusion in translation.

== See also ==
- Baroque dance
- Renaissance dance
