= Allemande =

Renaissance and Baroque dance style

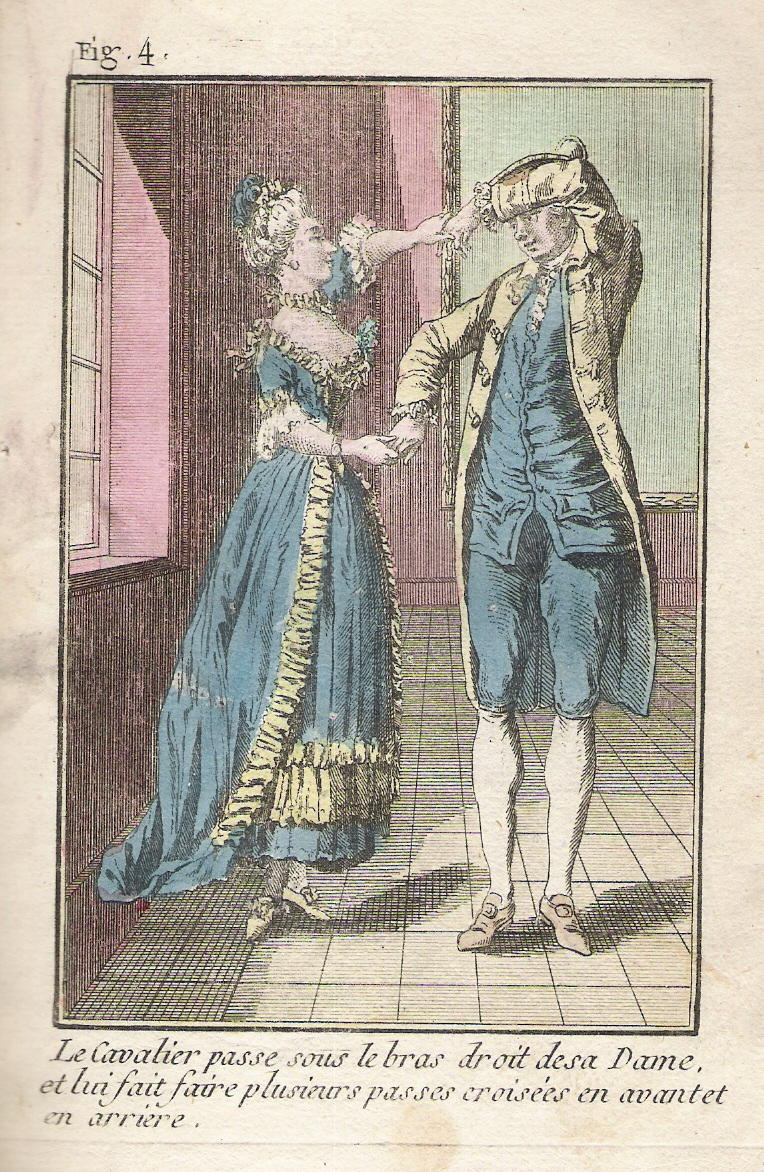
Allemande, from a dancing manual of c. 1769

An allemande (French pronunciation: [almɑ̃d], "German (dance)"; also allemanda, almain(e), or alman(d)) is a Renaissance and Baroque dance, and one of the most common instrumental dance styles in Baroque music, with examples by Couperin, Purcell, Bach and Handel. It is often the first movement of a Baroque suite of dances, paired with a subsequent courante, though it is sometimes preceded by an introduction or prelude. Along with the waltz and ländler, the allemande was sometimes referred to by the generic term German Dance in publications during the late 18th and early 19th centuries.

A quite different, later, Allemande, named as such in the time of Mozart and Beethoven, still survives in Germany and Switzerland and is a lively triple-time social dance related to the waltz and the Ländler.

The name "Allemande" comes from the name of Germany in French.

== History ==
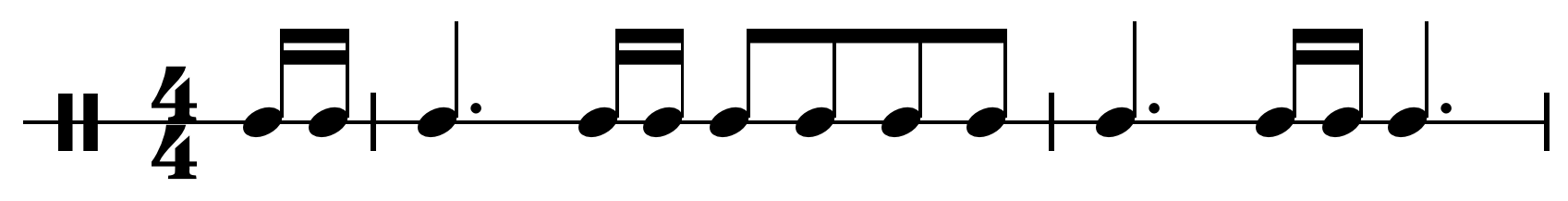
Allemande rhythm.

The allemande originated in the 16th century as a duple metre dance of moderate tempo, already considered very old, with a characteristic "double-knocking" upbeat of two or occasionally three sixteenth notes. It appears to have derived from a German dance but no identifiable dance and no German dance instructions from this era survive.

The 16th-century French dancing master Thoinot Arbeau and the British Inns of Court therefore preserve the first records of the allemande, in which dancers formed a line of couples who took hands and walked the length of the room, walking three steps then balancing on one foot. A livelier version, the allemande courante, used three springing steps and a hop. Elizabethan British composers wrote many "Almans" as separate pieces.

French composers of the 17th century experimented with the allemande, shifting to quadruple meter and ranging more widely in tempo. This slower allemande, like the pavane, was adapted to the tombeau or memorial composition. The German composers Froberger and Bach followed suit in their allemandes for keyboard instruments, although ensemble allemandes kept a more traditional style. Italian and English composers were more free with the allemande, writing in counterpoint and using a variety of tempi (Corelli wrote allemandes ranging from largo to presto).

In his Musikalisches Lexicon (Leipzig, 1732), Johann Gottfried Walther wrote that the allemande "must be composed and likewise danced in a grave and ceremonious manner." Likewise in Der Vollkommene Capellmeister (Hamburg, 1739) Johann Mattheson described the allemande as "a serious and well-composed harmoniousness in arpeggiated style, expressing satisfaction or amusement, and delighting in order and calm". Its music is characterised by absence of syncopation, combination of short motifs into larger units and contrasts of tone and motif.

Some of the close embraces and turns of the allemande were carried over to square dance and contra dance. In an allemande, couples hold one forearm and turn around each other to the left or right.

== Triple meter dance ==
Late in the 18th century, "allemande" or "German Dance" came to be used for another type of dance in triple meter. Weber's Douze allemandes op. 4 of 1801 anticipate the waltz. Mozart and Beethoven both produced sets of German Dances in this style. A different version went on to become the Ländler.

== Sources ==
- Scholes, Percy A. (1970). John Owen Ward (ed.). The Oxford Companion to Music (tenth, revised and rest ed.). Oxford and New York: Oxford University Press. ISBN 978-0-19-311306-0..
