= 1674 in music =

List of years in music	(table)
- … 1664; 1665; 1666; 1667; 1668; 1669; 1670; 1671; 1672; 1673; 1674; 1675; 1676; 1677; 1678; 1679; 1680; 1681; 1682; 1683; 1684 …
- Art; Archaeology; Architecture; Literature; Music; Philosophy; Science; +...

The year 1674 in music involved some significant events.

== Events ==
- April – Thomas Shadwell produces a revision of the Dryden/Davenant version of Shakespeare's The Tempest. Furnished with music by John Bannister, Giovanni Battista Draghi, Pelham Humfrey, Pietro Reggio, and Matthew Locke, it became a great popular success.
- September 29 – Nicholas Staggins is appointed Master of the Kings Music
- Johann Aegidius Bach is appointed organist at the Kaufmannskirche in Erfurt
- John Blow is appointed Master of the Children of the Chapel Royal
- Johannes Voorhout paints the only known portrait of Dieterich Buxtehude.
- Giovanni Paolo Colonna becomes chapelmaster at Bologna.
- Ariane, ou Le Mariage de Bacchus, by Robert Cambert, is one of the first French operas to be sung in Britain.

== Classical music ==
- Heinrich Biber
  - Missa Christi resurgentis à 20
  - Mystery (Rosary) Sonatas
- Dieterich Buxtehude
  - Fried- und Freudenreiche Hinfarth, published in Lübeck (consisting of Mit Fried und Freud, composed 1671, and Klag-Lied)
  - Klag-Lied: Muß der Tod denn auch entbinden, chorale settings
  - Drei schöne Dinge sind, BuxWV 19
- Cristofaro Caresana
  - La caccia del toro
  - La Veglia
- Marc-Antoine Charpentier
  - Laudate Dominum, H.159
  - Domine Dominus noster, H.163
  - Pour Ste. Anne, H.315
- Francesco Corbetta – La Guitarre Royalle
- Carolus Hacquart – Cantiones sacrae, Op.1
- Bishop Thomas Ken – "Morning Hymn" (based upon Psalm 108.2)
- Maria Francesca Nascimbeni – Mottetto Sitientes venite
- Pavel Josef Vejvanovský – Sonata Natalis (composed for the Christmas season)
- Gaspar Sanz – Instrucción de Música

== Opera ==
- Jean-Baptiste Lully – Alceste

== Births ==
- January 9 – Reinhard Keiser, opera composer (died 1739)
- July 11 or July 16 – Isaac Watts, the "father of English hymnody" (died 1748)
- September 29 – Jacques-Martin Hotteterre, composer (died 1763)
- November 23 – Pierre Dumage, organist and composer (died 1751)
- date unknown – Ambrose Philips, poet and lyricist (died 1749)
- probable – Jeremiah Clarke, composer (suicide 1707)

== Deaths ==
- January 12 – Giacomo Carissimi, composer (born 1605)
- February 22 – John Wilson, theatre composer (born 1595)
- February 24 – Matthias Weckmann, composer (born c.1616)
- July 14 – Pelham Humfrey, English composer and singer (born 1647)
- October 15 – Robert Herrick, poet and lyricist (born 1591)
- October 27 – Hallgrímur Pétursson, hymnist (born 1614)
- November 8 – John Milton, poet and lyricist (born 1608)
- date unknown
  - Francisco Lopez Capillas, composer and chapelmaster of Mexico Cathedral (born 1608)
