= 1676 in music =

List of years in music	(table)
- … 1666; 1667; 1668; 1669; 1670; 1671; 1672; 1673; 1674; 1675; 1676; 1677; 1678; 1679; 1680; 1681; 1682; 1683; 1684; 1685; 1686 …
- Art; Archaeology; Architecture; Literature; Music; Philosophy; Science; +...

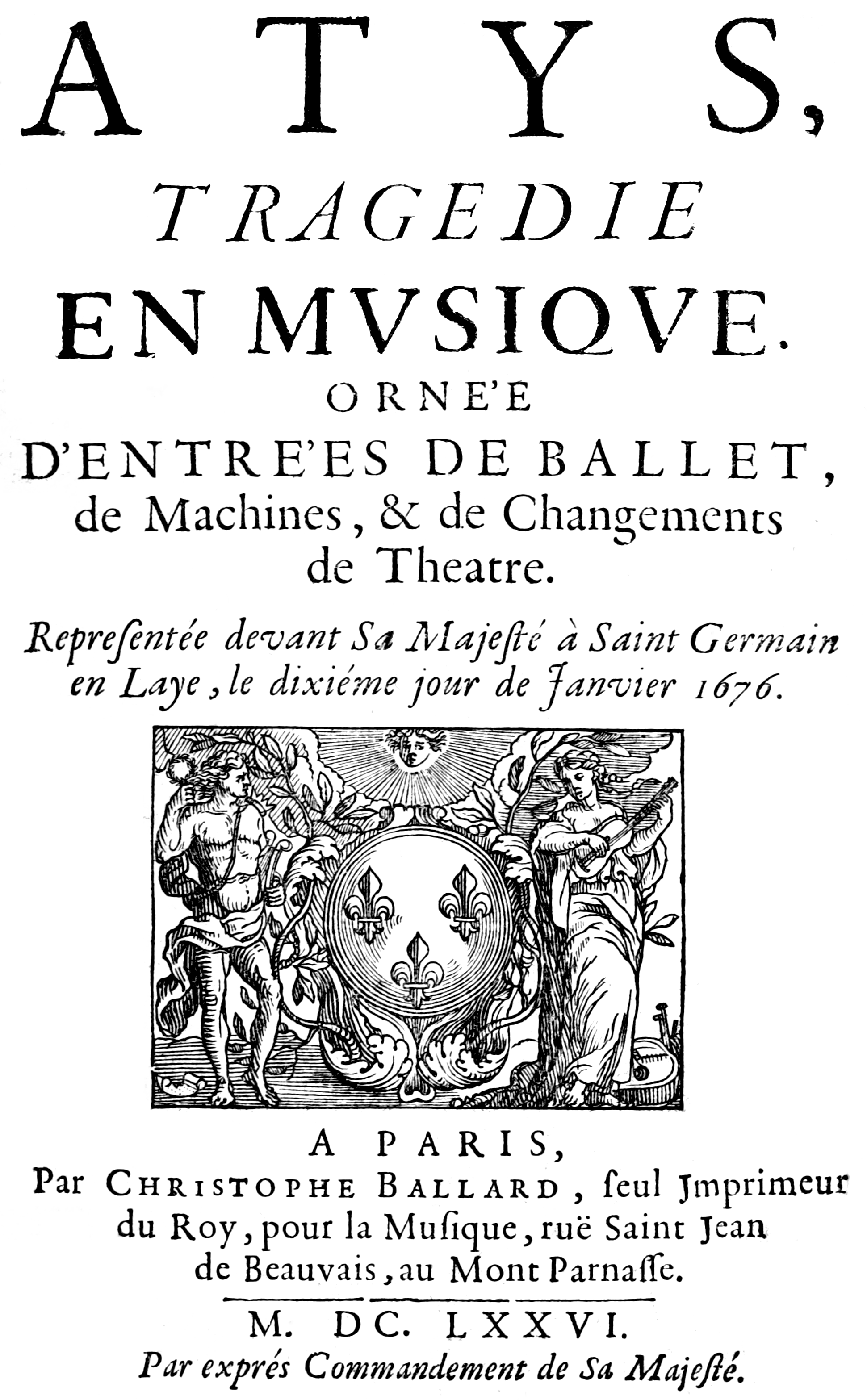

The year 1676 in music involved some significant events.

== Events ==
- Construction of the Teatro San Angelo in Venice is completed.
- Giuseppe Ottavio Pitoni arrives in Rieti.

== Publications ==
- Thomas Mace – Musick's Monument

== Classical music ==
- Johann Jakob Walther – Scherzi da Violino solo con il basso continuo
- Isabella Leonarda – Motetti a voce sola, Op.6
- Johann Christoph Bach – Meine Freundin, du bist schön
- Dietrich Buxtehude – Jesu dulcis memoria, BuxWV 56
- Nicola Matteis – Ayres for the Violin, Books 1 and 2 (Containing Diverse bizzarie sopra la vecchia sarabanda o pur ciaccona)
- Giovanni Legrenzi – Cantate e canzonette, Op.12
- Johann Caspar Kerll
  - Canzona in C major
  - Ciacona in C major
- Marc-Antoine Charpentier – Circé, H.496
- Nicolas Lebègue – Livre d'orgue No.1
- Esaias Reusner – Neue Lauten-Früchte
- Alessandro Stradella – S. Giovanni Battista, G.3.3
- Heinrich Biber – Sonatae tam aris quam aulis servientes
- Johann Philipp Krieger – Passacaglia in D minor
- Giovanni Battista Bassani – La Tromba della Divina misericordia

== Opera ==
- Jean-Baptiste Lully
  - Atys
  - Isis
- Antonio Sartorio – Giulio Cesare in Egitto

== Births ==
- January 19 – John Weldon, musician (died 1736)
- February 4 – Giacomo Facco, violinist, conductor and composer (died 1753)
- April 4 – Giuseppe Maria Orlandini, opera composer (died 1760)
- May 23 – Johann Bernhard Bach, composer, cousin of Johann Sebastian Bach (died 1749)

== Deaths ==
- January 14 – Francesco Cavalli, Italian composer (born 1602)
- June 7 – Paul Gerhardt, Germany's best-known hymn-writer (born 1606)
- October 6 – Claudia Rusca, singer, composer and organist (born 1593)
- October 10 – Sebastian Knüpfer, composer (born 1633)
