= 1673 in music =

List of years in music	(table)
- … 1663; 1664; 1665; 1666; 1667; 1668; 1669; 1670; 1671; 1672; 1673; 1674; 1675; 1676; 1677; 1678; 1679; 1680; 1681; 1682; 1683 …
- Art; Archaeology; Architecture; Literature; Music; Philosophy; Science; +...

The year 1673 in music involved some significant events.

== Events ==
- John Blow becomes organist of Westminster Abbey.
- Agostino Steffani begins his studies in Rome under Ercole Bernabei.
- Johann Michael Bach becomes organist and town clerk of Gehren.
- Robert Cambert arrives in Britain.
- Giovanni Maria Bononcini publishes his treatise, Musico prattico.
- Henry Purcell is apprenticed to the organist John Hingeston.

== Publications ==
- Giovanni Maria Bononcini – Musico prattico, Op.8
- Erasmus Gruber – Synopsis musica
- Matthew Locke – The Present Practice of Musick

== Classical music ==
- Giovanni-Battista Agneletti – Gloria patri et filio et spiritui sancto
- Heinrich Ignaz Franz Biber - Battalia à 10
- Cristofaro Caresana – La Tarentella
- Marc-Antoine Charpentier
  - Ouverture et intermèdes, H.494
  - Symphonie devant Regina, H.509
  - Prélude, H.510
  - Prélude, H.512
- Agostino Guerrieri – 13 Sonatas, Op. 1
- Sebastien Knüpfer – Erforsche mich, Gott (May 14)
- Giovanni Legrenzi
  - Violin Duo and continuo
  - La Cetra (Op. 10), a collection of sonatas
- Matthew Locke – Melothesia
- Jean-Baptiste Lully – La pastorale comique, LWV 33

== Opera ==
- Wolfgang Carl Briegel – Das verliebte Gespenst
- Jean-Baptiste Lully
  - Cadmus et Hermione
  - Alceste
- Antonio Sartorio – Orfeo
- Pietro Andrea Ziani – Marcello in Siracuse
- Matthew Locke – Psyche

== Births ==
- January 30 – Marc-Antoine Legrand, lyricist (died 1728)
- February 1 – Alessandro Marcello, composer (d. 1747)
- April 16 – Francesco Feroci, composer (d. 1750)
- June 18 – Antonio de Literes, composer of zarzuelas (died 1747)
- July 25 – Santiago de Murcia, guitarist and composer (died 1739)
- August 28 – Conrad Michael Schneider, composer (died 1752)
- September 29 – Jacques Hotteterre, composer (d. 1763)
- October 26 – Dimitrie Cantemir, composer, musicologist and polymath (d. 1723)
- date unknown – Johannes Kelpius, the first Pennsylvanian composer (died 1708)

== Deaths ==
- February 2 – Kaspar Förster, composer and musician (born by 1616)
- February 17 – Molière, opera librettist (born 1622)
- date unknown – Lemme Rossi, music theorist
