= 1668 in music =

List of years in music	(table)
- … 1658; 1659; 1660; 1661; 1662; 1663; 1664; 1665; 1666; 1667; 1668; 1669; 1670; 1671; 1672; 1673; 1674; 1675; 1676; 1677; 1678 …
- Art; Archaeology; Architecture; Literature; Music; Philosophy; Science; +...

The year 1668 in music involved some significant events.

== Events ==
- Dietrich Buxtehude becomes organist at the Marienkirche in Lübeck.
- Joseph Haines joins the troupe of performers at Hatton Garden, London.
- Antonio Draghi is appointed to the court of Leopold I, Holy Roman Emperor, at Vienna.

== Publications ==
- Dietrich Becker – Musikalische Frühlings-Früchte
- Richard Duckworth's Tintinnalogia, or, the Art of Ringing, the first work on change ringing, is compiled and published complete by Fabian Stedman in London.
- Thomas Tomkins' Musica Deo Sacra is published posthumously by his son, Nathaniel.
- Gaspar de Verlit – Missae et motettae nec non quator antiphonae B. Mariae Virginis, vol. 2

== Classical music ==
- Christoph Bernhard -- Ach mein herzliebes Jesulein (and other portions of Geistlicher Harmonien Erster Teil)
- Heinrich Ignaz Franz von Biber -- Sonata à 7
- Dietrich Buxtehude -- All solch dein Güt wir preisen, BuxWV 3
- Francesco Cavalli -- O bone Jesu
- Maurizio Cazzati – Canzonette a voce sola, libro 5, Op.46
- Henry DuMont -- Motets à deux voix, avec la basse-continue
- Lambert Pietkin -- Sacri concentus, Op. 3
- Johann Schmelzer - Harmonia à 5

== Opera ==
- Antonio Cesti – Il pomo d'oro (premiered July 12 or 14 in Vienna)
- Antonio Draghi – Achille riconsciuto
- Jacopo Melani – Il Girello
- Jean-Baptist Lully
  - Le carnaval, LWV 36
  - George Dandin
  - La Grotte de Versailles
- Francesco Feo -- Andromaca

== Births ==
- January 8 – Jean Gilles, composer (died 1705)
- June 19 – Georg von Bertouch, composer (died 1743)
- September 13 – Luca Antonio Predieri, composer (died 1767)
- October 29 – Joseph-François Duché de Vancy, librettist (died 1704)
- November 10 – François Couperin, French organist and composer (died 1733)
- November 27 – Pantaleon Hebenstreit, German dance teacher, musician, composer and inventor of the pantalon (died 1750)
- December 11 – Apostolo Zeno, Venetian librettist (died 1750)
- date unknown – John Eccles, English composer (died 1735)

== Deaths ==
- March 7 – Odoardo Ceccarelli, Italian singer and composer (born c. 1600)
- April 7 – Sir William Davenant, English poet and playwright, author of The Siege of Rhodes, considered the first opera in English (born 1606)
- October 23 – Giovanni Rovetta, Venetian composer (born 1596)
- August 9 – Jacob Balde, German New Latin poet and lyricist (born 1604)
- December 2 – Albertus Bryne, English composer and organist (born 1621)
- date unknown
  - Nicolas Métru, French organist, violist, and composer (born 1610)
  - Francesco Sbarra, dramatist, poet, and librettist (born 1611)
