= 1663 in music =

List of years in music	(table)
- … 1653; 1654; 1655; 1656; 1657; 1658; 1659; 1660; 1661; 1662; 1663; 1664; 1665; 1666; 1667; 1668; 1669; 1670; 1671; 1672; 1673 …
- Art; Archaeology; Architecture; Literature; Music; Philosophy; Science; +...

The year 1663 in music.

== Opera ==
- Antonio Cesti – La Dori Venice premiere
- Kaspar Förster – Der lobwürdige Cadmus

== Music ==
- Johann Rudolf Ahle
  - Ach Herr, mich armen Sünder
  - Neugepflantzten Thüringischen Lustgarten
- Giovanni Arrigoni—Salmi, Op. 9
- Andreas Hammerschmidt—16 Masses
- Bonifazio Graziani—Responsoria hebdomadæ sanctæ, Op.9
- Giovanni Legrenzi – Sonate a due, tre, cinque, a sei stromenti. Libro 3. Op. 8
- Jean-Baptiste Lully—Les noces de Village, LWV 19
- John Playford -- Musick's Hand-maid
- Johann Adam Reincken – An Wasserflüssen Babylon

== Births ==
- March 7 – Tomaso Antonio Vitali, violinist and composer (died 1745)
- March 16 – Jean-Baptiste Matho, composer (died 1743)
- July 1 – Franz Xaver Murschhauser, German composer and music theorist (died 1738)
- September 25 – Johann Nikolaus Hanff, composer (died 1711)
- November 14 – Friedrich Wilhelm Zachow, composer, teacher of Handel (died 1712)
- date unknown
  - Andrea Adami da Bolsena, papal choirmaster (died 1742)
  - Nicolas Siret, organist, harpsichordist and composer (died 1754)
  - Johann Joseph Vilsmayr, composer (died 1722)

== Deaths ==
- March 20 – Biagio Marini, violinist and composer (born 1594)
- July 2 – Thomas Selle, composer (born 1599)
- July 24 – Thomas Baltzar, violinist (born c.1631)
- December 5 – Severo Bonini, composer (born 1582)
- date unknown
  - Antoine de Beaulieu, ballet dancer
  - Nicolas Hotman, composer (born c.1610)
  - Heinrich Scheidemann, organist and composer (born c.1595)
