= 1660 in music =

List of years in music	(table)
- … 1650; 1651; 1652; 1653; 1654; 1655; 1656; 1657; 1658; 1659; 1660; 1661; 1662; 1663; 1664; 1665; 1666; 1667; 1668; 1669; 1670 …
- Art; Archaeology; Architecture; Literature; Music; Philosophy; Science; +...

The year 1660 in music involved some significant events.

== Events ==
- Dieterich Buxtehude becomes organist at Helsingør in Denmark.
- Pelham Humphrey and John Blow become members of the Chapel Royal.

== Publications ==
- Johann Crüger – Musicae Practicae
- Nicolas Fleury – Methode pour apprendre facilement a toucher le theorbe sur la basse-continuë
- Tommaso Marchetti – Intavolatura della chitarra spagnola

== Classical music ==
- Johann Rudolf Ahle – Erstes Zehn Neuer Geistlicher Arien
- Christoph Bernhard – Fürchtet euch nicht
- Samuel Capricornus – Jubilus Bernhardi
- Maurizio Cazzati – Trattenimenti per camera, Op.22
- Giovanni Legrenzi – Sentimenti devoti, Op.6
- Matthew Locke – Consort of Four Parts
- Giovanni Antonio Pandolfi Mealli (1624-1687)
  - Sonate a violino solo, per chiesa e camera, Op. 3 (Innsbruck: Michael Wagner)
  - Sonate a violino solo, per chiesa e camera, Op. 4 (Innsbruck: Michael Wagner)
- Marco Uccellini
  - Ozio Regio, Op.7
  - Sinfonie Boscarecie, Op. 8
- Bauyn Manuscript

== Opera ==
- Antonio Bertali – La magia delusa
- Francesco Cavalli – Xerxès
- Juan Hidalgo de Polanco – Celos aun del aire matan
- Francesco Manelli – La filo
- Francesco Rossi – L'Arianna
- Giuseppe Tricarico – L'Oronie
- Filippo Vismarri – L'Orontea
- Pietro Andrea Ziani – L'Antigona delusa da Alceste

== Births ==
- April 6 – Johann Kuhnau, organist and composer (died 1722)
- April 19 – Sebastián Durón, composer of stage music (died 1716)
- May 2 – Alessandro Scarlatti, Italian composer (died 1725)
- August 20 – Mathieu Lanes, composer and harpsichordist (died 1725)
- December 4 (baptized) – André Campra, French composer (died 1744)
- date unknown
  - Rosa Giacinta Badalla, Italian composer and nun (died c. 1710)
  - Johann Joseph Fux, composer (died 1741)

== Deaths ==
- March 2 (buried) – Friederich Stellwagen, organ builder (born 1603)
- date unknown
  - Johann Klemm, German organist and composer (born c.1593)
  - Johannes Praetorius, organist and composer (born 1595)
