= 1664 in music =

List of years in music	(table)
- … 1654; 1655; 1656; 1657; 1658; 1659; 1660; 1661; 1662; 1663; 1664; 1665; 1666; 1667; 1668; 1669; 1670; 1671; 1672; 1673; 1674 …
- Art; Archaeology; Architecture; Literature; Music; Philosophy; Science; +...

The year 1664 in music involved some significant events.

== Events ==
- Following the disgrace of Jacques Champion de Chambonnières, Jean-Henri d'Anglebert assumes the position of harpsichordist to Louis XIV, King of France.
- Anthoni van Noordt becomes organist at the Nieuwe Kerk

== Classical music ==
- Giovanni Legrenzi – 16 Sonatas, Op.8
- Heinrich Schütz – Weihnachts-Oratorium (Christmas Oratorio)
- Bernardo Storace – Selva di varie compositioni
- Johann Heinrich Schmelzer – Sonatae unarum fidium, seu a violino solo
- Barbara Strozzi – Arie, Op. 8

== Opera ==
- Antonio Maria Abbatini – Ione
- Antonio Bertali – Pazzo amor

== Births ==
- January 17 – Antonio Salvi, Italian physician, court poet and librettist (died 1724)
- February 23 – Georg Dietrich Leyding, organist and composer (died 1710)
- March – Georg Österreich, composer (died 1735)
- March 14 – Silvio Stampiglia, librettist (died 1725)
- June 28 – Nicolas Bernier, composer (died 1734)
- August 6 – Johann Christoph Schmidt, composer (d. 1728)
- September 9 – Johann Christoph Pez, composer (died 1716)
- November 9 – Johann Speth, organist and composer (died c. 1720)
- date unknown – Daniel Purcell, composer (died 1717)

== Deaths ==
- January 1 – Charles Racquet, organist (born c. 1598)
- July 16 – Andreas Gryphius, librettist and playwright (born 1616)
- date unknown – Juan Gutiérrez de Padilla, composer (born c.1590)
