= 1756 in music =

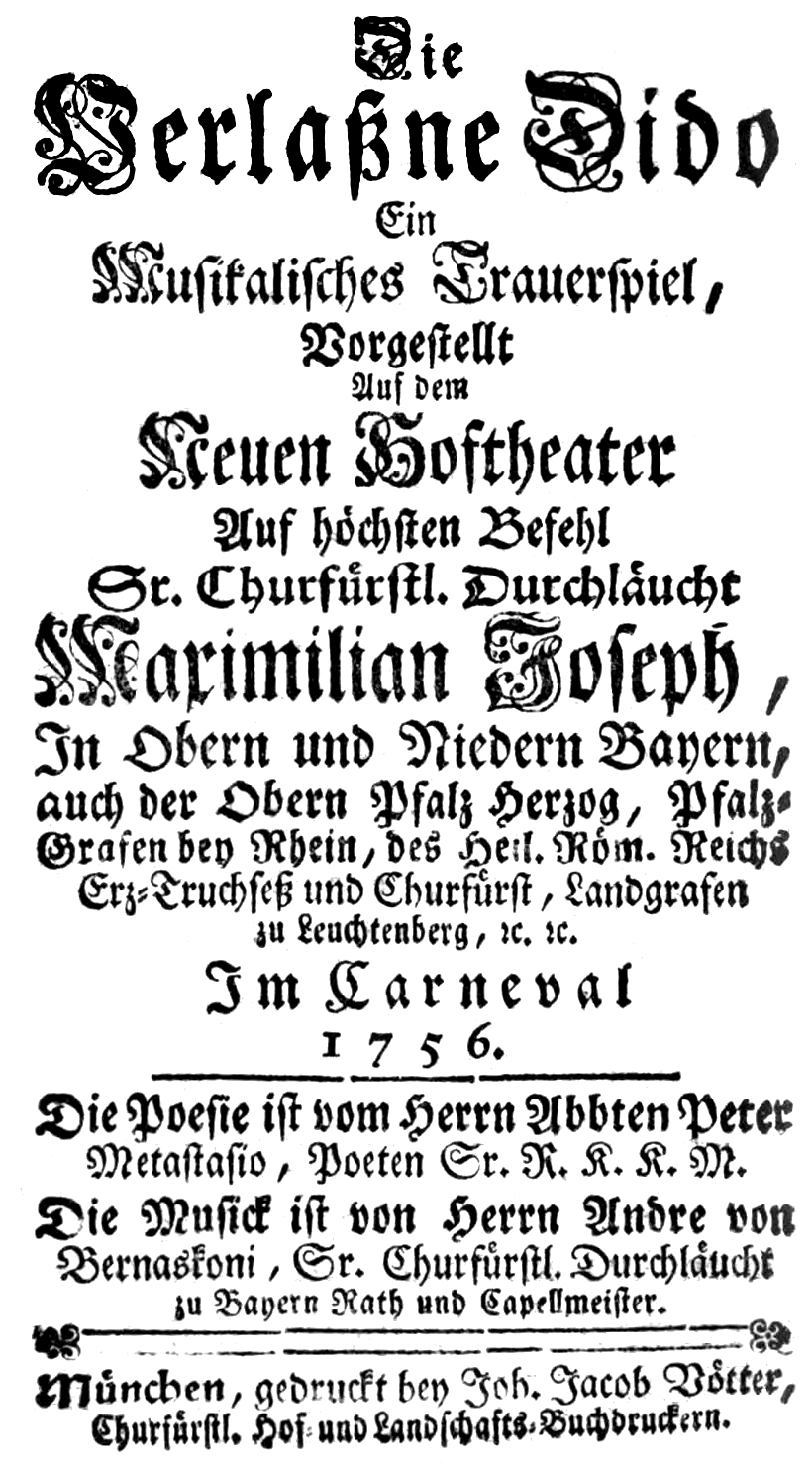
Andrea Bernasconi - Didone abbandonata - german titlepage of the libretto - Munich 1756

== Events ==
- Christoph Willibald Gluck is knighted by Pope Benedict XIV
- Johann Christian Bach settles in Italy.

== Published Popular Music ==
- Mme Papavoine – Vous fuyez sans vouloir m'entendre (Paris)

== Classical music ==
- Johann Friedrich Agricola – 6 Canzonette
- Carl Philipp Emanuel Bach
  - La Bergius, H.90
  - La Borchward, H.79
  - La Gleim, H.89
  - La Pott, H.80
  - La Prinzette, H.91
- Anna Bon – 6 Flute Sonatas, Op. 1
- Michel Corrette
  - Troisième Livre d’Orgue
  - 6 Organ Concertos, Op. 26
- Baldassare Galuppi – 6 Harpsichord Sonatas, Op. 1
- Joseph Haydn – Keyboard Concerto No. 1 in C, Hob. XVIII/1
- Marianus Königsperger – Præambulum cum fuga octavi toni
- Julien-Amable Mathieu – 6 Trios, Op. 2
- Leopold Mozart – Sinfonia di caccia
- Giuseppe Antonio Paganelli - Ariae pro organo et cembalo
- Giuseppe Sammartini – 8 Overtures in 7 Parts, Op. 10
- Elizabeth Turner – A Collection of Songs

== Opera ==
- Pasquale Cafaro – La disfatta di Dario
- Baldassare Galuppi – Idomeneo
- Pierre van Maldere – Le Déguisement pastorale
- Jean-Philippe Rameau – Zoroastre
- Antonio Sacchini – Fra Donato
- John Christopher Smith – The Tempest

== Publications ==
- Johann Friedrich Daube – General-Bass in drey Accorden
- Jacob Wilhelm Lustig – Samenspraaken over muzikaale Beginselen
- Leopold Mozart – Versuch einer gründlichen Violinschule ("A Treatise on the Fundamental Principles of Violin Playing")
- Jean-Philippe Rameau – Suite des Erreurs sur la musique dans l'Encyclopédie

== Births ==
- January 27 – Wolfgang Amadeus Mozart, Austrian composer (died 1791)
- February 9 - Karel Blažej Kopřiva, Czech composer (died 1785)
- March 21 – Augustus Frederic Christopher Kollmann, German composer (died 1829)
- March 24 – Franziska Lebrun, composer and vocalist (died 1791)
- May 7 – Thomas Linley the younger, English composer (died 1778)
- June 20 – Joseph Martin Kraus, German-born composer (died 1792)
- September 8 – Anton Teyber, composer and organist (died 1822)
- September 27 – Christoffer Christian Karsten, Swedish operatic tenor (died 1827)
- December 30 – Paul Wranitzky, Moravian-Austrian composer (died 1808)
- date unknown
  - Antoine Lacroix, French composer and violinist (died 1806)
  - Joséphine-Rosalie de Walckiers, Dutch-Austrian composer (died 1836)

== Deaths ==
- January 25 – Christian Vater, German organ and harpsichord builder (born 1679)
- April 10 – Giacomo Antonio Perti, Bolognese composer (born 1661)
- April 13 – Johann Gottlieb Goldberg, German keyboard virtuoso (born 1727)
- August 18 – Erdmann Neumeister, German hymnologist (born 1671)
- September 19 – Josef Antonín Sehling, Bohemian composer (born 1710)
- date unknown – Riccardo Broschi, Italian-born composer (born c. 1698)
