= Hanff =

Hanff is a surname. Notable people with the surname include:

- Helene Hanff (1916–1997), American writer
- Jean Hanff Korelitz (born 1961), American novelist, playwright, theater producer and essayist
- Johann Nikolaus Hanff (1663–1711), German classical organist and composer

== See also ==
- 7902 Hanff, main-belt asteroid
