= 1684 in music =

The year 1684 in music involved some significant events.

== Events ==
- Antonio Stradivari makes the Bucher, Cipriani Potter and Cobbett ex Holloway violins.
- An adaptation of Fletcher's Valentinian features music composed by Louis Grabu.

== Classical music ==
- Giovanni Battista Bassani – Affetti canori, cantate et ariette, Op.6
- Dietrich Buxtehude
  - Dein edles Herz, der Liebe Thron, BuxWV 14
  - Herr auf dich traue ich, BuxWV 35
  - Herr nun läßt du deinen Diener, BuxWV 37
  - Lobe den Herrn meine Seele, BuxWV 71
- Marc-Antoine Charpentier
  - Litanies de la Vierge, H.83
  - Pro omnibus festis B V M, H.333
  - In nativitatem Domini canticum, H.414
  - Sur la naissance de notre Seigneur Jésus Christ, H.482
  - Pastorale sur la Naissance de Notre Seigneur Jesus Christ, H.483
- Michel Richard de Lalande – Te Deum S.32
- Domenico Gabrielli – Balletti, Op.1
- Giovanni Battista Granata – Armoniosi toni di varie suonate musicali per la chitarra spagnuola . . . Opera settima
- Johann Krieger – Ich will in Friede fahren
- Isabella Leonarda – Mottetti a voce sola, Op.11
- Jean-Baptiste Lully
  - Plaude laetare galia, LWV 37
  - Te Deum, LWV 55
  - De Profundis, LWV 62
- John Playford – The Division Violin
- Henry Purcell – From those serene and rapturous joys, Z.326
- Pierre Robert – Motets pour la Chapelle du Roy
- Alessandro Scarlatti – Agar et Ismaele esiliati (oratorio)
- Giovanni Battista Vitali
  - Sinfonia a 6
  - Sonate da Chiesa à due Violini, Op.9
  - Varie Sonate alla Francese, & all'Itagliana à sei Stromenti, Op.11

== Opera ==
- John Blow – Venus and Adonis
- Juan Hidalgo de Polanco – Apolo y Leucotea
- Jean-Baptiste Lully – Amadis de Gaule

== Births ==
- March 15 – Francesco Durante, composer (died 1755)
- June 22 – Francesco Manfredini, violinist and composer (died 1762)
- September 18 – Johann Gottfried Walther, composer and music theorist (died 1748)
- September 23 – Johann Theodor Römhild, composer (died 1756)
- October 30 – Maria Barbara Bach, first wife of J.S. Bach (died 1720)
- date unknown
  - François d' Agincour, composer (died 1758)
  - Georg Christian Lehms, librettist (died 1717)

== Deaths ==
- April 12 – Nicola Amati, violin-maker of Cremona (born 1596)
- May 8 – Henri Dumont, Netherlandish composer (born 1610)
- July 5 – Johann Hildebrand, composer (born 1614)
- September 10 – Johann Rosenmüller, German composer (born 1619)
- October 1 – Pierre Corneille, French librettist (born 1606)
