= Rosa Giacinta Badalla =

Italian composer and Benedictine nun

Rosa Giacinta Badalla (ca. 1660 – ca. 1710) was an Italian composer from the Milan area and Benedictine nun. She was at the convent of Saint Radegonda in Milan from 1678. Badalla had only one printed collection, Motetti a voce sola (1684, Venice), a book of solo motets. Kendrick identifies it as "remarkable among Milanese solo motet books…for its patent vocal viruosity, motivic originality and self-assured compositional technique". There are also two surviving secular cantatas, Vuò cercando (ca. 1680) and O fronde care (ca 1695), to which Badalla also wrote the text.

== Life ==
Rosa Giacinta Badalla was born ca. 1660. was an Italian composer from the Milan area, possibly Bergamo, and Benedictine nun. The first record of her is in the lists of the monastery of Saint Radegonda in Milan from 1678. Claudia Sessa, Claudia Rusca, and Chiara Margarita Cozzolani were also active at Milanese convents during the same period. The convent was renowned for its musical prowess, especially the nuns' singing on feast days.

Badalla had only one printed collection, Motetti a voce sola (1684, Venice), a book of solo motets. Kendrick identifies it as "remarkable among Milanese solo motet books…for its patent vocal virtuosity, motivic originality and self-assured compositional technique". In her preface to the motets, Badalla "noted her youth and inexperience".

There are also two surviving secular cantatas by Badalla, Vuò cercando (ca. 1680) and O fronde care (ca 1695), to which Badalla also wrote the text.

Badalla is believed to have died at the convent in Milan circa 1710.
