= Bonifazio Graziani =

Italian composer

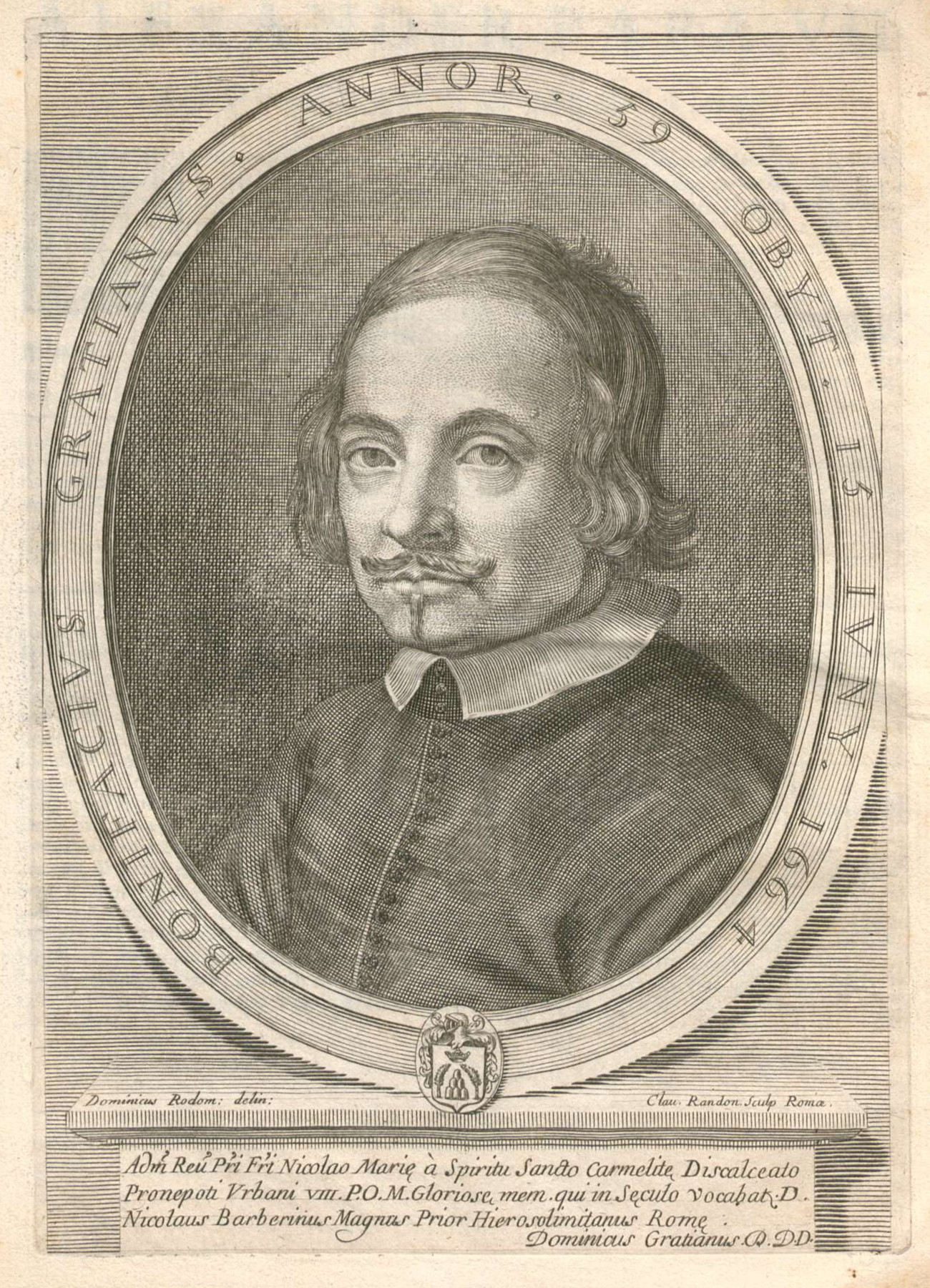
Bonifazio Graziani

Bonifazio Graziani (1604/05 in Marino near Rome – 15 June 1664, in Rome) was an Italian organist, composer and clergyman in the Baroque period.

== Works ==
Published in print:

- Motetti a due, tre, quattro, cinque, e sei voci (Op. 1), Rom Vitale Mascardi, 1650
- Il secondo libro de motetti a due, tre, quattro, cinque e sei voci(Op. 2), Rom Vitale Mascardi, 1652
- Il primo libro de motetti a voce sola (Op. 3), Roma, Vitale Mascardi 1652; weitere Auflagen bei Maurizio Balmonti 1655, Ignazio de Lazzari 1661
- Psalmi vespertini quinque vocibus cum organo, et sine organo decantandi... lib. I, opus quartum (Op. 4), Rom Nicolo Germani/Vitale Mascardi 1652
- Psalmi vespertini quinque vocibus concinendi, opus quintum (Op. 5), Rom Vitale Mascardi, 1653
- Il secondo libro de motetti a voce sola. opera sesta (Op. 6), Rom Maurizio Balmonti, 1655
- Motetti a due, tre, e cinque voci... libro terzo, opera settima (Op. 7), Rom Maurizio Balmonti, 1656
- Il terzo libro de motetti a voce sola... opera ottava (Op. 8), Rom Giacomo Fei, 1658
- Responsoria hebdomadae sanctae, quatuor vocibus concinenda, una cum organo si placet (Op. 9), Rom Ignazio de Lazari, 1663
- Del quarto libro de motetti a voce sola... opera decima (Op. 10), Rom Giacomo Fei, 1665
- Litanie della Madonna a quattro, cinque, sette e otto voci... opera undecima (Op. 11), Rom Giacomo Fei, 1665
- Motetti a due, tre, quattro, e cinque voci per ogni tempo ... opera XII (Op. 12), Rom, Mascardi Heirs, 1673
- Antifone della Beatissima Vergine Maria, solite ricitarsi tutto l'anno doppo l'offizio divino... a quattro, cinque e sei voci... opera decima terza (Op. 13), Rom Giacomo Fei, 1665
- Antifone per diverse festività di tutto l'anno, a due, tre, e quattro voci... parte prima, opera decima quarta (Op. 14), Rom Ignazio de Lazari 1666
- Sacri concerti... a due, tre, quattro e cinque voci... opera decimaquinta (Op. 15), Rom Amadeo Belmonte 1668
- Partitura del quinto libro de'motetti a voce sola... opera XVI (Op. 16), Rom Amadeo Belmonte 1669
- Psalmi vespertini binis choris, una cum organo certatim, suaviterque decantandi... opus XVII (Op. 17), Rom Amadeo Belmonte, 1670
- Il primo libro delle messe a quattro, e cinque... opera decima ottava (Op. 18), Rom Angelo Mutii 1671
- Sacrae cantiones una tantum voce cum organo decantandae... liber sextus, opus XIX (Op. 19), Rom Mascardi Heirs 1672
- Motetti a due, tre, quattro, e cinque voci... lib. VI, opera XX (Op. 20), Rom, Mascardi Heirs 1672
- Hinni vespertini per tutte le principali festività dell'anno, composti in musica a tre, quattro, e cinque voci, alcuni con li ripieni... opera XXI (Op. 21), Rom Mascardi Heirs 1673
- Il secondo libro delle messe a quattro, cinque, e otto voci... opera XXII (Op. 22), Rom Mascardi Heirs 1674
- Motetti a due, tre e quattro voci... opera XXIII (Op. 23), Rom Mascardi Heirs 1674
- Motetti a due, tre, quattro e cinque voci... opera XXIV (Op. 24), Rom Mascardi 1676
- Musiche sagre, e morali composte ad'una, due, tre, e quattro voci... opera XXV (Op. 25), Rom Mascardi Heirs 1678
- Motetti a due, e tre voci (ohne Opuszahl), Rom Giacomo Fei 1667

== Literature ==
- Susanne Shigihara: Bonifazio Graziani (1604/05–1664). Biographie, Werkverzeichnis und Untersuchungen zu den Solomotetten. Bonn 1984 (Dissertation)
