= 1680 in music =

The year 1680 in music involved some significant events.

== Events ==
- Arcangelo Corelli begins his friendship with Cristiano Farinelli.
- Antonio Stradivari sets up his own business in Cremona.
- John Blow is forced out of his job as organist at Westminster Abbey, to make room for Henry Purcell.
- Georg Muffat goes to Italy to study organ with Bernardo Pasquini.
- Johann Philipp Krieger becomes Kapellmeister of the court at Weissenfels.
- First record of the marimba in Guatemala.

== Publications ==
- Denis Gaultier – Livres de tablature des pièces de luth
- Ennemond Gaultier
  - Livre de musique pour le luth contenant une métode
  - Pièces de luth en musique avec des règles pour les toucher parfaitement sur le luth, et sur le clavessin

== Classical music ==
- Heinrich Biber – Mensa sonora
- Dieterich Buxtehude – Membra Jesu Nostri
- Marc-Antoine Charpentier
  - Filius prodigus
  - Leçon de ténèbres du Vendredi saint, H.105
  - Laudate pueri Dominum, H.203
  - Concert pour 4 parties de violes, H.545
- Ennemond Gaultier – Suite in D minor
- Johann Caspar Horn – Geistliche Harmonien
- Charles Mouton – Pièces de luth sur différents modes
- Henry Purcell
  - Beati omnes qui timent Dominum, Z.131
  - Fantasias and In Nomines, Z.732-747
  - Pavane and Chaconne in G minor, Z.752 (Pavane) and Z.730 (Chaconne)
  - 12 Sonatas of Three Parts, Z.790-801
- Sebastian Anton Scherer – 14 Sonatas, Op.3
- Johann Heinrich Schmelzer – Lamento sopra la morte di Ferdinand III (Published in the Rost Codex)
- Giovanni Battista Vitali – Partite sopra diverse sonate

== Opera ==
- Pietro Simone Agostini – Il ratto delle Sabine
- Jean-Baptiste Lully – Proserpine
- Antonio Sartorio – La Flora
- Alessandro Scarlatti – L'honestà negli amori

== Births ==
- April 19 – Johann Friedrich Helbig, hymnist (died 1722)
- May 6 – Jean-Baptiste Stuck, cellist and composer (died 1755)
- September 29 – Christian Friedrich Hunold, librettist (died 1721)
- November 18 (baptised) – Jean-Baptiste Loeillet, composer (died 1730)
- December 11 – Emanuele d'Astorga, composer (died 1736)
- date unknown
  - Louis de Caix d'Hervelois, composer (died 1759)
  - François Campion, guitarist and composer
  - Giovanni Antonio Guido, violinist and composer (died 1729)

== Deaths ==
- March 20 – Johann Heinrich Schmelzer, violinist (born 1623)
- April 1 – David Denicke, hymnist (b. 1603)
- May 31 – Joachim Neander, hymn-writer (b. 1650)
- September 10 – Baldassare Ferri, castrato singer (born 1610)
- October 13
  - Lelio Colista, composer and lutenist (b. 1629)
  - François Roberday, organist and composer (b. 1624)
- November 27 – Athanasius Kircher, composer and polymath (born 1602)
- December 10 – Marco Uccellini, violinist and composer
- December 30 – Antonio Sartorio, composer (born 1630)
- date unknown
  - Kancherla Gopanna, composer of Carnatic music (born c.1620)
  - Maria Francesca Nascinbeni, composer (born c.1640)
  - Francisco de Trillo y Figueroa, poet and lyricist (born 1618)
