= Pompeo Cannicciari =

Italian composer

Pompeo Cannicciari (1670 – 29 December 1744) was an Italian composer.

== Biography ==
Cannicciari was born in Rome, Papal States, and spent his entire life in the city. He was maestro di cappella from 1694 to 1709 at the Church of the Holy Spirit in Sassia. Cannicciari succeeded Alessandro Scarlatti as chapel master at the Basilica of Saint Mary Major (Santa Maria Maggiore) on 24 March 1709. He was a member of the Congregation of Saint Cecilia and was Guardian of the section of the chapel masters in 1698 and 1715 to 1718. He served in this office until his death. Cannicciari bequeathed his collection of music manuscripts to the Basilica. He was succeeded by his student, Sante Pesci, who had been a member of the choir. Pesci was directed to draw up an inventory of the entire music archive, thus providing historical documentation for the works of Cannicciari.

A composer of solely sacred music, Cannicciari was a representative of the Roman School of music and successor of the style of sacred polyphony of Horace benevolent. He was the author of numerous church works, including some pastoral masses, which occasionally have instrumental accompaniment for voices, but he preferred to devote himself to the production of masses and psalms and polyphony, demonstrating skill in counterpoint.

== Compositions ==
- 42 masses
- 146 graduals
- 120 offertories
- 266 antiphons
- 179 psalms
- 45 hymns
- 38 responses
- 56 motets
