= Johann Klemm =

German Baroque organist and composer (c.1593 - 1660)

Johann Klemm or Klemme (c. 1593–1660) was a German Baroque organist and composer.

Klemm was a pupil of Heinrich Schütz and organist at the Dresden court. As was normal for students to publish the works of their teachers, in 1647, together with Alexander Hering, he published Schütz's Symphoniae sacrae II.

== Works, editions, recordings ==
- German madrigals for four, five, and six voices (Freiburg, 1629)
- Partitura seu tabulatura italica, a collection of 36 fugues in open score (Dresden, 1631).
