= 1662 in music =

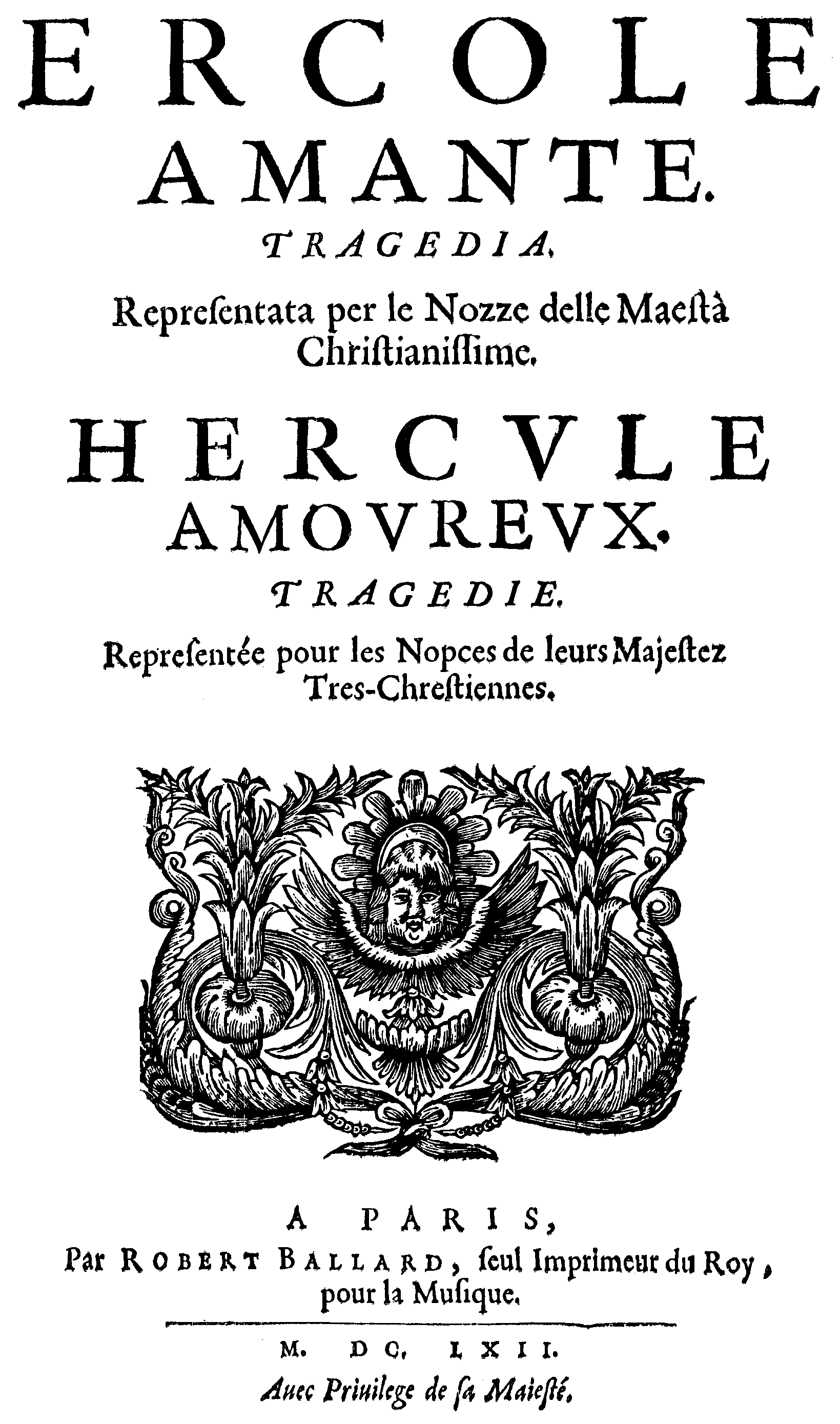
Francesco Cavalli's Ercole amante was publsiehd in Paris in 1662

The year 1662 in music involved some significant events.

== Events ==
- July 24 – Jean-Baptiste Lully marries Madeleine, daughter of French composer Michel Lambert.

== Publications ==
- Richard Dering – Cantica sacra for two and three voices with basso continuo (London: John Playford), published posthumously
- Jakob Ludwig – Partiturbuch Ludwig (with works by Bertali, Frohberger, etc.)
- Courtly Masquing Ayres (Works by Jenkins, Adson, etc.)

== Classical music ==
- Thomas Barcroft (or George Barcroft) – Service in G
- Philip Friederick Buchner – Plectrum musicum, Op.4
- Maurizio Cazzati – Correnti, e balletti, Op.30
- Andreas Hammerschmidt – Kirchen- und Tafel-Music
- Giovanni Legrenzi – Compiete con le lettanie & antifone, Op.7
- Johann Heinrich Schmelzer – Sacro-profanus concentus musicus (13 chamber sonatas)

== Opera ==
- Giovanni Andrea Bontempi – Il Paride
- Francesco Cavalli – Ercole amante (premiered Feb. 7 in Paris)

== Births ==
- February 5 – Giuseppe Vignola, Italian composer and musician (died 1712)
- August 28 – Angiola Teresa Moratori Scanabecchi, composer and painter (died 1708)
- August 28 – Maria Aurora von Königsmarck, noblewoman and composer (died 1728)
- December 17 – Samuel Wesley I, lyricist (died 1735)
- date unknown
  - Jean-Baptiste Drouart de Bousset, composer (died 1725)
  - Jean-Nicolas de Francine, director of the Opéra national de Paris (died 1735)
- probable – Giovanni Lorenzo Lulier, composer, cellist and trombone player (died 1700)

== Deaths ==
- January 26 – Marco Marazzoli, Italian composer of cantatas (born c.1602 or 1608)
- February – Giuseppe Zamponi, organist and composer (born c.1615)
- February 23 – Johann Crüger, composer (born 1598)
- April 23 – William Young, composer
- April 27 – Davis Mell, English violinist (born 1604)
- May 7 (or April 7)– Lucrezia Orsina Vizzana, singer, organist, and composer (born 1590)
- May 18 – Adam Billaut, French carpenter, poet and singer (born 1602)
- July 1 – Simon Ives, English organist and court composer (born 1600)
- July 7 – Andreas Düben, organist and composer (born c. 1597)
- September 7 – Marco Scacchi, composer and music writer (born c.1600)
- October 21 – Henry Lawes, composer (born 1595)
- date unknown
  - Galeazzo Sabbatini, composer and music theorist (born 1597)
