= Giovanni Martino Cesare =

Italian composer

Giovanni Martino Cesare (c. 1590 in Udine – 6 February 1667 in Munich) was a composer and cornett player.

By 1611 (when he had his first publication), he resided as cornett player at the house of Charles, Margrave of Burgau in Günzburg. In 1615, he became an employee of Duke Maximilian of Bavaria as a cornettist, where he wrote his best known collection, Musicali melodie (1621). It contains fourteen instrumental canzonas of one to six parts with basso continuo, and fourteen motets.
