= 1678 in music =

The year 1678 in music involved some significant events.

== Events ==
- January 2 – Public opera in Hamburg begins when the Oper am Gänsemarkt is inaugurated with a performance of Johann Theile's biblical Singspiel Adam und Eva.
- May 4 – André Campra begins ecclesiastical studies at the age of 17.
- June 19 – Guillaume-Gabriel Nivers is appointed to join Nicolas Lebègue, Jacques Thomelin and Jean Buterne as an organists of the Chapelle Royale at the French court.
- John Blow becomes a doctor of music.
- Seventeen-year-old Giacomo Antonio Perti composes his first opera.
- The Teatro Grimani is constructed, the grandest opera house in Venice.

== Classical music ==
- Albertus Bryne – 5 dance movements
- Henry Purcell – 3 Parts upon a Ground, Z.731
- Giovanni Buonaventura Viviani – Capricci armonici da chiesa e da camera, Op.4
- Bernardo Pasquini – Sant'Agnese
- Giovanni Paolo Colonna – Il transito di S. Giuseppe

== Opera ==
- Jean-Baptiste Lully
  - Psyche
  - Bellérophon, LWV 57
- Johann Theile – Der erschaffene, gefallene und aufgerichtete Mensch.
- Carlo Pallavicino – Il Vespasiano
- Giovanni Maria Bononcini – Astianatte
- La Despina, Agnelli, Milano 1678, performed in Milan.

== Births ==
- March 4 – Antonio Vivaldi, composer (died 1741)
- July 6 – Nicola Francesco Haym, opera librettist and composer (died 1727)
- December 30 – William Croft, organist and composer (died 1727)
- probable – Manuel de Zumaya, composer (died 1755)

== Deaths ==
- March – Jacques Hardel, harpsichordist and composer
- August 5 – Juan García de Zéspedes, composer (born 1619)
- September 20 – Antonio Masini, composer and conductor (born c. 1639)
- September 28 – Maurizio Cazzati, Italian composer (born 1616)
- November 18 – Giovanni Maria Bononcini, violinist and composer
- date unknown
  - Leonora Duarte, composer
  - John Jenkins, composer (born 1592)
- probable – Chiara Margarita Cozzolani, Benedictine nun and composer (born 1602)
