= 1659 in music =

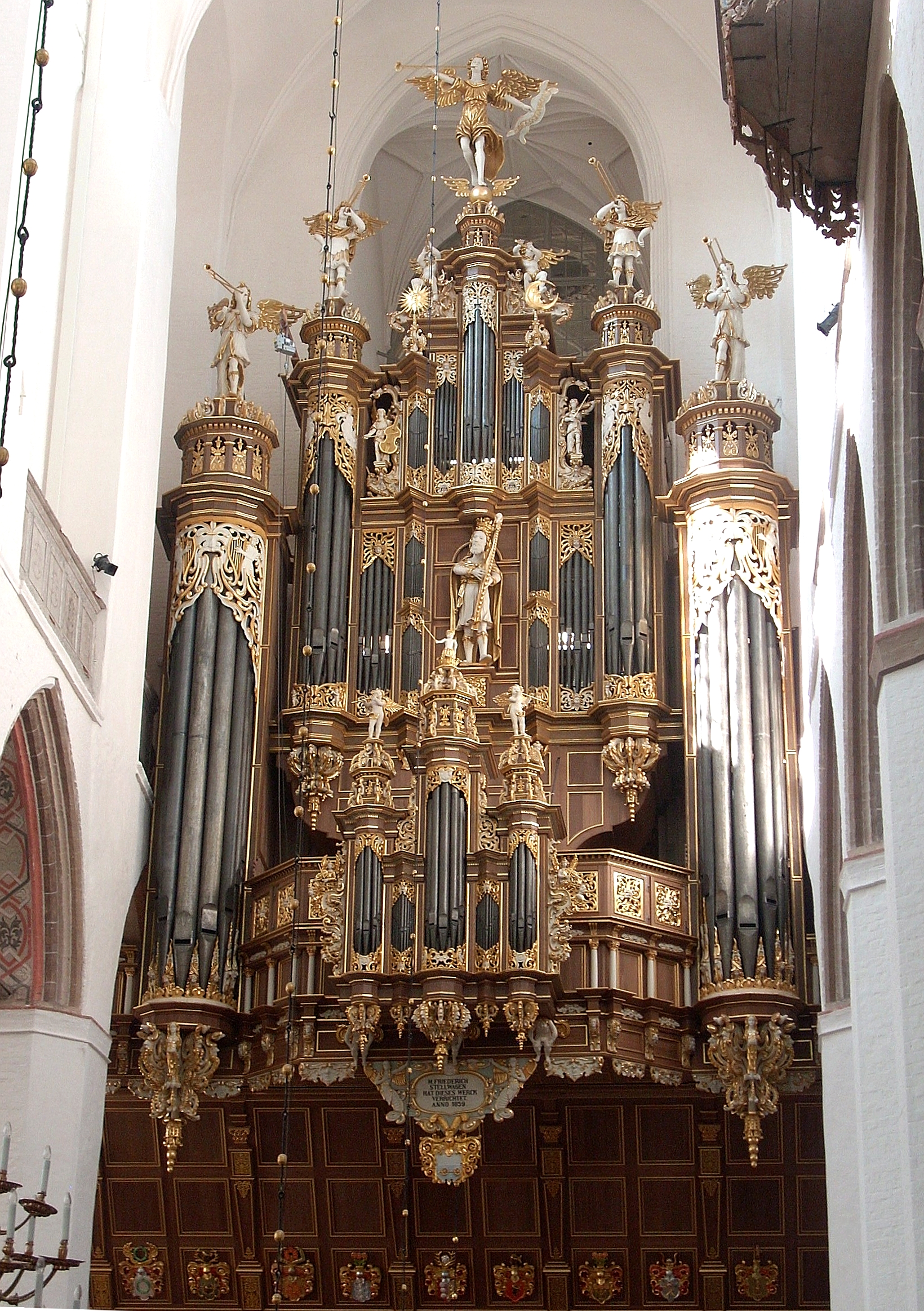

The year 1659 in music involved some significant events.

== Events ==
- Final printing of Parthenia, the first printed collection of music for keyboard in Britain.
- Fray García de San Francisco founds a Catholic mission in what is now El Paso, Texas, making him perhaps the first music teacher in the future United States.

== Publications ==
- Giovanni Battista Granata – Soavi concenti di sonate musicali per la chitarra spagnuola..., a collection of guitar music, published in Bologna
- Anthoni van Noordt – Tabulatuur-boeck van psalmen en fantasyen (Tablature-book of psalms and fantasies), a collection of organ music, published in Amsterdam
- Christopher Simpson – The Division Viol, a set of practical instructions, published in London
- Johann Heinrich Schmelzer – Duodena Selectarum Sonatarum

== Classical music ==
- Georg Arnold – Canzoni ariae et sonatae, Op.3
- Robert Cambert – Pastorale d'Issy (incidental music)
- Maurizio Cazzati – Trio Sonatas, Op.18
- Jean-Baptiste Lully
  - Ballet de la Raillerie, LWV 11
  - Ballet de Toulouse, LWV 13
- Barbara Strozzi – Diporti di Euterpe, Op.7

== Opera ==
- Antonio Bertali – Il rè Gelidoro
- Robert Cambert – Pastorale d'Issy

== Births ==
- January 17 – Antonio Veracini, violinist and composer
- March 6 – Salomo Franck, librettist for Bach Cantatas
- August 10 – Sybrandt van Noordt Jr., composer
- September 10 – Henry Purcell, composer
- October 22 – Georg Ernst Stahl, lyricist
- October 28 – Nicholas Brady, lyricist
- date unknown
  - Matteo Goffriller, cello maker
  - Francesco Antonio Pistocchi, composer

== Deaths ==
- April 15 – Simon Dach, hymn-writer (born 1605)
- September 27 – Andreas Tscherning, lyricist (born 1611)
- October 27 – Giovanni Francesco Busenello, opera librettist
- date unknown – Vinzenz Fux, composer (born c. 1606)
