= 1683 in music =

The following events in the field of music occurred in the year 1683.

== Events ==
- Henry Purcell becomes organ maker and keeper of the king's instruments at the Chapel Royal.
- Guillaume-Gabriel Nivers publishes his Dissertation sur le chant grégorien
- Thomas D’Urfey publishes New Collection of Songs and Poems
- Michel Richard Delalande appointed Chapel Master for Versailles by King Louis XIV

== Classical music ==
- Giovanni Battista Bassani – 12 sinfonie, Op. 5
- Heinrich Biber – Fidicinium sacro-profanum
- Dietrich Buxtehude
  - Canite Jesu nostro, BuxWV 11
  - Gott fähret auf mit Jauchzen, BuxWV 33
  - Ich bin die Auferstehung und das Leben, BuxWV 44
  - Ich halte es dafür, BuxWV 48
- Marc Antoine Charpentier
  - Pro omnibus festis B V M, H.333
  - Orphée descendant aux enfers, H.471
  - Ouverture pour l’église, H.524
- Michel Richard Delalande
  - Les fontaines de Versailles, S.133, premiered April 5 in Versailles
  - Concert d'Esculape, S.134, premiered in May in Versailles
  - De profundis, a grand motet, first performed in September, in the Saint Denis Basilica (burial site of French monarchs), for the repose of the soul of Queen Marie-Therèse
- Isabella Leonarda – 12 Sonatas, Op.16
- Johann Pachelbel – Musicalische Sterbens-Gedancken, which included:
  - Christus, der ist mein Leben, P.376
  - Alle Menschen müssen sterben, P.377a
  - Hertzlich tut mich verlangen, P.378
  - Was Gott thut, das ist wolgethan, P.379
  - Freu dich sehr o meine Seele
  - Various Suites for keyboard
- David Petersen – Speelstukken
- Henry Purcell
  - Fly, bold rebellion, Z.324
  - From hardy climes and dangerous toils of war, Z.325
  - Sonnata's of III. Parts (set of 12 trio sonatas, for two violins, bass, and basso continuo), published in London, Z.790-801
- Daniel Speer – Türkischer Vagant

== Opera ==
- John Blow – Venus and Adonis
- Domenico Gabrielli – Il Gige in Lidia
- Leopold I, Holy Roman Emperor – Der thöreichte Schaffer
- Jean-Baptiste Lully – Phaëton
- Alessandro Scarlatti – Pompeo

== Births ==
- January – Anthony Young, organist and composer (died 1747)
- January 14 – Gottfried Silbermann, German constructor of keyboard instruments (died 1753)
- April 17 – Johann David Heinichen, composer (died 1729)
- September 25 – Jean-Philippe Rameau, composer (died 1764)
- date unknown
  - Christoph Graupner, composer (died 1760)
  - Johann David Heinichen, composer and music theorist (died 1729)
  - Pierre-Charles Roy, librettist (died 1764)

== Deaths ==
- September 6 – Johann Melchior Gletle, organist and composer (born 1626)
- December 15 – Izaak Walton, librettist (born c. 1594)
- date unknown
  - Solomon Eccles, composer (born 1618)
  - John Hingston, organist, violist and composer
  - Nathaniel Ingelo, writer and musician (born c.1621)
  - Johann Sebastiani, composer (born 1622)
  - Jacob Stainer, luthier (born c.1617)
  - Alessandro Poglietti, organist and composer
