= Pietro Reggio =

Italian sailor

Pietro Reggio (22 November 1921 – 11 June 1994) was an Italian sailor who competed in the 1952 Summer Olympics and in the 1960 Summer Olympics.
