= Maria Xaveria Perucona =

Italian composer, nun

Maria Xaveria Perucona or Parruccona (Novara, c. 1652 - after 1709 in Galliate) was an Italian nun and composer. Her only known work, Sacri concerti de motetti a una, due, tre, e quattro voce, dates from 1675, and is a set of eighteen motets.

== Biography ==
Perucona was born in Novara in 1652. Her parents were Carlo Parruchono and his wife Margarita. She was of aristocratic birth, as were many of her fellow nun-composers such as Chiara Margarita Cozzolani. She grew up in an aristocratic family that ensured her education in singing, playing instruments and general music. She studied with her uncle, Francesco Beria, and teacher, Antonio Grosso, before she took her vows at age 16 as an Ursuline nun in the Collegio di Sant’Orsola in Galliate, near her hometown of Novara.

In 1675, her only work, Sacri concerti de motetti a una, due, tre, e quattro voce, was published in Milan and dedicated to Anna Cattarina della Cerda, who had previously made monetary gifts to Sant’Orsola. In the dedication, Perucona describes the ‘little work’ as ‘the first-born child of my poor genius’. Sacri concerti consists of 18 motets for a variety of voices, only one incorporating a liturgical text, titled Regina coeli. Other motets from this publication with non-liturgical texts were sung during certain services at the convent. The form of these works was sectional with contrasts in meter, textures, and performers. Jane Bower, editor of “Women Making Music,” holds the opinion that the most expressive use of Peruchona’s solos is found in Quid pavemus sorores, which begins with a melismatic bass solo.

Little is known of Peruchona’s life after 1690, and it is believed that she did not publish beyond Sacri concerti because her religious duties took precedence over her composing. Lazaro Agostino Cotta describes Perucona as an "excellent music teacher and an admirable singer".

== Works ==
- Sacri concerti de motetti a una, due, tre, e quattro voci, parte con Violini, e parte senza. Milan, 1675.
