= Alphonse d'Ève =

Alphonse d'Ève (baptized 20 August 1666, in Brussels; buried 10 October 1727, in Antwerp) was a Flemish Baroque composer, singer, and choirmaster.

== Biography ==
Though little is known about d'Ève's early life and education, it is possible he was trained in musical composition by his father, Honoreus Eugenius d'Ève, who served as lieutenant de musique (1662) and maître de musique (1664) in Brussels. Alphonse was documented as a bass singer for the church of St. Andries in Antwerp from 1703 to 1718, after which he left to sing at the Cathedral of Our Lady from 1718 to 1725, where he was later succeeded by Willem de Fesch. His work spread through much of the Netherlands, as evidenced by music inventories in Ghent, Huy, Aalst, and elsewhere.

== Works ==
Most of his works have been lost.

- Op.1 Genius musicus divinis, Marianis ac sanctorum laudibus decoratus, et ecclesiastico ritui, unâ, 2, 3, 4, 5, tàm vocibus quàm instrumentis officiosus (Antwerp, 1706)
- Op.3 Philimela delectans (Antwerp, 1708)
- Trio sonatas (published by Estienne Roger, Amsterdam, 1702)
- Opéra comique Het Gouvernement van Sancho Pança
