= 1677 in music =

The year 1677 in music involved some significant events.

== Events ==
- September 10 – Henry Purcell is appointed a musician to the court of Charles II of England.
- Charles Davenant's "semi-opera" Circe, with music by composer John Banister, is performed in London by the Duke's Company in May.
- Nikolay Diletsky publishes Grammatika musikiyskago peniya (Грамматика музикийского пения, "A grammar of musical song").
- Fabian Stedman publishes Tintinnalogia, or, the Art of Ringing in England.

== Publications ==
- Giovanni Battista Bassani – Balletti, Correnti, Gighe e Sarabande a due violini e basso continuo, Op.1
- Johann Melchior Gletle – Expeditionis musicae classis IV, Op.5
- Nicolas Lebègue – Pièces de Clavecin, Premier Livre
- Isabella Leonarda – Mottetti, Op.7.
- Stefano Pasino – Guida e consequenti dell'opera composta in canoni ... cioè Salmi a 4. voci C A T B..., Op. 7 (Venice: Giuseppe Sala)

== Classical music ==
- David Funck – Stricturæ viola-di gambicæ
- Jean-Baptiste Lully – Te Deum, first performed on September 9, for the baptism of Lully's son
- Georg Muffat – Violin Sonata in D major
- Alessandro Poglietti – Rossignolo
- Lucas Ruiz de Ribayaz – Luz y Norte

== Opera ==
- Carlo Grossi – La Giocasta, regina d'Armenia
- Jean-Baptiste Lully – Isis

== Births ==
- February 2 – Jean-Baptiste Morin, composer (died 1745)
- February 4 – Johann Ludwig Bach, violinist and composer, second cousin of Johann Sebastian Bach (died 1731)
- February 26 – Nicola Fago, composer and music teacher (died 1745)
- June 18 – Antonio Maria Bononcini, cellist and composer, brother of Giovanni Bononcini (died 1726)
- September 27 – Giovanni Carlo Maria Clari, composer (died 1754)
- date unknown – Christian Petzold, organist and composer (died c.1733)

== Deaths ==
- March – Robert Cambert, opera composer (born c.1628)
- August – Matthew Locke, composer (born 1621)
- November 11 – Barbara Strozzi, Italian singer and composer (born 1619)
- date unknown – Robert Cambert, composer of opera (born 1628)
