= Maria Francesca Nascinbeni =

Italian composer

Maria Francesca Nascinbeni (1658–1680) was an Italian composer.

She studied in Ancona, Italy, with the Augustinian friar Scipio Lazzarini. He included her motet Sitientes venite and works by two of his other students in his Motetti a due e tre voce. At age sixteen (December 1674), Nascinbeni published one volume of music including songs, canzonas, madrigals and motets for organ and one, two and three voices. All that is known of her life is from the prefaces to her music volumes.

== Notes ==
1.She also spelled her last name as Nascimbeni.
