= Claudia Rusca =

Italian composer, singer, and organist (1593–1676)

Canzone Prima à4 'La Borromea,' No.17 from Sacri Concerti à1-5 con Salmi e Canzoni Francesi (Milan, 1630)

Canzone Seconda à4, No.18 from Sacri Concerti à1-5 con Salmi e Canzoni Francesi (Milan, 1630)
Performed by Phillip W. Serna, Treble, Tenor & Bass Viols with Lute

Claudia Francesca Rusca (1593 – 6 October 1676) was an Italian composer, singer, and organist.

She was a nun at the Umiliate monastery of St. Caterina in Brera. She learned music at home, before she professed her final vows at the convent. She probably wrote her Sacri concerti à 1–5 con salmi e canzoni francesi (Milan, 1630) for use in the monastery and similar female institutions. The only known copy was thought to be destroyed in a fire at the Biblioteca Ambrosiana in 1943.

However, International Music Score Library Project has a facsimile available as well as modern editions of “Sacri concerti”.
