= Francesco Passarini =

Francesco Passarini (November 10, 1636 - September 23, 1694) was an Italian composer and organist. His last name is given variously as Pasarini, Passarino, and Passerini.

A native of Bologna, Passarini was the son of Antonio and Angela Cuppini; his name at birth was Camillo. He took holy orders as a Franciscan on January 28, 1652 in the same city. His musical training is unknown, though it has been posited that he studied under Agostino Filippucci. His career was peripatetic, typical of friar-musicians, and can be traced largely through his own hand; he indicated the place and date of composition on his manuscripts, and just before his death compiled an inventory of music items in his collection. He began working in his native city, moving to Ferarra to work as an organist in 1662 and remaining there for one year; 1664 found him in Correggio before returning to Bologna, where he was a maestro di cappella for a decade. His first works to see publication were issued in Bologna in 1671 and 1672; by the latter date he had taken a post at San Giovanni in Persiceto. 1673 saw Passarini named maestro di cappella at Venice's Santa Maria Gloriosa dei Frari, and he remained in that city until 1680, continuing to produce work throughout this period. Reelected to his Bologenese post on March 31, 1681, he soon took a leading position in the city's musical life. In 1691 he went to Florence, to become maestro di cappella at Santa Croce, and from 1692 until 1693 he was working in Pistoia; his last compositions date to this time. Late in 1693, he was reinstated to his position in Bologna, despite his precarious health, to which reference is made in the minutes of the order; he died in that city the following year.

Passarini's work is mainly religious in nature, ranging from monody to polychoral work and encompassing instrumental pieces and oratorios in addition to motets and other choral settings. Much of his music is preserved in Bologna, although pieces can be found in collections in Berlin, Florence, and Uppsala as well. He composed a large number of works featuring cornetto as well, only a handful of which have survived; these indicate that he used the instrument mainly as a second trumpet, rather than for its own qualities.
