= 1681 in music =

The year 1681 in music involved some significant events.

== Events ==
- Arcangelo Corelli is employed by the electoral prince of Bavaria.
- Giovanni Legrenzi becomes assistant maestro di cappella at St Mark's, Venice.
- Jean-Baptiste Lully is appointed court secretary to King Louis XIV.
- Antonio Stradivari makes the Fleming violin.

== Classical music ==
- Heinrich Biber – 8 Violin Sonatas, C 138-145
- Dietrich Buxtehude
  - Afferte Domino gloriam honorem, BuxWV 2
  - Gen Himmel zu dem Vater mein, BuxWV 32
  - Kommst du Licht der Heiden, BuxWV 66
  - Sicut Mose, BuxWV 97
  - Ich habe Lust abzuscheiden, BuxWV 46
- Giovanni Paolo Colonna
  - Motetti sacri, Op. 2
  - Motetti, Op.3
- Arcangelo Corelli – Op. 1, 12 trio sonatas
- Henry Dumont
  - Motets à II, III et IV parties pour voix et instruments avec la basse continue
  - Benedicite Deum cæli
  - Jubilate Deo
- Johann Melchoir Gletle – Ave Maria (I and II)
- Carlo Piazzi – Balletti, Op.2
- Henry Purcell – Suite for Strings, Z.770
- Alessandro Stradella – Il Barcheggio

== Opera ==
- Domenico Freschi – Pompeo Magno in Cilicia
- Jean-Baptiste Lully – Le Triomphe de l’Amour (ballet)
- Agostino Steffani – Marco Aurelio
- Marc Antonio Ziani – La Flora (composition begun by Antonio Sartorio, who died during composition)

== Publications ==
- Johann Wolfgang Franck – Geistliche Lieder (Compositions by Franck, Georg Böhm, and Peter Laurentius Wockenfuss)
- Andreas Werckmeister – Orgel-Probe (the first appearance of the tuning system known as the Werckmeister temperament)

== Births ==
- January 20 – Francesco Bartolomeo Conti, composer (died 1732)
- March 14 – Georg Philipp Telemann, composer (died 1767)
- April 11 – Anne Danican Philidor, composer and concert organizer (died 1728)
- September 4 – Carl Heinrich Biber, composer (died 1749)
- September 28 – Johann Mattheson, composer (died 1764)
- December 14 – Giuseppe Valentini, violinist and composer (died 1753)
- date unknown – Giovanni Battista Reali, composer (died 1751)

== Deaths ==
- May 25 – Pedro Calderón de la Barca, librettist (born 1600)
- June 27 – Ernst Christoph Homburg, librettist (born 1607)
- July 8 – Georg Neumark, hymnist (born 1621)
- October 22 – Benedetto Ferrari, composer (born c. 1603)
- date unknown – Francesco Corbetta, guitarist and composer (born c.1615)
- date unknown – Benedetto Ferrari, opera composer (born c.1603)
