= 1667 in music =

The year 1667 in music involved some significant events.

== Events ==
- January 27 – First performance at the Opernhaus am Taschenberg, the court opera house of the Elector of Saxony in Dresden designed by Wolf Caspar von Klengel, Giovanni Andrea Moneglia's Il teseo.
- Marc-Antoine Charpentier arrives in Rome.
- Antonio Stradivari makes the Aranyi violin.
- Cristofaro Caresana becomes an organist and singer in the Chapel Royal and director of the Neapolitan Conservatorio di Sant'Onofrio a Porta Capuana.

== Classical music ==
- Samuel Capricornus – Sonata à 8 in A minor
- Johann Heinrich Schmelzer – Arie per il balletto à cavallo
- John Weldon – The Tempest incidental music for the staged production that opened on 7 November

== Publications ==
- Giovanni Maria Bononcini – Cantatas, I-MOe Mus.F.1379
- Maurizio Cazzati – Canzonette a voce sola, libro 4, Op.43
- Paul Gerhardt – Geistliche Andachten, a collection of hymns, published in Berlin
- Adam Krieger – Arien, vol. 2
- Giovanni Legrenzi – Sacri e festivi concenti, Op.9
- Guillaume-Gabriel Nivers
  - 2e livre d'orgue contenant la messe et les hymnes de l'église, organ collection
  - Traité de la composition de musique
- Esaias Reusner – Delitiae Testudinis
- Giovanni Battista Vitali – Op. 2, a collection of sonatas
- 7 Cantatas, I-MOe Mus.F.1361 (Various composers including a 7-year old Scarlatti)

== Opera ==
- Antonio Cesti – Il pomo d'oro
- Antonio Draghi – Vero amore fa soave ogni fatica
- Carlo Pallavicino – Il Meraspe

== Births ==
- January 5 – Antonio Lotti, composer (died 1740)
- February 5 – Gottfried Reiche, composer (died 1734)
- February 21 – Bartholomäus Crasselius, hymnist (died 1724)
- April 29 – John Arbuthnot, polymath, poet, and librettist (died 1735)
- July 16 – Giuseppe Maria Jacchini, cellist and composer (died 1727)
- September 24 – Jean-Louis Lully, musician and composer, son of Jean-Baptiste Lully (died 1688)
- December 4 – Michel Pignolet de Montéclair, composer (died 1737)
- December 15
  - Floriano Arresti (French), Italian composer (died 1717)
  - Ernest Louis, composer and landgrave (died 1739)
- December 18 – Wenzel Ludwig von Radolt, composer (died 1716)
- date unknown
  - Johann Christoph Pepusch, composer (died 1752)

== Deaths ==
- February 6 – Giovanni Martino Cesare, cornet player and composer (born c.1590)
- May 2 – George Wither, librettist, poet, and hymn composer (born 1588)
- May 7 – Johann Jakob Froberger, organist and composer (born 1616)
- May 18 – Melchior Schildt, composer and organist (born 1592 or 93)
- June 18 – Luise Henriette von Oranien, lyricist (born 1627)
- July – Francesco Manelli, composer (born 1594)
- August 31 – Johann Rist, poet who authored many hymns (born 1607)
- November 5 – Franz Tunder, composer (born 1614)
- November 16 – Nathanael Schnittelbach, composer (born 1633)
- date unknown – Johann Schop, violinist and composer (born c.1590)
