= 1675 in music =

The year 1675 in music involved some significant events.

== Events ==
- Agostino Steffani is appointed court organist at Munich.
- Johann Krieger performs at Vienna, and is rewarded by Leopold I, Holy Roman Emperor.

== Publications ==
- Gaspar Sanz – Instrucción de música sobre la guitarra española, Libre 2

== Classical music ==
- Johann Rudolph Ahle – Toccata ex Clave D
- Marc-Antoine Charpentier
  - Ave maris stella, H.60
  - De Profundis, H.232
- Christian Geist – Laudet Deum mea
- Guillaume-Gabriel Nivers – 3e livre d'orgue des huit tons de l'église, organ collection
- Maria Xaveria Perucona – Sacri Concerti de Mottetti, Op.1
- Johann Christoph Pezel – Bicinia variorum instrumentorum
- Alessandro Stradella – Qual prodigio è ch'io miri, a serenata

== Opera ==
- Matthew Locke – Psyche
- Giovanni Legrenzi – La divisione del mondo
- Jean-Baptiste Lully – Thésée, LWV 5

== Births ==
- July 12 – Evaristo Felice Dall'Abaco, Italian composer (died 1742)
- August 1 – William Williams, composer (died 1701)
- date unknown – Louis de La Coste, composer (died 1750)
- probable
  - Michel de La Barre, composer (died 1745)
  - Giovanni Porta, opera composer (died 1755)
  - Tommaso Redi, composer

== Deaths ==
- March 23 – Anthoni van Noordt, Dutch organist and composer (born 1619)
- September 5 – Carlos Patiño, composer (born 1600)
- October 29 – Andreas Hammerschmidt, organist and composer (born c.1611)
- November 14 – Johannes Khuen, priest, poet and composer (born 1606)
- date unknown – Wojciech Bobowski, Polish Ottoman musician (born 1610)
