= 1669 in music =

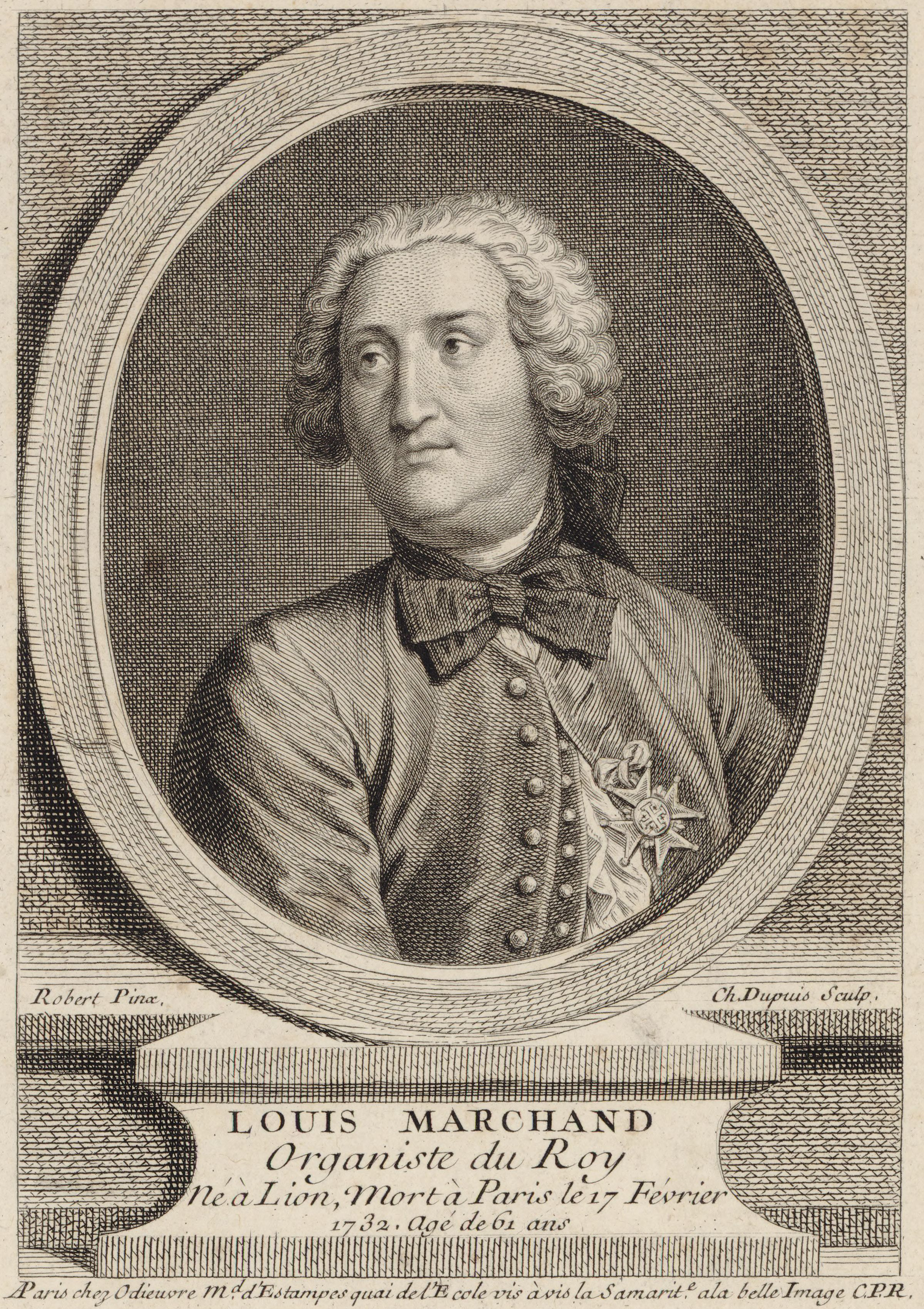
Louis Marchand (2 February 1669 – 17 February 1732), French composer and organist

The year 1669 in music involved some significant events.

== Events ==
- February 17 – Première of Alessandro Melani's opera L'empio punito at the Teatro di Palazzo Colonna in Rome. The work was commissioned by Marie Mancini.

== Publications ==
- Luigi Battiferri – Ricercari, Op.3
- Giovanni Maria Bononcini – Op. 3, a collection of sonatas in canon
- Henri Dumont – Cinq messes en plain-chant
- Johann Caspar Kerll – Delectus sacrarum cantionum, 26 motets for 2–5 voices, 2 violins and basso continuo
- Henry Lawes
  - Select Ayres and Dialogues
  - The Treasury of Musick
- Samuel Capricornus
  - Continuatio theatri musici
  - Scelta musicale
  - Theatrum musicum
- Giovanni Antonio Pandolfi – Sonate cioè balletti, sarabande, correnti, passacagli, capricetti e una trombetta...
- Maurizio Cazzati – Varii, e diversi capricci per camera, Op. 50

== Classical music ==
- Johann Schmelzer – Sonata a 4, La Carolietta

== Opera ==
- Francesco Cavalli – Coriolano
- Antonio Cesti – Genserico
- Antonio Draghi – Achille in Sciro
- Jean-Baptiste Lully – Monsieur de Pourceaugnac, LWV 41

== Births ==
- April 6 – Johann Christopf Faber, composer, organist, and organ builder (died 1742)
- February 2 – Louis Marchand, organist, harpsichordist and composer (died 1732)
- June 18 – Maria Maddalena Musi, Italian soprano (died 1751)
- August 24 – Alessandro Marcello, composer (died 1747)
- October 10 – Johann Nicolaus Bach, composer (died 1753)
- October 13 – Charles Desmazures, composer (died 1736)
- date unknown
  - Johann Samuel Beyer, composer (died 1744)
  - Miquel López Sebastián, composer (died 1723)

== Deaths ==
- April 6 – Lars Wivallius, librettist (born 1605)
- April 17 – Antonio Bertali, violinist and composer (born 1605)
- May? – Étienne Richard, composer, organist and harpsichordist (born c.1621)
- October 14 – Antonio Cesti, opera composer (born 1623)
- October 28 – Agustin Moreto y Cavana, poet (born 1618)
- date unknown
  - Richard Ayleward, musician and composer (born 1626)
  - Christopher Simpson, viola da gamba player and composer (born c.1605)
- probable – Étienne Moulinié, composer (born c.1600)
