= Giovanni Paolo Colonna =

Italian composer

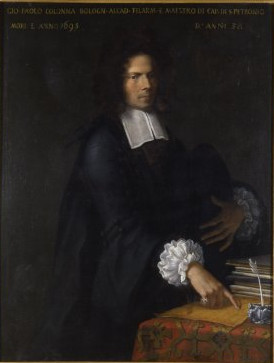
Portrait of Giovanni Paolo Colonna by Giovanni Maria Viani (from the collection of the International museum and library of music, Bologna)

Giovanni Paolo Colonna (16 June 1637 – 28 November 1695) was an Italian composer, teacher, organist and organ builder. In addition to being chapel-master and organist of San Petronio Basilica in Bologna, he served prominent members of the courts of Ferrara, Parma, Modena and Florence. He was a founder-member and president of the Accademia Filarmonica di Bologna. Emperor Leopold I collected manuscripts of his sacred music, which reflects the Roman church cantata style of Giacomo Carissimi and looks forward to the manner of George Frideric Handel.

== Biography ==
Colonna was born on 16 June 1637 in Bologna (at the time, the second largest city of the Papal States after Rome), the third of four brothers in a family of five children, son of Antonio Colonna (c. 1600–1666), a well-known organ builder, and his wife, Francesca Dinarelli. Colonna's father, nicknamed Dal Corno, was the adopted son of Stefano Colonna, a member of a large and successful family of organ-builders which had been active in central-northern Italy since the previous century. Born in Salò, near Brescia around the turn of the century, Antonio may have moved with his stepfather Stefano to Bologna by 1615.

Colonna received full training both in the family profession of organ building and in musicianship. He was a pupil of Agostino Filippuzzi in Bologna, and of Antonio Maria Abbatini and Orazio Benevoli in Rome, where for a time he held the post of organist at S. Apollinare. A poem in praise of his music shows that he began to distinguish himself as a composer in 1659. In that year, he was appointed organist at S. Petronio in Bologna, where on 1 November 1674, he was made chapel-master.

From 1680 until 1694, he was in regular correspondence with Francesco II d'Este, Duke of Modena, for whom he wrote oratorios and helped construct organs. Other prominent patrons included the Marquis of Ferrara, Ranuccio II Farnese, Duke of Parma, and the Medici family in Florence, for whom he composed secular cantatas. In 1666, he was one of the founder-members of the Accademia Filarmonica of Bologna, of which was president from 1672 to 1691. In 1694, he travelled to Rome to try to mend bridges following a dispute regarding Arcangelo Corelli's use of parallel fifths, in which he had been involved; while there, he turned down an offer from Pope Innocent XII to become chapel-master of St. Peter's Basilica, perhaps because of ill health. He died in Bologna in 1695.

Colonna's pupils included the cellist-composers Giovanni Bononcini and Antonio Maria Bononcini.

== Music ==
Most of Colonna's works are for the church, including settings of the psalms for three, four, five and eight voices, and various masses and motets. He also composed an opera, Amilcare. He was an important composer of oratorios, eight of which have survived, including La Profezia d'Eliseo.

Emperor Leopold I received a copy of every sacred composition of Colonna, and the Austrian National Library now possesses 83 such works. His writing takes into account the resonant acoustics of S. Petronio, and many of his pieces for double choir incorporate two separate continuo parts to be played on the church's two organs.

Colonna's style is for the most part dignified, with transitions in style and taste characteristic of a period when church music was in a state of transition, and was still learning to combine the gravity of the old style with the brilliance of the new.

The strings in his Messe e salmi concertati op.10 have independent parts with semiquaver runs in full concerto style. Some of his motets (e.g., the solo motets, op.2, and the two- and three-part motets, op.3), are written in the lively melodic contrapuntal style of the Roman church cantatas of Giacomo Carissimi, and look forward to the chamber cantatas of Handel. In some of his late works he was able to create elaborate effects through his command of melodic line and harmony.
