= Johann Nikolaus Hanff =

German composer and organist

Johann Nikolaus Hanff (25 September 1663 – 25 December 1711) was a North German organist and composer. Hanff was born in Wechmar in Thuringia and worked in Eutin, Hamburg and Schleswig.

In 1696 he became organist and conductor to the Bishop of Lübeck. Hanff’s style, with the melody moving slowly but with rich ornamentation above a slow-moving and not very clearly individualized accompaniment, was favored by Buxtehude.

While in Hamburg, Hanff taught harpsichord and composition to the young Johann Mattheson for four years. Mattheson was to become a composer, music theorist and close friend of George Frideric Handel (who almost killed Handel in a duel).

After the death of Bishop August Friedrich and the dissolution of the court in 1705, Hanff probably returned to Hamburg, where in 1706 and 1711 two children were born to him. On 26 August 1711 he took over the organist position at Schleswig Cathedral but died a few months later.

In 1997, the asteroid (7902) Hanff was named after him.
