= 1665 in music =

The year 1665 in music involved some significant events.

== Events ==
- May 27 – John Loosemore completes the construction of the organ at Exeter Cathedral.
- Francesco Cavalli becomes first organist of St Mark's Basilica in Venice.

== Bands formed ==
- Band of the Grenadier Guards, under the terms of a Royal Warrant issued the previous year.

== Publications ==
- Christoph Bernhard – Geistliche Harmonien, Op.1
- Wojciech Bobowski – Mezmurlar, a collection of psalms in Turkish
- Giovanni Felice Sances – Missa Sanctae Mariae Magdalenae
- Christopher Simpson – The Principles of Practical Musick

== Classical music ==
- John Blow – I will always give thanks
- Maurizio Cazzati
  - Sonate a 2, 3, 4 e 5 con alcune per tromba, Op.35
  - Messa e salmi a 5 voci con 4 istromenti, Op.36
- Jean Baptiste Lully – La naissance de Vénus, LWV 27 (ballet, premiered Jan. 26 in Paris)
- Guillaume-Gabriel Nivers – Livre d'orgue contenant cent pièces de tous les tons de l'église, the first organ collection that featured forms that became standard for the French Baroque organ school

== Opera ==
- Antonio Bertali – L'Alcindo
- Andrea Mattioli – Ciro

== Births ==
- February 21 (baptized) – Benedikt Anton Aufschnaiter, Austrian Baroque composer (died 1742)
- March 17 – Élisabeth Jacquet de La Guerre, harpsichordist and composer (died 1729)
- date unknown
  - Benedikt Anton Aufschnaiter, composer (died 1742)
  - Nicolaus Bruhns, organist and composer (died 1697)
  - Johann Nikolaus Hanff, organist and composer (died 1712)
  - José de Torres, composer, organist, music theorist and music publisher (died 1738)
- probable – Carlo Giuseppe Testore, luthier (died 1716)

== Deaths ==
- January 21 – Domenico Mazzochi, Italian composer (born 1592)
- November 16 – João Lourenço Rebelo, Portuguese court composer (born 1610)
- December 10 – Tarquinio Merula, organist, violinist and composer (born c.1594)
