= 1682 in music =

The year 1682 in music involved some significant events.

== Classical music ==
- Heinrich Ignaz Franz von Biber – Plaudite tympana
- Jacques Bittner – Pièces de luth
- John Blow – Ode for New Year's Day
- Marc-Antoine Charpentier
  - Quam dilecta, H.186
  - In nativitatem Domini canticum, H.393
  - Les plaisirs de Versailles, H.480
- Andrea Grossi – Sonate a 2–5 instromenti
- Johann Sigismund Kusser – Composition de musique suivant la méthode françoise
- Carlo Mannelli – Sonate a tre, Op.2
- Alessandro Melani – Concerti Spirituali, Op.3
- Georg Muffat – Armonico tributo, a collection of sonatas
- Johann Rosenmüller – Sonatae à 2,3,4 e 5 stromenti da arco et altri
- Robert de Visée – Livre di guittarre dédié au roy
- Neu Leipziger Gesangbuch

== Opera ==
- Domenico Gabrielli – Flavio Cuniberto
- Jean-Baptiste Lully – Persée

== Births ==
- January 17 – Jean-François Dandrieu, composer (died 1738)
- (baptised) February 21 – Johann Jacob Bach III, German composer, older brother of Johann Sebastian Bach, (died 1722)
- April 3 – Johann Valentin Rathgeber, German composer (died 1750)
- April 16 – Jean-Joseph Mouret, French composer (died 1738)
- September 13 – Theodor Christlieb Reinhold, composer (died 1755)
- Christian Ferdinand Abel, German violist (died 1761)
- Santiago de Murcia, composer for guitar (died 1737)
- Vijaya Dasa, composer, philosopher, and saint (died 1755)

== Deaths ==
- February 25 – Alessandro Stradella, Italian composer (born 1639; murdered)
- Francis Sempill, Scottish writer of ballads (born c.1616)
