= Isabella Leonarda =

Italian composer (1620–1704)

- Portrait from Leonarda family tree
- Born: 6 September 1620; Novara, Italy
- Died: 25 February 1704 (aged 83); Novara, Italy
- Occupations: Composer; music teacher
- Parents: Giannantonio Leonardi (father); Apollonia Leonardi (mother)

Isabella Leonarda (6 September 1620 – 25 February 1704) was an Italian composer from Novara. At the age of 16, she entered the Collegio di Sant'Orsola, an Ursuline convent, where she stayed for the remainder of her life. Leonarda is most renowned for the numerous compositions that she wrote during her time at the convent, making her one of the most productive female composers of her time.

== Biography ==
Isabella Leonarda was born on 6 September 1620, the daughter of Giannantonio Leonardi and his wife, Apollonia. The Leonardi were an old and prominent Novarese family whose members included important church and civic officials and knights palatine. Isabella's father, who held the title of count, was a doctor of laws.

In 1636, Leonarda entered the Collegio di Sant'Orsola, an Ursuline convent in Novara. Her family maintained close ties with Sant'Orsola as benefactors, which some speculate may have contributed to Leonarda's influence within the convent. She held various positions of authority throughout her time at Sant'Orsola – as madre (1676), superiora (1686), madre vicaria (1693), and consigliera (1700). The precise significance of those titles is unclear, but superiora was probably the highest office in the convent.

Leonarda was a highly regarded composer in her home city, but her music was apparently little known in other parts of Italy. Lazzaro Agostino Cotta called her "la Musa novarese" (the muse of Novara) when he published a sonnet by A. Saminiati Lucchese which praised her musical talent, comparing it to the military prowess of Emperor Leopold I. Her published compositions span a period of 60 years, beginning with the dialogues of 1640 and concluding with the Motetti a voce sola of 1700. Leonarda is credited with producing nearly two hundred compositions during that period, though her only works appearing before 1670 were the dialogues printed by Gasparo Casati. It appears that she was over the age of 50 before she started composing regularly, and it was at that time that she began publishing the works that we know her for today.

== Working in music ==
Leonarda was not well known as a singer or instrumentalist, and not much is known about her involvement in those activities. That did not detract from her fame, however, as one of the most prolific convent composers of the Baroque era, writing approximately 200 compositions during her lifetime.

=== Teaching and learning ===
Not much is known about Leonarda's musical education before entering Sant'Orsola, though many have speculated that she may have had some such education due to the high social and economic status of her family. It has also been suggested that once in the convent, she studied with Gasparo Casati (1610–1641), a talented but little-known composer who was maestro di cappella at the Novara Cathedral from 1635 until his death. The only direct evidence linking the two, however, is Casati's Terzo libro di sacri concenti, which contains two dramatic dialogues, the earliest known compositions of Leonarda.

A 1658 convent document identified Leonarda as magistra musicae (music teacher). It seems from this that she played some role in teaching the other nuns to play music. The convent's nuns may have performed Leonarda's works.

=== Compositions ===
Leonarda wrote music in nearly every sacred genre: motets and sacred concertos for one to four voices, sacred Latin dialogues, psalm settings, responsories, Magnificats, litanies, masses, and sonate da chiesa. In addition, she wrote music for solo and continuo, chorus, and strings. Leonarda also wrote a few sacred solo songs with vernacular texts. Her sonata da chiesa, Op. 16, was the first published instrumental sonata by a woman.

Though Leonarda's predominant genre was the solo motet, most of her notable historical achievements came from her sonatas. She was the first woman to publish sonatas, composing many throughout her lifetime. For example, Sonatas 1 through 11 are for two violins, violone, and organ. Sonatas 1, 3, 4, 7, and 8 are "concerted sonatas": each of the three instruments has at least one solo passage. Sonata 12 is Leonarda's only solo sonata and one of her most renowned compositions. It is divided into seven sections with two slow movements which are recitative-like, inviting improvised embellishments.

=== Musical style ===
In the early 17th century, Italian music, there is a distinction between prima pratica and seconda pratica. In general, education in the prima pratica style was not widely available for women. Leonarda, however, was educated in formal counterpoint and uses it in many of her pieces. Leonarda's intricate use of harmonies is one example of her influence in the cultivation of polyphonic music at Sant'Orsola, as many other Italian nun composers were doing at their own convents during the same period. This style created an atmosphere conducive to the creativity of the musician, allowing for slight improvisation or musical ornamentation.

Leonarda's sonatas are unusual in their formal structure. It is generally held that Arcangelo Corelli established the "standard" four-movement, slow–fast–slow–fast form of the sonata da chiesa. Leonarda's sonatas, however, vary from as few as four (Sonatas 6 and 9) to as many as thirteen movements (Sonata 4), and her sonatas in four sections do not follow the slow–fast–slow–fast model. Additionally, Leonarda uses refrains in a rather unusual way. Sonata 5 is the most regular; Sonata 10 has two refrains, in the pattern A–B–C–D–E–B–D–F–B–G. Sonata 4 has quite an unusual plan of A–B–C–D–E–F–G–H–I–J–I'–J'–I''. Sections are essentially of three types: (1) fast sections in duple metre, often with some imitation, derived from the canzona tradition; (2) slow, expressive, homophonic sections in duple meter, related perhaps to the toccata and recitative; and (3) homophonic sections (occasionally with brief passages in imitation) in triple time, apparently related to the dance.

=== Publication dedications ===
Almost all of Leonarda's works carry a double dedication – one to the Virgin Mary as well as one to a highly placed living person. In one of her dedications, Leonarda stated that she wrote music not to gain credit in the world, but so that all would know that she was devoted to the Virgin Mary. The living dedicatees include the archbishop of Milan, the bishop of Novara, and Emperor Leopold I. The need to seek financial support for the convent likely motivated many of these dedications. She also noted in the dedication to Opus 10 that she wrote music only during the time allotted for rest so as not to neglect her administrative duties within the convent. This contradicts the common speculation that Leonarda was able to spend more time composing than other nuns of the time due to her position of authority within the convent.

=== Selected compositions ===
Vocal Works

- 16 Motets, op. 3
- Messa concertata, op. 4
- 12 Motets, op. 6
- 12 Motets, op. 7
- 12 Motets, op. 11
- 12 Motets, op. 13
- 10 Motets, op. 14
- 11 Motets, op. 15
- Cara plage, cari adores, op. 17, no. 9
- Beatus vir, op. 19, no. 4
- Ah Domine Iesu (Trio)
- Alma Redemptoris Mater (SATB)
- Ave Regina Caelorum, op. 10 (SATB)

Instrumental compositions

- Sonatas, op. 16
- Motet for solo voice, with instruments, op. 20
