= Giovanni Battista Bassani =

Italian composer

Giovanni Battista Bassani (c. 1650 – 1 October 1716) was an Italian composer, violinist, and organist.

== Biography ==
Bassani was born in Padua. It is thought that he studied in Venice under Daniele Castrovillari and in Ferrara under Giovanni Legrenzi. Charles Burney and John Hawkins claimed he taught Arcangelo Corelli, but there is no solid evidence for this assertion. He was an organist at the Accademia della Morte in Ferrara from 1667, but had probably left by 1675. He published his first music in 1677; the title page calls him maestro of music at the Confraternità della Morte in Finale Emilia, not far from Modena. He was maestro di cappella at Duke Alessandro II della Mirandola's court in 1680, and was elected principe at the Accademica Filarmonica in Bologna. He became maestro di cappella at the Accademia della Morte in Ferrara in 1683, and then maestro di cappella at Ferrara Cathedral in 1686. For his contributions to the musical life of Ferrara, he was often called "Bassani of Ferrara". He wrote 76 liturgically ordered services for use at Ferrara Cathedral between 1710 and 1712. He became director of music at Santa Maria Maggiore in Bergamo in 1712, and also taught at the Congregazione di Carità in the same city until his death.

Bassani was a celebrated violinist in his own time, and his fame was compounded by Burney's praise for him. His trio sonatas are his best-known and most often performed pieces in modern times. He wrote 13 oratorios, but only four survive, and all 13 of his operas have been lost aside from a few arias from Gli amori alla moda.

== Works ==
Operas

- L'amorosa preda di Paride, 1683
- Falarido, tiranno d'Agrigento, 1685
- L'Alarico, re de'Goti, 1685
- Vitige, re de'Vandalia, 1686
- Agrippina in Baia, 1687
- Gli amori alla moda, 1688, 10 arias survive
- Il trionfo di Venere in Ida, 1688
- La Ginevra, infanta di Scozia, 1690
- Le vicende di cocceio Nerva, 1691
- Gli amori tra gl'odii, o sia Il Ramiro in Norvegia, 1693
- Roderico, 1696
- Armida al campo, 1711

Oratorios

- L'Esaltazione di S Croce, 1675
- L'Epulone, 1675
- La tromba della divina misericordia, 1676
- L'amore ingeniero, 1678
- Il mistico Roveto, 1681
- La morte delusa, 1686
- Il Davide punito overo La pestilente strage d'Israele, 1686; performed as Nella luna eclissata dal Cristiano valore, 1687, and as La Pietà trionfante della morte, 1692 and 1697
- Il Giona, 1689
- Mosè risorto dalle acque, 1694
- Il conte di Bacheville, 1696
- Susanna, 1697
- Gl'impegni del divino amore nel transito della Beata Caterina Vegri detta di Bologna, 1703
- Il trionfo della Fede, 1704

Other vocal works

- 8 masses
- at least 20 motets
- various sacred solo vocal works and choral works
- 76 services, most with four solo voices, chorus, and basso continuo

Instrumental music

- 16 trio sonatas
- 12 sinfonie da chiesa, op. 5, 1683
