= 1671 in music =

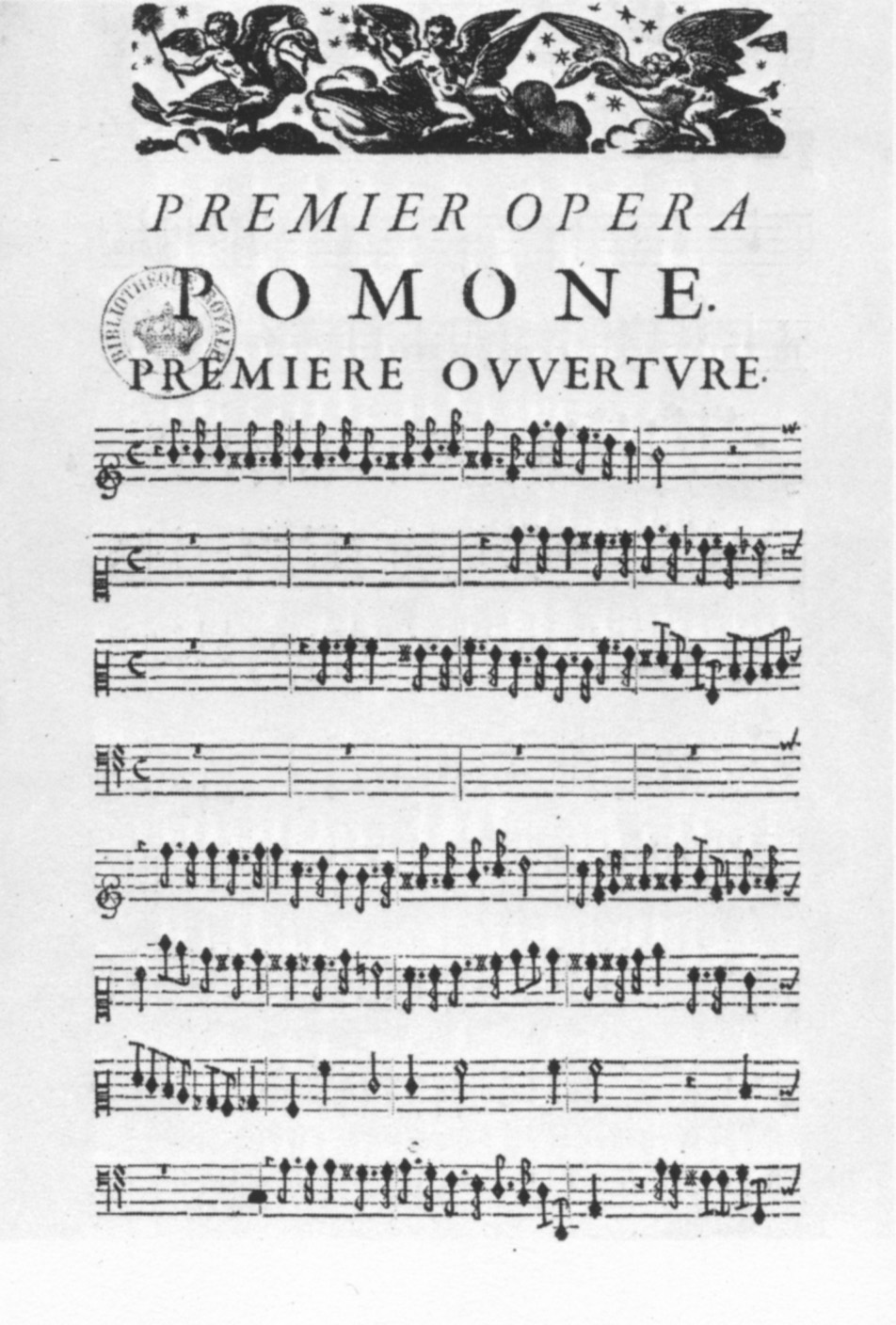

The year 1671 in music involved some significant musical events.

== Events ==
- March 3 – Opening of the Paris Opera, with the opera Pomone by Robert Cambert.
- Philippe Quinault, Molière and Pierre Corneille, collaborate with Jean-Baptiste Lully on a court entertainment.
- Arcangelo Corelli settles in Rome after spending four years studying violin in Bologna.
- Maurizio Cazzati is dismissed from his post as Maestro di Cappella in San Petronio, Bologna, as a result of controversy over his alleged failure to enforce the rules of counterpoint, and returns to Mantua where he spends the rest of his career as Maestro di Cappella da Camera to Duchess Isabella.
- Ignazio Albertini arrives in Vienna with a letter of recommendation from Johann Heinrich Schmelzer.

== Classical music ==
- Johann Georg Ahle – Neues Zehn Geistlicher Arien
- Cristofaro Caresana – Sonata à 8 (February 1671)
- The Notebook of Anna Maria van Eyl, including compositions by Gisbert Steenwick, Johann Caspar Kerll, Heinrich Scheidemann.
- Denis Gaultier – Pièces de Luth sur trois différents modes nouveaux
- Andreas Hammerschmidt – Sechsstimmige Fest- und Zeit-Andachten
- Giovanni Legrenzi – Op. 8, a collection of sonatas
- Guilliaume-Gabriel Nivers – Antiphonarium romanum
- Francesco Passarini
  - Salmi concertati... (Bologna: Giacomo Monti)
  - Antifone della Beata Vergini a voce sola... (Bologna: Giacomo Monti)
- Heinrich Schütz – Meine Seele erhebt den Herren, SWV 494

== Opera ==
- Robert Cambert – Pomone (premiered March 3 in Paris)
- Antonio Pietro Degli – L'inganno fortunato
- Antonio Draghi – L'avidità di Mida
- Domenico Freschi & Gasparo Sartorio – Iphide greca
- Jean-Baptist Lully – Psyche, LWV 45 (premiered January 17 in Paris)

== Births ==
- February 19 – Charles-Hubert Gervais, composer (died 1744)
- April 18 – Johann Burchard Freystein, hymn-writer (died 1718)
- May 12 – Erdmann Neumeister, hymnologist and priest (died 1756)
- May 21 – Azzolino Bernardino della Ciaja, organist, harpsichordist, composer and organ builder (died 1755)
- June 8 – Tomaso Albinoni, composer (died 1751)
- June 16 – Johann Christoph Bach, musician and composer (died 1721)
- June 30 – Teodorico Pedrini, priest, missionary, musician and composer (died 1746)
- September – Antoine Forqueray, viola da gamba virtuoso and composer (died 1745)
- September 7 – Antoine Danchet, French playwright and opera librettist (died 1748)
- October 17 – Agostino Piovene, Venetian poet and opera librettist (died 1721)
- probable – Robert Valentine, recorder player and composer (died 1747)

== Deaths ==
- date unknown – Daniel Farrant, composer, viol player and instrument maker (born 1575)
