= 1661 in music =

The year 1661 in music involved some significant events.

== Events ==
- April 19 – Maria Cattarina Calegari takes her final vows and becomes a nun at the Benedictine Convent of Santa Margherita in Milan.
- November 4 – Samuel Pepys' diary records a visit to the opera.
- King Louis XIV of France creates the Académie Royale de Danse.
- Jean-Baptiste Lully becomes a French subject.
- First public opera performances in Antwerp, on the stage of the Schouwburgh van de Oude Voetboog.

== Classical music ==
- Thomas Gobert – Pseaume XVIII
- Matthew Locke – Flatt Consort
- Heinrich Schütz – Becker Psalter (revised and enlarged edition)
- Gaspar de Verlit – Missae et motettae nec non quator antiphonae B. Mariae Virginis, vol. 1

== Opera ==
- Antonio Bertali – Il Ciro crescente
- Jacopo Melani – Ercole in Tebe
- Antonio Sartorio – Gl'amori infruttuosi di Pirro

== Births ==
- February – Henri Desmarets, composer (died 1741)
- February 5 – Barbara Kluntz, composer (died 1730)
- June 6 – Giacomo Antonio Perti, composer (died 1756)
- September 2 – Georg Böhm, organist and composer (died 1733)
- November 1 – Florent Carton (Dancourt), librettist (died 1725)
- date unknown – Francesco Gasparini, composer (died 1727)

== Deaths ==
- May 4 – Jean de Cambefort, composer (born 1605)
- May 9 – Alberich Mazak, composer (born 1609)
- June 3 – Gottfried Scheidt, organist and composer (born 1593)
- August 29 – Louis Couperin, harpsichordist and composer (born c.1626)
- October – Germain Pinel, harpsichordist and composer (born c. 1600)
- November 16 – João Lourenço Rebelo, composer (born 1610)
- December 29 – Antoine Girard, librettist (born 1594)
