= 1679 in music =

The year 1679 in music involved some significant events.

== Events ==
- Victims of the plague in Vienna include Anna Catharina, wife of Johann Caspar Kerll. Kerll later commemorates the event in his Modulatio organica.

== Publications ==
- Stefano Pasino – Sonatas for 2, 3, & 4 instruments, Op. 8 (Venice: Francesco Magni for Gardano)

== Classical music ==
- Johann Valentin Meder – Ach Herr strafe mich nicht
- Henry Purcell
  - O God the King of Glory, Z.34
  - O Lord Our Governor, Z.39
- Marc-Antoine Charpentier
  - 2 menuets pour les flûtes allemandes, H.541
  - Caprise, H.542
- Johann Pachelbel's earliest datable works were composed for the 1679 Erbhuldigung at Erfurt. The works in question are two arias, So ist denn dies der Tag and So ist denn nur die Treu.
- Choral music is composed by the Valladolid chapel-master Miguel Gomez Camargo (1654–1690).

== Opera ==
- Jean-Baptiste Lully – Cadmus et Hermione, LWV 49
- Carlo Pallavicino
  - Il Nerone
  - Le amazoni nell'isole fortunate
  - Messalina
- Johann Paul Agricola – Streit der Schönheit und der Tugend
- Petronio Franceschini – Apollo in Tessaglia
- Alessandro Scarlatti – Gli equivoci nel sembiante
- Marc'Antonio Ziani – Alessandro Magno in Sidone

== Births ==
- January 5 – Pietro Filippo Scarlatti, organist, choirmaster and composer (died 1750)
- February 14 – Georg Friedrich Kauffmann, composer (died 1735)
- May 4 – Johann Georg Mozart, grandfather of Wolfgang Amadeus Mozart (died 1736)
- October 11 – Christian Vater, organ and harpsichord builder (died 1756)
- October 16 – Jan Dismas Zelenka, composer (died 1745)
- December 24 – Domenico Sarro, composer (died 1744)
- date unknown – Balthasar Siberer, organ teacher (died 1757)

== Deaths ==
- May 1 – Esaias Reusner, composer and lutenist (born 1636)
- June 27 – Pablo Bruna, blind organist and composer (born 1611)
- probable
  - Antonio Maria Abbatini, composer (born 1595)
  - Dietrich Becker, violinist and composer
