= Giovanni Maria Bononcini =

Italian violinist and composer

Giovanni Maria Bononcini (1642-1678) was an Italian violinist, theorist, composer, and the father of a musical dynasty. He published his treatise, the Music Prattico in 1673, and was the father to two composers, Giovanni Bononcini and Antonio Maria Bononcini.

== Life and Works ==
Giovanni Maria Bononcini (1642-1678) was a violinist, composer, and theorist in the late 17th century. While the exact year is unknown, he left home as a young boy. He traveled to Modena to study with Marco Uccellini, who was the head of instrumental music at the Etse court, and initiated a tradition of Modenese violinists and composers. Bononcini’s His largest contribution to the musical world is his treatise Musico Prattico, which was published in 1673. His treatise explored rules of counterpoint, twelve-mode theory, and composition. His work heavily influenced styles of the late Baroque period.

Bononcini married his wife Anna Maria Prezii on February 19th 1662, and while they had eight children, only two of the survived. Both of their surviving sons, Giovanni Bononcini and Antonio Maria Bononcini went on to be composers themselves, with Giovanni Bononcini (the elder son) becoming a court musician in Modena. Four months after the death of his wife Anna, he remarried a woman named Barbara Agnes Tosatti on June 29th, 1677. Their son, Giovanni Maria(ii) (also called Angelo) was born just four hours after the passing of his father on November 18th, 1678.

Bononcini wrote many sonatas, and after publishing his third book of sonatas he was appointed as both the violinist of the cathedral, as well as the chamber musician at the Dowager Duchess Laura d’Este in 1671. Bononcini focused primarily on instrumental works up until around 1675. In his final years leading up to his death, he wrote several madrigals and cantatas. In addition to these vocal works, he also wrote an opera, but unfortunately only the libretto has been uncovered.

- op. 1 Primi Frutti del Giardino Musicale à due violini e basso (Venice, 1666)
- op. 2 Sonate da camera, e da ballo a 1, 2, 3, e 4 (Venice, 1667)
- op. 3 Varii fiori del giardino musicale, overo Sonate da camera … aggiunta d'alcuni canoni, for 2 Violins, Viola and B. c. (Bologna, 1669)
- op. 4 Arie, correnti, sarabande, gighe, & allemande for Violin and Cello or Spinett (Bologna, 1671)
- op. 5 5 Sinfonie, allemande, correnti, e sarabande à 5–6 stromenti, aggiunta d'una sinfonia a quattro, che si può suonare ancora al contrario (Bologna, 1671)
- op. 6 Sonate da chiesa à due violini (Venice, 1673)
- op. 7 Ariette, correnti, gighe, allemande, e sarabande for 1–4 instruments (Bologna, 1673)
- op. 8 Musico prattico che brevemente dimostra il modo di giungere alla perfetta cognizione di tutte quelle cose, che concorrono alla composizione de i canti, e di ciò ch'all'arte del contrapunto si ricerca, (Bologna, 1673; German translation Stuttgart, 1701)
- op. 9 Trattenimenti musicali à tre & à quattro stromenti (Bologna, 1675)
- op. 10 Cantate per camera a voce sola, libro primo (Bologna, 1677)
- op. 11 Cantate per camera a voce sola, libro secondo (Bologna, 1678)
- op. 12 Arie e Correnti à tre, due violini e violone (Bologna, 1678)
- numerous Madrigals and Arias
- Madrigali a 5 voci, Libro 1, Op.11- 1. Di Leopoldo Augusto. Mode I Dorian, 2. Amor io parto. Mode II Hypodorian, 3. Ardo si, ma non t’amo. Mode III Phrygian, 4. So che tu voi ch’io mora. Mode IV Hypophrygian, 5. Mi die Clori un Narciso. Mode V Lydian, 6. Vede our nel mio volto. Mode VI Hypolydian, 7. Mia Diva io non so dire. Mode VII Mixolydian, 8. Chi va cercand’ Amore. Mode VIII Hypomixolydian, 9. Mentre la bella faccia. Mode IX, 10. Questa sovrana luce. Mode X, 11. Care lagrime mie. Mode XI, 12. Cor mio deh non languire. Mode XII, 13. Non piu guerra. All Modes.
- 1 Opera I primi voli dell’aquila Austriaca del soglio imperiale alla gloria (Modena, 1667)

== Reading ==
- Klenz, William (1962). Giovanni Maria Bononcini of Modena: A Chapter in Baroque Instrumental Music. Durham: Duke University Press. Barnett, Gregory. “Giovanni Maria Bononcini and the Uses of the Modes.” The Journal of Musicology 25, no. 3 (2008): 230–86. https://doi.org/10.1525/jm.2008.25.3.230.
- Bononcini, Giovanni Maria. Musico Prattico. A Facsimile of the 1673 Bologna Edition. Broude Brothers Limited, New York 1969.
- Reprint: Westport: Greenwood Press 1987, ISBN 0-313-25655-1.
