= 1666 in music =

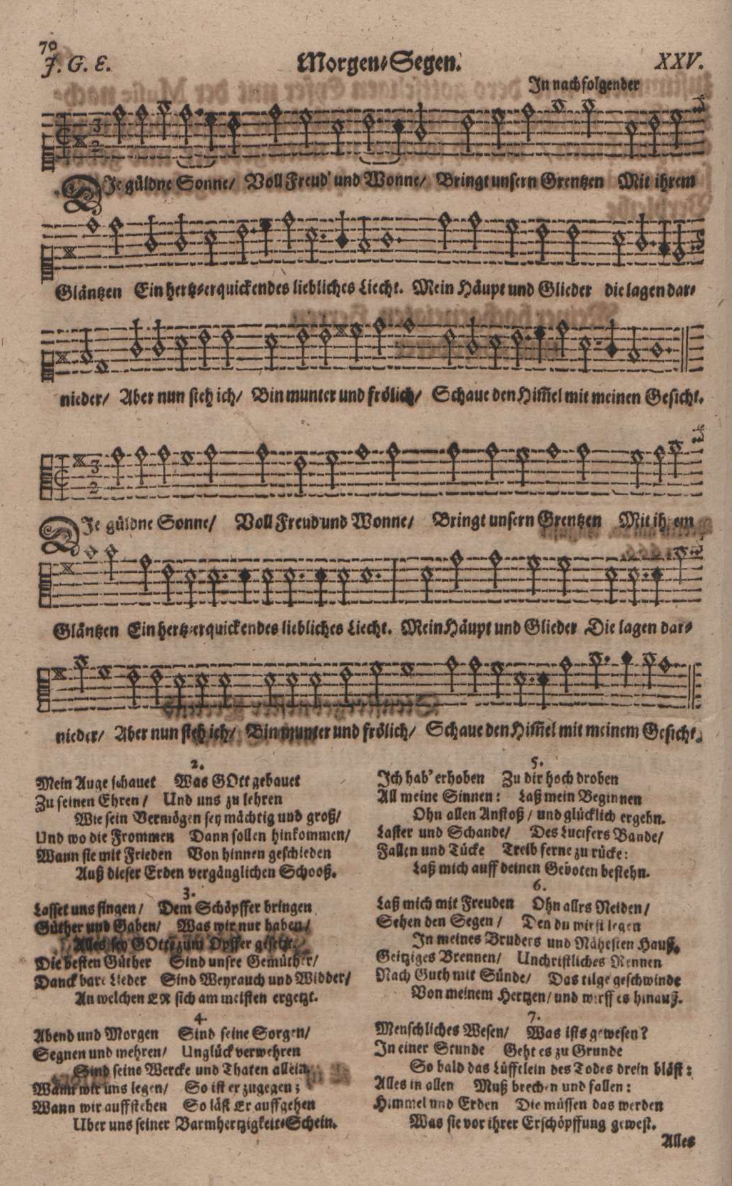
"Die güldne Sonne voll Freud und Wonne" in Pauli Gerhardi (Published 1666)

The year 1666 in music involved some significant events.

== Events ==
- The Accademia Filarmonica di Bologna is founded.
- King Charles II of England appoints Louis Grabu as Master of the King's Musick and a group of Italian musicians as the 'King's Italian Music'.
- Jean-Baptiste Boësset and Jean-Baptiste Lully end their musical collaboration, which has lasted since 1653.
- Antonio Stradivari makes the Ex Back violin.

== Classical music ==
- Giovanni Maria Bononcini – Primi frutti del giardino musicale, Op. 1 (10 trio sonatas da chiesa and five dances), published in Venice.
- Dieterich Buxtehude
  - Alles, was ihr tut mit Worten oder Werken, BuxWV 4
  - Benedicam Dominum, BuxWV 113
- Johann Georg Ebeling – Morgen-Segen: Die güldne Sonne voll Freud und Wonne
- John Playford -- Musick's Delight on the Cithren
- Heinrich Schutz
  - Matthäus-Passion, SWV 479
  - Johannes-Passion, SWV 481
- Jean-Baptiste Lully
  - Ballet des Muses, LWV 32
  - Le triomphe de Bacchus dans les Indes, LWV 30
- Pavel Josef Vejvanovský – Sonata a 5

== Opera ==
- Antonio Draghi – La Mascherata
- Carlo Pallavicino – Demetrio
- Antonio Sartorio – Seleuco

== Births ==
- January 5 – Antonio Lotti, composer (died 1740)
- April 6 – Angelo Michele Bartolotti, composer (died c. 1682)
- April 18 – Jean-Féry Rebel, violinist and composer (died 1747)
- April 25 – Johann Heinrich Buttstett, organist and composer (died 1727)
- August 20 – Alphonse d' Eve, composer and singer (died 1727)
- October – Nicolaus Vetter, organist and composer (died 1734)
- November 1 – James Sherard, apothecary and musician (died 1738)
- November 5 – Attilio Ariosti, composer (died 1729)
- November 25 – Giuseppe Giovanni Battista Guarneri, violin maker (died c.1740)
- December 5 – Francesco Scarlatti, composer (died 1741)
- date unknown
  - Carlo Francesco Cesarini, composer (died 1741)
  - Michelangelo Faggioli, composer (died 1733)
  - David Tecchler, luthier (died 1748)

== Deaths ==
- January 24 – Johann Andreas Herbst, composer and music theorist, 77
- February 24 – Nicholas Lanier, singer, composer and artist, 77
- May 6 – Paul Siefert, organist and composer, 79
- June 30 – Adam Krieger, German composer, 32
