= 1670 in music =

The year 1670 in music involved some significant events.

== Events ==
- June – Christian Geist joins the Swedish court orchestra under Gustaf Düben.
- October 14 – First performance of Molière's Le Bourgeois gentilhomme, a five-act comédie-ballet – a play intermingled with music, dance and singing – at the court of King Louis XIV of France.

== Publications ==
- Angelo Berardi – Discorsi musicali

== Classical music ==
- Angelo Berardi – Sinfonie a violino solo con basso continuo Libro primo, Op. 7
- Maurizio Cazzati – Op. 55, a collection of sonatas
- Jacques Champion de Chambonnières – Les Pieces de clavessin, Livre premier
- Marc-Antoine Charpentier – O pretiosum, O salutiferum, H.245
- Denis Gaultier – Pièces de luth sur trois différens modes nouveaux
- Giovanni Legrenzi – Acclamationi divote, Op.10
- Pavel Josef Vejvanovský – Baletti pro tabula in C major for 2 trumpets, organ, strings (CZ-KRa A 885)

== Opera ==
- Ludovico Busca – L'Ippolita, Reina delle Amazzoni

== Births ==
- January 24 – William Congreve, lyricist and librettist (died 1729)
- July 18 – Giovanni Bononcini, cellist and composer (died 1747)
- July 19 – Richard Leveridge, singer and composer (died 1758)
- September 9 – Andreas Armsdorff, composer (died 1699)
- date unknown
  - Julie d'Aubigny ("La Maupin"), opera singer (died 1707)
  - Pompeo Cannicciari, Italian composer (died 1744)
  - Henry Eccles, English composer (died 1742)
  - John Christian Jacobi, composer (died 1750)
  - Turlough O'Carolan, harpist (died 1738)
- probable
  - Antonio Caldara, composer (died 1736)
  - Johann Caspar Ferdinand Fischer, composer (died 1746)

== Deaths ==
- April 6 – Leonora Baroni, singer, musician and composer (born 1611)
- April 23 – Loreto Vittori, Italian castrato singer and composer (born c.1590)
- July 18 – Giuseppe Allevi, composer (born c. 1603)
- date unknown
  - François Du Fault, composer
  - Cornelis Thymenszoon Padbrué, composer (born c.1592)
