= 1672 in music =

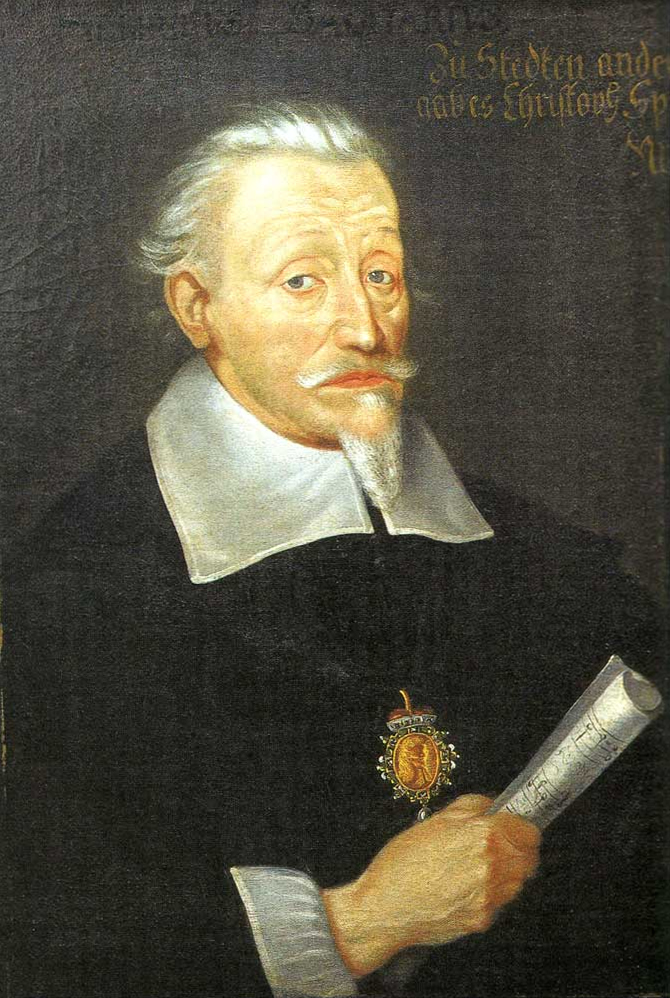
Heinrich Schütz

The year 1672 in music involved some significant events.

== Events ==
- March – Jean-Baptiste Lully quarrels with his regular collaborator, the playwright Molière, who brings in Marc-Antoine Charpentier to replace him.
- December 30 – John Banister begins Europe’s first major commercial public concert series at Whitefriars in the City of London.
- Arcangelo Corelli visits Paris, where he incurs the jealousy of Jean-Baptiste Lully.

== Publications ==
- New Court Songs
- Thomas Salmon – Observations upon a Late Book

== Classical music ==
- Dietrich Buxtehude – Auf stimmet die Saiten, BuxWV 116
- Marc-Antoine Charpentier
  - Messe pour les trépassés, H.2
  - Messe à 8 voix et 8 violons et flûtes, H.3
  - Messe à quatre choeurs, H.4
  - Te Deum, H.145
  - Symphonies pour un reposoir, H.515
- Jean-Baptiste Lully
  - Marche
  - Les folies d'Espagne
- Francesco Passarini – Compieta concertata..., Op. 3 (Bologna: Giacomo Monti)
- Heinrich Schütz – Matthäus-Passion
- Johann Sebastiani – Matthaus-Passion

== Opera ==
- Antonio Draghi – Gl'atomi d'Epicuro
- Juan Hidalgo de Polanco – La estatua de Prometeo
- Antonio Masini – Achille in Siro
- Giovanni Maria Pagliardi – Caligula delirante
- Antonio Sartorio – Adelaide

== Births ==
- January 16 – Francesco Mancini, composer (died 1737)
- March 21 – Stefano Benedetto Pallavicino, librettist for Agostino Steffani, Antonio Lotti and others (died 1742)
- April 6 – André-Cardinal Destouches, French composer of opera (died 1749)
- May 1 – Joseph Addison, English lyricist, essayist, and politician (died 1719)
- June 11 – Francesco Antonio Bonporti, priest and composer (died 1748)
- September 8 (baptized) – Nicolas de Grigny, organist (died 1703)
- November 6 – Carlo Agostino Badia, court composer (died 1738)
- December 21 – Benjamin Schmolck, hymn-writer (died 1737)
- date unknown – Carlo Agostino Badia, opera composer (died 1738)

== Deaths ==
- January – Denis Gaultier, lutenist and composer (born 1603)
- January 15 – John Cosin, English translator of "Veni Creator Spiritus" (born 1594)
- March 8 – Nicolaus Hasse, composer (born c. 1617)
- June 17 – Orazio Benevoli, composer (born 1605)
- July 13 – Henry Cooke, actor, singer and composer (born 1616)
- August 9 – José Ximénez, organist and composer (born 1601)
- September 16 – Anne Bradstreet, lyricist/poet (born 1612)
- November 6 – Heinrich Schütz, composer (born 1585)
- December 17 – Giovanni Antonio Boretti, composer
- date unknown
  - Jacques Champion de Chambonnières, French harpsichordist and composer (born c.1601)
  - Valentino Siani, Italian violin-maker (born c. 1595)
- probable – François Dufault, lutenist and composer (born c.1604)
