= Johann Heinrich Schmelzer =

Austrian composer and violinist

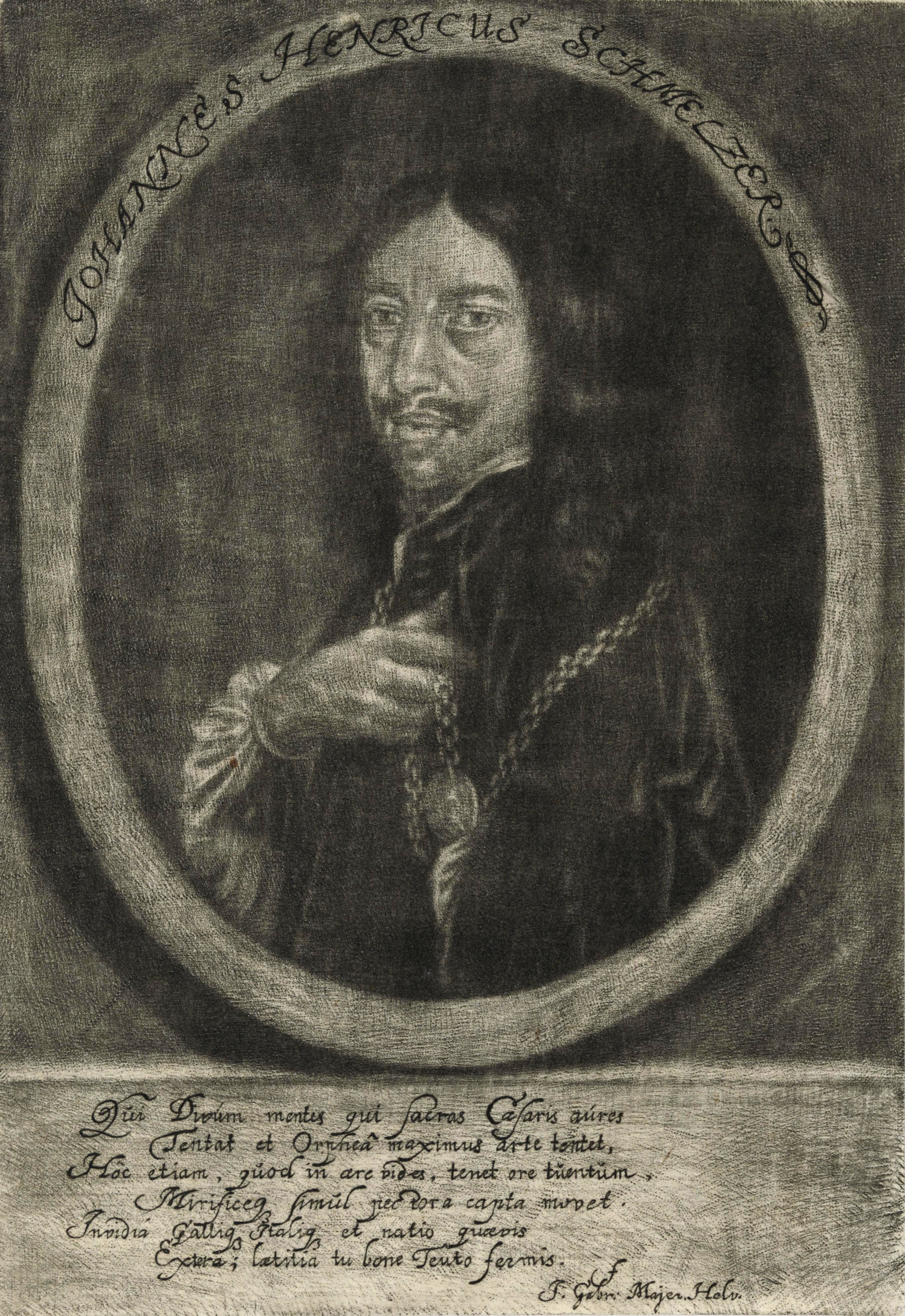
Portrait of Johann Heinrich Schmelzer

Johann Heinrich Schmelzer (c. 1620–1623 – between 29 February and 20 March 1680) was an Austrian composer and violinist of the middle Baroque era. Almost nothing is known about his early years, but he seems to have arrived in Vienna during the 1630s, and remained composer and musician at the Habsburg court for the rest of his life. He enjoyed a close relationship with Emperor Leopold I, was ennobled by him, and rose to the rank of Kapellmeister in 1679. He died during a plague epidemic only months after getting the position.

Schmelzer was one of the most important violinists of the period, and an important influence on later German and Austrian composers for violin. He made substantial contributions to the development of violin technique and promoted the use and development of sonata and suite forms in Austria and South Germany. He was the leading Austrian composer of his generation, and an influence on Heinrich Ignaz Biber.

== Biography ==
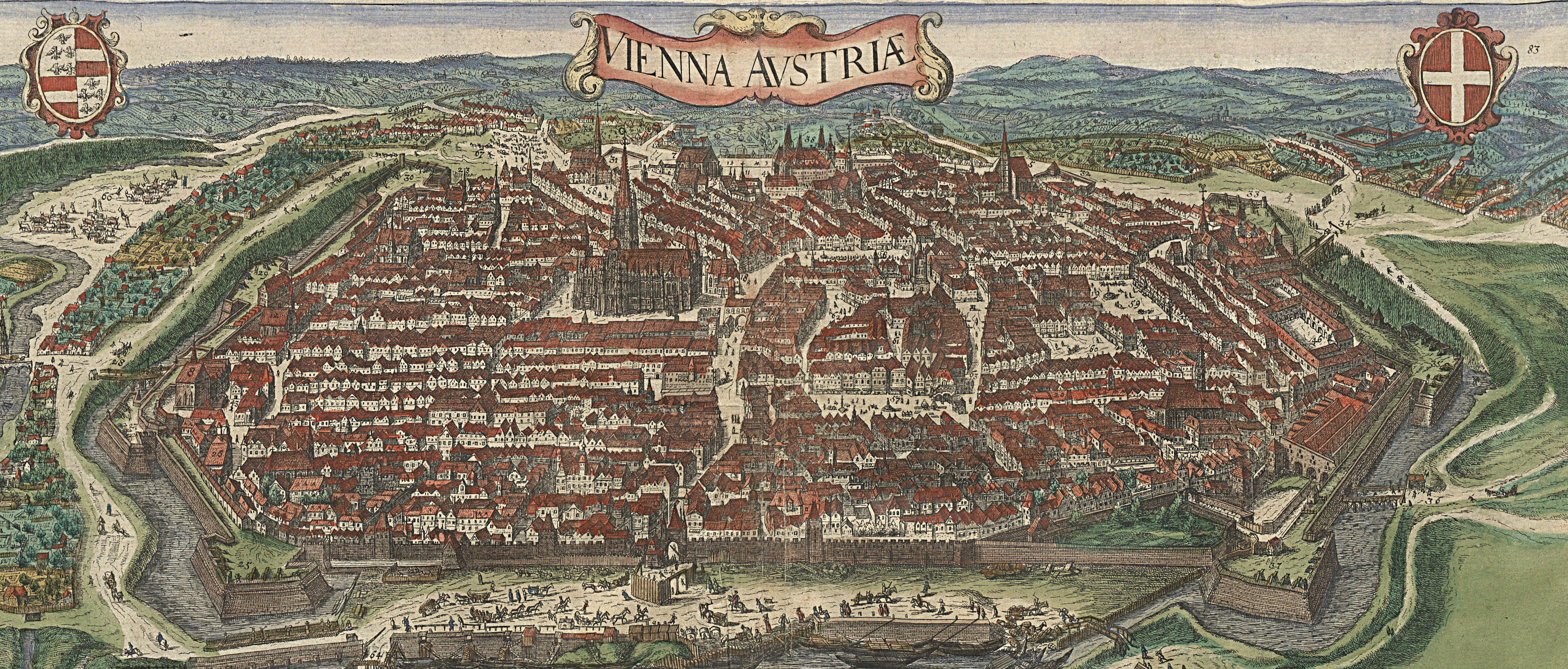
Vienna in 1609, drawn in 1609 by Jacob Hoefnagel and recolored in 1640 by Claes Jansz Visscher

Schmelzer was born in Scheibbs, Lower Austria. Nothing is known about his early years, and most of the surviving information about his background was recounted by the composer himself in his petition for ennoblement of 1673. He described his father as a soldier, but in another document, the 1645 marriage certificate of Schmelzer's sister Eva Rosina, he is listed as a baker. Schmelzer does not mention his father's name, but Eva Rosina's marriage certificate does: Daniel Schmelzer. At any rate, it remains unclear where and from whom Schmelzer received primary music education. His activities before 1643 are similarly unknown–the composer is first mentioned in a document dated 28 June 1643, relating to his first marriage. He is referred to as an instrumental musician at St. Stephen's Cathedral (Stephansdom), Vienna. The date of his arrival to Vienna is unknown, but he probably worked at the court chapel in the late 1630s, in the employ of Ferdinand II and, after 1637, Ferdinand III. Schmelzer's colleagues at the chapel included such distinguished composers as Johann Jakob Froberger, Giovanni Valentini, and Antonio Bertali.

Schmelzer was officially appointed court violinist in 1649. Our knowledge of his position, duties, and activities is incomplete. He apparently rose to prominence as a violin virtuoso, as well as a composer, and enjoyed a close relationship with Emperor Leopold I, who was a well-known patron of the arts and a composer himself. Schmelzer started publishing his music in 1659. He was appointed vice-Kapellmeister on 13 April 1671. On 14 June 1673, after the composer petitioned for ennoblement, the Emperor raised Schmelzer to the ranks of nobility; Schmelzer now added von Ehrenruef to his name. Eventually, after his predecessor Giovanni Felice Sances had died, Schmelzer became Kapellmeister, on 1 October 1679. Unfortunately, he fell victim of the plague early in 1680, and died in Prague, where the Viennese court moved in an attempt to evade the epidemic.

Four of his children are known: Andreas Anton Schmelzer (26 November 1653 – 13 October 1701), a composer; Peter Clemens Schmelzer (28 June 1672 – 20 September 1746), a lesser composer; Franz Heinrich Schmelzer (born 27 June 1678), a Jesuit priest; and George Joseph Schmelzer (dates unknown).

== Music ==
Schmelzer attained a high reputation in a field (violin playing and violin composition) which at the time was dominated by Italians; indeed, one traveler referred to him in 1660 as "the famous and nearly most distinguished violinist in all Europe". Schmelzer's Sonatae unarum fidium of 1664 was the first collection of sonatas for violin and basso continuo to be published by a German-speaking composer. It contains the brilliant virtuosity, sectional structure, and lengthy ground-bass variations typical of the mid-Baroque violin sonata.

Schmelzer was the foremost Austrian composer of instrumental music of his day, and had an important influence on the Austrian violinist and composer Heinrich Ignaz Franz Biber (1644–1704), who is believed to have been one of Schmelzer's students.

== Selected works ==
- Lamento sopra la morte di Ferdinando III, 1657
- Duodena selactarum sonatarum, 1659
- Sacroprofanus concentus, 1662
- Sonatae unarum fidium seu a violino solo, 1664
- Die musikalische Fechtschul, 1668
- 150 suites, vocal works, and Christian music

== Sacred music ==
- Ad cocentus o mortales ad triumphos – SSATTB, 2 violins, 3 violas, 2 cornetts, 2 clarini, 4 trombones, violone, bc
- Compieta – SATB, 2 violins, vc, cornetts, 2 trombones, violone, bsn, bc:
  - "Cum Invocarem"
  - "In te Domine"
  - "Qui habitat in adjutorio"
  - "Ecce nunc benedicite"
  - "Te lucis ante terminum"
  - "Nunc dimittis"
- Currite, accurrite, caeli et terra – SATB, 2 violins, 3 violas, violone, bc
- Die Stärke der Liebe (Sepolcro)- SSATT, 2 violins, bc
- Hodie lux tua, sancti fulgebit – SATB, 2 violins, 3 violas, violone, bc
- Inquietum est cor meum – SATB, 2 violins, 2 violas, violone, bc
- Le memorie dolorose – SSATTTBB, 2 violins, 4 violas, 2 gamba, bc
- Missa Dei patris benedicte – SSAATTBB, 5 violas, 2 clarini, 3 trombones, violone, bc
- Missa Jesu crusifixi – SSAATTBB, 2 violins, 4 violas, 2 clarini, violone, bc
- Missa Mater purissima – SATB, 3 violas, cornetts, 3 trombones, violone, bc
- Missa Natalis (Kyrie & Gloria) – SSATTB, 2 violins, 2 violas, 2 clarini, 4 trombones, violone, bc
- Missa Peregrina in honorem Sancti Rochi – SATB, 3 violas, 2 cornetts, 3 trombones, violone, bc
- Missa pro defunctis (Kyrie, Sanctus & Agnus) – SATB, 3 violas, bc
- Missa Sancti Joannis – SATB, 2 violins, 2 violas, 3 trombones, violone, bc
- Missa Sancti Spiritus – SSATTB, 2 violins, 2 violas, 2 cornetts, 2 clarini, 4 trombones, bc
- Missa Sancti Stanislai – SATB, 2 violins, 3 violas, bc
- Missa Tarde venientium in honorem Sancti Wenceslai – SATB, 2 violins, cornett/trombone, violone, bc
- Nos autem gloriari – SATB, 3 violas, vc, violone, bc
- O Jesu summa charitas – SATB, 2 violins, 2 violas, theorbo, bc
- Sileat misericordiam tuam, o bone Jesu – SATB, violin, 3 violas, violone, bc
- Terra triumphans jubila – SATB, 2 violins, gamba, violone, bc
- Vesperae brivissimae de beatissimae virgine et de apostolis – SATB, 2 violins, vc, cornetts, 2 trombones, bsn, bc
  - "Dixit Dominus"
  - "Laudate pueri"
  - "Laetatus sum"
  - "Nisi Dominus"
  - "Lauda Jerusalem"
  - "Credidi"
  - "In convertendo"
  - "Domine probabasti me"
  - "Magnificat"
- Vesperae solemnis pleno coro – SSAATTBB, 2 violins, 5 violas, 2 cornetts, 2 clarini, 3 trombones, violone, bc
