= Antonio Bertali =

Italian composer

Antonio Bertali (March 1605–17 April 1669) was an Italian composer and violinist of the Baroque era.

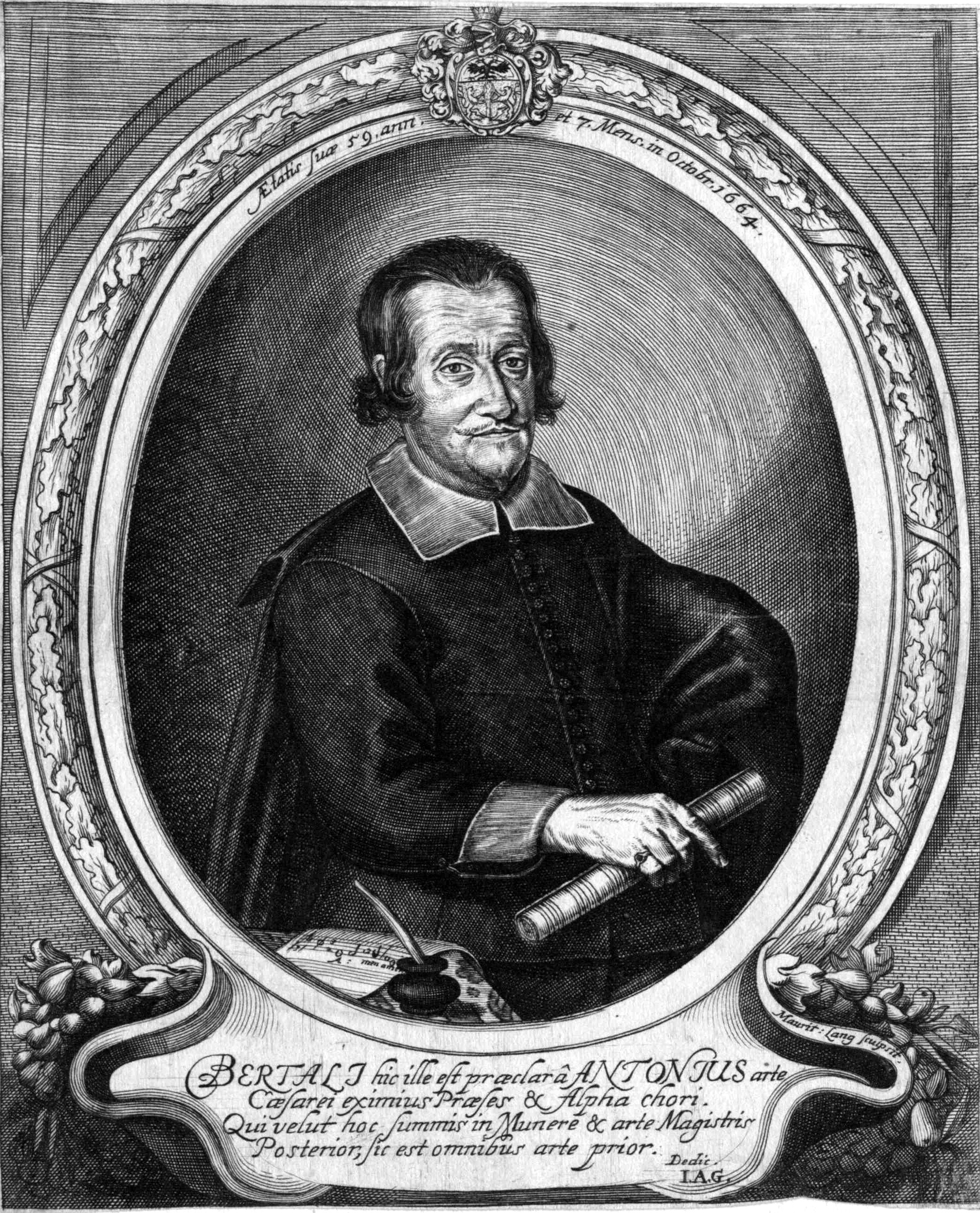
Engraved portrait of Antonio Bertali at the age of 59 in 1664.

He was born in Verona and received early music education there from Stefano Bernardi. Probably from 1624, he was employed as court musician in Vienna by Emperor Ferdinand II. In 1649, Bertali succeeded Giovanni Valentini as court Kapellmeister. He died in Vienna in 1669 and was succeeded in his post by Giovanni Felice Sances.

Bertali's compositions are in the manner of other northern Italian composers of the time and include operas, oratorios, a large number of liturgical works, and chamber music. Particularly his operas are notable for establishing the tradition of Italian opera seria in Vienna. Approximately half of his work is now lost; copies survive made by Bertali's contemporary, Pavel Josef Vejvanovský, some of the pieces are currently in possession of Vienna's Hofbibliothek, the library of the Kremsmünster Abbey and the Kroměříž archive. The most important source for Bertali's work is, however, the Viennese Distinta Specificatione catalogue, which lists several composers of the Habsburg court and provides titles and scoring for more than two thousand compositions.

The "Chaconne" or Ciaccona is perhaps his best-known work.
