= Maurizio Cazzati =

Italian composer

Maurizio Cazzati (1 March 1616 – 28 September 1678) was a northern Italian composer of the seventeenth century.

== Biography ==
Cazzati was born in Luzzara in the Duchy of Mantua. Though almost unknown today, during his lifetime he served as a successful music director in many cities near his birthplace, including Mantua, Bozzolo, Ferrara and Bergamo, where he was succeeded by Pietro Andrea Ziani. He was so well-thought-of that in 1657 he was invited to take the position of maestro di cappella of San Petronio Basilica in Bologna, without needing to apply for it. Immediately after his appointment, he made some radical reforms that won him general hostility from the musical community, and led to personal conflicts with other members of the cappella. In particular, he was bitterly criticized by Lorenzo Perti (the uncle of Giacomo Antonio Perti) and Giulio Cesare Arresti, who questioned his capability as maestro. Likely, as Cazzati later declared, they were just jealous of his position. In 1671, he left this position and returned to Mantua, where he served the Duchess Isabella as Maestro di Cappella da Camera until his death. While being only a small portion of his enormous printed output (66 printed volumes), his instrumental music is nowadays considered the most important and influential part. His op. 35 (1665) contains the first known example of a trumpet sonata.
