= 1644 in music =

List of years in music	(table)
- … 1634; 1635; 1636; 1637; 1638; 1639; 1640; 1641; 1642; 1643; 1644; 1645; 1646; 1647; 1648; 1649; 1650; 1651; 1652; 1653; 1654 …
- Art; Archaeology; Architecture; Literature; Music; Philosophy; Science; +...

The year 1644 in music involved some significant events and new musical works.

== Events ==
- 21 June – Future Dean of Salisbury Thomas Pierce graduates M.A. from Magdalen College, Oxford, where he is noted as a "musician and poet".
- date unknown – Pieter and François Hemony cast the world's first tuned carillon, which is installed in Zutphen's Wijnhuistoren.

== Publications ==
- Johannes Eccard & Johann Stobaeus – Part 2 of Der Preussischen Fest-Lieder: Von Ostern an biß Advent (The Prussian Feast-day Songs: from Easter to Advent) for five, six, seven, and eight voices (Königsberg: Johann Reusnern)

== Classical music ==
- Nicolaus à Kempis – Symphoniae, vol. 1
- Bonaventura Rubino – Vespro dello Stellario
- Barbara Strozzi – Il primo libro di madrigali

== Opera ==
- Francesco Sacrati – La finta pazza
- Sigmund Theophil Staden – Seelewig, the first German singspiel
- Francesco Cavalli – La Deidamia and L'Ormindo

== Births ==
- January 14 – Thomas Britton, English concert promoter (died 1714)
- August 12 – Heinrich Ignaz Franz Biber, German composer of sonatas (died 1704)
- December 23 – Tomás de Torrejón y Velasco, Peruvian organist and composer (died 1728)
- date unknown
  - Maria Cattarina Calegari, Italian composer, singer, organist, and nun (died after 1675)
  - Václav Karel Holan Rovenský, Czech organist and composer (died 1718)
- probable
  - Ignazio Albertini, Italian violinist and composer (died 1685)
  - Giovanni Battista Vitali, Italian composer of sonatas (died 1692)

== Deaths ==
- Robert Ramsey, British organist and composer (born 1590s)
