= 1649 in music =

List of years in music	(table)
- … 1639; 1640; 1641; 1642; 1643; 1644; 1645; 1646; 1647; 1648; 1649; 1650; 1651; 1652; 1653; 1654; 1655; 1656; 1657; 1658; 1659 …
- Art; Archaeology; Architecture; Literature; Music; Philosophy; Science; +...

The year 1649 in music involved some significant events.

== Popular music ==
- Gerrard Winstanley – "Diggers' Song"

== Classical music ==
- Melchior Franck – Davidischer Traur- und Trostgesang for three voices (Coburg: Johann Eyrich), a funeral motet, published posthumously
- Johann Jakob Froberger – Libro secondo di toccate, fantasie, canzone, allemande, courante, sarabande, gigue et altre partite (presentation manuscript, September)
- Alberich Mazak – Cultus harmonicus, volume one, a collection of his complete works, published in Vienna

== Opera ==
- Pietro Cavalli – Jason
- Antonio Cesti – Orontea, premiered at the Teatro Santissimi Apostoli, in Venice, during Carnivale.

== Births ==
- February 23 – John Blow, organist and composer
- May 3 (bapt.) – Johann Valentin Meder, organist and composer (d. 1719)
- date unknown – Johann Krieger, composer
  - John Blow, organist and composer
- probable – Jacques Boyvin, French organist and composer (died 1706)

== Deaths ==
- April 29/30 – Giovanni Valentini, keyboard virtuoso and composer.
