= 1653 in music =

List of years in music	(table)
- … 1643; 1644; 1645; 1646; 1647; 1648; 1649; 1650; 1651; 1652; 1653; 1654; 1655; 1656; 1657; 1658; 1659; 1660; 1661; 1662; 1663 …
- Art; Archaeology; Architecture; Literature; Music; Philosophy; Science; +...

The year 1653 in music involved some significant events.

== Events ==
- The Ballet Royal de la Nuit premieres on 23 February, at the Salle du Petit-Bourbon in Paris.
- Madeleine de Scudéry and her friend, the lutenist Mlle Bocquet, launch a salon.
- Jean-Baptiste Boësset and Jean-Baptiste Lully start their collaboration to produce ballets de cour (to 1666).
- The Bavarian State Opera opera company is founded under Princess Henriette Adelaide of Savoy, performing Giovanni Battista Maccioni's L'arpa festante in the court theatre.

== Classical music ==
=== Opera ===
- Antonio Maria Abbatini – Dal male il bene
- Antonio Bertali – L'inganno d'amore
- Charles Coypeau d'Assoucy – Andromède

== Publications ==
- Alberich Mazak – Cultus harmonicus, volume three, a collection of his complete works, published in Vienna

== Births ==
- February 12 – Giovanni Francesco Grossi, Italian singer (died 1697)
- February 17 – Arcangelo Corelli, Italian composer and violinist (died 1713)
- June 1 – Georg Muffat, composer (died 1704)
- September 1 (baptized) – Johann Pachelbel, German organist and composer (died 1706)

== Deaths ==
- January 14 – George Rudolf of Liegnitz, patron of the arts and amateur composer (born 1595)
- February 16 – Johannes Schultz, composer (born 1582)
- February 23 – Luigi Rossi, Italian composer of cantatas (born 1597)
- March 24 – Samuel Scheidt, German organist and composer (born 1587)
