= 1646 in music =

List of years in music	(table)
- … 1636; 1637; 1638; 1639; 1640; 1641; 1642; 1643; 1644; 1645; 1646; 1647; 1648; 1649; 1650; 1651; 1652; 1653; 1654; 1655; 1656 …
- Art; Archaeology; Architecture; Literature; Music; Philosophy; Science; +...

Musical events of the year 1646 in music:

== Events ==
- Luigi Rossi is invited to Paris by Cardinal Mazarin.

== Classical music ==
- Giovanni Battista Granata – Caprici armonici sopra la chittarriglia spagnuola..., a collection of music for the treble guitar, published in Bologna.
- Andreas Hammerschmidt – Part IV of the Musicalische Andachten

== Opera ==
- Francesco Cavalli – La prosperità infelice di Giulio Cesare dittatore (lost), with libretto by Giovanni Francesco Busenello
- Giacinto Andrea Cicognini – Il Celio

== Births ==
- July 29 – Johann Theile, composer (died 1724)
- date unknown – Juan de Araujo, musician and composer (died 1712)

== Deaths ==
- September 11 – Johann Stobäus, composer (born 1580)
- September 24 – Duarte Lobo, composer (born c. 1545)
- October 3 – Virgilio Mazzocchi, Italian composer of sacred vocal music (born 1597)
- date unknown – Wojciech Dębołęcki, writer and composer (born 1585)
  - Manuel Machado, Portuguese harpist and composer of cantigas and romances
  - Johann Vierdanck, German composer, violinist and cornetist (buried 1 April) (b. 1605)
