= 1642 in music =

| List of years in music | (table) |
- … 1632; 1633; 1634; 1635; 1636; 1637; 1638; 1639; 1640; 1641; 1642; 1643; 1644; 1645; 1646; 1647; 1648; 1649; 1650; 1651; 1652 …
- Art; Archaeology; Architecture; Literature; Music; Philosophy; Science; +...

The year 1642 in music involved some significant events.

== Events ==
- Bartolomeo Montalbano becomes Kapellmeister at San Francesco in Bologna.

== Publications ==
- Christoph Demantius – Morgenröthe for five voices (Freiberg: Georg Beuther), written for the funeral of Hedwig on May 30
- Johannes Eccard & Johann Stobaeus – Part 1 of Der Preussischen Fest-Lieder/ vom Advent an biß Ostern (The Prussian Feast-day Songs: From Advent to Easter) for five, six, and eight voices (Elbing: Wendel Bodenhausen)
- Claudio Monteverdi – Selva morale e spirituale
- Nicodemo Parisi – Messa e salmi concertati a 5 voci facili da cantarsi... (Venice: Bartolomeo Magni), collected by his brother, Filippo Parisi, and including two of his compositions
- Johann Rist – Des Daphnis aus Cimbrien Galathee (Hamburg: Jacob Rebenlein), a collection of pastoral songs, music by Heinrich Pape

== Popular music ==
- Jean de Brébeuf – "Huron Carol" (Canada's oldest Christmas song)

== Classical music ==
- Cornelis Padbrué – Synphonia in nuptias..., written for the wedding of Mathaeus Steyn and Maria van Napels

== Opera ==
- Francesco Cavalli – Amore innamorato
- Claudio Monteverdi – L'incoronazione di Poppea
- Luigi Rossi – Il Palazzo incantato

== Births ==
- 11 January – Johann Friedrich Alberti, German composer and organist
- 23 September – Giovanni Maria Bononcini, Italian composer (died 1678)
- 6 December – Johann Christoph Bach, composer (died 1703)
- date unknown – Benedictus Buns, Dutch composer

== Deaths ==
- date unknown
  - Giovanni Battista Buonamente, Italian composer and violinist (born c.1595)
  - Johann Daniel Mylius, composer for the lute (born c.1583)
- probable – Nicolas Vallet, lutenist and composer (born c.1583)
