= 1654 in music =

List of years in music	(table)
- … 1644; 1645; 1646; 1647; 1648; 1649; 1650; 1651; 1652; 1653; 1654; 1655; 1656; 1657; 1658; 1659; 1660; 1661; 1662; 1663; 1664 …
- Art; Archaeology; Architecture; Literature; Music; Philosophy; Science; +...

The year 1654 in music involved some significant events.

== Events ==
- April 21 – Francisco Lopez Capillas becomes chapelmaster of Mexico City Cathedral.
- Georg Caspar Wecker becomes organist of the Frauenkirche in Nuremberg.
- The newly formed Innsbruck opera company open's with Antonio Cesti's Cleopatra
- Violin maker Giuseppe Giovanni Battista Guarneri opens a workshop in Cremona.

== Publications ==
- Jacob van Eyck – Der Fluyten Lust-hof (4th edition)

== Classical music ==
- Louis Couperin – Fugue Grave sur Urbs Beata Jherusalem

== Opera ==
- Antonio Maria Abbatini – Del male in bene
- Francesco Cavalli
  - Ciro
  - Xerse, January 12 at the Teatro SS Giovanni e Paolo in Venice
- Antonio Cesti – Cleopatra, with libretto by Dario Varotari the Younger, Innsbruck, date unknown.
- Francesco Provenzale – Teseo

== Births ==
- February 3 – Pietro Antonio Fiocco, composer (died 1714)
- July 25 – Agostino Steffani, bishop, diplomat and composer (died 1728)
- September – Vincent Lübeck, organist and composer (died 1740)
- October 23 – Johann Bernhard Staudt, composer (died 1712)
- date unknown
  - Étienne Loulié, French musician, teacher and music theorist (died 1702)
  - Count Ludovico Roncalli, composer for guitar (died 1713)
- probable – Servaes de Koninck, composer (died c.1701)

== Deaths ==
- February 19 – Edmund Chilmead, writer, translator and musician (born 1610)
- March 24 – Samuel Scheidt, organist and composer (born 1587)
- date unknown – Francisco Correa de Arauxo, organist and composer (born 1584)
- probable – Julius Ernst Rautenstein, composer (born c.1590)
