= 1714 in music =

The year 1714 in music involved some significant events.

== Events ==
- March 2 – Johann Sebastian Bach is appointed Konzertmeister at Weimar, having declined a post at Halle.
- A school of dance opens at the Paris Opera.
- Michel Richard Delalande assumes full control of the French royal chapel upon the retirement of his last co-sous maîtres.
- Francesco Geminiani arrives in London, where he obtains the patronage of William Capell, 3rd Earl of Essex.
- Melchior Hoffmann, composer, marries Margaretha Elisabeth Philipp; he is already suffering from a terminal illness.
- Domenico Scarlatti becomes maestro di cappella at the Cappella Giulia in the Vatican.
- Francesco Maria Veracini visits London and performs at the Queen's Theatre.
- The first permanent church organ in the United States, the Brattle organ, imported by Thomas Brattle, is installed in Boston at King's Chapel.
- John Tufts publishes the first instructional book for singing in the USA.
- Gottfried Silbermann completes the new organ for Freiberg Cathedral.

== Classical music ==
- Pirro Capacelli Conte Albergati – Cantate et oratorii spirituali, Op. 10
- William Babell – Prelude in G major from the Frontispiece
- Johann Sebastian Bach
  - Weinen, Klagen, Sorgen, Zagen, BWV 12 (movement 2 would later form the Crucifixus movement of his Mass in B minor)
  - Widerstehe doch der Sünde, BWV 54
  - Herr Christ, der einge Gottessohn, BWV Anh. 55
  - Nun komm, der Heiden Heiland, BWV 61
  - Christen, ätzet diesen Tag, BWV 63
  - Tritt auf die Glaubensbahn, BWV 152
  - Erschallet, ihr Lieder, BWV 172
  - Himmelskönig, sei willkommen, BWV 182
  - Mein Herze schwimmt im Blut, BWV 199
  - Kleines harmonisches Labyrinth, BWV 591 (Now attributed to Johann David Heinichen)
  - Organ Concerto in E-flat major, BWV 597
  - The Little Organ Book
    - Nun komm' der Heiden Heiland, BWV 599
    - Gott, durch deine Güte, BWV 600
    - Lob sei dem allmächtigen Gott, BWV 602
    - Gelobet seist du, Jesu Christ, BWV 604
    - Vom Himmel kam der Engel Schaar, BWV 607
    - Wer nur den lieben Gott lässt walten, BWV 642
    - Alle Menschen müssen sterben, BWV 643
  - Toccata in C minor, BWV 911
  - Toccata in G major, BWV 916
  - Fantasia and Fugue in A minor, BWV 944
  - Aria variata in A minor, BWV 989
  - Violin Sonata in E minor, BWV 1023
- Antonio Caldara – Laboravi in gemitu meo
- André Campra – Enée et Didon
- Giovanni Maria Casini – Pensieri per Organo
- Arcangelo Corelli
  - Christmas Concerto
  - Twelve concerti grossi, Op. 6, published posthumously
- François Couperin – Leçons de ténèbres
- Henri Desmarets – Grands Motets
- Christoph Graupner – Mir hat die Welt trüglich gericht, GWV 1103/14
- George Frideric Handel – Te Deum in D major, HWV 278
- Johann Ernst Prinz von Sachsen-Weimar – Violin Concerto in G major
- Reinhard Keiser – Musicalische Land-Lust
- Jean-Baptiste Loeillet – 12 Recorder Sonatas, Op. 2
- Johann Mattheson – Harmonisches Denckmahl (12 Harpsichord suites)
- Santiago de Murcia – Resumen de acompañar la parte con la guitarra
- James Paisible – The Godolphin. Mr. Isaac's new dance, made for Her Majesty's Birth Day, 1714...
- André Raison – Deuxième livre d'orgue
- Jean-Féry Rebel – Les caractères de la danse
- Alessandro Scarlatti – S. Filippo Neri (oratorio)
- Jean-Baptiste Stuck – Héraclite et Démocrite
- Franz Mathias Techelmann – Toccate, Canzoni, Ricercari et altre Galanterie
- Georg Philipp Telemann – Nun komm der Heiden Heiland, TWV 1:1175
- Giuseppe Valentini – 12 Allettamenti da Camera, Op. 8

== Opera ==
- Leonardo Leo – Pisistrato
- Jean-Baptiste Matho – Arion (tragédie en musique)
- Jean-Joseph Mouret
  - Les Amours de Ragonde
  - Les Fêtes ou Le Triomphe de Thalie
- Nicola Porpora – Arianna e Teseo
- Alessandro Scarlatti – L’amor generoso
- Antonio Vivaldi – Orlando finto pazzo, RV 727

== Births ==
- January 1 – Giovanni Battista Mancini, soprano castrato, voice teacher (died 1800)
- February – Susannah Maria Cibber, singer and actress, daughter of Thomas Arne (died 1766)
- February 2 – Gottfried August Homilius, composer, cantor and organist (died 1785)
- February 28 – Gioacchino Conti, soprano castrato opera singer (died 1761)
- March 8 – Carl Philipp Emanuel Bach (died 1788)
- April 16 – Pedro António Avondano, Portuguese composer
- May 6 – Anton Raaff, tenor (died 1797)
- May 12 – Johan Daniel Berlin composer (died 1787)
- July 2 – Christoph Willibald Gluck (died 1787)
- September 10 – Niccolò Jommelli, composer (died 1774)
- December 23 – Ranieri de' Calzabigi, librettist collaborating with Gluck (died 1795)
- date unknown
  - Antonio Besozzi, Italian oboist and composer (died 1781)
  - Abade António da Costa, Portuguese composer (died 1780)
  - Johan Foltmar, composer (died 1794)
  - Christian Gottlob Hubert, builder of keyboard instruments (died 1793)
  - Edmund Pascha, organist and composer (died 1772)
- probable – Carlo Ferdinando Landolfi, luthier (died 1771)

== Deaths ==
- January 4 – Atto Melani, opera singer (born 1626)
- April 17 – Philipp Heinrich Erlebach, composer (born 1657)
- August 25 – Johann Georg Kühnhausen, composer (date of birth unknown)
- September 3 – Pietro Antonio Fiocco, composer (born 1654)
- November 13 – Guillaume-Gabriel Nivers, organist (born 1632)
- date unknown – Benito Bello de Torices, Spanish composer, maestro at the Convent of Las Descalzas Reales (born c.1660)
