= Mario Capuana =

Italian composer

Mario Capuana (1576 in Sicily – 4 May 1647 in Noto) was an Italian composer of motets and a requiem.

He was maestro di capella at the Cathedral of Noto in the Province of Syracuse from 1628 to his death in 1647. In the years before and immediately after his death were published a small flurry of works in Venice.

== Editions ==
- Messa da requiem a 4 (Venice, posthumous 1650) – edited with Requiem (1653) of Bonaventura Rubino. 1999. A copy is preserved in the Archive of the Sing-Akademie Zu Berlin, complete with needlessly disparaging comments in the handwriting of Carl Friedrich Zelter.
- Sacro Armonie a tre voci con Basso Continuo por sonar il Clavicembalo ò altro Stromento di Mario Capuana Maestro di Capella.
- Mario Capuana Motetti concertati a due, tre, quattro e cinque voci (1649) edition 1998. – This is one of the series of Renaissance Sicilian composers including Claudio Pari, Pietro Vinci, Antonio Il Verso, Antonio Formica, Tommaso Giglio, Anselmo Fazio, Giovan Pietro Flaccomio, Erasmo Marotta, Sigismondo d'India, Giandomenico Martoretta, Cataldo Amodei, Bartolomeo Montalbano, Bonaventura Rubino, and Vincenzo Gallo.

== Recordings ==
- Parce mihi, Domine. on Fabellae Sacrae by Savadi. Pan 2008.
- Messa di defonti a quattro voci (1650). on REQUIEM – Mario Capuana – Bonaventura Rubino – Choeur de Chambre de Namur – conduct. Leonardo García Alarcón. Ricercar- 2014 (RIC 353)
