= Ensemble Elyma =

Ensemble Elyma is an early music ensemble specialising in the baroque musical heritage of Latin America, led by Gabriel Garrido.

== Selected discography ==
See Discography

- 1991 Sigismondo d'India Arie, madrigali e baletti María Cristina Kiehr, Nadia Ragni, Claudio Cavina, Josep Cabré, Daniele Carnovich. Tactus Records, Italy.
- 1992 Il secolo d'Oro nel nuovo mondo - Diego José de Salazar, D. Fernandes, Juan de Sucre, Juan Hidalgo de Polanco, Francisco de Peñalosa, Gaspar Fernandes, Antonio de Ávila, Hernando Franco, Fray Geronimo Gonzales, Juan Gutiérrez de Padilla, Juan García de Zéspedes, Tomás de Torrejón y Velasco, Juan de Araujo. María Cristina Kiehr, Adriana Fernandez, Sandro Naglia, Pietro Valguarnera. Symphonia (record label) Italy. Diapason d'or, Dix de repertoire. (re-released as Hanacpachap Pan Classics 2012)
- 1992 Lima - La Plata - Missions Jésuites. Les Chemins du Baroque vol. 1, ref. K617 025 Ensemble Elyma, Coro de Niños Cantores de Cordoba (Argentine), María Cristina Kiehr, Adriana Fernandez, Roberta Invernizzi, Claudio Cavina, Victor Torres.
- 1992 Domenico Zipoli Vêpres de San Ignacio - Réductions jésuites de Chiquitos. Les Chemins du Baroque, vol. 4, K617 027 Ensemble Elyma, Coro de Niños Cantores de Cordoba, Argentina, Adriana Fernandez, Silvia Perez Monsalve, Claudio Cavina, Josep Benet, Victor Torres.
- 1993 Torrejón y Velasco Musique à la Cité des Rois Les Chemins du baroque vol. 5, K617 035
- 1993 Domenico Zipoli Zipoli L'Américain Les Chemins du Baroque, vol.6, K617 036
- 1993 Domenico Zipoli Zipoli L'Européen Les Chemins du Baroque, vol.7, K617 037
- 1994 Juan de Araujo L'Or et l'Argent du Haut-Pérou Les Chemins du Baroque, vol.8, K617 038
- 1994 Bonaventura Rubino: Vespro per lo Stellario della beata Vergine
- 1995 Marco da Gagliano: La Dafne K617 058
- 1996 Monteverdi: L'Orfeo K617 066
- 1996 Musique baroque à la royale Audience de Charcas - Araujo, Antonio Durán de la Motta, Blas Tardío y Guzmán, Roque Jacinto de Chavarría, Flores. K617 064
- 1996 Domenico Zipoli: San Ignacio, l'Opéra perdu des missions jésuites de l'Amazonie.
- 1997 Gerusalemme Liberata - Monteverdi: Il combattimento di Tancredi e Clorinda, madrigals by Giaches de Wert, Sigismondo d'India, Biagio Marini, Domenico Mazzochi. K617 076
- 1998 Girard de Beaulieu: Balet Comique de la Royne 1581, texts by Balthasar de Beaujoyeulx. K617 080.
- 1998 Roque Ceruti: Vêpres solennelles de Saint Jean Baptiste K617 089
- 1998 Monteverdi: Il ritorno d'Ulisse in patria K617 091/3
- 1999 Monteverdi: Vespro della Beata Vergine 1610 K617 100/2
- 2000 Le Phénix du Mexique - villancicos to texts by Juana Inés de la Cruz. K617 106
- 2000 Tomás de Torrejón y Velasco: La Púrpura de la Rosa
- 2000 Monteverdi: L'Incoronazione di Poppea. K617 110/3
- 2001 Anon. Mission - San Francisco Xavier. Opera and mass. K617 111
- 2002 Bonaventura Aliotti: Oratorio Il Sansone.
- 2004 El maestro de baile y otras Tonadillas - tonadillas: El Maestro de Baile Luis Misón, Ya sale mi guitarra Pablo Esteve, Ya que mi mala fortuna Blas de Laserna, El Vizcaíno Antonio Rosales, La Competencia de las dos hermanas Pablo del Moral.
- 2005 Fiesta Criolla Roque Jacinto de Chavarría, Flores: Ensemble Elyma, choir Ars Longa of Havana.
- 2008 Torrejón y Velasco: Corpus Christi à Cusco Ensemble Elyma. Schola Cantorum Cantate Domino. Gabriel Garrido.
- 2008 Gaspar Fernández and Manuel de Sumaya: Musique à la Cathédrale d'Oaxaca
- 2009 Francesco Cavalli: Gli Amori d'Apollo e di Dafne.
