= 1693 in music =

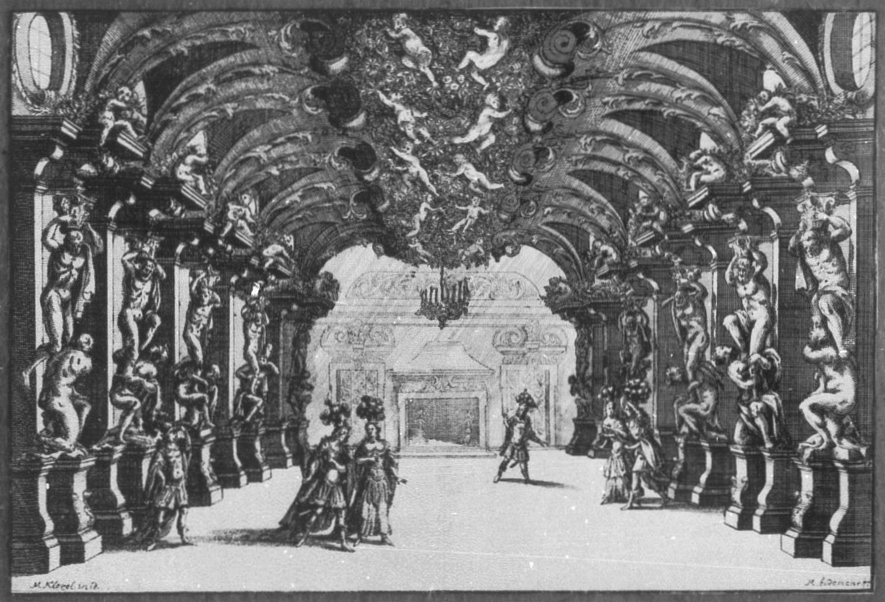
Opera Camillo Generose of Carlo Luigi Pietragrua, Opernhaus am Taschenberg, Dresden, Germany, 1693

The year 1693 in music involved some significant events.

== Events ==
- Georg Philipp Telemann is sent to school in Zellerfeld, in the hope that it will put him off a musical career.
- John Eccles becomes resident composer at Drury Lane theatre.

== Classical music ==
- Heinrich Ignaz Franz von Biber – Vesperæ longiores ac breviores una cum litaniis Lauretanis
- Antonio Caldara – 12 Trio Sonatas, Op.1
- Marc-Antoine Charpentier
  - Antiennes O de l'Avent, H.36-43
  - Prélude pour Magnificat, H.533
  - Noël sur les instruments, H.534
- Philipp Heinrich Erlebach – 6 Ouvertures
- Johann Jakob Froberger – Diverse curiose partite
- Johann Philipp Krieger – 12 Sonatas, Op. 2
- Carlo Antonio Marino – 12 Sonatas, Op. 3
- Johann Pachelbel
  - Erster Theil etlicher Choräle
  - Dies sind die heil'gen zehn Gebot', P.50a
- Henry Purcell
  - O Give Thanks unto the Lord, Z.33
  - Celebrate this Festival, Z.321 (Ode for Queen Mary's birthday)
- Alessandro Scarlatti – Giuditta, R.500.9
- Giuseppe Torelli – Sinfonia in D major, G.4

== Opera ==
- Marc-Antoine Charpentier – Médée
- Henri Desmarets – Didon

== Births ==
- January 28 – Gregor Werner, composer (died 1766)
- August 8 – Laurent Belissen, composer (died 1762)
- October 28 – Šimon Brixi, composer (died 1735)
- date unknown – Lodovico Filippo Laurenti, composer (died 1757)

== Deaths ==
- August 28 – Johann Christoph Bach, court musician (b. 1645)
- September – Pavel Josef Vejvanovský, composer (b. c.1633)
- date unknown
  - Johann Caspar Kerll, composer (born 1627)
  - Andrew Hecht, composer and organist
