= Roque Ceruti =

Italian composer

Roque Ceruti (Milan c. 1683 or 1686 – Lima, 1760) was an Italian composer in Peru. He was recruited as conductor of the Viceroy of Peru's private orchestra, and was a dominant italianizing influence during the period, though this was resented by some of the more traditional Spanish musicians.

He served as maestro de capilla (chapel or choir master) of Trujillo Cathedral from 1721 to 1728, and then maestro at Lima Cathedral until his death. A fair amount of his works survives at the Archivo Arzobispal (Episcopal Archive) of Lima, at the collection that once belonged to the Cathedral of La Plata (i.e. modern Sucre, Bolivia) which is now housed at the Archivo y Biblioteca Nacionales de Bolivia, and at the Seminary of San Antonio Abad in Cusco and at La Paz.

== Recordings ==
- 1998 Roque Ceruti: Vêpres solennelles de Saint Jean Baptiste Ensemble Elyma K617 089
- 2011 Roque Ceruti: "En la rama frondosa", transcripción Susana Sarfson, dirección Rodrigo Madrid Gómez, Capella Saetabis CD "Barroco boliviano", PSCU 540, Valencia (España).
