= Andrés Flores (composer) =

Andrés Flores was one of four important criollo composers in baroque Bolivia trained by Juan de Araujo, during his tenure as choirmaster of the Cathedral of Sucre (then called La Plata) 1680–1712. The other three notable criollo composers were Sebastián de los Ríos, Roque Jacinto de Chavarría, and Blas Tardío y Guzmán.

== Works ==
- juguete Peregrina Agraciada Dios
- A este edificio célebre
- motet Tota pulchra es, Maria and villancico Ay del alma mía!
- Villancico
