= Jácara =

Santiago de Murcia

Jácaras are Spanish songs which are accompanied with instruments and are performed during the entr'acte of a theatrical performance and also as an accompaniment to many types of dance.

== Etymology ==
There are different explanations for the origin of the term. Corominas (1954) gives the origin as an Arabic word for chess, other sources give the origin as Arabic for bellowing or making someone angry.

== Texts ==
The form may be textless, as in the compositions of Santiago de Murcia.

The words of a secular jácara are often about a prankster and his adventures and frequently use vulgar language. Dramatists Calderón de la Barca, Francisco de Quevedo cultivated the genre.

During the late baroque the jácara could also be set to a semi-sacred vernacular text, such as Al arma, al arma valientes for 8 voices for Saint Ignatius of Loyola composed by the chapelmaster of Sucre Cathedral, Bolivia, Juan de Araujo.

== Sources ==
Citations

Bibliography

- Álvaro Torrente, '¿Cómo se cantaba al "tono de jácara"?', en M.L. Lobato y A. Bèhue (eds.), Literatura y música del hampa en Los siglos de Oro (Madrid, Visor, 2014).
