= Poznań Nightingales =

The Poznańskie Słowiki (en: Poznań Nightingales fr: Rossignols de Poznan de: Posener Nachtigallen) is a leading Polish choir founded in 1939.

When the Germans expelled the priest of Poznań Cathedral, Wacław Gieburowski (1878–1943), a choirboy Stefan Stuligrosz, then aged 19, took up running of choir in Gieburowski's name. After the war the choir was recognised and in 1950 became the Boys' and Men's Choir of the Poznań Philharmonic. The choir toured America in 1963, and many countries worldwide thereafter. Stuligrosz was the conductor of the choir (died in 2012)and composer of over 600 choral pieces.

Many alumni of the choir later became famous musicians (e.g. some members of the sextet Affabre Concinui).

== Recordings ==
- Follow the Star — Polish carols with the Poznan Nightingales. MCD006 1994
- God is Being Born — More Polish Carols with the Poznan Nightingales. 1995
- Bonaventura Rubino: Vespro per lo Stellario della Beata Vergine. Various ensembles including Les Rossignols de Poznan. dir. Gabriel Garrido, K617, 1995.
- Chants des Renaissances Italiennes et Polonaises Les Rossignols de Poznan, Jade 2004.
