= Weichmann =

Surname list

Weichmann is a German surname. Notable people with the surname include:

- Herbert Weichmann (1896–1983), German lawyer and politician
- Johann Weichmann (1620–1652), German composer
- Louis J. Weichmann (1842–1902), witness to the assassination of Abraham Lincoln
