= Johann Georg Rauch =

Johann Georg Rauch may refer to:

- Johann Georg Rauch (composer) (1658–1710), German composer and organist at Strasbourg Cathedral
- Johann Georg Rauch (politician) ((1789 – 1851), Swiss politician and playing card manufacturer
