= 1685 in music =

The year 1685 in music involved some significant events.

== Events ==
- The father of Georg Philipp Telemann dies, leaving his widow to bring up the children.
- Antonio Stradivari makes the ex Arma Senkrah violin.
- John Blow is recorded among the private musicians of King James II of England.
- The 17-year-old François Couperin becomes organist at St Gervais in Paris.
- Giovanni Legrenzi becomes maestro di cappella at St Mark's Cathedral, Venice.

== Classical music ==
- Giovanni Bononcini – 12 Sinfonie, Op. 3
- Cristofaro Caresana – Dixit Dominus
- Arcangelo Corelli – Op. 2, 12 trio sonatas
- Le Sieur de Machy – Pieces de Violle
- Nicolas Gigault – Livre de musique pour l'orgue
- Nicolas Lebègue – Livre d'orgue No.3
- Jean-Baptiste Lully
  - Idylle sur la Paix, LWV 68
  - Ballet du temple de la paix, LWV 69
- Johann Christoph Pezel – Fünfstimmige blasende Music
- Henry Purcell – My heart is inditing (anthem), first performed at the coronation of King James II
- Alessandro Scarlatti – Il martirio di S. Teodosia

== Opera ==
- John Blow – Venus and Adonis
- Marc-Antoine Charpentier
  - La Couronne de fleurs
  - Les arts florissants
- Giuseppe Fabrini – La Genefieva
- Jean-Baptiste Lully – Roland

== Births ==
- March 5 (N.S.) – George Frideric Handel, composer (died 1759)
- March 31 (NS) – Johann Sebastian Bach, composer (died 1750)
- June 23 (NS?) – Antonio Maria Bernacchi, castrato singer (died 1756)
- June 30 – John Gay, poet, author of The Beggar's Opera (died 1732)
- September 20 – Giuseppe Matteo Alberti, composer and violinist (died 1751)
- October 26 – Domenico Scarlatti, composer (died 1757)
- December 12 – Lodovico Giustini, early composer for piano (died 1743)

== Deaths ==
- March 31 – Juan Hidalgo de Polanco, harpist and composer (born 1614)
- July 4 or (5) – George Jeffreys, composer (born c.1610)
- September 22 – Ignazio Albertini, Italian musician and composer (born 1644)
- date unknown
  - Jean-Baptiste Boësset, French composer (born 1614)
  - Yatsuhashi Kengyo, Japanese musician and composer (born 1614)
