= 1582 in music =

== Publications ==
- Lodovico Agostini – Third book of madrigals, for six voices (Ferrara: Francesco Rossi & Paolo Tottorino)
- Blasius Amon – Liber sacratissimarum (quas vulgo introitus appellant) cantionum selectissimus (Vienna: Stephan Creuzer)
- Vittorio Baldini (ed.) – Il lauro secco (anthology of madrigals)
- Paolo Bellasio – Second book of madrigals for five voices (Venice: heirs of Girolamo Scotto)
- Antoine de Bertrand – Airs spirituels for four and five voices (Paris: Le Roy & Ballard), contains hymns and canticles
- Jacobus de Kerle – 4 Masses for four and five voices (Antwerp: Christophe Plantin)
- Paschal de l'Estocart
  - First book of Sacrae cantiones for four, five, six, and seven voices (Lyon: Barthelemi Vincent)
  - First and Second book of octonaires de la vanité du monde for three, four, five, and six voices (Lyon: Barthelemi Vincent)
  - Cent vingt et six quatrains du Sieur de Pibrac for two, three, four, five, and six voices (Lyon: Barthelemi Vincent), settings of poems by Guy Du Faur, Seigneur de Pibrac
- Francisco Guerrero – Second book of masses (Rome: Domenico Basa)
- Paolo Isnardi – Magnificats for four, five, and six voices (Venice: heirs of Girolamo Scotto)
- Orlande de Lassus
  - Sacrae cantiones for five voices (Munich: Adam Berg)
  - Motets for six voices (Munich: Adam Berg)
  - Lectiones sacrae novem, ex libris Hiob excerptae for four voices (Munich: Adam Berg), a collection of readings from the Book of Job
  - Etliche außerleßne, kurtze, gute geistliche und weltliche Liedlein for four voices (Munich: Adam Berg), a collection of his chansons with new German texts
- Carolus Luython – First book of madrigals for five voices (Venice: Angelo Gardano)
- Luzzasco Luzzaschi – Third book of madrigals for five voices (Venice: Angelo Gardano)
- Giovanni de Macque – Second book of madrigaletti et napolitane for six voices (Venice: Angelo Gardano)
- Luca Marenzio – Third book of madrigals for five voices (Venice: Angelo Gardano)
- Philippe de Monte – First book of madrigals for three voices (Venice: Angelo Gardano)
- Claudio Monteverdi – Sacrae Cantiunculae (Little Sacred Songs) for three voices (Venice: Angelo Gardan)
- Pomponio Nenna – First book of madrigals for five voices (Venice: Angelo Gardano)
- Giovanni Pierluigi da Palestrina – Fourth book of masses (Venice: Angelo Gardano)
- Piae Cantiones (collection of late medieval Latin songs)

== Births ==
- May 1 – Marco da Gagliano, composer (d. 1643)
- June 26 – Johannes Schultz, composer (d. 1653)
- December 23 – Severo Bonini, organist, composer and music writer (d. 1663)
- date unknown
  - Gregorio Allegri, Italian composer (d. 1652)
  - Sigismondo d'India, Italian composer (d. 1629)

== Deaths ==
- March – Severin Cornet, Franco-Flemish singer, conductor and composer (born c.1530)
- May 3 or 4 – Giorgio Mainerio, Italian composer (born 1530/40)
- July 14 – Johannes de Cleve, composer at the court of Ferdinand I and Charles II (born c.1529)
- date unknown
  - Leonora Sanvitale, Italian courtier and singer (born c.1558)
  - Pere Alberch Vila, organist and composer (born 1517)
