= Antonio il Verso =

Italian composer

Antonio Il Verso (1565 – August 23, 1621) was an Italian composer.

Il Verso was born at Piazza Armerina, and began his musical studies under the guidance of Pietro Vinci. He was active in Venice in the last years of the sixteenth century is given in Venice, then the seat of the Venetian school, where he refined his studies in the madrigal and polyphonic music. Back in Sicily settled in Palermo where he taught music at the Convent of San Domenico, on Via dei Bambinai. He was an exponent of mannerism and set to music verses major poets such as Torquato Tasso and Gabriello Chiabrera in addition to the major poets of the period. He often utilised melodies of other composers, modifying their style but not distorting their compositional integrity. In the 1591 Second Book of ricercars, Verso based his ricercars on the models of his teacher Vinci.

Between 1590 and 1619 Verso composed at least 15 books of madrigals for 5 voices, and additional books for 3 and 4 voices and monodies. He died in Palermo on August 23, 1621.

Il Verso is honoured today as the patron composer of the Palermo-based Associazione per la musica antica Antonio Il Verso, and the early music group Studio di Musica Antica Antonio Il Verso, frequently directed by Gabriel Garrido.

== Works ==
- 1590 First Book of Madrigals for 5 voices.
- 1591 Second Book of 11 Motets and 14 Ricercars in 3 voices by Pietro Vinci with 7 Ricercars by Antonio Il Verso. Probably intended for a trio of viols.
- 1611 Sacrum Cantionum for 2,3,4 voices with a dialogue for 6 voices.
- 1617 4° Libro di Madrigali a 3 voci di Antonio Il Verso, Palermo.
- 1619 Fifteenth Book of Madrigals for 5 voices. Including a parody of the Lamento d'Arianna a 5 by Claudio Monteverdi's Sixth Book of Madrigals.

== Recordings ==
- Pietro Vinci and Antonio il Verso: Ricercars. Diego Cannizzaro, organ. Tactus 2008
- Lamento d'Arianna – Lasciatemi morire in the settings of Monteverdi, Antonio Il Verso, etc. Consort of Musicke dir. Anthony Rooley
