= Gli amori d'Apollo e di Dafne =

Opera by Francesco Cavalli

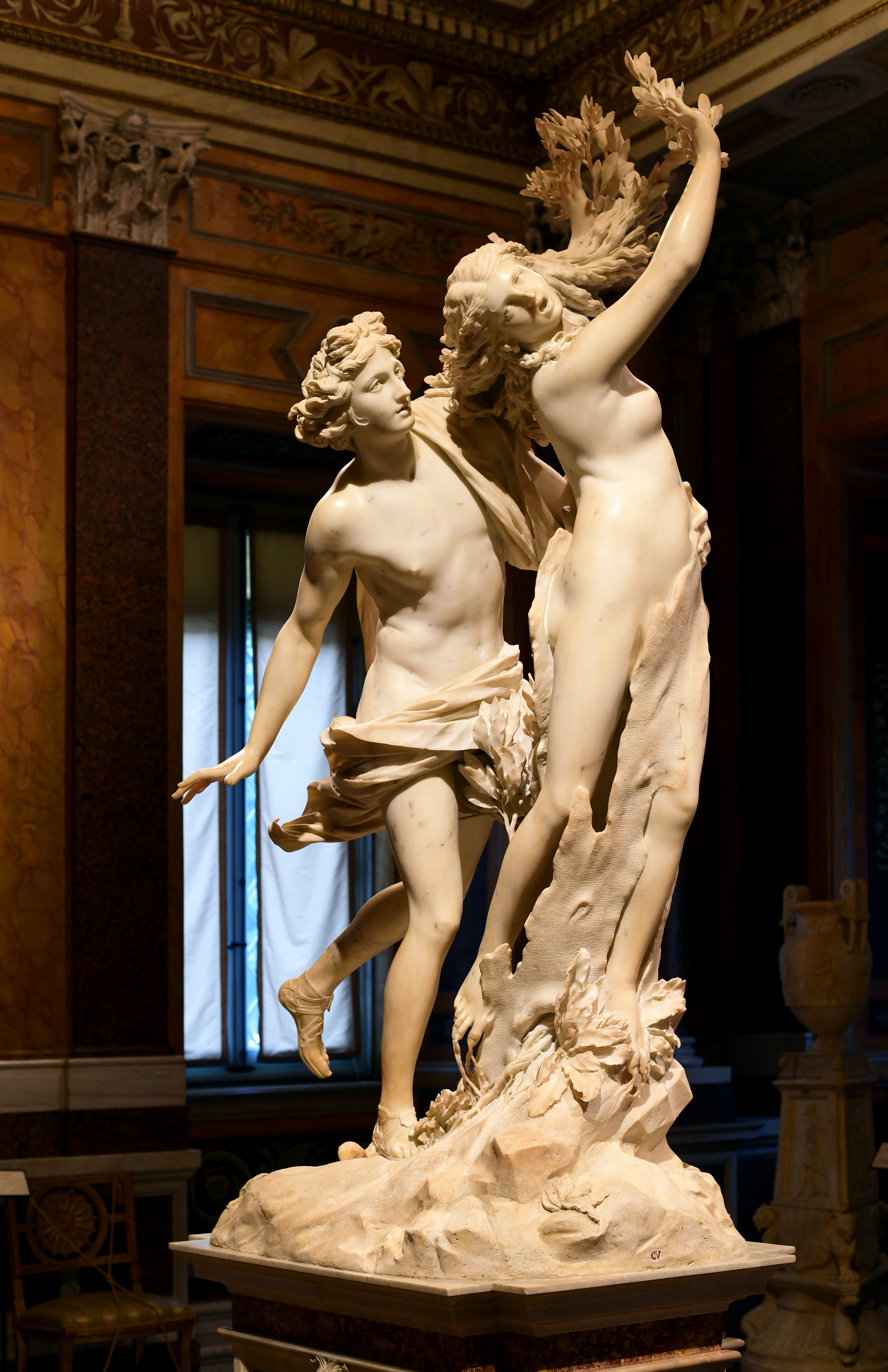
Apollo and Daphne

Gli amori d'Apollo e di Dafne (The Loves of Apollo and Daphne) is an opera by the Italian composer Francesco Cavalli. It was Cavalli's second operatic work and was premiered at the Teatro San Cassiano, Venice during the Carnival season of 1640. The libretto is by Giovanni Francesco Busenello and is based on the story of the god Apollo's love for the nymph Daphne as told in Ovid's Metamorphoses.

== Roles ==
Role	Voice type	Premiere Cast, 1640 (Conductor: - )
Apollo	haute-contre	
Dafne	mezzo-soprano	
Aurora	soprano	
Cefalo	tenor	
Amore	soprano	
Filena	soprano	
Alfesibeo	baritone	
Sonno	bariton	
Cirilla	haute-contre	
Venere	mezzo-soprano	
Giove	bass	
Pan	tenor	
Morfeo	tenor	
Procris	soprano	
Itaton	soprano	
Titonio	tenor	
Peneo	bass	
Panto	bass	
Three muses	mezzo-soprano and two sopranos	
Coro de Ninfe e Pastori

== Recordings ==
- Gli Amori d'Apollo e di Dafne Orquestra Joven de la Sinfónica de Galicia, Alberto Zedda, Naxos, 2006.
- Gli amori d'Apollo e di Dafne Ensemble Elyma, Gabriel Garrido, K617 2009.
- Gli amori d'Apollo e di Dafne, Act 3: Misero Apollo Philippe Jaroussky, Artaserse.
- The Loves of Apollo & Dafne Filmed performance (2021) at Pinchgut Opera(subscription required)
