= Affabre Concinui =

Polish singing group

- Choir
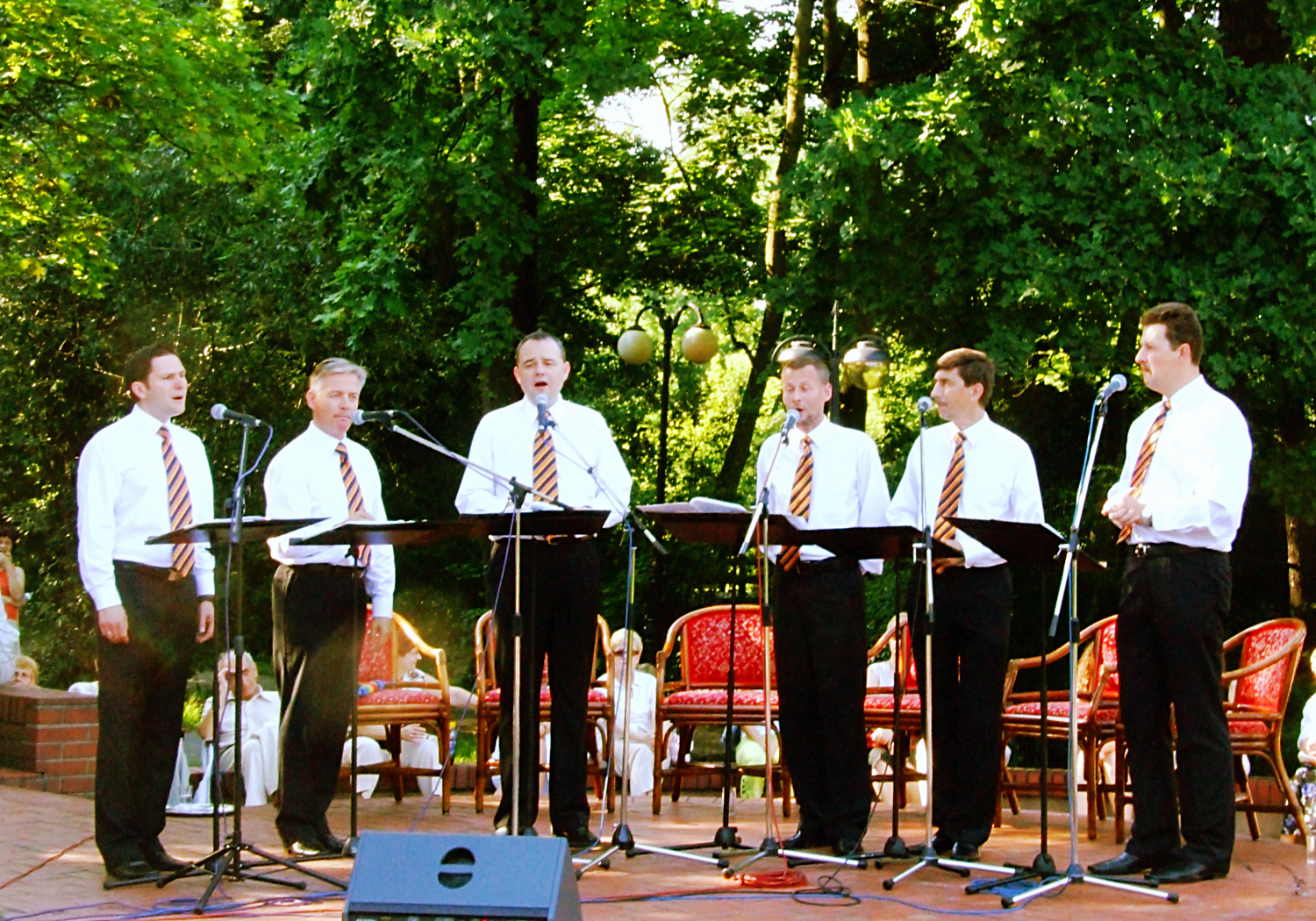
- Concert of Affabre Concinui in Poznań, 15 July 2007 (from left to right: Robert Hylla, Leszek Marciniak, Przemysław Czekała, Piotr Lewandowski, Piotr Dziurla, Artur Hoffmann)
- Origin: Poznań, Poland
- Founded: 1983
- Genre: Classical; Pop
- Members: Robert Hylla; Leszek Marciniak; Przemysław Czekała; Piotr Lewandowski; Piotr Dziurla; Artur Hoffmann
- Website: affabre.net

Affabre Concinui, also known as Affabre – The Chamber Singers, are a Polish a cappella vocal ensemble (sextet) founded in 1983 by alumni of two famous Polish choirs: Poznań Boys' Choir and Poznań Nightingales, inspired by the British ensemble The King's Singers. The name of the ensemble (Affabre Concinui) means in Latin "perfectly attuned" or "ideally harmonized", which is an artistic credo of the group. They quickly gained renown in Poland and many other countries.

== History ==
The group has always consisted of six singers, with their membership changing over the years. The current ensemble is composed of:

- Robert Hylla (countertenor 1)
- Leszek Marciniak (countertenor 2)
- Przemysław Czekała (tenor)
- Piotr Lewandowski (baritone)
- Piotr Dziurla (bass 1)
- Artur Hoffmann (bass 2)

Former members include Wojciech Drabowicz, Krzysztof Piernik, Przemysław Stanisławski, Tadeusz Gawroński, and Radosław Skrzypczak.

== Repertoire ==
Their concerts combine many forms of music: traditional (folk, Christmas carols), classical (renaissance to contemporary music) and pop hits, often with imitation of musical instruments. Over the years their library has expanded to over 300 works of all styles, composed by Giovanni Pierluigi da Palestrina, Wacław of Szamotuły, Thomas Tallis, Orlando di Lasso, Thomas Morley, Franz Schubert, Robert Schumann, Frederic Chopin, Stanisław Moniuszko, Maurice Ravel, Krzysztof Penderecki, Krzesimir Dębski, Freddie Mercury, The Beatles, Sting, etc.

The group is best known for its a cappella performances in both Poland and abroad: Algeria, Austria, Belgium, China, Czech Republic, Denmark, Finland, France, Germany, Italy, Japan, Lebanon, Netherlands, South Korea, Spain, Switzerland, Taiwan, Turkey, Ukraine, Vatican, United Kingdom, and United States). The group represented Poland during EXPO in Sevilla (1992), Hannover (2000), and Aichi (2005), during the Festival of Polish Culture in Taiwan, Days of Polish Culture in Beijing and Algiers, the World Economic Forum in Davos as well as in concerts that accompanied the Olympic Games in Atlanta (1996).

== Awards ==
In 1994 the ensemble was awarded the 2nd prize at the 42nd International Guido d'Arezzo Polyphonic Contest in Arezzo, Italy, and in 1988 it became the winner of the International Competition of Choral Composition "Seghizzi" in Gorizia, Italy, in the category of chamber ensembles. In 1987, the Young Art Medal was awarded to Affabre Concinui by the editorial board of the Polish newspaper Głos Wielkopolski. In 2008, at the Edinburgh Festival Fringe, the ensemble earned a five-star review in The Herald.

== Educational activities ==
Beside recording and performing, the Affabre singers are committed to education, participating in master classes and workshops (e.g. at the Academy of Music in Poznań or the Gorzkie żale workshop in Poznań).

== Discography ==
- Musique de la Renaissance Polonaise (1991)
- From Marley to McCartney
- Boże Narodzenie z Affabre Concinui (Christmas with Affabre Concinui)
- Znaszli ten kraj (Do you know the country)
- Lata dwudzieste, lata trzydzieste (The 1920s, the 1930s)
- Thomas Tallis, Wacław z Szamotuł...
- The Polish Chamber Singers live
- Thomas Tallis, Mikołaj Zieliński...
- Poważni niepoważnie (Serious ones unseriously)
- Great Pretenders
- Sing we at pleasure
- Affabre Na Bis (Affabre encore)
- Kolędy (Christmas carols)
- Great Pretenders II
- 25 lat Affabre Concinui (25 years of Affabre Concinui) (2008)
- Great Pretenders III
