= Abade António da Costa =

Portuguese composer

Abade António da Costa (1714–1780?) was a Portuguese composer who, born in the Porto region, left the country around 1749 for Rome, from where he moved to Vienna, where he is thought to have died around 1780.

== See also ==
- List of Portuguese composers
