= Benito Bello de Torices =

Spanish composer

Benito Bello de Torices (c. 1660–1714) was a Spanish composer, maestro at the Convent of Las Descalzas Reales and professor of music at the Royal College of Pages of His Majesty, Madrid, during the reigns of Charles II and Philip V. His family was minor gentry. His surviving works include villancicos, estribillos.
