= Francesco Turini =

Italian composer and organist

Francesco Turini (c. 1595 – 1656) was an Italian composer and organist in the early Baroque era.

Turini was born around 1595 in Prague, and was a pupil of his father Georgio Turini, a singer and cornetist at the court of Emperor Rudolf II. Francesco became court organist at the age of 12, and wrote madrigals, motets, masses, and trio sonatas for two violins and basso continuo. He died in Brescia, Italy.
