= Robert Ramsey (composer) =

English composer and organist

Robert Ramsey (1590s – 1644) was a Scottish-born composer and organist.

He seems to have been from a family of court musicians to King James VI of Scotland, who followed him to London when he became King James I of England.

He probably began composing around 1610 and may have had court connections, having composed tributes to Henry Frederick, Prince of Wales, who died in 1612. He graduated as a Bachelor of Music from the University of Cambridge in 1616. He was organist of Trinity College, Cambridge from 1628 until 1644 and Master of the Children at the college from 1637.

In the 1630s, like John Hilton, he composed mythological and biblical dialogues, such as Dives and Abraham, Saul and the Witch of Endor, and Orpheus and Pluto.

His most well-known work is probably "How are the mighty fallen", an anthem for soprano, alto, tenor and bass. It is regularly performed throughout cathedrals and churches, normally in England. The work is in the "Tudor Anthems" book, print by music publisher Novello & Co. and edited by Lionel Pike.
