= Giovanni Maria Casini =

Italian composer

Giovanni Maria Casini (16 December 1652 – 25 February 1719) was an Italian composer, notably of oratorios in his native Florence.

== Selected works and recordings ==
- Pensieri in partitura for organ, Op.3 1714, recorded Francesco Tasini Tactus 2012
- Casini oratorio: Il Viaggio Di Tobia Laura Antonaz, Claudine Ansermet, Mya Fracassini, Jeremy Ovenden, Sergio Foresti, I Barocchisti, Diego Fasolis Dynamic, DDD, 2004 2015
