= Andrew Hecht =

Andrew Hecht, sometimes given as Andreas Hecht, (died 1693) was a Dutch-born composer and organist who was active in England during the second half of the 17th century.

== Biography ==
Andrew Hecht was born in Holland at an unknown date. He came to England in 1663 when he was appointed organist at the Lincoln Cathedral (LC); succeeding Thomas Mudd in that position. It is likely he obtained this post after meeting Michael Honywood, the LC's dean, during the British Interregnum when Honywood spent time in Leiden and Utrecht.

Hecht composed nine known anthems which demonstrate his assimilation of the music style of the Church of England. The exact date of his death in Lincoln, England in 1693 is unknown, but he was buried there on March 31, 1693. Two of his better known anthems, "Out of the deep" and "God is our Hope", are preserved in the library at the LC.

Andrew's son, Thomas Hecht, succeeded Daniel Purcell as organist at Magdalen College, Oxford in 1695; holding that post until his death in 1734.
