= John Adson =

English musician and composer

John Adson (c. 1587 – 29 June 1640) was an English musician and composer. Little is known about his early life; the first certain reference to him comes in 1604, when he was in service to Charles III, Duke of Lorraine as a cornett player. Some time around February 1614 he married Jane Lannerie and at least two of their sons went on to become musicians themselves.

After relocating to London, Adson joined the City Waits and remained a member until his death. He is also associated with theatre music, being referenced in plays by the King's theatre company in 1634 and 1639. He became royal wind musician in November 1633.

His best-known work is his Courtly Masquing Ayres (1621), a collection of 31 lively dances for a variety of instruments in five- and six-part consorts. It is uncertain how much of this collection is his original work, and how much is arrangements of existing masque dances. Besides this work, only four other pieces attributed to Adson are known.
