= Maria Cattarina Calegari =

Italian composer

Cornelia Calegari [Maria Cattarina (also known as Maria Caterina)] (1644 – after 1675), was an Italian composer, singer, organist, and nun. She was revered for her singing talents in her home city and became a published composer in 1659, at the age of 15, with the release of her book of motets, Motetti à voce sola.

== Life and career ==
Cornelia was born at Bergamo. On 19 April 1661, she took her final vows as a nun at the Benedictine Convent of Santa Margherita in Milan, taking on the religious name of Maria Cattarina. Her career began in a golden age of female musicians and composers in Italian convents and she became one of the most famous, drawing crowds from near and far. These performances garnered her the title, La Divina Euterpe, in reference to Euterpe the muse. Calegari wrote complex musical compositions, producing multiple masses for six voices with instrumental accompaniment, madrigals, canzonettas, vespers, and other sacred music. Furthermore, she was known for conveying great emotion in her work at a time when most music was devoid of such expression.

In 1663, Archbishop Alfonso Litta and the Catholic Church silenced this musical era with orders not to produce or perform music for at least three years after scandals and concerns regarding music and morality arose in the region. It is believed that these orders, in combination with a disagreement with the convent over Calegari's spiritual dowry, are major factors involved in the disappearance of all physical manifestations of her music leaving only written accounts of their existence.

== Some known works ==
=== Vocal ===
- Madrigali a due voci
- Madrigali e canzonette a voce sola

=== Sacred ===
- Messe a sei voci con instrumenti
- Motetti à voce sola
- Vespers
