= Bonaventura Rubino =

Italian composer

Fray Bonaventura Rubino (c. 1600–1668) was an Italian composer.

According to his publications, his origin of "Montecchio di Lombardia" probably indicates that he was from Montecchio in Darfo Boario Terme, one hour east of Bergamo. He was maestro di cappella at the Cathedral of Palermo from 1643 to 1665.

Rubino's 1644 Vespro dello Stellario was reconstructed in 1996 and subsequently performed by 120 musicians, four organs and a large group of vocal soloists, in 12 choirs and with the instrumental groups laid out in a star formation.

== Works ==
- Op. 1 Vespro della Beata Vergine - Prima parte del tesoro armonico Palermo, 1645
- Op. 2 Messa, e Salmi A Otto Voci, Concertati nel Primo Choro di Fr. Bonaventura Rubino da Montecchio di Lombardia. 1651
- Op. 3 Il primo libro de motetti concertati a due, tre, quattro, e cinque voct. Di F. Bonaventura Rubino da Montechio di Lombardia Min F. dedicati all'illustriss. et eccellentiss. signor D. Fr. Martin de Leon, et Cardenas arcivescovo di Palermo 1651
- Op. 4 Il secondo libro de mottetti a due, tre, quattro, e cinque voa, con una Messa de morti 'nelfine a 5 concertata 1653 - edition together with the requiem of Mario Capuana (1650), 1999.
- Op. 5 Salmi Varii Variamente Concertati con Sinfonie d'obligo, et a beneplacito di F. Bonaventura Rubino da Montecchio di Lombardia. Palermo. 1655. 23 settings of 9 psalms.
- Op. 6 Salmi
- Op. 7 Salmi 1658

== Recordings ==
- Vespro per lo Stellario. Vocal ensemble of the Studio di Musica Antica Antonio Il Verso, Palermo; Coro G.P. Palestrina of Messina; Ensemble Eufonia of Palermo; Ensemble Mille Regretz of Catania; Les Rossignols de Poznan. Ensemble Elyma. Direction: Gabriel Garrido, K617. 2CD
- Bonaventura Rubino, Vepres du Stellario de Palermo, YouTube
