= Johann Stadlmayr =

Composer

Johann Stadlmayr (or Stadelmayer) (born perhaps around 1580 probably in Freising; died 12 July 1648 in Innsbruck) was a composer and long serving Hofkapellmeister to the Princes of Tirol.

Stadlmayr joined the Hofkapelle in Salzburg in 1603, rapidly rising to the post of Hofkapellmeister there and being appointed in 1607 Hofkapellmeister at the court of Innsbruck by Maximilian III, Archduke of Austria and later employed by his successor Leopold V. He wrote primarily church music, with 21 publications of masses, motets and music for Vespers issued in Augsburg, Munich, Passau, Vienna, Ravensburg, Antwerp and Innsbruck. His contemporary Michael Praetorius called him a „trefflichen Contrapunctisten und Musicus“.
