= 1658 in music =

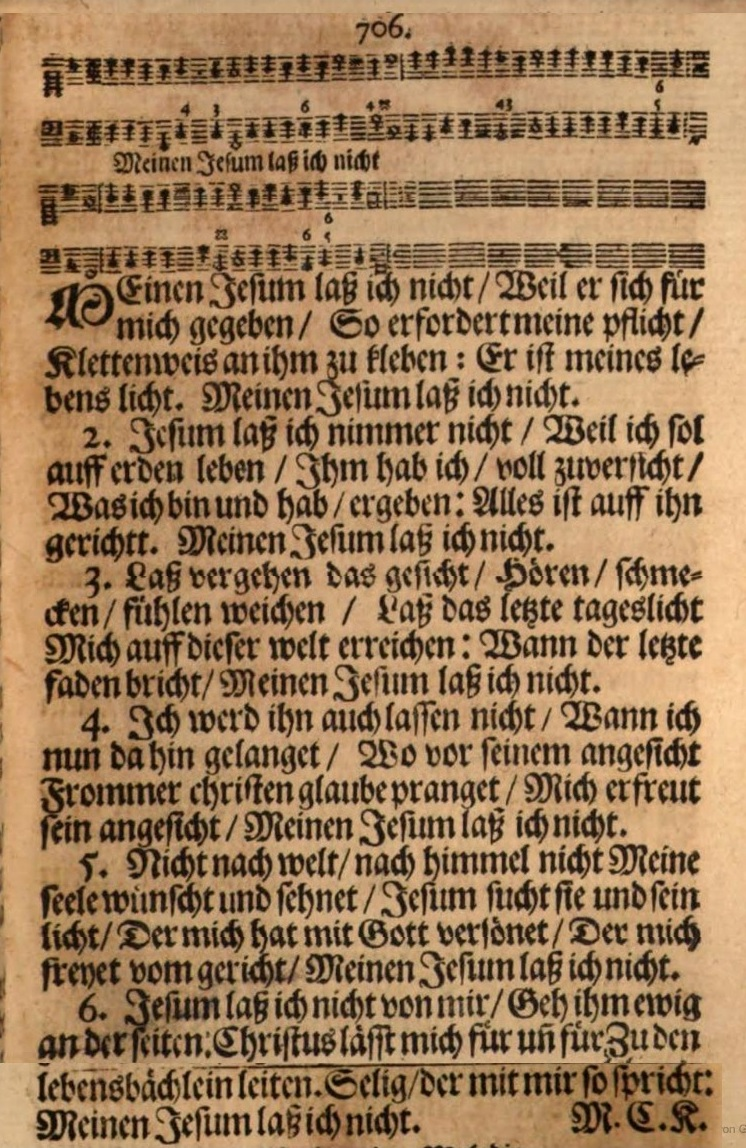
I will not let my Jesus be in: Praxis Pietatis Melica, edition 1693.

The year 1658 in music involved some significant events.

== Events ==
- Johann Jacob Froberger leaves Vienna for the last time.
- Sir William Davenant's "operatic show," The Cruelty of the Spaniards in Peru, is staged at the Cockpit Theatre in London during the summer.

== Publications ==
- Antoine de Cousu – Musique universelle, contenant toute la pratique, et toute la théorie
- Johann Jacob Froberger – Libro terzo, A-Wn Mus.Hs.16560
- Henry Lawes – Ayres and Dialogues for One, Two and Three Voyces, vol. 3
- Etienne Moulinié – Meslanges de sujets Chrestiens ... avec une basse continue, a collection of sacred music

== Classical music ==
- Johann Rudolf Ahle -- Ich hab's gewagt
- Louis Couperin – Ave Maris Stella, OL 9
- Andreas Hammerschmidt – chorale: Meinen Jesum laß ich nicht, after Christian Keymann's hymn
- Jean-Baptiste Lully – Ballet d'Alcidiane, LWV 9

== Opera ==
- Johann Caspar Kerll – Applausi Festivi

== Births ==
- April 22 – Giuseppe Torelli, Italian composer (died 1709)
- October 11 – Christian Heinrich Postel, librettist (died 1705)
- date unknown
  - Maria Francesca Nascimbeni, Italian composer (died 1680)
  - Johann Georg Rauch I, composer (died 1710)
- probable – Jean Desfontaines, composer (died c.1752)

== Deaths ==
- March – Valentin Dretzel, composer
- September 17 – Georg Philipp Harsdörffer, lyricist
- August 11 – Antoine de Cousu, composer and theorist
- August 27 – Stefano Fabri, Jr., musician
- November 15 – Jacobus Revius, lyricist
- probable
  - Dario Castello, Italian composer (born c.1590)
  - Henry Ferrabosco, English court musician
