= Johann Georg Kühnhausen =

German composer

Johann Georg Kühnhausen (also Johannes Georg Kühnhausen) (buried 25 August 1714) was a German composer.

== Life ==
Little is known about the life of Kühnhausen. From 1660 his name is registered to the court of Duchy of Brunswick-Lüneburg in Celle where he spent the rest of his life and was buried.

== Works ==
The only known work of Kühnhausen is Passio Christi secundum Matthäum.

== Sources ==
- Guenter Thomas's article in New Grove Dictionary of Music
- Adam Adrio's article in Die Musik in Geschichte und Gegenwart
- W. Engelhardt: "Kantor Kühnhausens Celler Passionsbuch und Karfreitags-Ordnung", Monatsschrift für Gottesdienst und kirchliche Kunst, xxxii (1927)
