= Lodovico Filippo Laurenti =

Italian composer

Lodovico Filippo Laurenti (1693–1757) was a composer from Bologna, Italy whose family was active in Bolognese musical life. His father, Bartolomeo, a composer and violinist, was a founder of the Accademia Filarmonica di Bologna. Lodovico's older brother Pietro Paolo, a composer as well, was also a singer and cellist who became an Accademia member in 1698. Lodovico studied violin with his father, counterpoint with his brother, and learned to play a variety of musical instruments as well. He replaced his brother in a local orchestra as a violist in 1712, and joined the Accademia in 1717. Lodovico composed an oratorio entitled Maria Stuarda Regina d"Inghilterra, which received several Bolognese performances in 1718. In 1721, Lodovico's twelve Sonate da camera per violoncello e basso were published, dedicated to Sicinio Pepoli, a Count who was an amateur musician. The following year, 1722, Lodovico left Bologna, choosing to live in Portugal as well as travel to Spain, France, the Dutch Republic and England.
