= Leonora Sanvitale =

Italian noblewoman and singer

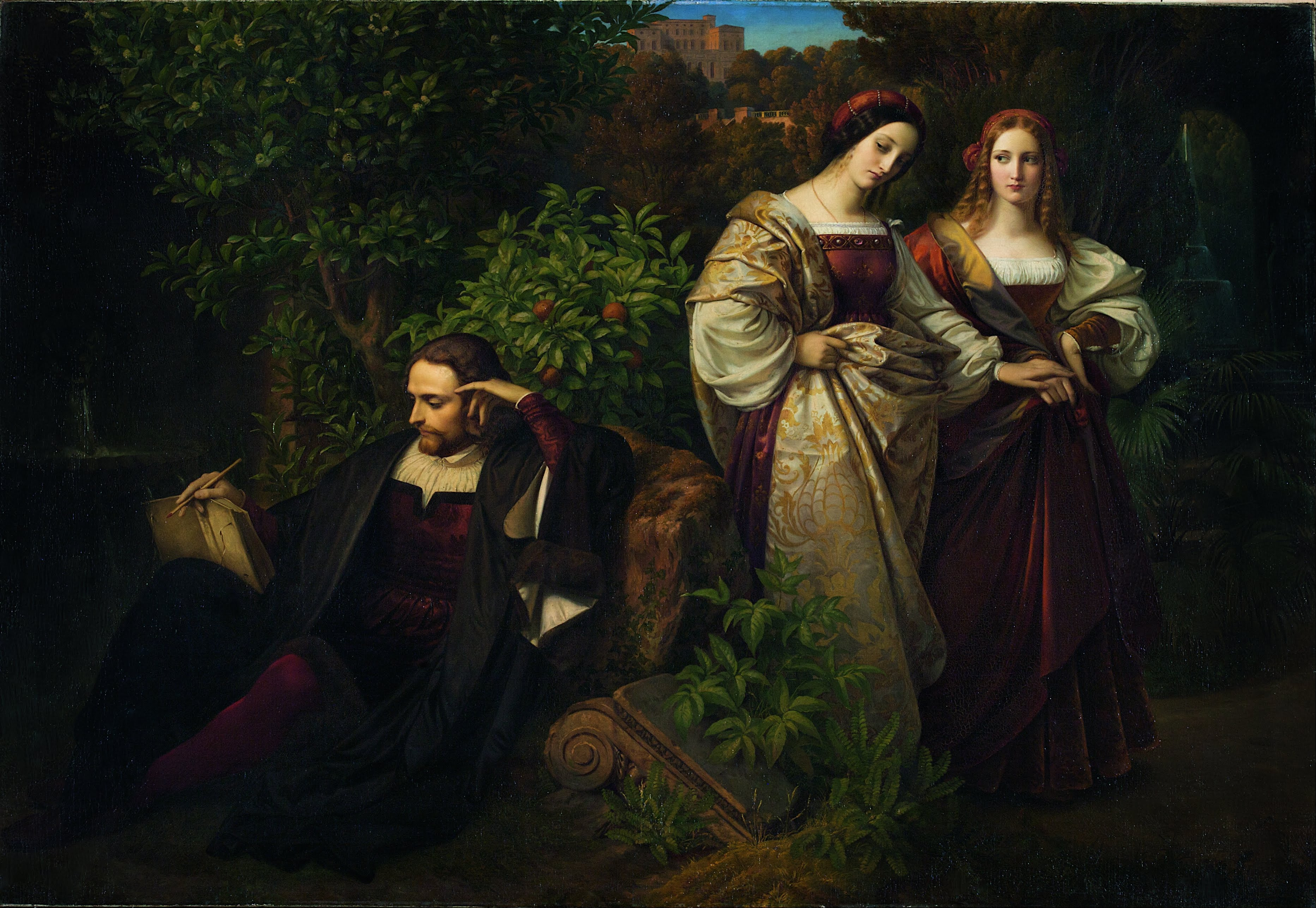
A painting of Carl Ferdinand Sohn - Torquato Tasso and the Two Leonores

Leonora Sanvitale (Contessa di Scandiano) (c. 1558–1582) was a noblewoman and singer at the Este court at Ferrara, whose stepmother was Barbara Sanseverino.

She joined the court in 1576 when she married Giulio Tiene, Count of Scandiano.
