= Christian Gottlob Hubert =

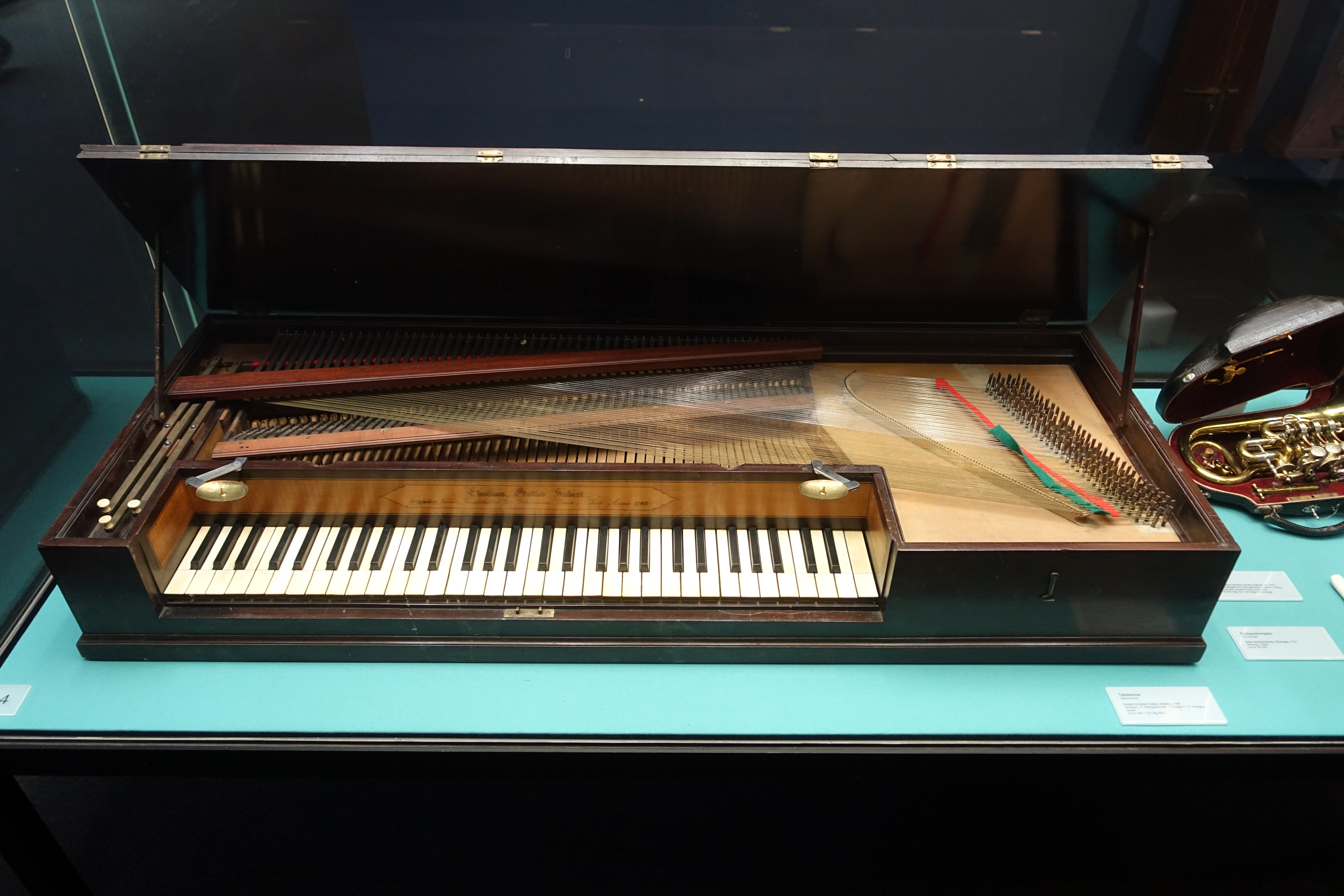
Square piano by Christian Gottlob Hubert, Ansbach, 1787

Christian Gottlob Hubert (1714–1793) was a famous builder of keyboard instruments. Today, he is best known as a clavichord maker. Some of his instruments have been preserved in the collection at Bad Krozingen.
