= Blas Tardío de Guzmán =

Bolivian criollo composer

Blas Tardío de Guzmán (fl. 1740s) was a Bolivian criollo composer, one of four notable criollo students of Juan de Araujo. He succeeded Juan Guerra y Biedma as chapelmaster, maestro de capilla, of the Cathedral of Sucre, then called La Plata, in 1745.

== Works, editions, and recordings ==
- El monstruo de los jardines
