= 1640 in music =

== Events ==
- January 21 – Salmacida Spolia, the final royal masque of the Caroline era, is performed at Whitehall Palace. The work features music by composer Lewis Richard.

== Publications ==
=== Music ===
- Agostino Agazzari – Musicum encomium, divini nominis, simplicibus... (Rome: Vincenzo Blanco)
- Angelo Michele Bartolotti – Libro primo di chitarra spagnola, published in Florence
- Scipione Dentice – Second book of madrigali spirituali for five voices (Naples: Ottavio Beltrano)
- Giovanni Girolamo Kapsberger – Libro quarto d'intavolatura di chitarrone (Rome)

=== Theory ===
- Pietro Della Valle – Della musica dell'età nostra che non è punto inferiore, anzi è migliore di quella dell'età passata (About the Music of our Time, which is not Worse but Better than that of Previous Ages)

== Classical music ==
- Claudio Monteverdi – Selva morale e spirituale, published in Venice

== Opera ==
- Francesco Cavalli – Gli amori d'Apollo e di Dafne
- Benedetto Ferrari – Il pastor regio, premiered in Venice
- Claudio Monteverdi – Il ritorno d'Ulisse in Patria

== Births ==
- January 5 – Paolo Lorenzani, composer (died 1713)
- April 4 – Gaspar Sanz, Spanish priest and composer (d. 1710)
- August 8 – Amalia Catharina, German poet and composer (d. 1697)
- November 4 – Carlo Mannelli, Italian violinist, castrato singer and composer (d. 1697)
- probable – Antonia Bembo, singer and composer (d. c. 1720)

== Deaths ==
- February 12 – Michael Altenburg, composer and theologian (born 1584)
- April 10 – Agostino Agazzari, Sienese composer and music theorist (born 1578)
- June – Peter Hasse, German organist and composer (b. c. 1585)
- June 29 – John Adson, musician and composer (born c. 1587)
- November – Giles Farnaby, virginalist and composer (born 1563)
- Adriana Basile, Italian composer (b. 1580)
- Francisca Duarte, Portuguese singer (b. 1595)
