= Metropolitan Cathedral of Sucre =

Roman Catholic church in Sucre, Bolivia

Coordinates: 19°02′55″S 65°15′37″W

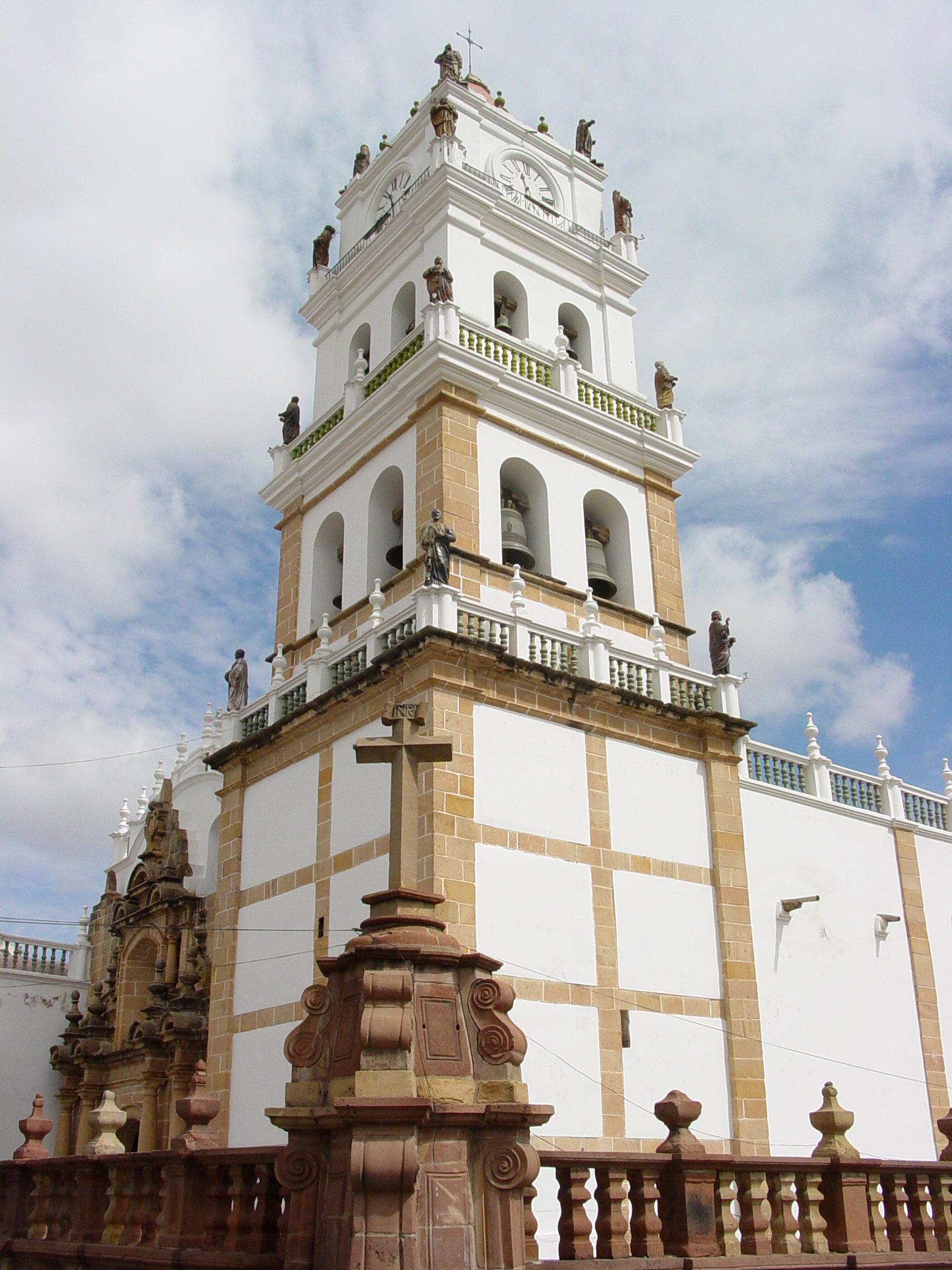
The Metropolitan Cathedral

The Metropolitan Cathedral of Sucre, also called Cathedral of the Immaculate Conception is a cathedral of Sucre, formerly La Plata, Bolivia is the seat of the Roman Catholic Church in Bolivia. It was built between 1559 and 1712.

== Music ==
Juan de Araujo, was maestro de capilla of the Cathedral of La Plata 1680–1712, training up four important criollo composers: Andrés Flores, Sebastián de los Ríos, Roque Jacinto de Chavarría, and Blas Tardío y Guzmán who himself was maestro from 1745.

The manuscript collection is now in the National Archive and Library of Bolivia. Items have been entered by UNESCO on the Memory of the World Programme.

== See also ==
- Roman Catholicism in Bolivia
