= Ignazio Albertini =

Italian violinist and composer (c1644-1685)

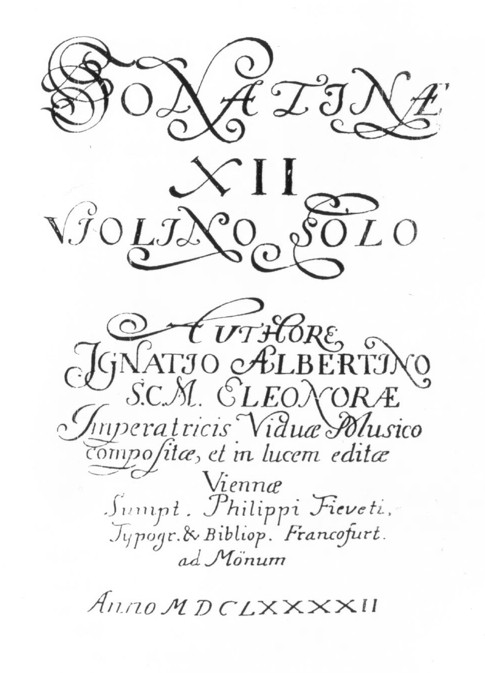
Title page of Sonatinae, the 1692 collection which contains Albertini's only surviving music

Ignazio Albertini (Albertino) (c. 1644 – 22 September 1685) was an Italian Middle Baroque violinist and composer.

Very little is known about Albertini's life. He may have been born in Milan, but first surfaces in Vienna, in a letter exchange between the famous violinist Johann Heinrich Schmelzer of the Viennese court and Karl II von Liechtenstein-Kastelkorn, Prince-Bishop of Olomouc. Apparently, Albertini was guilty of some sort of misconduct, but both Schmelzer and the Prince-Bishop express their high opinion of him as a musician. The letter exchange dates from September 1671, so by that time Albertini was in Vienna; how he got there and what positions he occupied is unknown. That he was introduced to the Prince-Bishop, a well-known collector of music, and knew Schmelzer, one of the most important musicians at the court, seems to indicate that Albertini was much respected in Vienna. Nothing is known about his career, except that at some point he entered the service of Eleanor Gonzaga, widow of Ferdinand III, as chamber musician, and held that position until his death, which occurred in Vienna on 22 September 1685 when Albertini was murdered. The circumstances of the murder (Albertini was stabbed to death) are unknown.

As a composer, Albertini is known by a single collection of music, the twelve Sonatinae (sonatas for violin and basso continuo) posthumously published in Vienna and in Frankfurt in 1692. The collection was prepared for publication by Albertini himself, but he did not live to see it printed, possibly because of the high cost of the copperplate engraving process. Albertini's sonatas are multi-sectional pieces, very varied in content and structure, and all of the highest quality. Some idea of the rich variety of forms found in the Sonatinae may be gleaned from the following examples: Sonata IX is a passacaglia in which the main theme is presented as a canon at the fifth in the first and the last sections; and statements of the ostinato sometimes overlap with formal sections of the sonata. Sonata XII, the last in the cycle, consists entirely of imitative movements, unlike other sonatas, in which imitative movements are either absent or are surrounded by free sections, such as slow lyrical arias, toccata-like movements with rapid passagework over sustained bass notes, etc. Albertini's sonatas are very demanding technically, with frequent instances of difficult fast passages, leaps, sudden changes of register and, particularly in the last sonata, double stopping.

Apart from the Sonatinae, two works are known by name from catalogues: Sonata hyllaris ex C à 10 (from a 1699 inventory) and a suite of 7 pieces à 4.
