= Pietro Vinci =

Italian composer

Pietro Vinci (c. 1525 – after 14 June 1584) was an Italian composer of late Renaissance music.

Vinci was born in Nicosia. He was active in Bergamo and then in various Sicilian cities as Maestro di cappella. He published several books of madrigals and church music from 1561 to 1584.
