= Johann Weichmann =

German composer (1620–1652)

Johann Weichmann (also Wichmann) (9 January 1620 – 24 July 1652) was a German composer.

== Life and career ==
Johann Weichmann was born on 9 January 1620 in Wolgast to Simon Weichmann and Ursula Burchmann. At age thirteen years old his father died and his mother remarried to Georg Wagner. Weichmann studied at the Gymnasio Hamelensium for three years, where he became the choirmaster. He studied for another three years and became organist of the Petershagen church in Danzig. Weichmann studied in Königsberg from 1640 to 1643, became an organist in Wehlau in 1643, and later returned to Königsbert in 1647 as cantor of the Altstadt Church, a position he held until his death. He died on 24 July 1652 in Königsberg, aged 32.

== Music ==
A prolific composer of both sacred and secular music, Weichmann belonged to the same school of Königsberg song composers as Heinrich Albert and Georg Neumark. His most important collection, Sorgen-Lägerin, consists of 65 strophic songs set to texts by Martin Opitz and Johann Franck, published in 1648 in Königsberg. The composer's sacred works are mostly lost, including a cantata on Psalm 133. Of the surviving church music, the more elaborate ones likely originated from his time as a cantor. Weichmann also wrote a number of occasional music, including various songs, a Kyrie, a Benedictus, a mass, and several motets.
