= Bartolomeo Montalbano =

Italian Baroque composer

Bartolomeo Montalbano (c. 1598 - before 18 March 1651, Venice) was an Italian Baroque composer.

Montalbano was born in Bologna. After entering the Franciscan order, in 1619, he got his musical education there. From 1629, he worked as a Kapellmeister in Palermo and from 1642 until his death, he held the same position at the San Francesco in Bologna.

His sacred music has not survived, but his baroque symphonies for various orchestration, motets and a mass for four voices have been preserved.

== List of selected works ==
- Sinfonie ad uno, e doi violini, a doi, e trombone, con il partimento per l’organo, con alcune a quattro viole (Palermo 1629)
- Motetti ad 1, 2, 3, 4, et 8 voci, con il partimento per l’organo, et una messa a 4 voci (Palermo 1629)

== Sources ==
- Article on German Wikipedia
- The New Grove Dictionary of Music and Musicians
