= Gabriel Garrido =

Argentinian conductor

Gabriel Garrido is an Argentinian conductor specialising in Italian baroque and the recovery of the baroque musical heritage of Latin America.

Garrido was born 1950 in Buenos Aires, and at the age of 17 with the Argentine recorder quartet, Pro Arte, undertaking two tours in Europe. He studied music at University of La Plata, in Zurich, and at the Schola Cantorum Basiliensis, specialising in the lute, baroque guitar and reed instruments of the Renaissance. He became a member of the Ensemble Ricercare and Jordi Savall's Hesperion XX, with whom he made several recordings.

From 1977 he was a teacher at the Centre de Musique Ancienne at the Conservatoire de Musique de Genève, where in 1981 he founded Ensemble Elyma a performance and research ensemble. He has a long working relationship with the Studio di Musica Antica Antonio Il Verso of Palermo.

In 1992 Garrido commenced recording the key early recordings in the series Les Chemins du Baroque for the French label K617, which brought significant critic acclaim. UNESCO's International Music Council (IMC) invited Garrido to organize workshops, conferences, and concerts in an international symposium dedicated to the Latin American baroque, at Bariloche, Argentina, situated in the foothills of the Andes, for which UNESCO awarded him its "Mozart Medal".

Garrido is also known for his work on Italian music, in particular his cycle of Monteverdi's operas, ballets and vespers and Vespro per lo Stellario della Beata Vergine of Bonaventura Rubino. From 1990, the Teatro Massimo in Palermo has called on Garrido annually to make an opera creation. In 2000 the Fondazione Cini, Venice, awarded him a special prize in recognition of his artistic activities on behalf of Italian music in the preceding ten years.

Garrido has conducted operas at the Festival d'Ambronay and Festival de Beaune. He has brought baroque opera home to the Teatro Colón in Buenos Aires with performances including Monteverdi's L'Orfeo (June 2001) and Rameau's Les Indes Galantes, (October 2002).

== Selected discography ==
With Ensemble Elyma:

See article: Ensemble Elyma

With Studio di Musica Antica Antonio Il Verso di Palermo:

- See discography: Discographia (Italian)
