= Johann Georg Rauch (composer) =

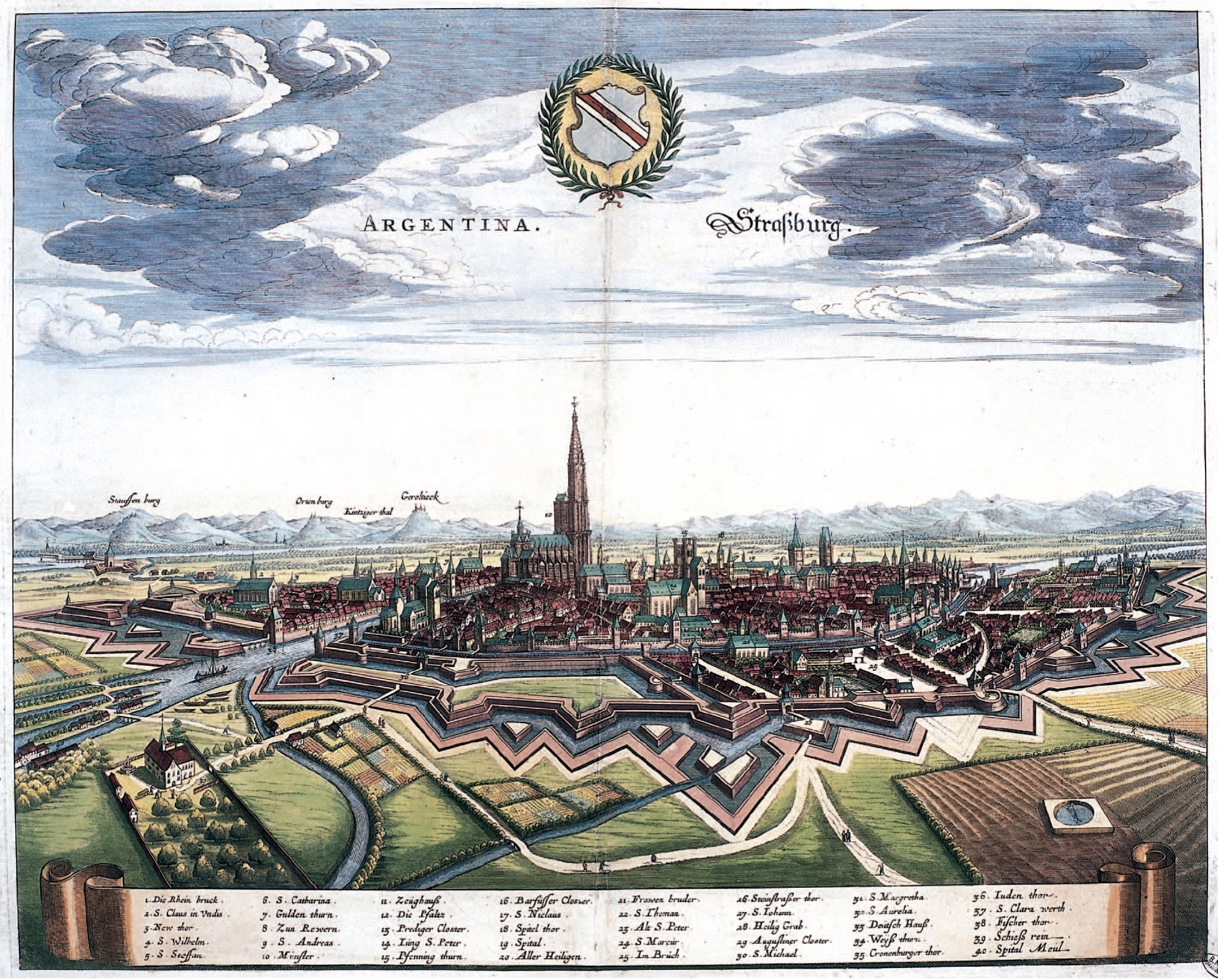
Strasbourg (c. 1644)

Johann Georg Rauch (1658, in Soultz-Haut-Rhin – 1710) was a German composer, and organist at Strasbourg Cathedral. His death was the occasion for the first performance of the Requiem of his colleague Franz Xaver Richter.
