= Juan de Araujo =

Spanish composer

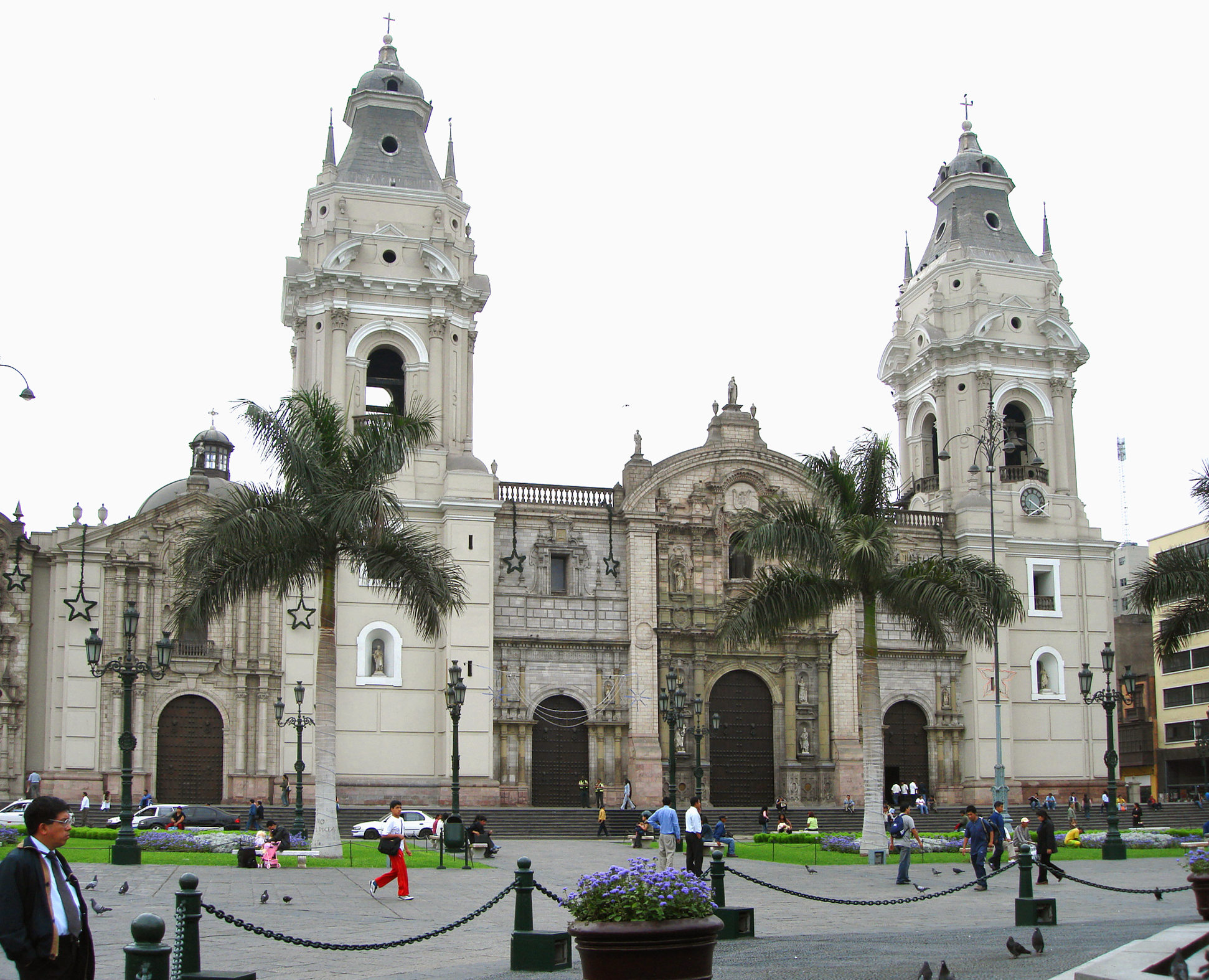
Araujo was first chapelmaster at Lima Cathedral, Peru

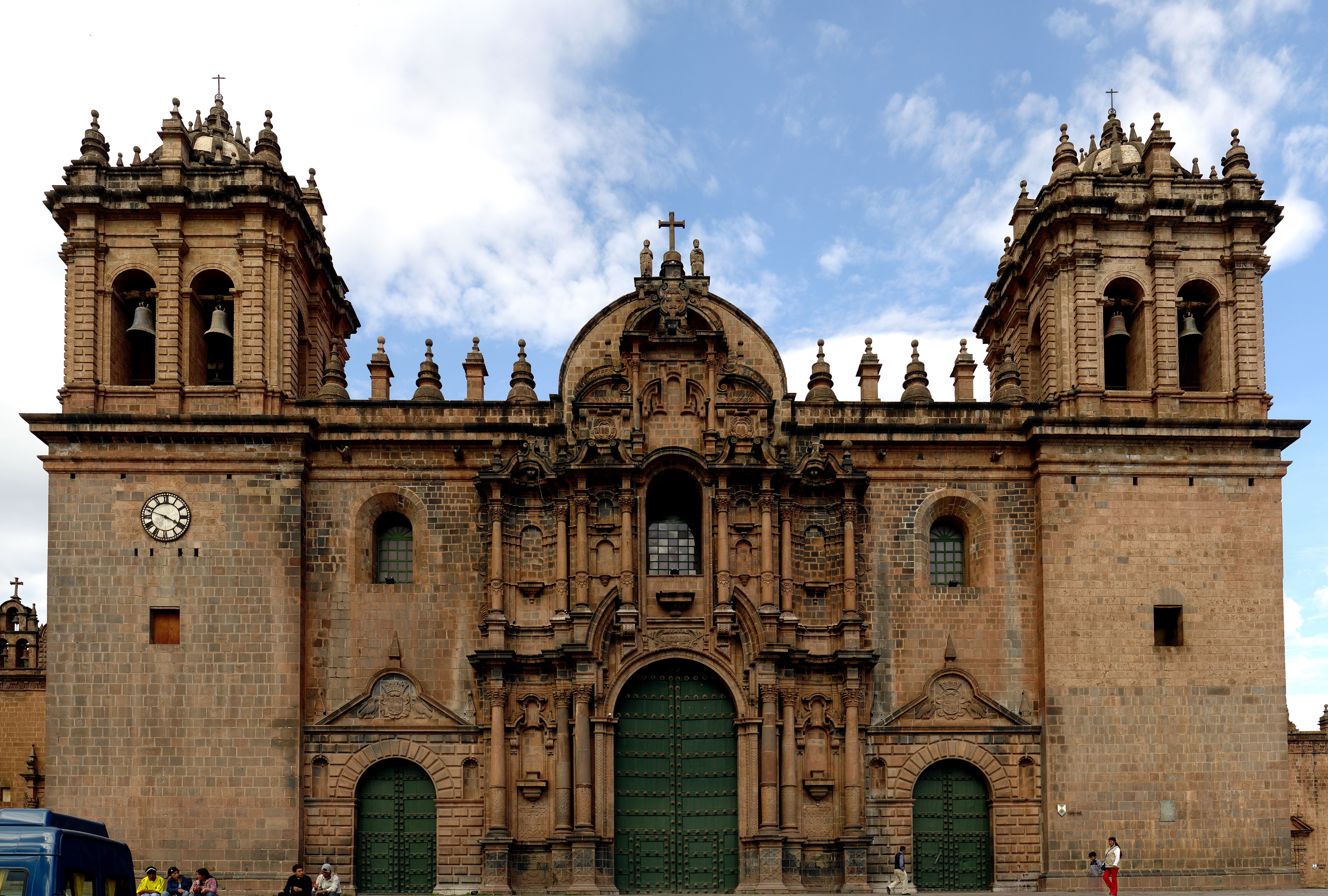
Araujo's second appointment at the Cathedral of Santo Domingo, in Cuzco, Peru

Juan de Araujo (1646–1712) was a musician and composer of the Early to Mid Baroque.

Araujo was born in Villafranca, Spain. By 1670 he was nominated maestro di cappella of Lima Cathedral, Peru. In the following years he travelled to Panama and most probably to Guatemala. On his return to Peru, he was hired as maestro de capilla of Cuzco Cathedral, and in 1680 of Sucre Cathedral (then the Cathedral of La Plata) in Upper Peru (now in Bolivia), where he stayed until his death, and where he trained up to four notable música criolla composers including Blas Tardío de Guzmán.

== Works, editions and recordings ==
- Al arma, al arma valientes Jácara a 8 for Saint Ignatius of Loyola.
