= 1641 in music =

The year 1641 in music involved some significant events.

== Events ==
- Heinrich Bach becomes organist of St Mary's Church, Arnstadt.
- Franz Tunder succeeds Peter Hasse as organist of the Marienkirche in Lübeck.

== Publications ==
- Benedetto Ferrari – Musiche varier a voce sola, volume 3, published in Venice
- Claudio Monteverdi – Selva morale e spirituale (Venice: Bartolomeo Magni)
- Cornelis Padbrué
  - Kusjes... (Amsterdam, Broer Jansz)
  - Synphonia in nuptias... (Amsterdam, Broer Jansz), written to celebrate the marriage of Everswyn and Lucia Buys

== Classical music ==
- Johann Schop – Werde munter, mein Gemüte

== Opera ==
- Francesco Cavalli – La Didone
- Claudio Monteverdi – Le nozze d'Enea con Lavinia, premiered in Venice

== Births ==
- October 14 – Joachim Tielke, German maker of musical instruments (died 1719)

== Deaths ==
- November 28 – Robert Dowland, English lutenist and composer (born c.1591)
- date unknown – Estêvão de Brito, Portuguese composer of polyphony (born c. 1570)
- probable – Francesco Usper, Italian composer and organist (born c. 1570)
