= Alberich Mazak =

Czech-Austrian composer

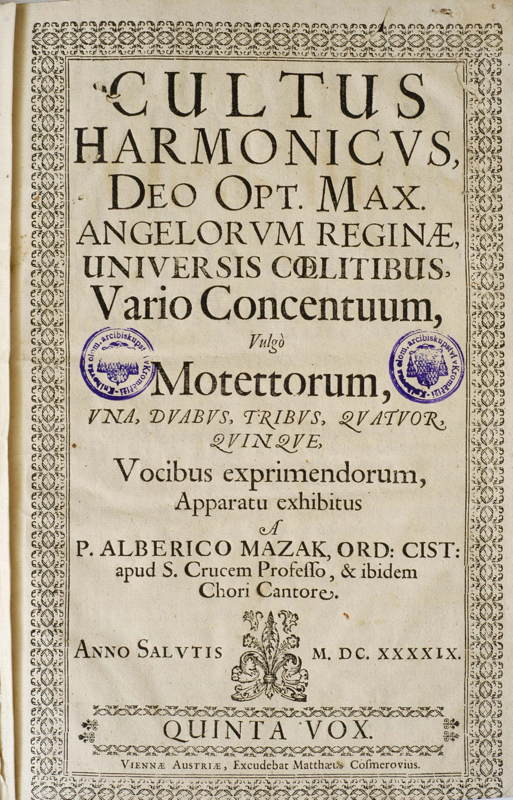
Cultus Harmonicus op.I - Opus Minus

Alberich Mazak, also Alberik Mazák (1609 – 9 May 1661) was a Czech-Austrian composer.

== Early life ==
Mazak was born in Ratibor in the Kingdom of Bohemia (now Racibórz, Poland) to a Czech family. After studying music and philosophy, he entered Heiligenkreuz Abbey in 1631 and was ordained a priest in 1633.

== Works, editions and recordings ==
Mazak created more than 300 compositions. He wrote masses, litanies, offertories, antiphons, psalms and sacred cantatas. The instruments he used most were the violin, the trumpet, the bassoon, the viola da gamba, the cornet and the sackbut. His compositions, predominantly motets, collected under the title Cultus harmonicus, were published by him in Vienna, Opus I in 1649, Opus Minus (II) in 1650 and Opus Maius (III) in 1653. The last one is missing today.

- Baroque Vespers at Stift Heiligenkreuz - Cistercian Monks of Stift Heiligenkreuz, Wieninger Oehms Classics C826
- De Profundis re Bassi Carpe Diem CD-16274

A baroque lute built in 1631, which had been played at Mazak's ordination, was used in the recording of Wolf Erichson's Stift Heiligenkreuz Geistliche Musik (Sacred Music from Holy Cross Monastery), directed by Niederaltaicher Scholaren and Dr. Konrad Ruhland and published by Sony Music under the SEON label (1970–1980).
