= 1656 in music =

The year 1656 in music involved some significant events.

== Events ==
- May – The Siege of Rhodes, Part I, by Sir William Davenant, the "first English opera" (under the guise of a recitative), is performed in a private theatre at his home, Rutland House, in the City of London. The vocal music is by Henry Lawes, Matthew Locke and Capt. Henry Cooke, and the instrumental music by Charles Coleman and George Hudson. The performance includes the innovative use of painted backdrops and the appearance of England's first professional actress, Mrs. Coleman as Ianthe.

== Publications ==
- Michel Lambert's first compositions are printed by Ballard.

== Classical music ==
- Johann Jakob Froberger – Libro quarto di toccate, ricercari, capricci, allemande, gigue, courante, sarabande (presentation manuscript)

== Opera ==
- The Siege of Rhodes (see Events above)

== Births ==
- May 31 – Marin Marais, viol player and composer (died 1728)
- September 9 – Johann Caspar Ferdinand Fischer, composer (died 1746)
- November 3 – Georg Reutter, theorbo player and composer (died 1738)
- date unknown
  - Jean-Baptiste Moreau, composer (died 1733)
  - Johann Paul von Westhoff, violinist and composer (died 1705)

== Deaths ==
- June 9 – Thomas Tomkins, composer (born 1572)
- July – Michelangelo Rossi, violinist and composer (born 1601 or 1602)
- November 6 – King John IV of Portugal, patron of music and the arts, writer on music and amateur composer
- date unknown
  - Andrea Falconieri, lutenist and composer (born c.1585)
  - Francesco Turini, organist and composer (born c. 1595)
