= 1643 in music =

The year 1643 in music involved some significant events.

== Events ==
- Composer Johann Crüger meets hymn-writer Paul Gerhardt, resulting in a collaboration.
- Johann von Rist publishes his Himmlische Lieder, later set to music by Johann Sebastian Bach.
- Pierre Robert becomes master of music at Senlis Cathedral.

== Publications ==
- Marco Scacchi – Cribrum musicum

== Classical music ==
- Carlo Milanuzzi
  - Ninth book of ariose vaghezze for one and two voices with accompaniment, Op. 20 (Venice: Alessandro Vincenti)
  - Concerto sacro de salmi intieri for two and three voices, book 2, Op. 21 (Venice: Alessandro Vincenti)
- Cornelis Thymanszoon Padbrué
  - Eere-krans..., written for the wedding of Constantin Sohier and Catharina Koymans
  - 't Lof van Jubal..., Op. 3, a collection of madrigals and motets

== Opera ==
- L'Incoronazione di Poppea – Claudio Monteverdi
- Egisto (opera) – Francesco Cavalli

== Births ==
- July 28 – Antonio Tarsia, composer (died 1722)
- December – Johann Adam Reincken, organist and composer (died 1722)
- date unknown – Marc-Antoine Charpentier, composer (died 1704)

== Deaths ==
- February 25 – Marco da Gagliano, composer (born 1582)
- March 1 – Girolamo Frescobaldi, composer and organist (born 1583)
- April 20 – Christoph Demantius, composer (born 1567)
- May 17 – Giovanni Picchi, organist and composer (born c.1571)
- November 29 – Claudio Monteverdi, composer (born 1567)
- December 8 – Antoine Boësset, French court musician and composer (born 1586)
- probable – Guillaume Bouzignac, French composer (born c.1587)
