= 1657 in music =

The year 1657 in music involved some significant events.

== Events ==
- March 11 – Johann Adam Reincken becomes organist of the Bergkerk at Deventer.
- July 17 – Following the death of Tobias Michael in June, Sebastian Knüpfer is appointed Thomaskantor at Leipzig.
- Maurizio Cazzati becomes the Maestro di Cappella at San Petronio in Bologna and opens his violin school in Bologna.
- King Louis XIV of France engages Étienne Richard as royal harpsichord teacher, in place of Jacques Champion de Chambonnières.

== Popular music ==
- Gaspar de Verlit – Anthology of Christmas carols

== Classical music ==
- Henri Dumont – Meslanges à 2, 3, 4 et 5 parties
- Joannes Florentius a Kempis – Cantiones Natalitiae
- Giovanni Legrenzi – Salmi a cinque
- Heinrich Schütz
  - 12 Geistliche Gesänge, Op.13
  - Herr, nun lässest du deinen Diener, SWV 432-433
- Barbara Strozzi – Ariette a voce sola, Op.6

== Opera ==
- Francesco Cavalli – Artemisia
- Michel de La Guerre – Triomphe de l'Amour sur les Bergers et les Bergères (sung in 1655, but first staged as an opera in 1657)

== Births ==
- March 18 – Giuseppe Ottavio Pitoni, organist and composer (died 1743)
- July 25 – Philipp Heinrich Erlebach, composer (died 1714)
- December 15 – Michel Richard Delalande, French composer and organist (died 1726)
- probable – Gaetano Greco, composer (died c.1728)

== Deaths ==
- March – John Hilton the younger, lutenist and composer (born c.1599)
- March 26 – Jacob van Eyck, nobleman and musician (born c.1590)
- June 26 – Tobias Michael (born 1592)
- October 21 – Alessandro Costantini (born c. 1581)
- October 23 – Domenico Massenzio, Italian composer (born 1586)
- date unknown
  - Franciszek Lilius, composer (born c. 1600)
  - Pietro Paolo Sabbatini, composer (born 1600)
