= 1655 in music =

This article contains information about the musical events and publications of 1655.

== Events ==
- Composer Johann Rosenmüller is imprisoned as the result of accusations of homosexual activities with choirboys.

== Classical music ==
- Giovanni Legrenzi – Op. 2, a collection of sonatas

== Opera ==
- Giuseppe Alfiero – La fedeltà trionfante (lost)

== Births ==
- May 4 – Bartolomeo Cristofori, inventor of the piano (died 1731)
- August 13 – Johann Christoph Denner, wind instrument maker (died 1707)
- Probable – Robert de Visée, lutenist, guitarist, theorbist and violin player (died 1732)

== Deaths ==
- April 4 – Johann Erasmus Kindermann, organist and composer (born 1616)
- July 30 – Sigmund Theophil Staden, German composer (born 1607)
