= Cornelis Thymanszoon Padbrué =

Dutch composer

Cornelis Thymanszoon Padbrué (c. 1592–1670) was a Dutch composer.

== Life ==
Padbrué was born and died in Haarlem. He came from a musical family and entered the company of "stadsspeelluiden" (city musicians) in his native city, but was dismissed from civic service in 1635 as a result of a long-running quarrel. From then on he supported himself as a freelance musician, and little further of his life is known. He was buried in 1670 in the Sint-Bavokerk in Haarlem.

== Works ==
Padbrué published several collections of madrigals and motets on texts by, among others, the poets Jacob Westerbaen and by the Haarlem painters Salomon de Bray and Pieter de Grebber. He also composed theatre music for the plays of Joost van den Vondel.

The well-known melody from the round "'O Kerstnacht! schoonder dan de dagen", from Vondel's tragedy Gjisbrecht van Amstel is attributed to Padbrué. Moreover, there also appeared in print two instrumental Symphonias by him, consisting each of a pavane and a galliard.

Padbrué's chief work was the oratorio "De tranen Petri ende Pauli" (The Tears of Peter and Paul) from 1647, also on a text by Vondel. It is considered as the first northern-European oratorio, but unfortunately not all of the work has survived.

Padbrué showed all sorts of international influences, and at most levels his works were different from others produced at that time, but the expression of the words or the "madrigalism" was always the most important factor for him.

His collection Kusjes (Kisses, 1631) set madrigals to Dutch translations of the erotic poetry in Latin of Janus Secundus of the Hague (1511–1536).

== Works, editions and recordings ==
=== Publications ===
- Kusjes (1631), madrigals collection
- De Kruisbergh (1640), madrigals and motets collection
- ’t Lof van Jubal, eerste vinder der Musycke (1643), madrigals and motets collection
- ’t Lof Jubals, tweede boeck (1645), madrigals and motets collection
- De tranen Petri ende Pauli (1646), oratorio - lost

=== Recordings ===
- Dutch madrigals Camerata Trajectina, (Globe)
