= 1650 in music =

The year 1650 in music involved some significant events.

== Publications ==
- Alberich Mazak – Cultus harmonicus, volume two, a collection of his complete works, published in Vienna
- Claudio Monteverdi – Messa a quattro voci, et Salmi a Una, Due, Tre, Quattro, Cinque, Sei, Sette, & Otto Voci Concertati (Mass for four voices, and Psalms arranged for one, two, three, four, five, six, seven, and eight voices) (Venice: Alessandro Vincenti), published posthumously

== Classical music ==
- Melchior Franck – Der 133. Psalm Davids (Siehe wie fein und lieblich) for five voices (Coburg: Johann Eyrich), published posthumously
- Samuel Scheidt – Tabulatur-Buch
- Heinrich Schütz – Symphoniae sacrae, part 3
- probable
  - Giovanni Battista Abatessa – Ghirlanda di varii fiori (Garland of Various Flowers), a collection of guitar music, published in Milan
  - Giovanni Battista Granata – Nuove suonate di chitarriglia spagnuola piccicate, e battute..., a collection of guitar music, published in Bologna

== Opera ==
- Francesco Cavalli – Orimonte

== Births ==
- date unknown
  - Joachim Neander, hymn-writer (d. 1680)
  - André Raison, organist and composer (d. 1719)
- probable
  - Cataldo Amodei, Italian composer (d. c. 1695)
  - Papanasa Mudaliar, Carnatic music composer (d. 1725)
  - Giovanni Battista Rogeri, luthier
  - Robert de Visée, luthenist, guitarist and viol player (d. 1725)

== Deaths ==
- May 20 – Francesco Sacrati, composer (b. 1605)
- November 24 – Manuel Cardoso, organist and composer (b. 1566)
- date unknown – Martin Peerson (born ca. 1571 – ca. 1573; died 1650 or 1651), English composer, organist and virginalist
