= 1645 in music =

The year 1645 in music involved some significant events.

== Events ==
- Juan Hidalgo de Polanco becomes leader of the chamber musicians at Spain's royal court.

== Publications ==
- Giovanni Battista Abatessa – Intessatura di varii fiori..., a collection of guitar music, published in Naples

== Classical music ==
- Girolamo Frescobaldi – Canzoni alla francese, a posthumous print
- Cornelis Thymanszoon Padbrué - 't Lof Jubals, Op. 4, a collection of madrigals and motets

== Opera ==
- Giovanni Faustini – Doriclea

== Births ==
- February 9 – Johann Aegidus Bach, organist and conductor (died 1716)
- February 22 (twins)
  - Johann Ambrosius Bach, musician (died 1695)
  - Johann Christoph Bach, musician (died 1693)
- November 30 – Andreas Werckmeister, organist and composer (died 1706)

== Deaths ==
- April 16 – Tobias Hume, soldier, viol player and composer (born c.1569)
- September 24 – William Lawes, English composer (born 1602)
- date unknown – William Smith, composer (born 1603)
