= 1648 in music =

The year 1648 in music involved some significant events.

== Events ==
- End of the Thirty Years' War (1618–1648), which had disrupted German cultural development during much of the first half of the 17th century.
- July 1 – Ambrosius Reiner is appointed Kapellmeister at the court of Innsbruck, succeeding his father-in-law Johann Stadlmayr
- December 6 – The marriage of Count Maximilian Willibald of Waldburg-Wolfegg and Clara Isabella Princess of Aarschot and Arenberg is celebrated with a performance of Bartholomäus Aich's musical-dramatic festival play Armamentarium comicum amris et honoris.
- Alexis of Russia's 1648 law "About the correction of morals and the destruction of superstitions" (Об исправлении нравов и уничтожении суеверий) has banned all the secular music in Russia. It ordered to publicly burn all the folk instruments and those performers who disagree had to be physically punished and deported to Malorossia (modern Ukraine).

== Publications ==
- Johann Rudolph Ahle – Compendium per tenellis
- Manuel Cardoso – Livro de varios motetes, officio da semana santa e outras cousas (Lisbon: João Rodrigues for Laurenco Craebeck)
- Francesco Corbetta – Varii Scherzi di Sonate per la Chitara Spagnola, Libro Quarto, published in Brussels
- Chiara Margarita Cozzolani – Scherzi di sacra melodia a voce sola (Venice)
- Marco Dionigi – Li primi tuoni, overo Introduttione nel canto fermo (Parma; enlarged, second edition 1667)
- Giovanni Giacomo Gastoldi – Balletten met drie stemmen (Amsterdam: Cornelis de Leeuw) [with fourth part added by Leeuw]
- Henry Lawes – Choice Psalmes
- Teodoro Massucci – Dialoghi spirituali (Rome)
- Paulus Matthysz (ed.) – 20 Koninklijcke fantasien (Amsterdam: Paulus Matthysz)
- Johann Rist – Der zu seinem allerheiligsten Leiden und Sterben hingeführter und an das Kreutz gehefteter Christus Jesus (Hamburg), with songs by Heinrich Pape
- Heinrich Schütz – Geistliche Chor-Music (Spiritual Choral Music)

== Births ==
- July 9 – Arp Schnitger, German organ builder (d. 1719)
- August 9 (baptized) – Johann Michael Bach, German composer (d. 1694)

== Deaths ==
- January 9 – David Gregor Corner, German theologian, hymnologist, poet, and composer (born 1585)
- July 12 – Johann Stadlmayr, German composer and organist (born c.1580)
- August 20 – Edward Herbert, 1st Baron Herbert of Cherbury, English courtier, amateur lutenist, and composer (born March 3, 1582)
- November 17 – Thomas Ford, English composer (born c.1580)
- unknown – Michael East, English composer (born c.1580)
