= 1652 in music =

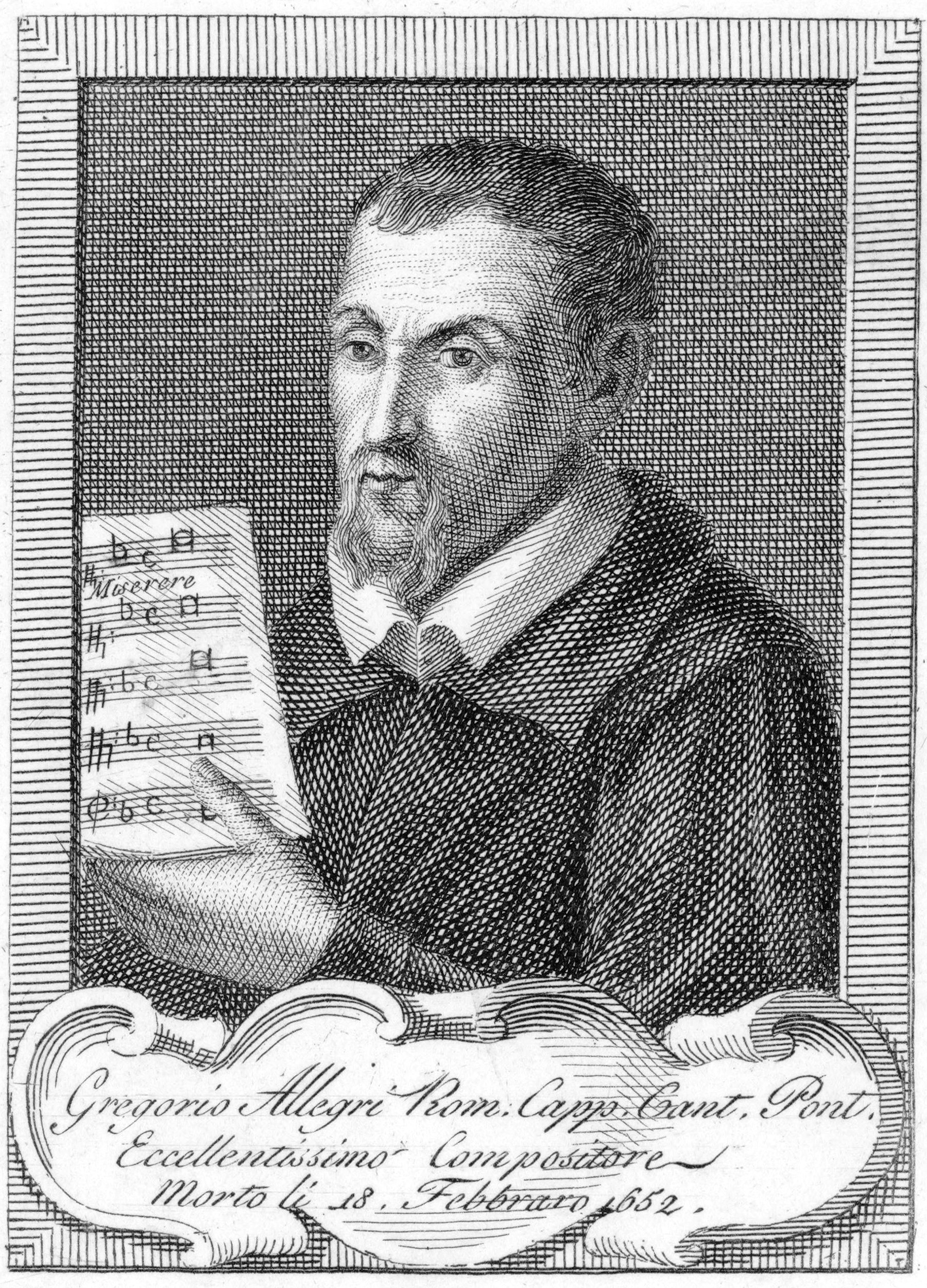

The year 1652 in music involved some significant events.

== Events ==
- Adam Drese becomes Kapellmeister to Duke Wilhelm IV of Saxe-Weimar.
- Anthoni van Noordt becomes the organist of Nieuwezijdskapel.
- Giovanni Antonio Pandolfi Mealli (1624-1687) becomes court musician at Innsbruck

== Publications ==
- Henry Du Mont – Cantica sacra, a collection of sacred music

== Classical music ==
- Denis Gaultier – Le Rhétorique des Dieux (the Eloquence of the Gods), a manuscript collection of 56 lute pieces

== Opera ==
- Antonio Bertali – Niobe
- Francesco Cavalli – Eritrea

== Births ==
- April 28 – Magdalena Sibylla of Hesse-Darmstadt, composer of hymns (died 1712)
- May 14 – Johann Philipp Förtsch, composer and doctor (died 1732)
- date unknown – Diego Xaraba, composer (died 1715)

== Deaths ==
- February 17 – Gregorio Allegri, Italian composer (born 1582)
- April 21 – Pietro Della Valle, traveller, composer and writer on music (born 1586)
- July 24 – Johann Weichmann, composer (born 1620)
- November – Charles Fleury, lutenist (born c.1605)
- date unknown – Filipe de Magalhães, choirmaster and composer (born c.1571)
