= 1647 in music =

The year 1647 in music involved some significant events.

== Events ==
- Soprano Anne Chabanceau de La Barre makes her operatic debut.

== Publications ==
- Constantin Huygens – Pathodia sacra et profana, a collection of psalms and songs, published in Paris
- Carlo Milanuzzi – Compieta intiera concertata for one, two, three, and four voices, Op. 23 (Venice: Alessandro Vincenti)

== Opera ==
- Luigi Rossi – Orfeo, premiered in Rome

== Births ==
- December 4 – Daniel Eberlin, composer and Kapellmeister (died c. 1715)
- date unknown – Pelham Humfrey, English composer and singer (died 1674)

== Deaths ==
- February 17 – Johann Heermann, hymn-writer (b. 1585)
- March 15 (bur.) – John Milton, amateur composer (b. 1562)
- December 31 – Giovanni Maria Trabaci, organist and composer (b. c. 1575)
- date unknown
  - Giovanni Battista Doni, musicologist (b. c. 1593)
  - Mateo Romero, composer (born 1575)
