= 1651 in music =

The year 1651 in music involved some significant events.

== Events ==
- none listed

== Publications ==
- Giovanni Battista Granata – Nuova scielta di capricci armonici..., a collection of guitar music, published in Bologna
- Claudio Monteverdi – Madrigali e canzonette a due e tre voci del signor Claudio Monteverde già Maestro di Cappella della Serenissima Republica di Venetia... Libro nono (Ninth book of madrigals for five voices) (Venice: Alessandro Vincenti), published posthumously
- Stefano Pasino – Motetti a 2. 3. 4. concertati..., Op. 6 (Venice: Francesco Magni for Gardano)
- John Playford – The English Dancing Master

== Classical music ==
- none listed

== Opera ==
- Francesco Cavalli – premier of La Calisto, Venice (November 28) and L'Eritrea

== Births ==
- February 25 – Johann Philipp Krieger, composer (died 1735)
- April 15 – Domenico Gabrielli, cellist and composer (died 1690)
- June – Johann Georg Ahle, organist and composer (died 1706)
- July 22 – Ferdinand Tobias Richter, organist and composer (died 1711)
- December 28 – Johann Krieger, organist and composer (died 1735)

== Deaths ==
- January 17 – Johannes Hieronymus Kapsberger, lutenist (born c. 1580)
- October 6 – Heinrich Albert (born 1604), German composer and poet
- November 18 – Bonifatio Ceretti, alto castrato (intended Endimione in La Calisto)
- December 17 – Ennemond Gaultier, French lutenist and composer (born c. 1575)
- December 19 – Giovanni Faustini, librettist for Francesco Cavalli (born 1615)
- probable – Martin Peerson, English composer, organist, and virginalist (born c. 1571)
