= Mirna (name) =

- Pronunciation: \m/i/-rna\, \mir-na\
- Gender: Female

Origin
- Origin: South Slavic
- Meaning: Peace, Tender

Mirna (Croatian "Mirna"; Serbian "Мирна") is a female name common among Croats and Serbs. Derived from the Slavic element mir, Mirna means "peaceful." It is often confused with the name "Myrna"(/myrrhna/), which is not Slavic in origin, but Celtic and means "beloved" and also "tender." In Circassian culture, Mirna means "This Eye": "Mir" stands for "this" and "Na" stands for "Eye".

== Notable people with the given name Mirna ==
- Mirna Deak (born 1974), Croatian basketball player
- Mirna Doris (1940–2020), Italian Canzone Napoletana singer
- Mirna Funk (born 1981), German journalist
- Mirna Esmeralda Hernández (born 1961), Mexican politician
- Mirna van der Hoeven (born 1948), Dutch sprinter
- Mirna Jukić (born 1986), Austrian swimmer of Croatian origin
- Mirna Louisa-Godett (born 1954), Prime Minister of the Netherlands Antilles
- Mirna Velázquez López (born 1957), Mexican politician
- Mirna Mazić (born 1985), Croatian basketball player
- Mirna Medaković (born 1985), Croatian actress
- Mirna Murr, Lebanese politician
- Mirna Ortiz (born 1987), Guatemalan racewalker
- Mirna Camacho Pedrero (born 1959), Mexican politician
- Mirna Radulović, Serbian singer-songwriter
- Mirna Valerio, American runner
- Mirna Rincón Vargas (born 1959), Mexican politician

== See also ==
- Merna
- Myrna
