= Merna =

Merna may refer to:

- Merna (name)
- Merna, Illinois, an unincorporated community in the United States
- Merna, Nebraska, a village in the United States
- Merna Mora, a pastoral lease in Australia
- Miren (Italian: Merna), an urbanized settlement in Slovenia, on the border with Italy
