= Standard (music) =

Commonly performed musical composition

In music, a standard is a musical composition of established popularity, considered part of the "standard repertoire" of one or several genres. Even though the standard repertoire of a given genre consists of a dynamic and partly subjective set of songs, these can be identified by having been performed or recorded by a variety of musical acts, often with different arrangements. In addition, standards are extensively quoted by other works and commonly serve as the basis for musical improvisation. Standards may "cross over" from one genre's repertoire to another's; for example, many jazz standards have entered the pop repertoire, and many blues standards have entered the rock repertoire.

Standards exist in the classical, popular and folk music traditions of all cultures. In the context of Western classical music, the standard repertoire constitutes most of what is considered the "teaching canon", i.e. the compositions that students learn in their academic training. The standard repertoire varies according to the different eras, movements and scenes within a genre, meaning that the extent to which a given composition is considered a standard or "repertoire piece" may vary greatly. However, some repertoires (e.g. concert piano) have become particularly static, giving rise to a divide between "standard-repertoire performers" and contemporary music advocates.

== Formal aspects (popular music) ==
Standards mostly possess "canonical" structures which pervade the repertoire. Popular standards in the Western tradition often have one of four basic song structures: strophic form (AAA), twelve-bar blues progression (AAB), thirty-two-bar form (AABA) or a verse–chorus form (ABAB).

== The standard repertoire (classical music) ==
In western-classical music, the standard repertoire, or the repertoire, refers to a large set of musical works that have been performed on numerous occasions by many orchestras, groups or interpreters across several countries over a long period of time. The pieces that conform the standard repertoire date from the Baroque Era until the late 20th century and follow the classical music traditional canons of composition and execution. In addition, because of their continuous presence in recordings and recital halls, the works from the standard repertoire are the most popular amongst the classical music audiences, and the performance of music that lies "outside the repertoire" generates much debate and discussion.

The works in the repertoire have become need-to-know pieces for orchestral and solo instrumentalists, singers and conductors, as they encounter them in concert programs, competition requirements, and auditions, both for acceptance into academic institutions and working positions. As a result, much of the repertoire has become part of the teaching canon. The term can be applied to any classical music genre, as in "the standard operatic repertoire", "the standard symphonic repertoire" or "the standard piano repertoire"; referring to the pieces within that genre that fulfill said characteristics.

=== Formal aspects and limitations ===
As the standard repertoire is deeply rooted in the western classical music tradition, the pieces included respect the characteristics, complexity, and performance practice of classical music established during the common-practice period, although it is possible to find exceptions. Due to the "inflexibility" of the traditional techniques of composition and performance and the arduous and unclear requirements to enter the repertoire, a division has arisen between advocates of contemporary music and/or music outside the repertoire and those who promote and protect the founded tradition.

=== Controversy ===
Although the term "standard repertoire" aims to encompass a set of established works, it is still subject to trends and the tastes of conductors, programmers, and performers. Old works might be rediscovered, new works may enter the repertoire through repeated performance and good audience response, and established works can be left out indefinitely based merely on time constraints. Because of the disparity and unpredictability of this process, the works in the repertoire might differ from one time-period or location to another, although the most popular and wide-spread works tend to prevail. Furthermore, because of the incapacity of the educational institutions and publishing companies to adapt quickly enough, works that seem of no importance today remain in the concert programs and teaching repertoire, and works we consider relevant are artificially kept out.

== See also ==
- Adult standards (radio format)
- Blues standard
- Jazz standard
- Pop standard (traditional pop)
- Great American Songbook
- Classical music
- List of operas in the standard repertoire
- Musical repertoire
