= Andrea Castagneri =

Italian luthier

- Born: 11 June 1696; Turin
- Died: 5 December 1747 (aged 51); Paris
- Occupation: Luthier
- Spouse: Ursula Gaffino
- Children: Jeanne; Marie-Catherine; Marie-Anne

Andrea Castagneri (Turin, 11 June 1696 – Paris, 5 December 1747) was an Italian luthier. He left Turin for Paris in 1720, in the service of Victor Amadeus I, Prince of Carignano in the Hôtel de Soissons, transferring in 1747 in rue des Prouvaires with his daughter Marie-Anne. He was married to Ursula Gaffino and they had three children: Jeanne, Marie-Anne and Marie-Catherine. Marie-Anne (1722-1787) established an important music publishing business in Paris. Castagneri's production, including violins, violas, cellos and viole da gamba is centered around 1740. One of his violins, dated 1735, was described in 1909 as being a flat model, with bold outline and varnish of good quality.

Several of his instruments survive and are played, for example, by the Quatuor Castagnéri (established in 1994) and by Myrna Herzog.
