= Mycenae (disambiguation) =

Mycenae is an ancient city in the Peloponnese, Greece.

Mycenae may also refer to:

- Mycenae (Crete), an archaeological site on the island of Crete, Greece
- Mycenae, New York, a hamlet in the United States
