= Myrna =

Myrna is the anglicized form of the Irish name Muirne and may refer to:

- Myrna Anselma (1936–2008), Dutch Antillean fencer
- Myrna Blyth (born 1939), American editor and writer
- Myrna Brown (1959–2007), African-American singer and songwriter best known as Screechy Peach
- Myrna Clark, New Democratic Party candidate, Canada
- Myrna Combellack, academic researcher and writer of the Institute of Cornish Studies
- Myrna Culbreath (born 1938), American science fiction writer
- Myrna Cunningham, Miskita feminist and indigenous rights activist from Nicaragua
- Myrna Dell (1924–2011), American actress, model, and writer
- Myrna Dey, Canadian writer and novelist
- Myrna Driedger, politician in Manitoba, Canada
- Myrna Fahey (1933–1973), American actress, played Maria Crespo in Walt Disney's Zorro
- Myrna Fyfe (born 1941), retired Canadian provincial level politician and hospital administrator
- Myrna Gopnik, Professor Emerita of Linguistics at McGill University
- Myrna Hague, Jamaican lovers rock and jazz singer and actress
- Myrna Hansen (born 1934), Miss USA 1953
- Myrna Herzog (born 1951), Brazilian-Israeli Viol player and conductor
- Myrna Katz, former South Africa cricketer
- Myrna Kostash (born 1944), Canadian writer and journalist
- Myrna Lamb (1930–2017), American playwright
- Myrna Lorrie (born 1940), Canadian country singer
- Myrna Loy (1905–1993), American film, television and stage actress
- Myrna MacAulay of Townshippers' Association, in Quebec, Canada
- Myrna Mack (1949–1990), Guatemalan anthropologist
- Myrna Narcisse, director general of the Ministry of Women's Condition in Haiti, died in 2010 earthquake
- Myrna Opsahl, killed by the Symbionese Liberation Army
- Myrna Phillips (born 1942), politician in Manitoba, Canada
- Myrna Sharlow (1893–1935), American soprano in operas and concerts
- Myrna Smith (1941–2010), American songwriter and singer
- Myrna Summers (born 1949), Gospel Music singer, Minister of Music in Glenn Dale, Maryland
- Myrna Vázquez (1935–1975), Puerto Rican actress and Boston activist
- Myrna Veenstra (born 1975), former field hockey player from The Netherlands
- Myrna Weber (born 1941), American model
- Myrna Williams (politician) (1929–2021), American political figure in Nevada
- Myrna Wooders, Canadian economist, contributor to public economic theory, network theory and game theory

== Fictional characters ==
- Myrna Minkoff, a friend character in the novel A Confederacy of Dunces
- Myrna Bookbottom, a polite British librarian with a violent alter-ego in the video game ‘’Freaky Flyers’’

== See also ==
- Merna
- Myna
- Myra
- Myrina (disambiguation)
