= Myrina =

Myrina may refer to:

Places and jurisdictions

- Myrina, Greece, capital of the Greek island of Lemnos
- Myrina (Aeolis), in Mysia, also called Sebastopolis, ancient city and bishopric on the coast of Mysia (now in Turkey)
- Myrina (Crete), a town of ancient Crete

Other

- Myrina (mythology), name of several female characters in Greek mythology
- Myrina (butterfly), a genus of butterflies
- Myrina, the first supertanker built in the UK
