= La púrpura de la rosa =

1701 opera in one act composed by Tomás de Torrejón y Velasco

Purpura de la rosa
- Opera by Tomás de Torrejón y Velasco
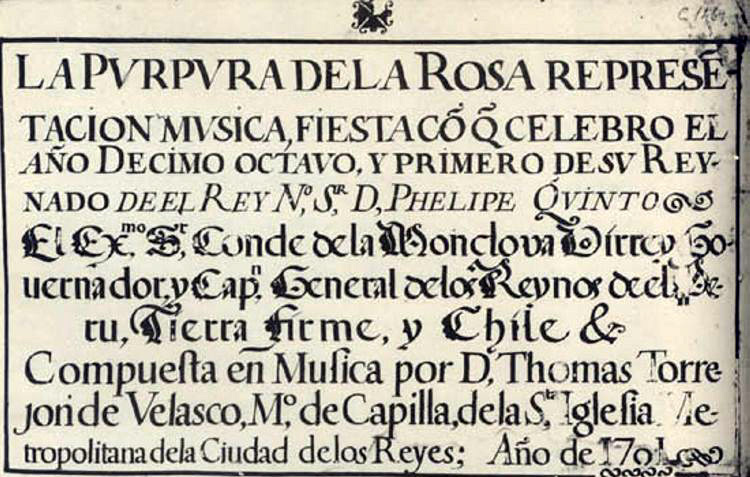
- Frontispiece from the original score
- Librettist: Pedro Calderón de la Barca
- Language: Spanish
- Based on: Ovid's tale of Venus and Adonis
- Premiere: 19 October 1701; Palace of the Viceroy, Lima

La púrpura de la rosa (The Blood of the Rose) is an opera in one act, composed by Tomás de Torrejón y Velasco to a Spanish libretto by Pedro Calderón de la Barca, a great writer of the Spanish Golden Age.

It is the first known opera to be composed and performed in the Americas and is Torrejón y Velasco's only surviving opera. La púrpura de la rosa was first performed in Lima in 1701 to celebrate the 18th birthday of Philip V and the first anniversary of his succession to the Spanish throne. The libretto, in polymetric verse and filled with lush mythological imagery, is a re-telling of the Ovidian tale of the loves of Venus and Adonis. Torrejón y Velasco was not the first to use Calderón's libretto. The text had previously been set for a theatrical pageant in honor of the marriage of Louis XIV and Maria Teresa of Spain in 1660, with music possibly written by Juan Hidalgo de Polanco, composer and master of music at the court of Madrid. With its erotic poetry and music, this setting was very popular at the Spanish court and had several revivals.

== Performance history ==
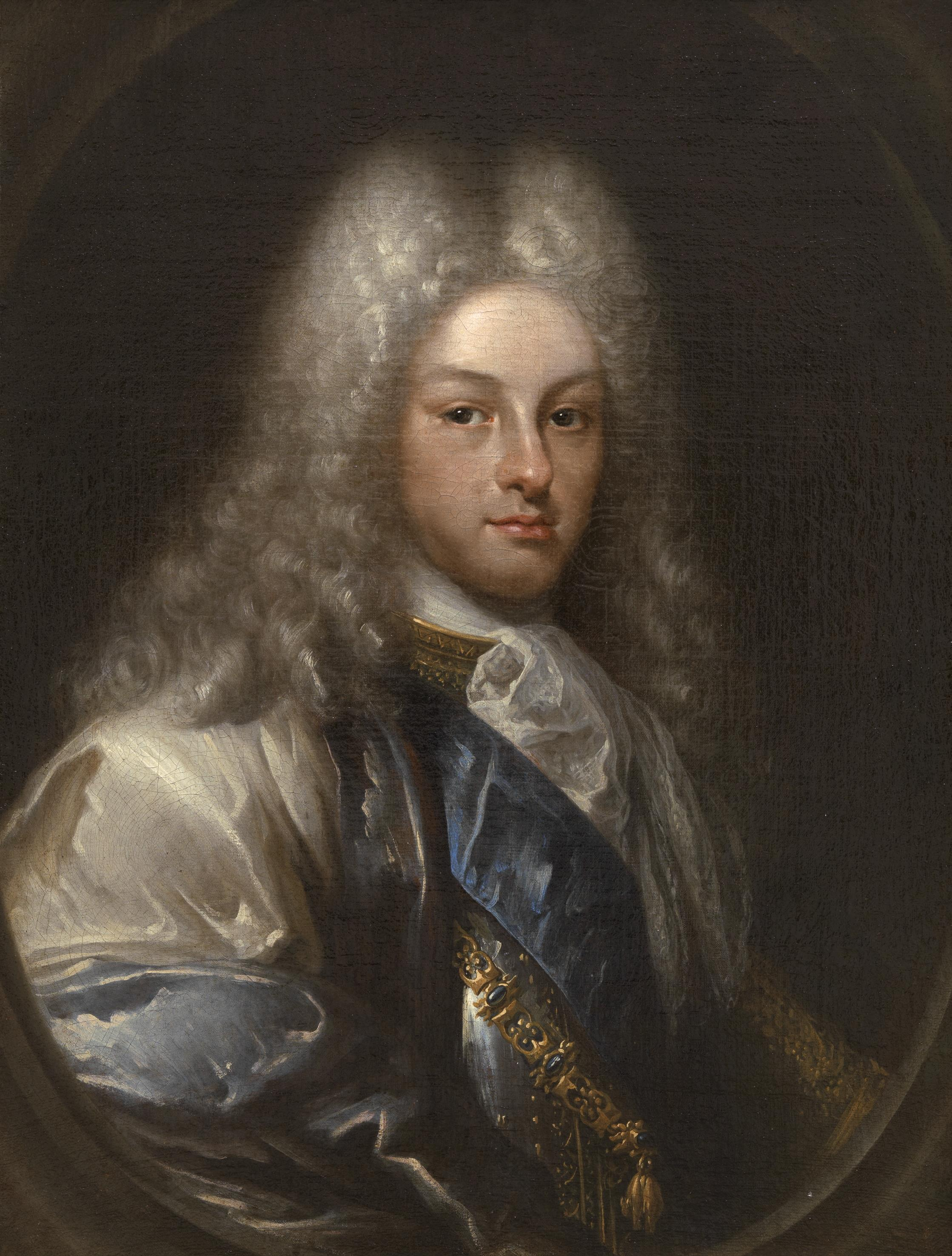
Philip V of Spain in a 1705 portrait by Miguel Jacinto Meléndez

The Viceroy of Peru, Don Melchor Portocarrero y Lasso de la Vega, instructed Torrejón to compose a piece of dramatic music for the Kingdom's celebration of King Philip V's 18th birthday and the first anniversary of his succession to the throne. La púrpura de la rosa was chosen as the subject. The work premiered on 19 October 1701 in the Palace of the Viceroy, Lima. The opera was revived in 1707, 1708, and 1731 in Peru and somewhat later in Mexico and has had several performances in modern times.

Its US premiere took place at Rosary College outside Chicago on 26 June 1992 in a production by the Baroque music ensemble Ars Musica Chicago. (Andrew Schultze, director and musicologist; Stephen Blackwelder, music director; Kate Lanham, choreographer) and soon thereafter at the Aveda Institute in Minneapolis on 28 October 1994 in a production by the Baroque ensemble Ex Machina. (James Middleton, director; Bob Skiba, choreographer; Barbara Weiss, music director; Louise Stein, musicologist/adviser).

In May 1999 it was performed at the Buskirk-Chumley Theatre in Bloomington, Indiana, as part of the Bloomington Early Music Festival and in partnership with Indiana University's Latin American Music Center and the Bloomington Area Arts Council (James Middleton, stage direction; Bernardo Illari, music edition and direction).

In October 1999, there were performances at Bâtiment des Forces motrices in Geneva and in Santiago, Chile. The Santiago performance by the ensemble Syntagma Musicum (conducted by Alejandro Reyes) marked the 150th anniversary of the Universidad de Santiago de Chile. The opera was also performed at the Teatro de la Zarzuela in Madrid in November 1999 in a co-production by the Teatro de La Zarzuela and the Grand Théâtre de Genève. (Óscar Araiz, director and choreographer; Gabriel Garrido, conductor). La púrpura de la rosa received its British stage premiere at the University of Sheffield Drama Studio on 27 February 2003, conducted and directed by Andrew Lawrence-King. The production received two more performances in Sheffield before touring to Manchester, Nottingham, Galway, and Dublin.

On 26 September 2013, La Purpura de la rosa received its Israeli premiere at the Abu Gosh Festival performed by Ensemble PHOENIX on period instruments and its vocal branch VOCE PHOENIX, conducted from the viola da gamba by Myrna Herzog, with staging by Regina Alexandrovskaya.

In 2015 La púrpura de la rosa was presented at the Musikfestspiele Potsdam Sanssouci, staged by Hinrich Horstkotte and conducted by Eduardo Egüez (Ensemble La Chimera).

== Roles ==
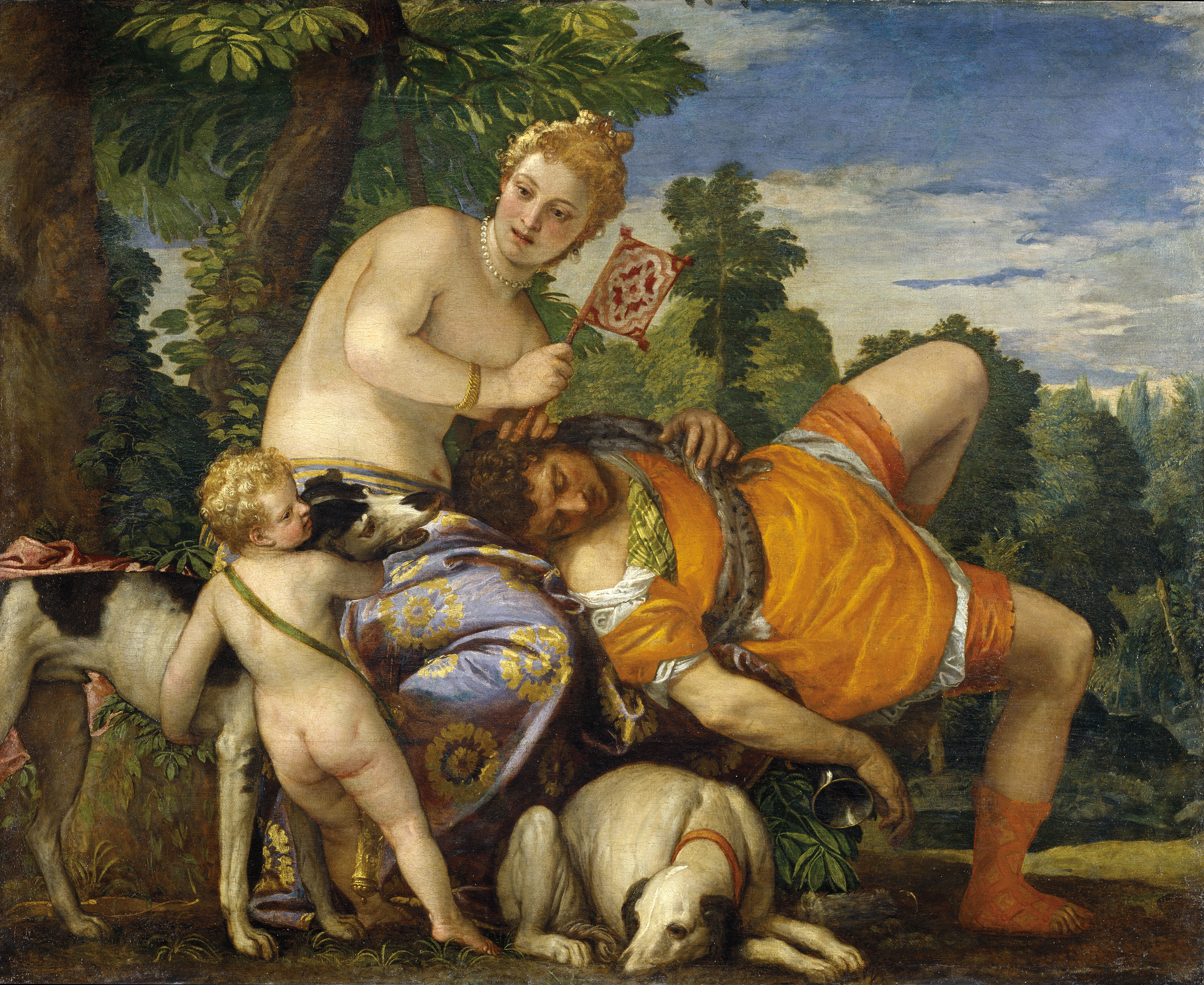
Venus and Adonis by Paolo Veronese (circa 1580). The painting, now in the Museo del Prado, may have been the inspiration for Calderón's libretto.

Role	Voice type
Venus	soprano
Adonis	soprano
Marte (Mars)	mezzo-soprano
Amor (Cupid)	soprano
Belona (Bellona)	mezzo-soprano
Dragón, a soldier	mezzo-soprano
Celfa, a peasant	soprano
Chato, a peasant	baritone
El Desengaño (Disillusion)	baritone
La Ira (Anger)	soprano
La Sospecha (Suspicion)	soprano
La Envidia (Envy)	countertenor
El Temor (Fear)	tenor
El Rencor (Bitterness)	?
Flora (nymph)	soprano
Cintia (nymph)	soprano
Clori (nymph)	soprano
Libia (nymph)	mezzo-soprano
Muses, soldiers and shepherds	chorus

== Synopsis ==
The opera is preceded by the customary loa (dedicatory prologue or allegorical paen) celebrating Philip V, and emphasizing his goodness and justice. In Apollo's Temple on Mount Parnassus, the Muses Calliope, Terpsichore and Urania, the personifications of Time (Tiempo) and Spain (España), and a chorus of the remaining six Muses sing to the glory of Spain and its new king. The loa ends with:

¡Viva Filipo, viva!

¡Viva el sucesor del imperio
que, puesto a sus plantas,
seguro afianza

su eterno blasón!

The ensuing opera recounts the love between Venus and Adonis, the jealousy of Mars, and his desire for revenge.

The drama opens in a forest where Venus has been hunting. Her nymphs rush onstage, crying that she is being chased by a wild boar. Adonis rushes to her aid. Venus faints in his arms as he carries her on-stage. When she recovers, Adonis learns her true identity. He explains that the incestuous circumstances of his birth have made him renounce love forever and that he must flee from her. As Venus starts to pursue Adonis, her lover, Marte, appears and questions her. Dissatisfied with her answers, he then interrogates her nymphs, eventually frightening one of them into describing Venus' rescue by Adonis. Belona, Marte's sister, arrives on Iris's rainbow and summons him to combat to distract him from his jealousy.

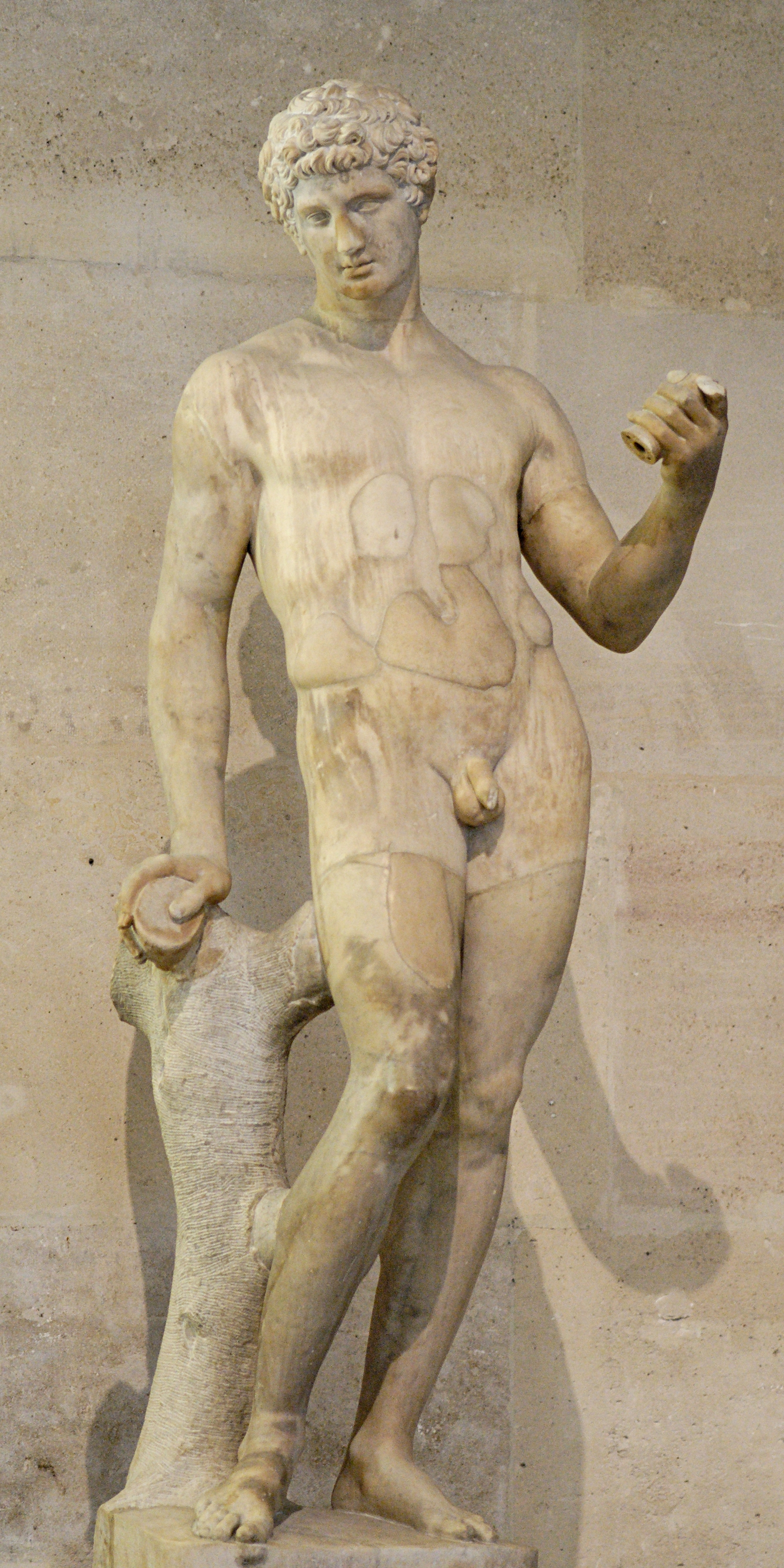
Adonis, Roman torso restored and completed by François Duquesnoy (1597–1643).

The peasants, Chato and Celfa, joke about marriage but are interrupted by a chorus of peasants exclaiming that the wild boar is on the loose. Adonis pursues the boar, but then tires and lies down to rest. Venus comes upon the sleeping Adonis and torn by the humiliation of having fainted in his arms and her growing desire for him, she dismisses her nymphs. She calls on Amor to help her and tells him about Adonis's renunciation of love. Amor shoots the sleeping Adonis in the heart with one of his golden arrows, infusing him with desire. When Adonis awakens, he is surprised to find Venus watching him, and sings of his terrible dream about a wild boar, a dream which foreshadows his death. Adonis praises Venus's beauty and confesses his attraction to her. Venus is unable to tear herself away from Adonis, and they reveal their mutual desire. Venus enters her garden of delights and Adonis follows her, welcomed by Celfa, Chato, and the nymphs.

The next scene finds Marte, Belona, Dragón and Belona's soldiers at the foot of a mountain. Marte is still jealous and distracted. Belona and Dragón try to humor him. Meanwhile, Amor is sneaking around in disguise, spying on Marte. He is eventually discovered hiding in the bushes and interrogated by Marte, who fails to recognize him, but is suspicious of his riddles about love. When Marte orders the soldiers to capture him, Amor escapes into a cleft in the mountain. The cleft then opens revealing the Prison of Jealousy. Shackled inside, is Desengaño (Disillusion), an old man dressed in animal skins. Marte and Dragón fearfully enter the grotto and find the masked personifications of Fear, Suspicion, Envy, Anger, and Bitterness. Desengaño and the masked figures warn Marte that when love is pursued it turns into disillusion. Desengaño holds up a magic mirror in which Marte sees Venus and Adonis embracing. Unable to face the truth, Marte runs away. There is a sudden earthquake, and the allegorical figures, the vision in the mirror, and the grotto all disappear.

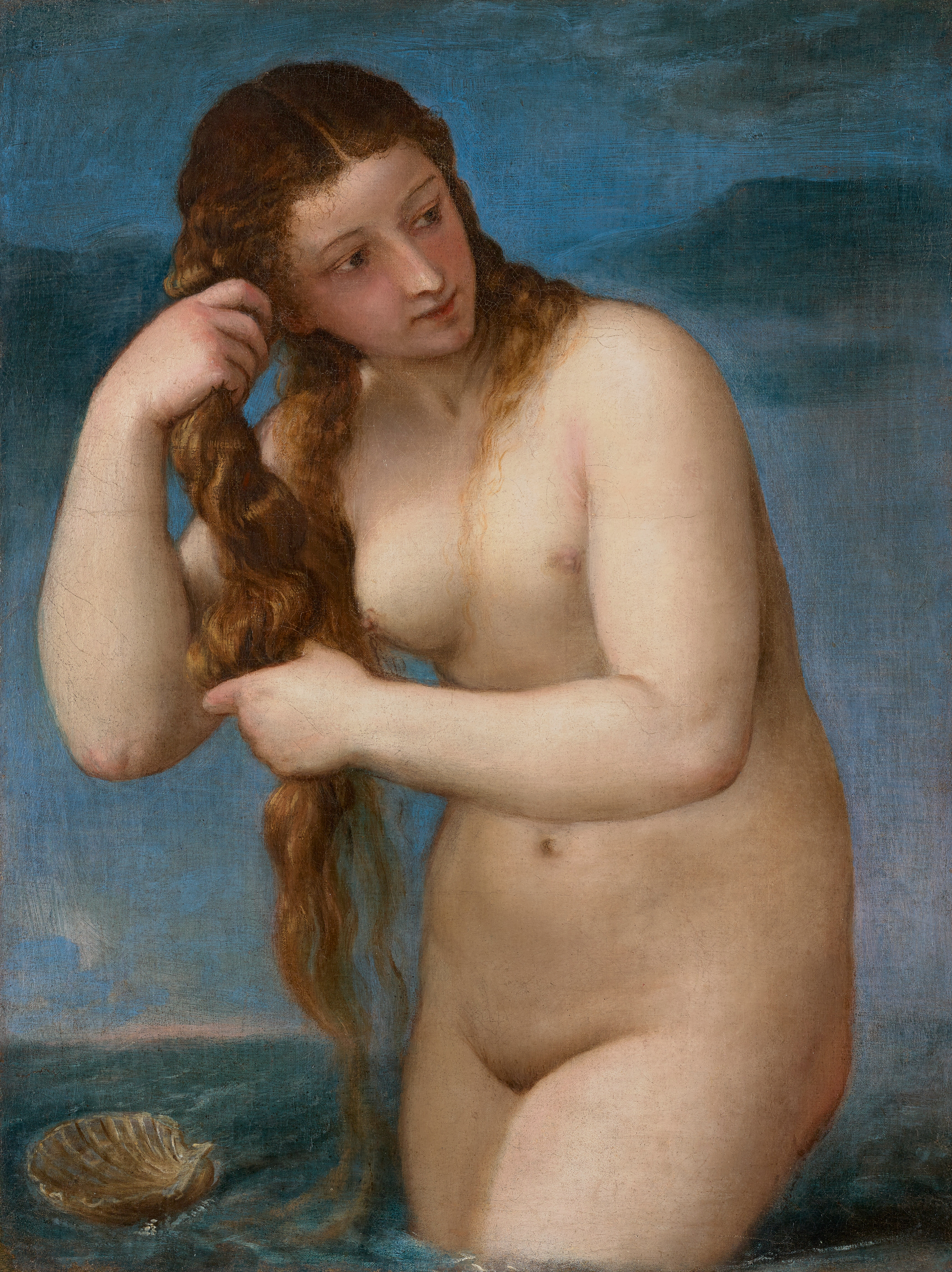
Venus Anadyomene by Titian (circa 1525).

In Venus's garden, Venus and Adonis delight in their illicit love. Adonis reclines in Venus's lap, while Chato, Celfa, and the nymphs, sing to the couple. Amor arrives and warns them of Marte's anger. Venus tells Adonis to return to the forest and plots to subdue Marte. When Marte arrives, the songs of the nymphs and vapors from the garden's fountains induce him to languor. Belona enters bringing a chorus of soldiers to counteract the spell cast by the nymphs' singing. Revived by the soldiers' songs, Marte heads for the forest looking for Adonis, who is again chasing the wild boar that had alarmed the peasants. Dragging Chato and Celfa off with him, Marte orders Dragón to tie them to a tree. Marte commands Megera, one of the Furies, to make the boar especially vicious, so that Adonis will die. Chato, Celfa, and Dragón have a comic argument about bullies and neglectful husbands, culminating with Dragón beating Celfa as Chato cheers him on.

In the forest, Adonis has been mortally wounded by the boar. Venus hears his cries and rushes to the scene. Seeing the distraught goddess with her hair loose, half naked, and her hands bloodstained, Belona is moved to pity and sings a lament. She and the nymph, Libia, try to convince Venus not to look at Adonis' body. The chorus describes how the blood of Adonis is turning the white roses around him red. Venus calls upon the gods with a lament. Marte cruelly describes the death of Adonis to Venus, and reveals his bloody body lying among the roses. Venus laments and faints. Amor then appears from the sky to announce that Jupiter has been moved by the plight of the lovers and will elevate them together to Mount Olympus – Adonis in the form of a flower (an anemone) and Venus as the Evening Star. Marte, Venus, Adonis, and Belona all comment, and as the sun sets, Venus and Adonis ascend to the heavens.

== Music ==
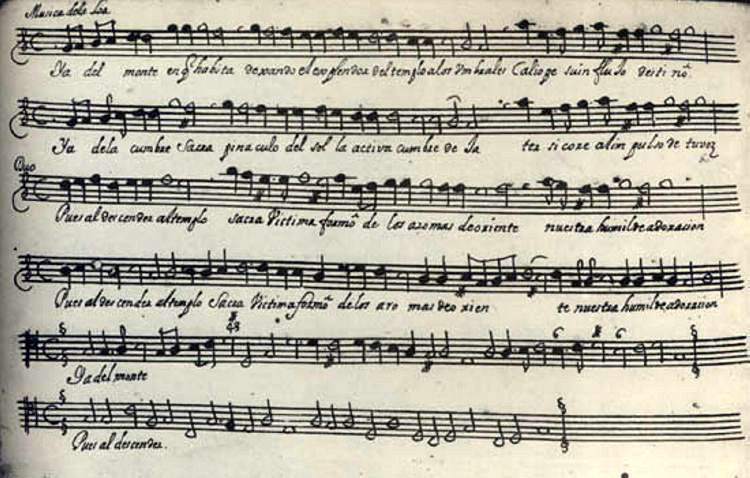
Fragment from the first page of the original score in Lima.

There is a single source of Torrejón's opera at the Biblioteca Nacional del Perú in Lima; a second manuscript preserved at the Bodleian Library at Oxford University in England does not contain music. A partial copy of the music in draft format, which closely follows the Lima source, was recently found in Cusco.

Musicologist Robert Stevenson published the first modern edition in Lima in 1976. A second one, by Don Cruickshank, is included in a scholarly study of the piece published by Reichenberger (Kassel) in 1990. A third publication of the music was issued in Madrid by the Instituto Complutense de Ciencias Musicales, under the editorship of Louis Stein (1999). Other editions, currently in manuscript, were prepared by Bernardo Illari for performances at Bloomington, Geneva, and Madrid in 1999, and by Diana Fernández Calvo for an Israeli production in 2013. Contrary to what was previously believed, the source provides music for the whole of Calderón's poem. It has some lacunas, including a missing chorus and a condensed presentation of the scene in Venus's garden (beginning at lines 1570, measure 2847 of the Kassel edition). Recent revivals of the opera have added the necessary music in an attempt to create what may have been heard in 1701.

The music by Torrejón conserves much of the character and the idiosyncrasies contained in the comedies of Calderón as previously set by Juan Hidalgo. Torrejón may have been one of Hidalgo's pupils and liberally used the music of his predecessor, in an extended dialogue with him. The score makes use of a variety of Spanish song types, with no Latin American musical influences. The erotic nature of the text is heightened by the use of dance rhythms, musical repetitions, and sensual lyrical lines. The exact instrumentation has not been found in Torrejón y Velasco's surviving original scores. However, the scores of other late seventeenth century musical plays in Spain suggest that the instruments would include harps, guitars, viols, violins, clarino and regular trumpets, drums, and castanets.

== Recordings ==
Torrejón y Velasco: La púrpura de la rosa - The Harp Consort

- Conductor: Andrew Lawrence-King
- Principal singers: Judith Malafronte (Venus), Ellen Hargis (Adonis), Maria del Mar Fernandez-Doval (Marte)
- Recording date: (published 1999)
- Label: Deutsche Harmonia Mundi - 0054727735523 (CD)

Torrejón y Velasco: La púrpura de la rosa - Clemencic Consort and La Capella Vocal Ensemble

- Conductor: René Clemencic
- Principal singers: Mieke Van der Sluis (Venus), Mark Tucker (Adonis), Pedro Liendo (Marte), Luiz Alves Da Silva (Amor), Elisabeth Magnus-Harnoncourt (Belona), Josep Benet (Chato), Lina Akerlund (Celfa), Andrea Martin (Dragón), John Winbigler (Fear), Louise Page (Envy), Pamela Mildenhall (Anger), Stephanie Prewitt (Suspicion), Josep Cabre (Disillusionment)
- Recording date: (published 2003)
- Label: Nuova Era - 1121548 (CD)

Torrejón y Velasco: La púrpura de la rosa - Ensemble Elyma, Madrigalists and chorus of the Teatro de la Zarzuela

- Conductor: Gabriel Garrido
- Principal singers: Isabel Monar (Venus), Graciela Oddone (Adonis), Cecilia Diaz (Marte), Isabel Alvarez (Amor), Alicia Borges (Belona), Susanna Moncayo (Dragón), Adriana Fernandez (Celfa), Marcello Lippi (Chato)
- Recording date:
- Label: K617 Records France - K617108 (CD)
