= Merna (name) =

Merna may refer to the following people:

Given name

- Merna Barry (born Minnie Bagelman; 1923–1976), American entertainer
- Merna Kennedy (1908–1944), American actress
- Merna Mohsen (born 1996), Egyptian footballer
- Merna Summers (born 1933), Canadian short story writer

Surname

- Gemma Merna (born 1984), English actress

== Arts and entertainment ==
- Merna is the name of the main character of the 1928 film The Circus by Charlie Chaplin.

== See also ==
- Mirna
- Myrna
