= Judith Malafronte =

American mezzo-soprano

Judith Malafronte is an American mezzo-soprano currently on the faculty at Indiana University Jacobs School of Music. For 15 years she taught courses at Yale University in literature and opera. She is the winner of several top awards in Italy, Spain, Belgium and the US, including the Grand Prize at the International Vocal Competition 's-Hertogenbosch, Holland in 1983.

Malafronte earned an A.B. with honors from Vassar College and the M.A. from Stanford University. Malafronte also studied at the Eastman School of Music, with Mlle. Nadia Boulanger in Paris and Fontainebleau, and with Giulietta Simionato in Milan as a Fulbright scholar.

She has recorded for major labels in a broad range of repertoire, from medieval chant to contemporary music and her writings have appeared in Opera News, Stagebill, Islands, Early Music America Magazine, Schwann Inside and Opus.
