= Tomás de Torrejón y Velasco =

Spanish composer, musician and organist

Tomás de Torrejón y Velasco Sánchez (23 December 1644 – 23 April 1728) was a Spanish composer, musician and organist based in Peru, associated with the American Baroque.

== Life ==
Torrejón y Velasco was born in Villarrobledo and spent his childhood in the town Fuencarral (now a district of Madrid), the birthplace of his father, Miguel de Torrejón, a huntsman in Philip IV of Spain's employ. In 1658, while still in Spain, he entered into the service of Pedro Fernández de Castro y Andrade, Count of Lemos, who later became the viceroy of Peru. In 1667, he traveled to Lima along with the new viceroy, as one of the viceroy's 113 personal attendants. From 21 November 1667 until 1672 he was superintendent of the armoury at Lima. In 1673 he was appointed magistrate and chief justice of Chachapoyas province, a position he held for four years. In 1676 he was appointed maestro de capilla at the Cathedral of Lima, replacing Juan de Araujo. He remained in that position until his death more than fifty years later in 1728. Torrejón seems to have been deeply religious, and adhered to the precepts of the Catholic Church as usual at the times for someone in his position. Married twice (his first wife died) he had a total of six children, five of whom entered religious orders. He died in Lima.

Torrejón's works are some of the most important to the Spanish Baroque movement in the American colonies. Throughout his career as a composer he received wide acclaim; his villancicos were known as far away as Guatemala, and at both Trujillo and Cuzco his opinions were solicited before crucial musical decisions were taken.

Fifteen of his original manuscripts are preserved in the historical archives of the Cathedral of Guatemala. He is the author of the first known opera written in America, La púrpura de la rosa (1701). His rorro (lullaby) was still sung in Cuzco many years after his death. Of particular interest are his polychoral compositions. A second organ was installed in the Lima Cathedral in 1680 and Torrejón y Velasco composed polychoral villancicos for the inauguration ceremony.

== List of works ==
=== Opera ===
- La púrpura de la rosa (1701)

=== Other works ===
(with basso continuo unless stated otherwise)

- A este sol peregrino, 4vv
- Aladas jerarquías a quien toca, 7vv
- Angélicas milicias, 12vv
- Ah Señor, que se acerca, 4vv
- Atención que para hacer en todo cabal la fiesta, 4vv
- Aves flores, 11vv (1683)
- Ave verum corpus, 4vv, icpl
- Barquero que surcas, 1v
- Cantarico que vas a la fuente, 4vv (1678?)
- Cuando el bien que adoro, 2vv
- Cuatro plumajes airosos, 4vv
- Desta Rosa tan bella, 2vv
- Desvelado dueño mío, 7vv
- Dixit Dominus, 10vv
- Enigma soy viviente, 2vv
- Es mi Rosa bella, vv (1679?)
- Jilguerillo que cantas gimiendo, 2vv
- Ha de el ver, 3vv
- Incipit Lamentatio, lamentation for Wednesday of Holy Week, 7vv
- Incógnito barquero que surcas, 1v
- Luceros volad, 1–2vv, instruments
- Magnificat sexti toni, 12vv
- Nisi Dominus, 3vv
- Regem cui omnia vivunt, Invitatory for the Office of the Death, 8vv
- Si el alba sonora, 2vv (1719)
- Ténganmele señores, 4vv
- Triste caudal de lágrimas, 2vv
