= Myrna Herzog =

Israeli musician (born 1951)

- מירנה הרצוג
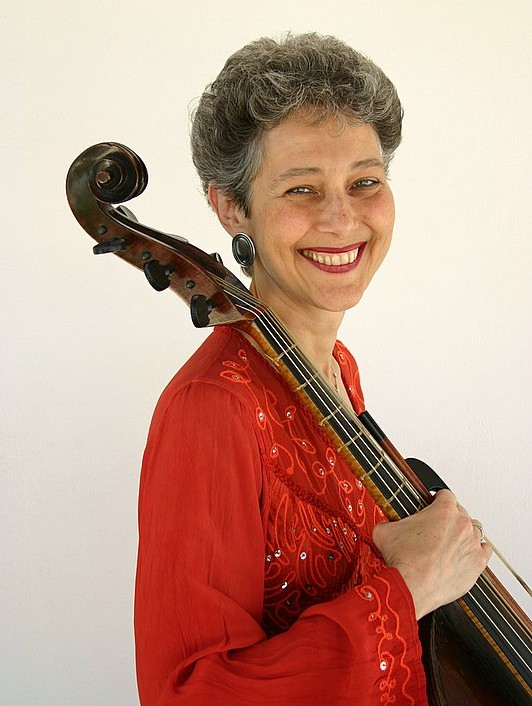
- Myrna Herzog (2005)
- Born: December 1, 1951 (age 74); Brazil
- Citizenship: Israeli
- Education: Bar-Ilan University, Israel (Doctorate in Music)
- Occupations: Musician, Conductor, Musicologist
- Years active: 1972-present
- Organization: Ensemble PHOENIX
- Known for: Early music performance and conducting
- Works: Recordings and musicological publications
- Instruments: Viola da gamba, viola, baroque cello
- Website: phoenixearlymusic

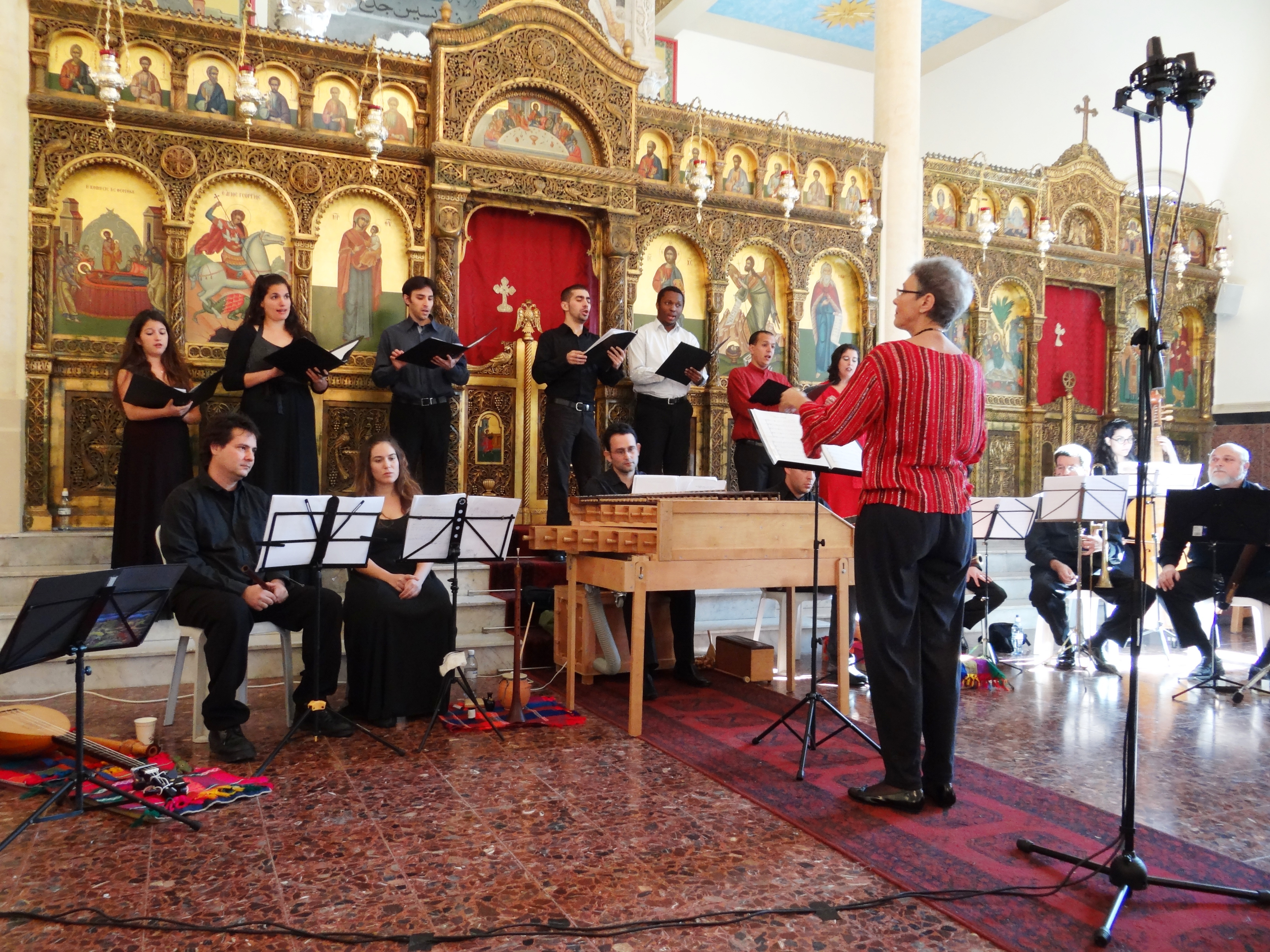
Mirna Herzog conducts a concert with the Phoenix Ensemble Orchestra in 2011 in Haifa

Myrna Herzog (Hebrew: מירנה הרצוג; born 1 December 1951) is a Brazilian-born Israeli musician, conductor, teacher and early music researcher. She is a player of the viola da gamba and baroque cello.

== Music career ==
Herzog started her professional career in 1972 as one of the winners of the Young Soloists competition of the Brazilian Symphony Orchestra (OSB). Her early music involved the groups Kalenda Maya (1970–72) and Pro-Arte Antiqua (1971–74). In 1973 she founded Quadro Cervantes with Rosana Lanzelotte. In 1983 she founded Brazil's first Baroque Orchestra Academia Antiqua Pro-Arte. In 1992, Herzog immigrated to Israel where she taught the first generation of sabra viola da gamba players.

Herzog studied the viol with Judith Davidoff and Wieland Kuijken. Since 1998, she has been the musical director and conductor of the Ensemble PHOENIX of early instruments.

Herzog has also worked in opera. She transcribed and staged the 13th-century Play of Daniel and the Baroque opera La púrpura de la rosa.

As a viola da gamba soloist, Myrna has performed throughout Europe, South America, the US, and Israel. She participated in the Israeli premiere of the Passions (Bach) with the Israel Philharmonic, performing solos with the viola da gamba. Myrna Herzog has recorded for labels as a conductor and as a performer on the viol, quinton, vielle, baroque cello, and modern cello. She has a doctorate degree in music from Bar-Ilan University. In February 2024, Herzog held workshops on baroque music for conductors in Brazil and at the Royal Academy of Music in London.

== Recordings ==
- Quadro Cervantes, Música Medieval, Renascentista e Barroca. Brazil 1979. Vinyl, Continental (3) – 1-35-404-012
- Canto Lunar, Music by Denise Emmer. Vinyl 1982 RGE – 308.6029
- Quadro Cervantes, Telemann. Brazil 1984. Vinyl, Barclay- 4192621
- Concerto BHU. Quadro Cervantes, Coro de Câmera Pro-Arte, Rosana Lanzelotte, Settecento (3xLP, Box) no number 1989
- François Couperin: Pièces de Clavecin à deux violes. Myrna Herzog, Giomar Sthel, Ensemble PHOENIX. Tratore 2020.
- Wieland Kuijken live in Rio. Wieland Kuijken, Myrna Herzog, Rosana Lanzelotte. Recorded in 1988. Released Tratore 2020.
- Uri Brener: Spanish Lamento. Ensemble PHOENIX & Myrna Herzog. Tratore 2021
- BACH GOLDBERG VARIATIONS arranged by Bernard Labadie. Ensemble PHOENIX & Myrna Herzog. Tratore 2022
- Hidden Pathways: David Loeb and others. 2022 Centaur Records Inc, CRC 3920
- CHOOSE LIFE, Music for solo viola da gamba. Tratore 2022.
- Bachiana Mineira (1983) de Calimério Soares (Brasil, 1944-2011) para viola da gamba solo. Gravado no CD Toccata de 2001.

== Publications ==
Herzog's articles have appeared in several journals and books on musicology and musical instrument studies, including the Viola da Gamba Society Journal, the Galpin Society Journal, and Music of Colonial Brazil.
