= Mycenae (Crete) =

Coordinates: 35°30′40″N 23°38′04″E

Mycenae or Mykenai (Ancient Greek: Μυκῆναι) was a town of ancient Crete, the foundation of which was attributed by an historian of the Augustan age to Agamemnon. Jean Hardouin proposed to read Mycenae for Myrina, which is mentioned as a city of Crete in the text of Pliny the Elder.

Its site is tentatively located near the modern Selli, Kastelli. The editors of the Barrington Atlas of the Greek and Roman World also tentatively accept the association of Mycenae with Pliny's Myrina.
