= 1984 in Nordic music =

The following is a list of notable events and releases that happened in Nordic music in 1984.

== Events ==
  - The Eurovision Song Contest 1984, held in Luxembourg, is won by the Swedish entry, "Diggi-Loo Diggi-Ley", performed by Herreys. Denmark finish in 4th place, Finland 9th and Norway 17th.
- August – Finnish power metal band Stratovarius is formed, under the name "Black Water".
- September – Lars H.U.G. releases his first solo album, City Slang.
- unknown date – Kirka receives his first gold disc for his album Hengaillaan, and is awarded the Emma, the most important Finnish music prize, for Best Male Singer.

== Classical works ==
- Ulf Grahn – Symphony no 2
- Knut Nystedt – Missa brevis
- Aulis Sallinen – Kuningas lähtee Ranskaan (opera)

== Hit singles ==
- Åge Aleksandersen – "Lys og varme"
- Stefan Borsch – "Det är ju dej jag går och väntar på" (#32 Sweden; Swedish version of "Det' lige det")
- Agneta Fältskog – "If I Thought You'd Ever Change Your Mind" (#2 Sweden; #11 UK)
- Marie Fredriksson – "Ännu doftar kärlek" (#18 Sweden)
- Carola Häggkvist – "Tommy tycker om mig" (#9 Norway; #10 Sweden)
- Hot Eyes – "Det' lige det"
- Nanna Lüders Jensen – "Buster"

== Eurovision Song Contest ==
- Denmark in the Eurovision Song Contest 1984
- Finland in the Eurovision Song Contest 1984
- Norway in the Eurovision Song Contest 1984
- Sweden in the Eurovision Song Contest 1984

== Film and television music ==
- Björn Isfält – Ronja Rövardotter
- Bo Holten – Tro, håb og kærlighed

== Births ==
- 14 February – Víkingur Ólafsson, Icelandic pianist
- 1 September – Ludwig Göransson, Swedish Academy-Award winning film score composer

== Deaths ==
- 10 January – Thore Jederby, Swedish jazz bassist, record producer, and radio broadcaster (born 1913)
- 28 July – Ahti Sonninen, Finnish composer (born 1914)
- 12 August – Arild Sandvold, Norwegian organist, choir conductor and composer (born 1895)
- 3 September – Rolf Gammleng, Norwegian classical violinist and organizational leader (born 1898)
- 13 September – Konsta Jylhä, Finnish folk musician (born 1910)
- 13 October – Kjeld Bonfils, Danish pianist and vibraphonist (born 1918)
- 8 November – Carl Gustav Sparre Olsen, Norwegian classical violinist and composer (born 1903)

== See also ==
- 1984 in Denmark
- 1984 in Iceland
- 1984 in Norwegian music
- 1984 in Sweden
