= 1973 in Nordic music =

The following is a list of notable events and releases that happened in Scandinavian music in 1973.

== Events ==
- 3 March – The Spellemannprisen (sometimes called the "Norwegian Grammy Awards") are presented for the first time - for the recording year 1972. Winners include Erik Bye, Birgitte Grimstad, Sigurd Jansen and Egil Monn-Iversen.
- 7 April – The Eurovision Song Contest is held in Luxembourg, and is won by the home country. Of the Scandinavian entries, Sweden finish 5th, Finland 6th and Norway 7th.
- unknown date – During a visit to Norway, where he represents UNICEF, American singer Danny Kaye appears on the Norwegian TV show Lørdagskveld med Erik Bye, performing the popular children's song "Hompetitten".

== New works ==
- Ulf Grahn – Two Dances. Dance of the Shapes, Dance of the Island
- Gunnar Kvaran – Six Icelandic Folk Songsfor cello and piano
- Lars-Erik Larsson – Aubade

== Top hit singles ==
- Björn & Benny, Agnetha & Anni-Frid – "Ring Ring" (#1 Denmark, Sweden)
- Hoola Bandoola Band – "På väg" (#1 Sweden)
- Schytts – "Aj, aj, aj"
- Kim Larsen – "Nanna"

== Hit albums ==
- Sebastian – Over havet under himlen (#1 Denmark)

== Recordings ==
- Þrjú á Pálmi – Þuríður & Pálmi
- Sanne Salomonsen – Sanne Salomonsen (debut album)
- Vuosikirja 1973 (compilation album)

== Eurovision Song Contest ==
- Finland in the Eurovision Song Contest 1973
- Norway in the Eurovision Song Contest 1973
- Sweden in the Eurovision Song Contest 1973

== Film and television music ==
- Charles Redland – Anderssonskans Kalle i busform

== Musical films ==
- Ragnarock Festival 1973

== Births ==
- 23 February – Linda Ulvaeus, Swedish singer, daughter of Björn Ulvaeus and Agnetha Fältskog
- 3 June – Tonmi Lillman, Finnish rock musician (died 2012)

== Deaths ==
- 19 March – Lauritz Melchior, Danish-born Wagnerian tenor (born 1890)
- 6 May – Ola Isene, Norwegian opera singer (baritone) and actor (born 1898)
- 11 May – Odd Grüner-Hegge, Norwegian conductor and composer (born 1899)
- 26 August – Ivar Widner, Swedish military composer (born 1891)
- 14 November – Lulu Ziegler, Danish actress and singer (born 1903)

== See also ==
- 1973 in Denmark
- 1973 in Iceland
- 1973 in Norwegian music
- 1973 in Sweden
