= 1945 in Nordic music =

The following is a list of notable events and compositions of the year 1945 in Nordic music.

== New works ==
- Uuno Klami – Symphony No. 2
- Paul von Klenau – Symphony No. 9
- Rued Langgaard
  - Symphony No. 10 Hin Tordenbolig, BVN. 298
  - Symphony No. 11 Ixion, BVN. 303
- Lars-Erik Larsson – Symphony No. 3

== Popular music ==
- Eric Christiansen & Anker Hansen – "Når det kommer en båt med bananer", sung by Arve Opsahls
- Ulf Peder Olrog – "Schottis på Valhall"
- Knudåge Riisager & Svend Møller-Kristensen – "Danmarks Frihedssang (En Vinter lang og mørk og haard)"

== Film music ==
- Kai Normann Andersen – Trötte Teodor
- Sven Gyldmark – De røde enge
- Knudåge Riisager – Niels Ebbesen

== Births ==
- 25 April – Björn Ulvaeus, singer-songwriter (ABBA)
- 13 May – Lasse Berghagen, Swedishsinger/songwriter (died 2023)
- 13 November – Knut Riisnæs, jazz musician, arranger and composer (died 2023)
- 15 November – Anni-Frid Lyngstad, singer (ABBA)

== Deaths ==
- 5 January – Viking Dahl, Swedish composer (born 1895)
- 11 May – Edvard Sylou-Creutz, Norwegian pianist, composer and radio personality (born 1881).
- 12 July – Bjørn Talén, Norwegian opera singer (born 1890)
- 19 November – Ruth Almén, Swedish pianist, poet and composer (born 1870)
- 22 December – Johan Austbø, Norwegian teacher, dancer, poet, composer, and singer (born 1879)
- 10 September – Väinö Raitio, Finnish composer (born 1891)

== See also ==
- 1945 in Denmark
- 1945 in Iceland
- 1945 in Norwegian music
- 1945 in Sweden
