= Violin Concerto (disambiguation) =

A violin concerto is a composition for violin and orchestra.

Violin Concerto may also refer to:

- Violin Concerto (Adams)
- Violin Concerto (Adès)
- Violin Concerto (Barber)
- Violin Concerto (Bates)
- Violin Concerto (Beethoven)
- Violin Concerto (Berg)
- Violin Concerto (Bergsma)
- Violin Concerto (Brahms)
- Violin Concerto (Britten)
- Violin Concerto (Bruch)
- Violin Concerto (Carter)
- Violin Concerto (Chávez)
- Violin Concerto (Davies)
- Violin Concerto (Dvořák)
- Violin Concerto (Elfman)
- Violin Concerto (Elgar)
- Violin Concerto (Fauré)
- Violin Concerto (Glass)
- Violin Concerto (Glazunov)
- Violin Concerto (Higdon)
- Violin Concerto (Khachaturian)
- Violin Concerto (Korngold)
- Violin Concerto (Ligeti)
- Violin Concerto (MacMillan)
- Violin Concerto (Mendelssohn)
- Violin Concerto (Nielsen)
- Violin Concerto (Panufnik)
- Violin Concerto (Ponce)
- Violin Concerto (Previn)
- Violin Concerto (Ries)
- Violin Concerto (Riisager)
- Violin Concerto (Rorem)
- Violin Concerto (Rouse)
- Violin Concerto (Rózsa)
- Violin Concerto (Rubinstein)
- Violin Concerto (Salonen)
- Violin Concerto (Schoenberg)
- Violin Concerto (Schumann)
- Violin Concerto (Sessions)
- Violin Concerto (Sibelius)
- Violin Concerto (Somervell)
- Violin Concerto (Strauss)
- Violin Concerto (Stravinsky)
- Violin Concerto (Tchaikovsky)
- Violin Concerto (Tower)
- Violin Concerto (Walton)
- Violin Concerto (Zwilich)
- Nicholas Maw: Violin Concerto, a 1999 recording by Joshua Bell of a composition by Nicholas Maw

== See also ==
- List of compositions for violin and orchestra
