= 1984 in Norwegian music =

The following is a list of notable events and releases of the year 1984 in Norwegian music.

== Events ==
=== April ===
- 13 – The 11th Vossajazz started in Vossavangen, Norway (April 13 – 15).

=== May ===
- 23 – 12th Nattjazz started in Bergen, Norway (May 23 – June 6).

=== June ===
- 27 – The 15th Kalvøyafestivalen started at Kalvøya near by Oslo.

== Albums released ==
=== Unknown date ===
R

Terje Rypdal

- Eos (ECM Records), with David Darling

S

Thorgeir Stubø

- Live at Jazz Alive (Odin Records)

Øystein Sunde

- I Husbukkens Tegn (Odin Records)

== Deaths ==
August

- 12 – Arild Sandvold, organist, composer, and choir conductor (born 1895).

September

- 3 – Rolf Gammleng, classical violinist and organizational leader (born 1898).

November

- 8 – Carl Gustav Sparre Olsen, classical violinist and composer (born 1903).

== Births ==
January

- 4 – Trond Bersu, jazz drummer.
- 20 – Jorun Stiansen, pop singer and artist.

February

- 12 – Aylar Lie, singer and actress.
- 20 – Mari Kvien Brunvoll, singer and composer.

April

- 4 – Steinar Aadnekvam, jazz guitarist.
- 10 – Anders Brørby, composer and sound artist.
- 26 – Andrea Rydin Berge, jazz singer and pianist

May

- 25 – Marion Raven, singer and songwriter.
- 28 – Ina Wroldsen, singer and songwriter.
- 29 – Jo Berger Myhre, jazz upright bassist, Splashgirl.

June

- 18 – Frida Ånnevik, jazz and folk singer.

July

- 8 – Jo Skaansar, jazz upright bassist and composer.
- 13 – Ida Maria, rock guitarist, singer, and songwriter.

August

- 14 – Kristoffer Kompen, jazz trombonist.

September

- 20 – Lars Vaular, rapper and songwriter.

October

- 3 – Marika Lejon, singer and songwriter.
- 17 – Anja Eline Skybakmoen, jazz singer and composer.

November

- 22 – Nathalie Nordnes, singer and songwriter.
- 27 – Jon Kristian Fjellestad, organist and composer.

December

- 17 – Jørgen Mathisen, jazz saxophonist and clarinetist.

== See also ==
- 1984 in Norway
- Music of Norway
- Norway in the Eurovision Song Contest 1984
