= 1891 in Nordic music =

The following is a list of notable events that occurred in the year 1891 in Nordic music.

== Events ==
- 10 May – Danish composer Carl Nielsen marries fellow Dane, artist and sculptor Anne Marie Brodersen, in St Mark's English Church, Florence, Italy.
- unknown date – Swedish composer Hanna Hallberg marries church musician Nils Peter Norlind.

== New works ==
- Hugo Alfvén – Till Mamma af Hugo Julen
- Elfrida Andrée – Organ Symphony in B minor
- Edvard Grieg – Lyric Pieces, Book V, Opus 54
- Andreas Hallén – I skymningen (At Dusk)
- Carl Nielsen – Five Piano Pieces, Opus 3
- Wilhelm Peterson-Berger – Berceuse
- Amanda Röntgen-Maier –
- Jean Sibelius – Seven Runeberg Songs (first four)

== Popular music ==
- August Ludvig Storm & Johannes Alfred Hultman" – Tack, min Gud, för vad som varit"

== Births ==
- 27 February (Old Style)/15 February – Issay Dobrowen, Russian-Norwegian pianist, conductor and composer (died 1953)
- 15 April – Väinö Raitio, Finnish composer (died 1945)
- 19 April – Henrik Adam Due, US-Norwegian violinist (died 1966)
- 30 May – August Schønemann, Norwegian singer, actor and comedian (died 1925)

== Deaths ==
- 8 January – Fredrik Pacius, German-born Finnish conductor and composer (born 1809)
- 3 June – Balduin Dahl, Danish conductor and composer (born 1834)
- 28 April – Cora Nyegaard, Danish composer (born 1812)
- 29 September – Joseph Glæser, German-born Danish organist and composer (born 1809)

== See also ==
- 1891 in Denmark
- 1891 in Norwegian music
- 1891 in Sweden
