= 1896 in Nordic music =

The following is a list of notable events that occurred in the year 1896 in Nordic music.

== Events ==
- 18 March – Danish composer Carl Nielsen conducts a performance of his First Symphony in Dresden, resulting in the start of his international success.
- 26 May – Jean Sibelius's choral work Hymn is premiered by an amateur choir at a memorial service in Helsinki.

== New works ==
- Eyvind Alnæs – Symphony No. 1
- August Enna – Aucassin og Nicolette (opera)
- Edvard Grieg
  - Lyric Pieces, Book VIII, Op. 65
  - Symphonic Dances
- Andreas Hallén – Hexfällan (opera)
- Johan Halvorsen
  - Air norvégien, Op. 7
  - Vasantasena
- Carl Nielsen – Hymnus amoris (cantata)
- Jean Sibelius
  - Lemminkäinen Suite
  - The Maiden in the Tower
- Wilhelm Stenhammar – Excelsior!

== Popular music ==
- Sigurd Lie – "Sne (Snow)" (setting of poem by Helge Rode)
- Christian Sinding – "Frühlingsrauschen"

== Births ==
- 20 January – Elmer Diktonius, Finnish poet and composer (died 1979)
- 26 July – Alfred Maurstad, Norwegian actor, director, singer and fiddle player (died 1967)
- 3 November – Trygve Lindeman, Norwegian cellist and music teacher (died 1961)
- 30 December – Hans Stenseth, Norwegian flautist (died 1994)

== Deaths ==
- 1 August – Wilhelm Herman Barth, Danish musician and composer (born 1813)
- 21 February – Fritz Arlberg, Swedish operatic baritone and composer (born 1830)
- 13 December – Emma Dahl, Norwegian opera singer and composer (born 1819)

== See also ==
- 1896 in Denmark
- 1896 in Norwegian music
- 1896 in Sweden
