= 1983 in Nordic music =

The following is a list of notable events and releases that happened in Nordic music in 1983.

== Events ==
- 14 March – Swedish band Europe release their first album, Europe, on Hot Records.
- 30 May – Former ABBA singer Agnetha Fältskog releases her first English-language solo album, Wrap Your Arms Around Me.
- unknown date
  - 25-year-old Esa-Pekka Salonen replaces Michael Tilson Thomas as conductor of the Philharmonia Orchestra when the latter is taken ill just before a performance. Salonen immediately emerges from obscurity. In the same year he co-founds the Avanti! Chamber Orchestra in Finland.
  - Per Nørgård's opera-ballet Siddhartha, with libretto by Ole Sarvig, originally written in the mid-1970s, is premièred at the Royal Opera in Stockholm.
  - Swedish band Rymdimperiet changes its name to Imperiet.

== New works ==
- Magnus Lindberg
  - Ablauf
  - Zona
- Per Nørgård – Det guddommelige Tivoli (The Divine Circus) (opera)

== Hit singles ==
- ABBA – "Thank You for the Music" (re-release; #2 South Africa; #7 Argentina)
- Kikki Danielsson – "Varför är kärleken röd?"
- Electric Banana Band – "Bananknotakt av tredje graden" (#7 Sweden)
- Europe – "Seven Doors Hotel" (#8 Sweden)
- Carola Häggkvist – "Främling" (#1 Denmark, Norway; #5 Sweden; #6 Finland)
- Tomas Ledin – "What Are You Doing Tonight?"(#8 Sweden)
- Jahn Teigen – "Do re mi" (#2 Norway)
- Yö – "Likaiset legendat I"

== Eurovision Song Contest ==
- Denmark in the Eurovision Song Contest 1983
- Finland in the Eurovision Song Contest 1983
- Norway in the Eurovision Song Contest 1983
- Sweden in the Eurovision Song Contest 1983

== Film and television music ==
- Anders Berglund – Två killar och en tjej, featuring Björn Haugan
- Geir Bøhren & Bent Åserud – Hockeyfeber
- Gunner Møller Pedersen – Skønheden og udyret

== Births ==
- 27 January – John Lundvik, British-born Swedish singer-songwriter
- 16 October – Loreen, Swedish double Eurovision-winning singer

== Deaths ==
- 21 May – Finn Mortensen, Norwegian music teacher, critic and composer (born 1922)
- 3 August – Helge Bonnén, Danish pianist and composer (born 1896)
- 16 October – Øivin Fjeldstad, Norwegian violinist and conductor (born 1903)
- 29 October – Sten Broman, Swedish composer (born 1902)

== See also ==
- 1983 in Denmark
- 1983 in Iceland
- 1983 in Norwegian music
- 1983 in Sweden
