= 1898 in Nordic music =

The following is a list of notable events that occurred in the year 1898 in Nordic music.

== Events ==
- 8 January – Jean Sibelius is awarded an annual stipend by the state, enabling him to become a professional composer.
- 26 June – The first Norwegian music festival is held in Bergen on the initiative of Edvard Grieg, lasting until 3 July.
- 19 September – Franz Berwald's opera Estrella de Soria, is performed at the opening of the new Royal Swedish Opera building in Stockholm.

== New works ==
- Elfrida Andrée – Fritiofs saga [Frithiof's Saga] (opera)
- Carl Nielsen – String Quartet No. 3 in E flat major
- Jean Sibelius
  - King Christian II, incidental music for play by Adolf Paul.
  - "Caprice" and "Romance (D minor)" from Ten Pieces, Op. 24
- Christian Sinding – Concerto for Violin in A major

== Popular music ==
- Olaus Alvestad – Norsk Songbok for Ungdomsskular og Ungdomslag
- Emmy Köhler – "Nu tändas tusen juleljus"

== Births ==
- 5 January – Rolf Gammleng, Norwegian violinist and administrator (died 1984)
- 20 May – Felix Krohn, Finnish conductor and composer (died 1963)
- 2 June – Ola Isene, Norwegian operatic baritone (died 1973)
- 24 July – Svea Nordblad Welander, Swedish organist, violist and composer (died 1985)
- 4 December – Reimar Riefling, Norwegian pianist and music critic (died 1981)

== Deaths ==
- 24 January – Fredrik Kjellstrand, Swedish composer (born 1826)
- 12 March – Zachris Topelius, Finnish poet, novelist and librettist (born 1818)
- 28 October – Erika Stang, Norwegian pianist and composer (born 1861)

== See also ==
- 1898 in Denmark
- 1898 in Norwegian music
- 1898 in Sweden
