= Symphonic Dances =

Symphonic Dances may refer to:

- Symphonic Dances (Rachmaninoff), an orchestral suite
- Symphonic Dances (Grieg)
- Symphonic Dances by Paul Hindemith
- Symphonic Dances by Clifton Williams
- Symphonic Dances from West Side Story (Bernstein)
