= Op. 13 =

In music, Op. 13 stands for Opus number 13. Compositions that are assigned this number include:

- Bartók – The Wooden Prince
- Beethoven – Piano Sonata No. 8
- Britten – Piano Concerto
- Dvořák – Symphony No. 4
- Enescu – Symphony No. 1
- Fauré – Violin Sonata No. 1
- Glazunov – Stenka Razin
- Kodály – Psalmus Hungaricus
- Mendelssohn – String Quartet No. 2
- Nielsen – String Quartet No. 1
- Rachmaninoff – Symphony No. 1
- Schumann – Symphonic Studies
- Sibelius – Seven Runeberg Songs, collection of art songs (1891–1892)
- Strauss – Piano Quartet
- Tchaikovsky – Symphony No. 1
