= 1953 in Nordic music =

The following is a list of notable events and compositions of the year 1953 in Nordic music.

== Events ==
- 1–15 June – The 1st Bergen International Festival is held in Bergen, Norway.
- 31 October – Nordmanns-Forbundet, a friendship association in the United States, holds a "Music of Norway" concert at Carnegie Hall, featuring music by Edvard Grieg and Sparre Olsen, with Percy Grainger as piano soloist.
- unknown dates
  - Swedish tenor Jussi Björling records roles from the operas Cavalleria Rusticana and Pagliacci, both with Stockholm Opera.
  - The Wihuri Sibelius Prize, founded by Antti Wihuri, is awarded for the first time, to Jean Sibelius, after whom it is named.

== New works ==
- Kurt Atterberg – Sinfonia per archi
- Erland von Koch
  - Musica intima
  - Musica malinconica
- Dag Wirén – String Quartet no. 4

== Popular music ==
- Åke Gerhard & Leon Landgren – "Mjölnarens Iréne"

== Film music ==
- Toivo Kärki – Rantasalmen sulttaani
- Sven Gyldmark
  - Farlig Ungdom
  - Far til Fire

== Musical films ==
- Lumikki ja 7 jätkää (Snow White and the 7 Loggers), with music by George de Godzinsky

== Births ==
- 28 February – Osmo Vänskä, Finnish clarinettist, conductor and composer
- 22 April – Juhani Komulainen, Finnish composer
- 4 May – Jakob Frímann Magnússon, Icelandic composer, filmmaker and politician
- 10 June – Svein Nymo, Norwegian violinist and composer (died 2014)
- 30 June – Ståle Wikshåland, Norwegian musicologist (died 2017)
- 14 July – Åke Parmerud, Swedish composer and artist

== Deaths ==
- 2 February – Bergliot Ibsen, Norwegian mezzo-soprano (born 1869)
- 9 December – Issay Dobrowen, Norwegian pianist, composer and conductor (born 1891)

== See also ==
- 1953 in Denmark
- 1953 in Iceland
- 1953 in Norwegian music
- 1953 in Sweden
