= 2001 in Nordic music =

The following is a list of notable events and releases that happened in Nordic music in 2001.

== Events ==
- 23 February – A television interview throws doubt on the originality of Sweden's Eurovision entry "Listen to Your Heartbeat", suggesting that it is too close to a 1996 Belgian Eurovision entry. A DJ on Radio Sweden plays the song for judges at the Melodifestivalen 2001 after-party, to which most agree that it's "just a coincidence".
- 6 April – Stein Inge Brækhus is awarded the Vossajazzprisen 2001 on the first day of Norway's 28th Vossajazz festival.
- 12 May – The 46th Eurovision Song Contest is held at Parken Stadium in Copenhagen, Denmark, and is won by Estonia, represented by Tanel Padar and Dave Benton, backed by hip hop group 2XL, with the song "Everybody". Denmark finishes in 2nd position, Sweden in 5th position, Iceland and Norway in joint 22nd position. Finland do not compete.
- 18 October – The Broadway production of Mamma Mia!, based on songs recorded by Swedish group ABBA and composed by Benny Andersson and Björn Ulvaeus, opens at the Winter Garden Theatre and runs for 5773 performances, the eighth longest run in Broadway musical history at the time.
- unknown date – Guitarist Sami Vänskä is asked to leave Finnish band Nightwish.

== Classical works ==
- Magnus Lindberg – Parada
- Frederik Magle – The Hope for brass band, choir, organ and percussion.
- Aulis Sallinen – Symphony No. 8 "Autumnal Fragments", Op. 81
- Sven-David Sandström – Jeppe: The Cruel Comedy (opera)

== Film/TV scores ==
- Lars Lillo-Stenberg – Elling

== Popular music ==
- Björk – "Hidden Place" (#1 Spain; #11 Finland; #19 Denmark, Norway)
- Christian Brøns – "Du kan gøre hvad du vil" (#1 Denmark)
- DJ Encore (featuring Engelina) – "I See Right Through to You" (#1 Denmark)
- E-Type – "Life" (#1 Sweden, #3 Norway)
- Friends – "Listen to Your Heartbeat" (#4 Sweden)
- Haldor Lægreid – "On My Own" (Norway #3)
- The Rasmus – "F-F-F-Falling" (#1 Finland)
- Roxette – "The Centre of the Heart" (#1 Sweden)

== Eurovision Song Contest ==
- Denmark in the Eurovision Song Contest 2001
- Iceland in the Eurovision Song Contest 2001
- Norway in the Eurovision Song Contest 2001
- Sweden in the Eurovision Song Contest 2001

== Births ==
- 1 December – Elias Abbas, Swedish singer
- 15 December – Diljá, Icelandic singer

== Deaths ==
- 24 January – Leif Thybo, Danish composer (born 1922)
- 24 March – Birgit Åkesson, Swedish choreographer, dancer and dance researcher (born 1908)
- 5 April – Sonya Hedenbratt, Swedish jazz singer and actress (born 1931)
- 21 April – Ulla Poulsen Skou, Danish ballerina (born 1905)
- 24 April – Gro Anita Schønn, Norwegian singer (born 1950)
- 15 June – Leif Kayser, Danish organist and composer (born 1919)
- 3 August – Lars Johan Werle, Swedish composer (born 1926)
- 26 November – Nils-Aslak Valkeapää, Finnish-Sami writer, musician, and artist (born 1943)
