= 1898 in Norwegian music =

The following is a list of notable events and releases of the year 1898 in Norwegian music.

== Events ==
June

- 26 – The first Norwegian music festival was held in Bergen on initiative by Edvard Grieg (June 26 – July 3).

Unknown date

- Olaus Alvestad publishes the songbook Norsk Songbok for Ungdomsskular og Ungdomslag.

== Births ==
January

- 5 – Rolf Gammleng, violinist and organizational leader (died 1984).

June

- 2 – Ola Isene, opera singer (baritone) and actor (died 1973).

August

- 7 – Eyvind Hesselberg, organist, composer, and conductor (died 1986).

December

- 4 – Reimar Riefling, classical pianist, music teacher, and music critic (died 1981).

== See also ==
- 1898 in Norway
- Music of Norway
