= 1926 in Nordic music =

The following is a list of notable events and compositions of the year 1926 in Nordic music.

== Events ==
- 26 June Jean Sibelius's cantata Väinämöinen's Song is premièred at a singing festival in Sortavala (then still part of Finland), with the Robert Kajanus conducting.
- 21 October – Carl Nielsen's Flute Concerto is given its world première in Paris.
- 26 December – The world première of Sibelius's tone poem Tapiola is given by Walter Damrosch and the New York Philharmonic, the last substantial composition to be made public by the composer for the remaining 30 years of his life.
- unknown date – Norwegian soprano Karen-Marie Flagstad takes her first major professional stage role as Hannah in Eduard Künneke's operetta The Cousin from Nowhere.

== New works ==
- Leevi Madetoja – Symphony No. 3
- Harald Sæverud – Symphony in B-flat minor
- Jean Sibelius – Väinämöinen's Song

== Popular music ==
- Poul Schierbeck – "I Danmark er jeg født"

== Births ==
- 9 January – Randi Hultin, Norwegian jazz critic and impresario (died 2000).
- 20 February – Hans-Jørgen Holman, Norwegian musicologist and educationalist (died 1986)
- 11 July – Nicolai Gedda, Swedish operatic tenor (died 2017)
- 13 July – Bengt-Arne Wallin, Swedish composer, arranger, trumpeter, and flugelhornist (died 2015)

== Deaths ==
- 12 January – Roger Henrichsen, Danish pianist and composer (born 1876)
- 26 May – Vendela Andersson-Sörensen, Swedish operatic soprano (born 1845)
- 18 July – Robert Emil Hansen, Danish cellist and composer (born 1860)
- 9 September – Anton Jörgen Andersen, Norwegian cellist and composer (born 1845)

== See also ==
- 1926 in Denmark
- 1926 in Iceland
- 1926 in Norwegian music
- 1926 in Sweden
