= 1895 in Nordic music =

The following is a list of notable events that occurred in the year 1895 in Nordic music.

== Events ==
- 17 April – A revised version of Sibelius's Spring Song, performed in Helsinki, receives widespread approval. Oskar Merikanto calls it "the fairest flower among Sibelius's orchestral pieces".

== New works ==
- August Enna – Kleopatra (opera), with libretto by Einar Christiansen
- Edvard Grieg
  - Lyric Pieces, Book VII
  - Haugtussa
- Jean Sibelius
  - 3 Fantasias, Op. 11
  - The Swan of Tuonela (revised version)
  - The Wood Nymph

== Popular music ==
- Fredrik Wilhelm Klint – "Aftonbön [Evening prayer]" (published)

== Births ==
- 4 March – Bjarne Brustad, Norwegian violinist and composer (died 1978)
- 24 March – Else Schøtt, Danish operatic soprano (died 1989)
- 12 July – Kirsten Flagstad, Norwegian operatic soprano (died 1982)
- 8 October – Viking Dahl, Swedish organist, teacher and composer (died 1945)

== Deaths ==
- 16 February – Fredrik August Dahlgren, Swedish songwriter (born 1816)
- 29 June – Adolf Fredrik Lindroth, Swedish violinist and composer (born 1824)

== See also ==
- 1895 in Denmark
- 1895 in Norwegian music
- 1895 in Sweden
- 1895 in Iceland
