= Violin Concerto in A minor =

Violin Concerto in A minor may refer to:

- Violin Concerto in A minor, RV 356, the sixth of "L'estro armonico" (Vivaldi)
- Violin Concerto in A minor (Bach)
- Violin Concerto No. 5 (Paganini)
- Violin Concerto in A minor (Schumann), arranged from Cello Concerto in A minor
- Violin Concerto No. 5 (Vieuxtemps)
- Violin Concerto No. 1 (Goldmark)
- Violin Concerto (Dvořák)
- Violin Concerto (Glazunov)
- Violin Concerto No. 1 (Shostakovich)
- Violin Concerto (Riisager)
