= 1935 in Nordic music =

The following is a list of notable events and compositions of the year 1935 in Nordic music.

== Events ==
- 23 November – Helvi Leiviskä makes her debut as a composer, premiering her own piano concerto.
- 8 December – Jean Sibelius celebrates his 70th birthday. Adolf Hitler awards him the Goethe-Medal.
- 14 December – Sven Blohm's melodrama Öde jul is premièred by the Stockholm Concert Society, conducted by Adolf Wiklund.
- unknown date – Wilhelm Peterson-Berger founds the Frösö outdoor festival at Frösön, his summer home.

== New works ==
- Leevi Madetoja – Juha (opera)
- Väinö Raitio
  - Forest Idylls
  - Legend
- Maidens on the Headlands

== Popular music ==
- Alice Tegnér – "Melodi"
- "När ljusen tändas därhemma" – translated into Swedish by Nils Hellström

== Film music ==
- Kai Normann Andersen – Äventyr i pyjamas
- Eric Bengtson & Yngve Sköld – Bränningar
- Jules Sylvain – Munkbrogreven

== Births ==
- 19 May – Aulis Sallinen, Finnish composer
- 9 April – Tore Jensen, Norwegian jazz trumpeter
- 23 September – Liv Glaser, Norwegian pianist and music teacher
- 12 December – Juhani Aaltonen, Finnish jazz saxophonist and flautist

== Deaths ==
- 9 January – Dina Edling, opera singer (born 1854)
- 12 January – Albert Lindström, Swedish organist, arranger and composer (born 1853)
- 18 January – Svante Sjöberg, Swedish organist, arranger and composer (born 1873)
- 11 May – Nanna Liebmann, Danish composer and music critic (born 1849)
- 10 November – Adrian Dahl, Swedish pianist, composer and music critic (born 1864)
- 4 December – Johan Halvorsen, Norwegian violinist, conductor and composer (born 1864)
- 9 December – Nina Grieg, soprano and wife of Edvard Grieg (born 1845)

== See also ==
- 1935 in Denmark
- 1935 in Iceland
- 1935 in Norwegian music
- 1935 in Sweden
