= String Quartet No. 3 (Nielsen) =

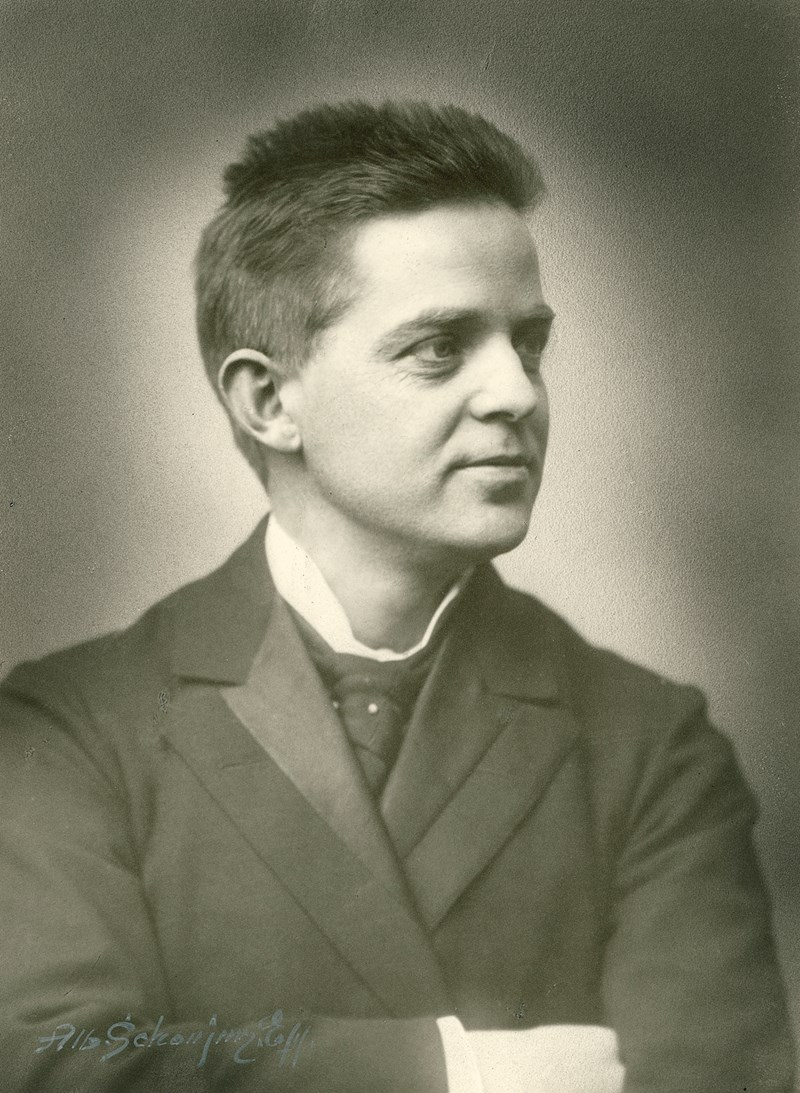
Carl Nielsen in 1901

Carl Nielsen's String Quartet No. 3 in E♭ major, Op. 14, was composed in 1897 and 1898. The third of Nielsen's four string quartets in the official series, it was first performed privately in Vor Forening (Our Society) on 1 May 1899 with Anton Svendsen, Ludvig Holm, Frederik Marke and Ejler Jensen as performers.

== Background ==
In 1897 and 1898, Nielsen was a busy man: not only was he preparing to write an opera (Saul og David) but he spent the summers looking after his parents-in-law's farm near Kolding in Jutland. Nielsen had an unfortunate experience when he tried to deliver the quartet's third and fourth movements for fair copying. When he arrived at the copyist's, a horse was lying in distress in front of a cart. He gave his music roll to a boy to hold and helped the horse up, but in just a couple of minutes the boy had disappeared with the roll and Nielsen had to write it all out once more.

== Reception ==
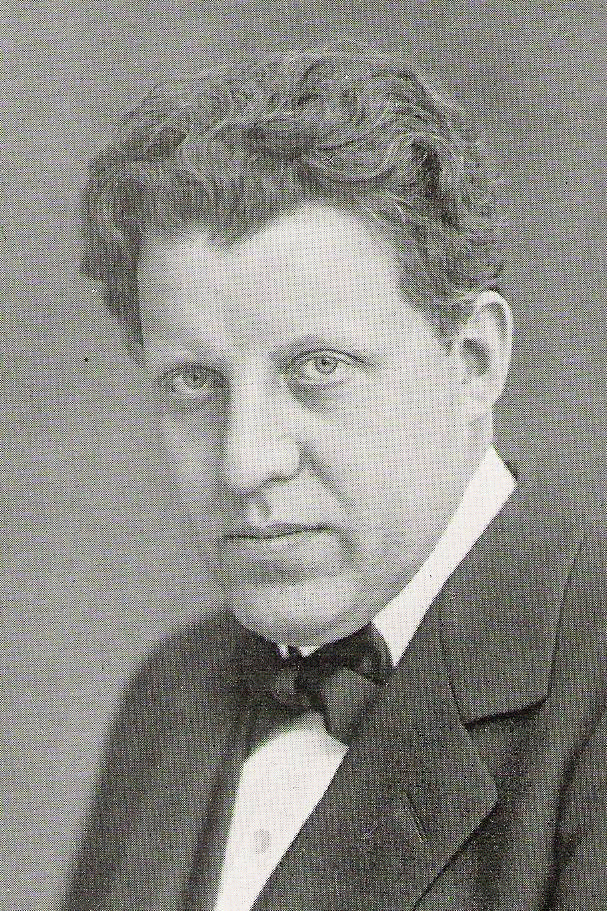
Georg Høeberg, leader of the Høeberg Quartet

There appear to have been more than one private performances of the work but the third quartet was first performed in public at a concert on 4 October 1901 in the small hall of the Odd Fellows Mansion in Copenhagen. It was the first chamber music concert by the newly formed Høeberg Quartet, consisting of Georg Høeberg, Louis Witzansky, Anton Bloch and Ernst Høeberg.

While the reviewers praised the musicians, they were not all complimentary about the music. In Nationaltidende, Gustav Hetsch commented that the first movement "appears to belong to the kind of music that is splendid to read on the lined music paper, but in the event it sounds frightful. The few moments where we grasped the musical point were drowned out by the other cacophonous babble." But he liked the Andante "which is quite elevated in its mood... There is a wide horizon, a wealth of stars in the firmament and lofty cypresses in this music, which is so modern that it reaches back for the broad lines and simple colours of the past." The other reviews were equally critical of the first movement.

== Other performances ==
The work was played many times in Carl Nielsen’s lifetime by several quartets including the Høeberg Quartet and the Breuning-Bache Quartet. Peder Møller and Emil Telmányi were among the first violinists. In 1925 it was performed at the first of three concerts in the ceremonial hall of the University on the occasion of the composer’s sixtieth birthday. The review in Politiken spoke of "the E flat major quartet and its indisputable mastery, his greatest triumph in this music genre, powerful and manly, profoundly poetic, gracefully pastoral, courageously ambitious." There were also positive reviews of performances in Germany in 1902.

== Music ==
- The first movement, Allegro con brio, with its contrapuntal effects is boldly assertive.
- The second movement, introduced by a brief Andante sostenuto leads into the main theme played by the first violin which soon develops into dramatic harmonic complexity.
- The Allegretto pastorale in the third movement is led by the first violin with the imaginative accompaniment of the other instruments. There is a startling Presto before the first violin races through a series of triplets interrupted by double stop chords. We then experience a lyrical interlude before returning to the main section.
- The finale begins with a rousing Allegro coraggioso before the main theme gives way to a second subject with a series of fugues and an attractive pizzicato intermezzo.
