= 1978 in Norwegian music =

The following is a list of notable events and releases of the year 1978 in Norwegian music.

== Events ==
=== March ===
- 17 – The 5th Vossajazz started in Vossavangen, Norway (17–19 March).

=== May ===
- 24
  - The 26th Bergen International Festival started in Bergen, Norway (24 May – 7 June).
  - The 6th Nattjazz started in Bergen, Norway (24 May – 7 June).

=== August ===
- 27 – The 10th Kalvøyafestivalen started at Kalvøya near by Oslo.

== Albums released ==
=== Unknown date ===
A

Arild Andersen

- Green Shading into Blue (ECM Records)

G

Jan Garbarek

- My Song (ECM Records), with Keith Jarrett, Palle Danielsson, and Jon Christensen
- Places (ECM Records)

N

Teddy Nelson

- Point Of Departure (Sonet Records), with Flying Norwegians

P

Popol Ace

- Curly Sounds (Polydor Records)

R

Terje Rypdal

- Waves (ECM Records)

T

Jahn Teigen

- This Year's Loser (Polydor Records)

== Deaths ==
February

- 13 – Aslak Brekke, traditional folk singer (born 1901).

May

- 20 – Bjarne Brustad, composer, violinist and violist (born 1895).

== Births ==
January

- 30 – Jan Thore Grefstad, rock singer and songwriter.

February

- 23 – Ingrid Andsnes, classical pianist.

April

- 21 – Amund Svensson, black metal guitarist, keyboardist and composer.
- 23 – Lorentz Aspen, heavy metal pianist and keyboardist.

May

- 5 – Ola Gjeilo, classical composer and pianist.
- 7 – Stian Hinderson, black metal guitarist, bassist, drummer, keyboardist and vocalist.

June

- 17 – Esben Selvig, rapper and singer.
- 24 – Nikolai Eilertsen, rock bass guitarist.

July

- 26 – Silvia Moi, operatic singer.

August

- 17 – Vibeke Stene, operatic soprano.
- 31 – Morten Qvenild, jazz pianist, band leader, and music producer.

September

- 3 – Terje Bakken, black metal lead singer known as "Valfar", Windir, (died 2004).
- 6 – Karin Park, singer, songwriter, and model.
- 16
  - Ane Carmen Roggen, soprano singer, conductor, music arranger, and journalist.
  - Ida Roggen, jazz singer, information officer and literary scholar.
- 26 – Ingfrid Breie Nyhus, classical pianist.
- 29 – Kurt Nilsen, pop singer.

October

- 5 – Steinar Nickelsen, jazz organist and pianist.
- 12 – Børge-Are Halvorsen, jazz saxophonist.
- 20 – Venke Knutson, pop singer.
- 26 – Tarjei Strøm, rock drummer and program host.
- 30 – Tore Bruvoll, traditional folk guitarist, multi-instrumentalist, composer, and music arranger.

November

- 3 – Jonas Howden Sjøvaag, jazz drummer, Eple Trio.
- 5 – Marita Røstad, singer-songwriter and jazz vocalist.
- 9 – Even Ormestad, jazz bass guitarist and music producer, Jaga Jazzist.

December

- 12 – Lage Lund, jazz guitarist.
- 30
  - Daniel Heløy Davidsen, jazz guitarist.
  - Julie Dahle Aagård, jazz vocalist, composer, and band leader.

Unknown date

- Trond Frønes, prog rock bass guitarist.
- Sven Garas, pop artist, songwriter, and music producer.

== See also ==
- 1978 in Norway
- Music of Norway
- Norway in the Eurovision Song Contest 1978
