= 1895 in Norwegian music =

The following is a list of notable events and releases of the year 1896 in Norwegian music.

== Births ==
March

- 4 – Bjarne Brustad, composer, violinist and violist (died 1978).

June

- 2 – Arild Sandvold, organist, composer, and choir conductor (born 1984).

July

- 12 – Kirsten Flagstad, operatic soprano (died 1962).

October

- 2 – Soffi Schønning, operatic soprano (died 1994).

== See also ==
- 1895 in Norway
- Music of Norway
