= Knudåge Riisager =

Danish composer

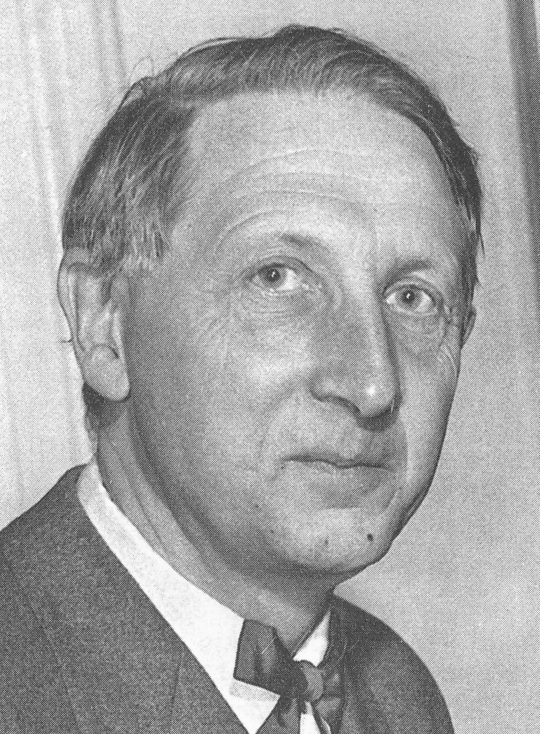
- Born: 6 March 1897; Kunda, Governorate of Estonia, Russian Empire
- Died: 26 December 1974 (aged 77); Copenhagen, Denmark
- Occupation: Composer

Knudåge Riisager (6 March 1897 – 26 December 1974) was a Danish composer. His work was part of the music event in the art competition at the 1928 Summer Olympics.

== Early life and education ==
Knudåge Riisager was born in Kunda, in the Russian Empire, in what is today Estonia of Danish parents. His father Emil Riisager was an engineer, and the family returned to Denmark in 1900 when Knudåge was three years old.

He graduated from Copenhagen University where he received violin lessons from Peder Møller, and studied music theory under Otto Malling and Peder Gram. For many years he worked in a government job, and also as a composer. In 1923, he went to Paris to study with Albert Roussel and Paul Le Flem, where he experienced at first hand French neoclassicism and the music of Igor Stravinsky and Les Six. Later he also studied in Leipzig with Hermann Grabner.

== Career ==
Knudåge Riisager's international fame is largely due to his extensive work in ballet music, which was primarily a result of collaboration with Harald Lander. The first work he composed for the Royal Danish Theatre was music for the ballet Benzin by Storm P. staged by Elna Ørnberg in 1930.

Knudåge Riisager was also an industrious writer: his bibliography includes nearly 400 titles spread over six decades. In 1956–67, he was director of the Royal Danish Academy of Music. His compositions are stored in the Music and Theatre Department at the Royal Danish Library.

He was a commander of the 1st degree in the Dannebrogordenen, died in Copenhagen, and is buried at Tibirkegård.

== Music ==
According to his entry in Grove, "Riisager became the most prominent representative of the French-orientated trend in Danish music of the interwar years". His trumpet concertino (1933) is considered a leading example of Danish neoclassical music.

== Notable works ==
Opera

- Susanne, Op. 49 (1948)

Ballet music

- Benzin, Op. 17 (1930)
- Cocktails-Party, Op. 19 (1930) (ikke opført)
- Darduse, Op. 32 (1935–36)
- Tolv med Posten, Op. 37 (1942)
- Slaraffenland, Op. 33 (1936–40)
- Qarrtsiluni, Op. 36 (1938–42)
- Fugl Fønix (1944/45)
- Études (1947, after Carl Czerny)
- Månerenen, Op. 57 (1956)
- Fruen fra havet, Op. 59 (1959)
- Galla-Variationer (1966)
- Ballet Royal (1967)
- Svinedrengen (1968)

Film music

- Niels Ebbesen (1945)

Revymusik

- Paa Hodet, første PH-revy, musik til finalen (1929)

Orchestral music

- Erasmus Montanus, Op. 1 (1920)
- Suite dionysiaque, Op. 6
- Symphony No. 1, Op. 8 (1925)
- Variationer over et tema af Mezangeau, Op. 12 (1926)
- Symphony No. 2, Op. 14 (1927)
- Fastelavn, Op. 20 (1929/30)
- Concerto for orchestra, Op. 24 (1931)
- Concertino for trumpet and strings, Op. 29 (1933)
- Symphony No. 3, Op. 30 (1935)
- Symphony No. 4, Op. 38 (Sinfonia gaia) (1939–40)
- Symphony No. 5, Op. 52 (Sinfonia serena) (1949–50)
- Violin Concerto in A minor, Op. 54 (1950-1951}
- Little Overture for Strings

Chamber music

- Violin Sonata No. 1
- Violin Sonata No. 2 (1923)

== See also ==
- List of Danish composers
