= 1903 in Nordic music =

== Events ==
- 2 May – Composer Edvard Grieg, in Paris, becomes the first Norwegian to make a gramophone record.
- 25 November – Swedish soprano Olive Fremstad (Anna Olivia Rundquist) makes her debut at the Metropolitan Opera, New York, United States, as Sieglinde in Die Walküre.

== New works ==
- Hugo Alfvén – Swedish Rhapsody No. 1 (Midsommarvaka)
- Carl Nielsen – Helios Overture
- Sigurd Lie – Symfoni i a-moll
- Jean Sibelius – Kuolema

== Births ==
- 18 April – Lulu Ziegler, Danish actress and singer (died 1973)
- 25 April – Carl Gustav Sparre Olsen, Norwegian violinist and composer (died 1984)
- 28 April – Egil Rasmussen, Norwegian author, literature critic and pianist (died 1964).
- 2 May – Øivin Fjeldstad, Norwegian orchestra conductor, violinist, and conducted the Oslo Philharmonic (died 1983).
- 5 August – Otto Lington, Danish violinist, jazz bandleader and composer (died 1903)
- 17 August – Bjarne Amdahl, Norwegian pianist, composer and orchestra conductor (died 1968).
- 29 September – Karl Andersen, solo cellist for the Oslo Philharmonic (died 1970)
- 13 October – Jens Bjerre Jacobsen, Danish organist and composer (died 1986)
- 30 October – Leif Rustad, Norwegian cellist and radio pioneer (died 1976)

== Deaths ==
- 24 July – Adolf Thomsen (50), organist and composer
- 27 July – Lina Sandell (71), Swedish hymn writer (born 1832)
- 27 October – Erika Nissen (58), pianist

== See also ==
- 1903 in Norway
- 1903 in Sweden
