= Helge Bonnén =

Danish musician

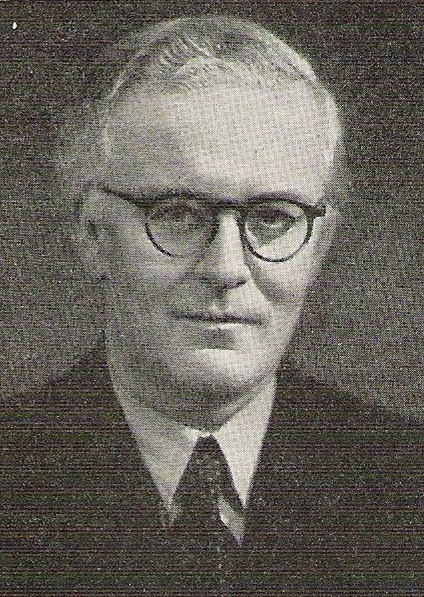
Helge Bonnén

Helge Bonnén (22 March 1896 – 3 August 1983) was a Danish composer and pianist. He is best remembered for his politics of music.

He made his debut as a pianist during World War I after having been a student of Agnes Adler and Anders Rachlew. Bonnen was responsible for starting the Young Musician Society (UTS), it is now known as Young Tone Artists (DUT). He was a founding member of the Danish Music Magazine (DMT) and President of the UTS for 2 periods and editor of the DMT in the 1920s.

In 1932, he founded and led his Opera Company of 1932. In addition, he wrote a book about Peter Erasmus Lange-Müller.
