= 1922 in Nordic music =

The following is a list of notable events and compositions of the year 1922 in Nordic music.

== Events ==
- 24 January – Danish composer Carl Nielsen conducts the first public performance of his Symphony No. 5, in Copenhagen.
- 8 July – At Denmark's Third National Choral Festival, Nielsen's Fynsk Foraar (Springtime on Funen), with lyrics by the poet Aage Berntsen, is premièred at Odense's Kvæghal, conducted by Georg Høeberg.

== New works ==
- Kurt Atterberg – Cello Concerto (final version)
- Carl Nielsen – Wind Quintet
- Jean Sibelius – Andante festivo

== Popular music ==
- Adolf Wiklund – "En Solvisa"

== Births ==
- 6 January – Finn Mortensen, Norwegian composer, music critic, and music teacher (died 1983).
- 18 May – Kai Winding, Danish-born jazz musician (died 1983)
- 1 June – Baron Povel Ramel, Swedish musician and entertainer (died 2007)
- 10 June – Edvard Hagerup Bull, Norwegian composer (died 2012)
- 12 June – Leif Thybo, Danish organist and composer (died 2001)
- 30 June – Hanna-Marie Weydahl, Norwegian pianist (died 2016)
- 29 August – Rolf Ericson, Swedish jazztrumpeter and flugelhornist (died 1997)
- 4 October – Stan Hasselgård, Swedish jazz clarinetist (died 1948)
- 27 October – Poul Bundgaard, Danish actor and singer (died 1998)
- 6 November – Lars Edlund, Swedish organist, composer and music teacher (died 2013)

== Deaths ==
- 22 February – Thorvald Lammers, Norwegian baritone, choral conductor and composer (born 1841)
- 15 March – Ika Peyron, Swedish pianist, organist and composer (born 1845)
- 2 July – Christian Sibelius, Finnish psychiatrist and amateur cellist, brother of the composer Sibelius (born 1869; pernicious anaemia)
- 26 October – Theodora Cormontan, Norwegian pianist, music publisher, and composer (born 1840)
- 1 November – Wilhelm Theodor Söderberg, Swedish composer and music teacher (born 1845)

== See also ==
- 1922 in Denmark
- 1922 in Iceland
- 1922 in Norwegian music
- 1922 in Sweden
