= Balduin Dahl =

Danish composer and conductor

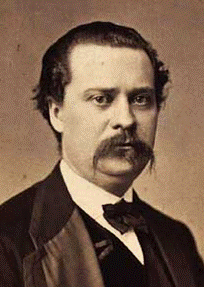
Balduin Dahl.

Christian Florus Balduin Dahl (6 October 1834 – 3 June 1891) was a Danish composer and conductor. He spent a portion of his career with Den Kongelige Livgarde. He was the son of a musician at Tivoli Gardens. After the death of Hans Christian Lumbye, Dahl took over as the conductor of the daily concerts given at Tivoli Gardens. Dahl was considered one of the "great features" of Tivoli when he led the orchestra; his baton was presented to the orchestra by Danish-American musical director Victor Bancke on a visit to Copenhagen.
