= Anker Hansen =

Norwegian footballer (1902-1981)

Personal information
- Date of birth: 27 February 1902
- Date of death: 22 May 1981 (aged 79)

International career
Years	Team	Apps	(Gls)
1925	Norway	1	(0)

Anker Hansen (27 February 1902 – 22 May 1981) was a Norwegian footballer. He played in one match for the Norway national football team in 1925.
