= Svea Nordblad Welander =

Swedish Composer (1898 – 1985)

Svea Goeta Nordblad Welander (24 July 1898 – 1985) was a Swedish composer, organist, teacher, and violist, who was born in Limhamn, Malmo, to a family of nine children. In 1914, she began working as cinema pianist to save money for further education. She studied in Malmo and later in Copenhagen. Her teachers included John Heinze, Henrik Knudsen, Lars-Erik Larsson, and Sten Broman. She became a member of the Society of Swedish Composers.

From 1927 to 1964, Svea was a church organist in Bjurlov. She taught music at Hyilan Folk High School for 18 years, and taught piano at the Music Conservatory in Malmo from 1927 to 1935, leaving when she married composer Waldemar Welander. They had a daughter named Monica. Svea published music under her birth name "Nordblad" and also under her married name "Welander." Svea and Waldemar helped found Akarp's orchestra, where she played viola for many years.

Her compositions include:

== Chamber ==
- Burlesque Melody (flute, clarinet and bassoon)
- Choral Preludes (organ)
- Dialogue and Fugue (two woodwinds)
- Divertimento (clarinet, violin and cello)
- Humoresque (violin and piano; 1942)
- Mazurka No. 2 (violin, cello and piano)
- Monica's Mazurka (violin, cello and piano)
- Preludium (clarinet; 1962)
- Preludium (flute, clarinet and bassoon; 1966)
- Preludium (clarinet or saxophone trio)
- Preludium on a Synagogue Theme (three wind instruments; 1955)
- Sonatina (clarinet and bassoon; 1966)
- Sonatina (piano)
- Sonatina (viola and piano; 1945)
- Sonatina in Old Style (clarinet, violin and cello)
- String Quartet No. 1
- Trio (violin, cello and piano)
- Waltz Serenade (piano)

== Orchestra ==
- Scherzando (string orchestra)
- Serenade (string orchestra)
- Small Suite (string orchestra)
- Waltz Serenade

== Vocal ==
- Abide with Me (text by Henry Francis Lyte; 1949)
- Arioso (text by Eric Rembert; soprano and string orchestra; 1956)
- "Bathing" (voice and piano)
- Berceuse (text by Lope de Vega; women's chorus and piano; 1956)
- Cantata (solo voice and chorus)
- Cantata for the Installation of the Dean (soprano, tenor, chorus and strings)
- "Evening: (voice and piano; 1935)
- "For a Wonderful Star" (voice and piano; 1956)
- Hymn (solo voice, women's chorus and organ; 1943)
- "I Asked a Star" (voice and piano; 1948)
- "Impromptu" (text by Gabriel Jonsson; voice and piano)
- "In Bethlehem's Stable" (voice and piano)
- "Like Me So Much" (text by Axel Ahlman; voice and piano; 1948)
- Little Cantata (text by H. Schiller; solo voice, women's chorus and organ; 1943)
- "Poor Son" (voice and piano)
- Rain (text by Sten Gelander; soprano and strings; 1945)
- Requiem: The Last Journey (text by Axel Ahlman; solo voice, chorus and orchestra)
- "Tree of Life" (voice and piano; 1948)
- Two Indian Hymns (mixed chorus; 1953)
- "Under the Lilacs" (voice and piano)
- "Wedding Song" (text by Eric Rembert; voice and organ; 1947)
- "With Many Colored Lights" (text by Nils Ferlin; voice and piano)
