= Violin Concerto (Nielsen) =

Concerto for violin and orchestra by Carl Nielsen

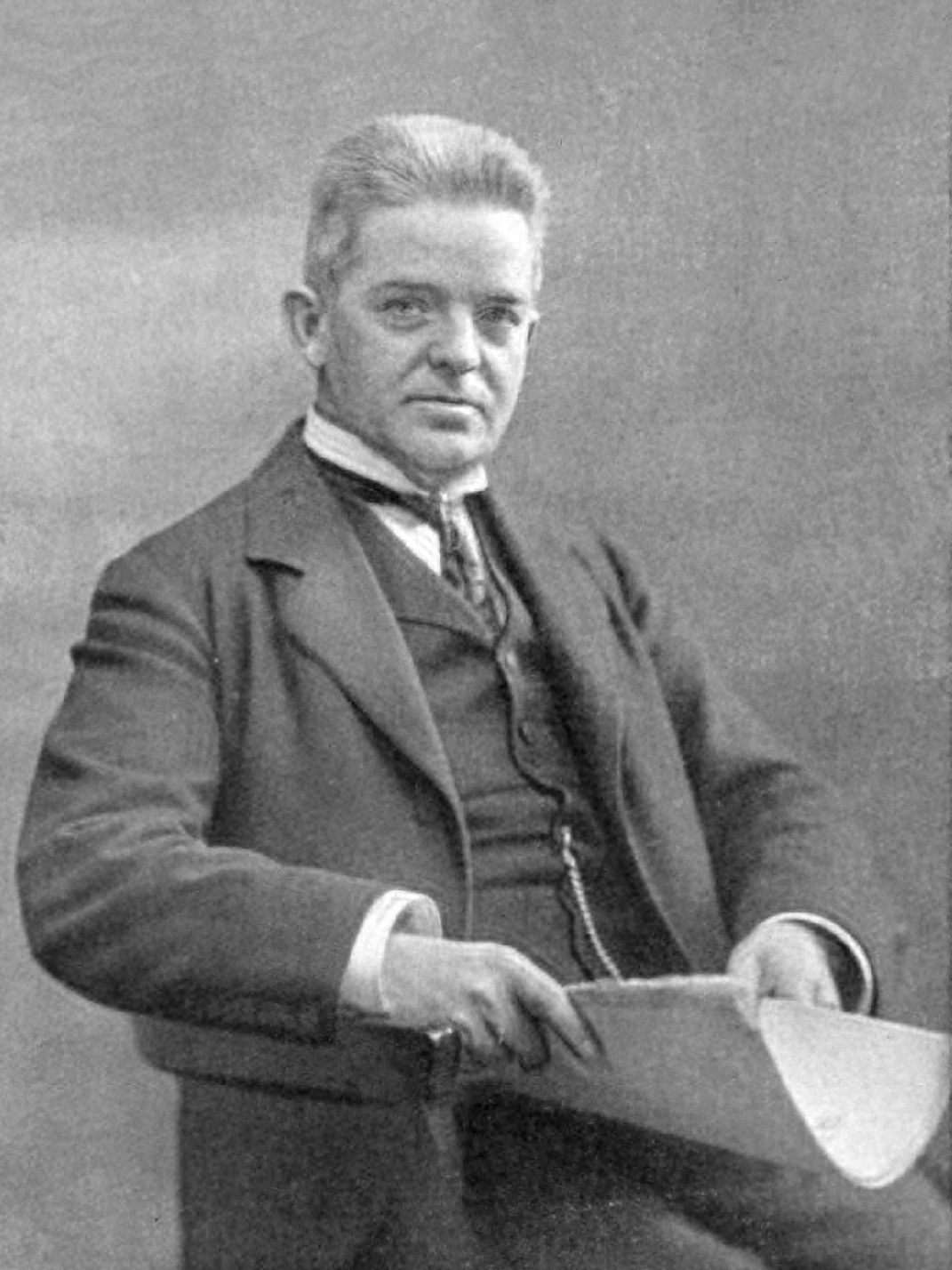
Carl Nielsen in 1917

Carl Nielsen's Concerto for Violin and orchestra, op. 33 [D.F.61] was written for Peder Møller (1877–1940) in 1911. It has three movements, opening with a virtuosic prelude.

== Background ==
The Concerto for Violin and Orchestra, Opus 33, was not an easy assignment for Nielsen. He began writing it in the summer of 1911 in Bergen, Norway, where he was spending some time at the invitation of Nina Grieg. It progressed with some difficulty as Nielsen, now back in his native Denmark, commented that the concerto "has to be good music, and yet always make allowances for the activity of the solo instrument in the best light, that is rich in content, popular and dazzling without becoming superficial." He did not complete it until mid-December.

== Reception ==
The first performance followed on 28 February 1912, the same night as the first performance of Nielsen's 3rd Symphony. Carl Nielsen himself conducted the Royal Danish Orchestra at the Odd Fellows Mansion in Copenhagen with Peder Møller, Nielsen's preferred virtuoso, as soloist. Nielsen spoke of the "great enthusiasm" with which the concerto was received but the press commented above all on the masterly performance of Møller. Robert Henriques, in his extremely positive review, noted: “The Violin Concerto is a very significant work which will gain every time it is heard, because of course one only gradually becomes aware of all the brilliant details." He viewed the concert, which included Nielsen's third symphony, as a demonstration of the composer's "rare talent", commenting that he was "on the true road towards the great goals he has set himself". It became something of a landmark for Nielsen who wrote of his overwhelming "Erfolg" (success). The concerto continued to be received with enthusiasm as it was performed on several occasions over the following years, not only in Denmark but also in Gothenburg and Stockholm, always with Møller as soloist.

== Music ==
1. Prelude. Largo – Allegro cavalleresco
2. Poco adagio
3. Rondo. Allegretto scherzando

Unlike Nielsen's later works, the concerto has a distinct, melody-oriented Neo-Classical structure. Unusual for a concerto, the first movement is prefaced by a virtuosic "Praeludium". The "Praeludium" is followed by a catchy tune for the orchestra which provides opportunities for tricks by the violin. The long, slow Adagio leads directly to the final Scherzo which, as Nielsen commented, "renounces everything that might dazzle or impress".

== Instrumentation ==
- 2 flutes, 2 Oboes, 2 Clarinets, 2 Bassoons, 4 Horns, 2 trumpets, 3 trombones, Timpani, Strings.

== Selected recordings ==
- James Ehnes: with the Bergen Philharmonic Orchestra, conducted by Edward Gardner
