= Violin Concerto (Glass) =

1960 violin work by Philip Glass

The Concerto for Violin and Orchestra is a work by Philip Glass, written for and performed by Dorothy Pixley-Rothschild in the summer of 1960 at the Aspen Music Festival and School under the guidance of Darius Milhaud.

The visiting composer Aaron Copland criticized Glass's orchestration of the concerto, as Glass remembered in 1989: "We got into a big argument. He didn't like me very much. I kind of told him that I thought he was wrong. By the way, the concerto was played at the end of the summer, and it turned out I was right."

Dissatisfied with his works composed before 1966, Glass withdrew this piece.
