= Robert Emil Hansen =

Danish composer and cellist

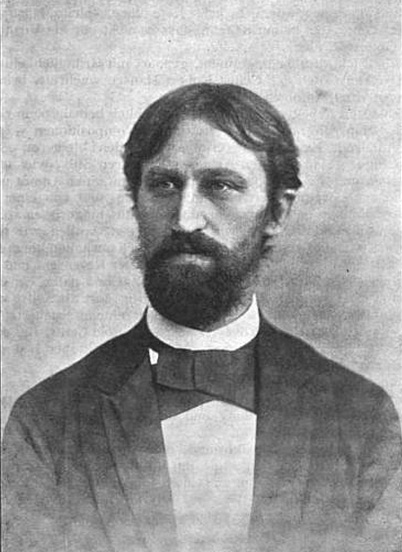
Robert Emil Hansen

Robert Emil Hansen (25 February 1860 – 1926) was a Danish composer and cellist. He was the brother of Agnes Adler.

== Selected works ==
- Symphony No. 1 in D minor (before 1880)
- Cello concerto (1881)
- Piano Trio (1882)
- Phædra (concert overture, 1884)
- Piano concerto (1885)
- Violin sonata (1885)
- Piano quintet (1886)
- Suite for Orchestra (1887)
- String Quartet (1891)
- Symphony No. 2 (1892)
- Trio in D minor (flute, violin and cello - 1910)

== See also ==
- List of Danish composers
- Article In Danish in the Danish Lexicon
