= Elna Ørnberg =

Danish ballet dancer

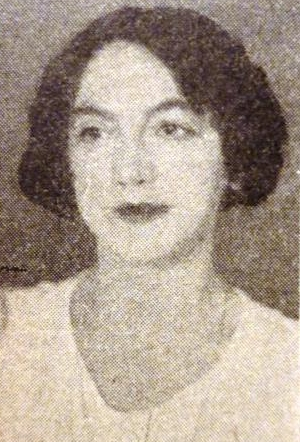
Elna Ørnberg (c. 1935)

Elna Eleonora Fobian Ørnberg, also Elna Jørgen-Jensen, (20 March 1890 – 18 March 1969) was a Danish ballet dancer and instructor who as a soloist starred in Bournonville's productions at the Royal Danish Theatre from 1907. After receiving further training with Mikhail Fokin, she choreographed the once popular but now forgotten Strauss i Paris in 1932. In 1933, she retired as a dancer but continued as a trainer. As a result of her support of the Nazis under the German occupation in World War II, she was imprisoned for six months. In the late 1940s, she left Denmark together with her husband Leif and settled and taught in Madrid.

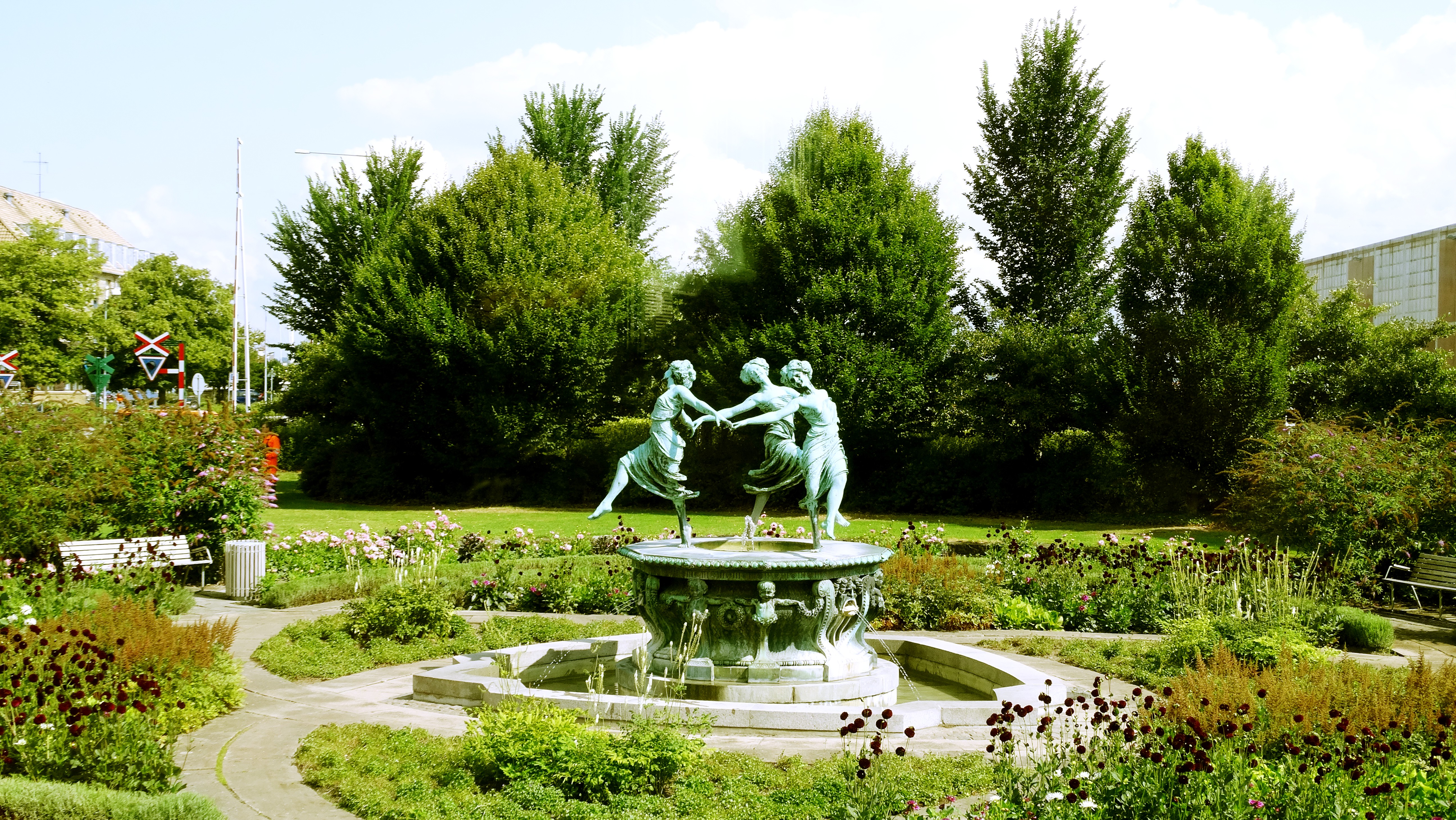
Together with Emilie Schmidt and Grethe Sønck, Elna Ørnberg modelled for the Ballerina Fountain (Danserindebrønden) in Helsingør

== Biography ==
Born in Copenhagen on 20 March 1890, Elna Eleonora Fobian was the daughter of Alexander Theobald Larsen and Joachimine Beate Emilie Fobian (1866–1935). She was adopted by her mother's second husband, the parliamentary official Axel Lauesgaard (1870–1944).

From the age of seven, she attended the Royal Danish Theatre's ballet school where she became prominent at an early age when performing Amor in Vincenzo Galeotti's ballet Amors og Balletmesterens Luner (The Whims of Cupid and the Ballet Master). As she advanced, she was introduced to the Bournonville style by Hans Beck and Valborg Borchsenius.

She debuted in 1907 as the Good Fairy in Emilie Walbom's Harlekins Millioner. She achieved further recognition the following year when she performed Pierrette in the same ballet. After becoming a soloist in 1910, she soon established herself as the company's most competent female dancer, performing the leading roles in Bounonville's Sylfiden, Brudefærden i Hardanger, Et Folkesagn, Fjernt fra Danmark and Toreadoren. Thanks to her outstanding technique and imposing personality, she excelled as Swanhilda in Coppélia when performing in Paris, London and Berlin. She is also remembered for performing the title role in Sylvia and for playing erotic roles in The Veil of Pierrette (1911) and Scaramouche (1922).

After training with Mikhail Fokin when he visited Copenhagen, she became particularly interested in modern ballet, playing Tabor in Walbom's En Nat i Ægypten in 1918 and Hakon Børresen's Tycho Brahes Drøm (1924). She also collaborated with George Balanchine when he introduced new works to Denmark in 1930–31. After retiring in 1933, she and her husband opened a ballet school in Copenhagen in 1936.

During the Second World War, influenced by her husband Leif, she collaborated with the Germans, participating in propaganda-based radio plays and sketches. As a result, in 1946 both she and her husband received prison sentences. In the late 1940s, the couple settled in Madrid where they opened a ballet school. Elna Ørnberg also worked as a ballet instructor. She died in Madrid on 18 March 1969.

== Family ==
On 3 July 1910, Elna Fobian married director Erik Jørgen-Jensen (1885–1958). The couple had a son (Thorkild) in 1911. They divorced in 1929. On 30 May 1932, she married Johannes Leif Ørnberg (1904–1977), a solo dancer at the Royal Danish Theatre.

== Awards ==
In 1922, she was awarded the Ingenio et arti medal but it was confiscated in the mid-1940s for her collaboration with the Nazis.
