= Wilhelm Herman Barth =

Danish musician, composer, and music theorist (1813–1896)

Wilhelm Herman Barth (27 April 1813 – 1 August 1896) was a Danish musician, composer and music theorist.

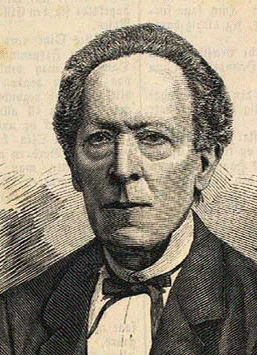
Barth HW

Barth was born in Copenhagen, the son of carpenter Friderich Wilhelm Barth (born in Berlin in 1787) and Eleonora Elisabeth, née Schultz. In 1834 he married Caroline Amalie Marquard, daughter of his manager Johan Hendrik Marquard.

Barth played violin, horn, cello and organ. He was appointed to the Royal Life Guards from 1834 to 1838. In 1852, Barth was the organist at the Reformerte Church, in 1859 at the St. Peter's Church, Copenhagen, and in 1878 at the Jacob Church.

Barth was a notable music theorist and was one of the first independent writers in this field in his region. His works were heavily used in the teaching of music theory.
