= Vendela Andersson-Sörensen =

Swedish operatic soprano (1860–1926)

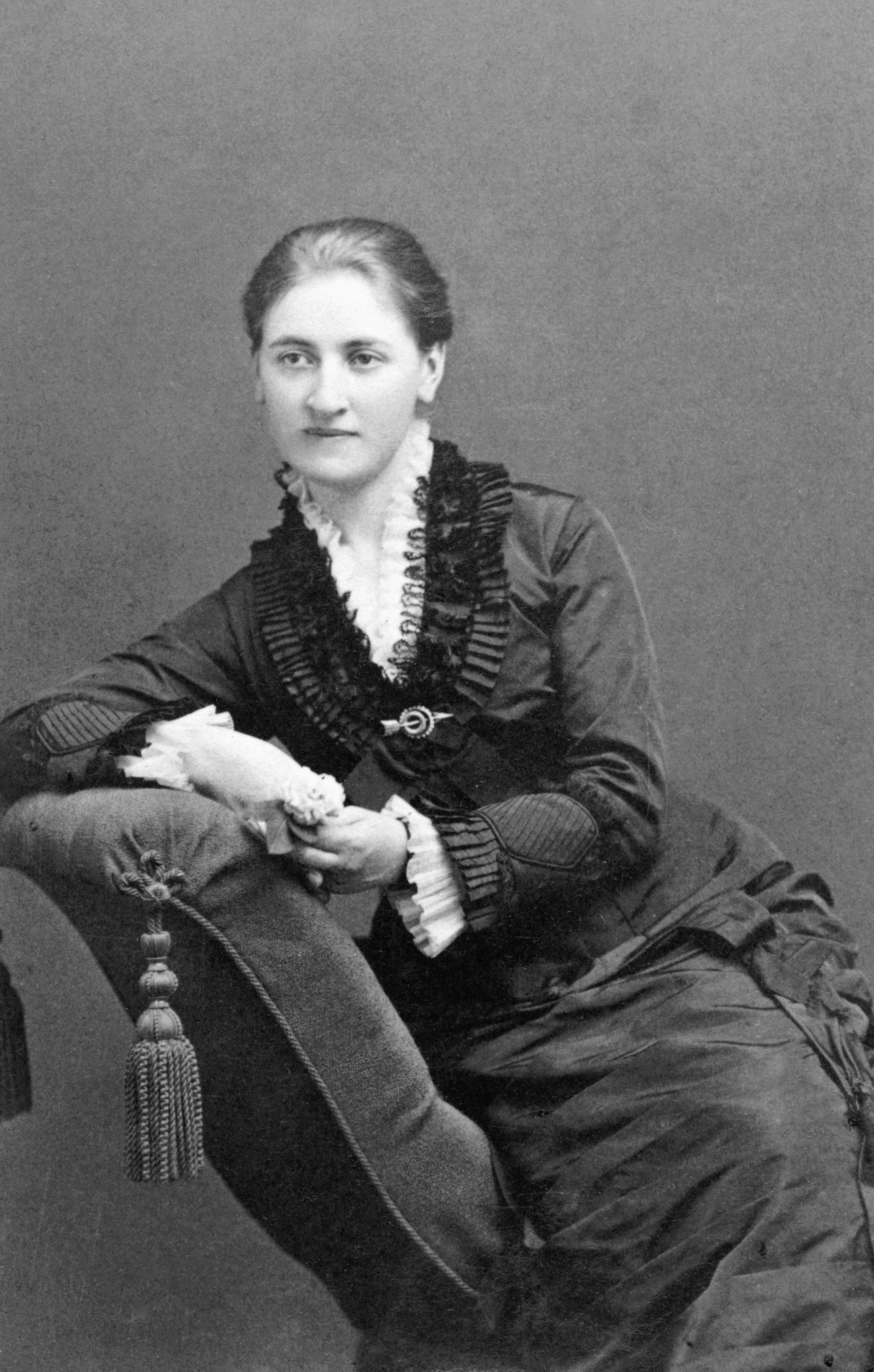
- Andersson-Sörensen in 1880

Background information
- Born: Vendela Linnea Andersson; 19 November 1860; Halmstad, Sweden
- Died: 26 May 1926 (aged 65) Falkenberg, Sweden
- Occupation: Operatic soprano
- Instrument: Voice
- Spouse(s): Sofus Sörensen (m. 1888; died 1899) Fredrik Sörensen (m. 1901; died 1914)
- Awards: Litteris et Artibus, 1893

Vendela Linnea Andersson-Sörensen (née Andersson; 19 November 1860–26 May 1926) was a Swedish Operatic soprano. After training under the opera singer Isidor Dannström, in 1880 she made her début at Stockholm's Nya teatern as Adele in Daniel Auber's Svarte dominon. She performed leading soprano roles at the Royal Swedish Opera where she was engaged from 1882 to 1887. After her marriage in early 1888, she gave concerts and appeared in opera as a guest performer.

== Early life ==
Vendela Linnea Andersson was born on 19 November 1860 in Halmstad, Sweden to August Andersson, a musician, and Gustava Vilhelmina Andersson (née Berggren). She experienced a rather difficult childhood as her father tried to make a living by performing at various events. When he died of pneumonia in 1866, her mother had to support three children. She entrusted Vendela to a friend in Helsingborg where she started taking singing lessons and gave singing performances. On the advice of the singing teacher Isidor Dannström, she stopped performing and thanks to support from those who had heard her sing, she attended Nisbethska girls' school in Kalmar where she was able to study music. After seven years at the school, she went to Stockholm where she studied voice under Dannström and acting under Signe Hebbe.

== Career ==
On 17 December 1878, she made her début at Gothenborg's Nya teatern as Serpolette in Dannström's Crispinos giftermål, receiving good reviews. The following year, she performed in Stockholm's Nya teatern as Adele in Daniel Auber's Svarte dominon and in the title role of Madame Angots dotter. She received further training with Dannström with whom she travelled to the south of France, performing to enthusiastic audiences in Nice. On returning to Stockholm, in 1882 she performed in Stockholm's Royal Theatre as Nemea in Konung för en dag. She was enthusiastically applauded and received lots of flowers. She performed at the Royal Theatre until 1887 when she moved to Copenhagen to perform at the Dagmar Theatre. Her many roles there included Cherubino in The Marriage of Figaro, Rosina in The Barber of Seville and Violetta in La Traviata. Her finest performance, however, was that of Zéphyrine in Siegfried Saloman's comic opera Diamantkorset at the Stockholm première in 1886.

In 1888, she married the Danish dentist Sofus Sörensen who died in 1899. In 1901, she married his brother, the banker Fredrik Sörensen in Philadelphia. They were married until his death in 1914. She performed as a guest at the Royal Opera in Stockholm in 1893 and as Nedda in Pajazzo at the Royal Opera in Copenhagen in 1895. She also gave a number of concerts in Copenhagen.

Vendela Andersson-Sörensen died in Falkenberg, Halland, on 26 May 1926.
