= Agnes Adler =

Danish pianist

Agnes Charlotte Dagmar Adler
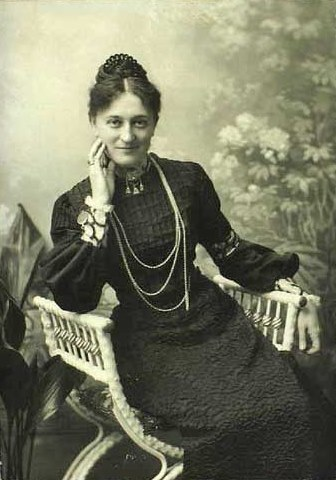
- Agnes Adler (c. 1910)
- Born: Agnes Charlotte Dagmar Hansen; 19 February 1865; Copenhagen, Denmark
- Died: 11 October 1935 (aged 70); Copenhagen, Denmark
- Occupations: Musician, Pianist

Agnes Charlotte Dagmar Adler, born Hansen (19 February 1865 in Copenhagen – 11 October 1935 at the same place was a Danish pianist. She is buried at Gentofte Kirkegård.

== Life ==
Agnes Adler was born into a musical family where her father, Carl Emilius Hansen (1834–1910), was an oboist, and her aunt, Louise Amalie Hansen (1828–79), married Hasselriis, who was a violinist. On 31 May 1892 she was married to Adolph Siegfried Adler (1838–1910) but the couple got divorced after the birth of their daughter.

== Career ==
Agnes's father pushed both Agnes and her older brother Robert Emil Hansen into musical careers. The first time she played in public was a concert at the Student's Ballroom Festival with her father and brother in 1873. Both Agnes and her brother were labeled to as prodigies, and in the following year gave many more concerts. Agnes received private tuition from Edmund Neupert, before she, in 1879, was admitted to the Royal Danish Academy of Music on a scholarship. She made her debut there in 1882 by playing Mendelssohn's piano concerto conducted by Niels W. Gade, of the Music Society.

She was also part of the Agnes Adler trio with Peder Møller (Violin) and Louis Jensen (Cello).
