= Christian Sibelius =

Finnish doctor and professor of psychiatry

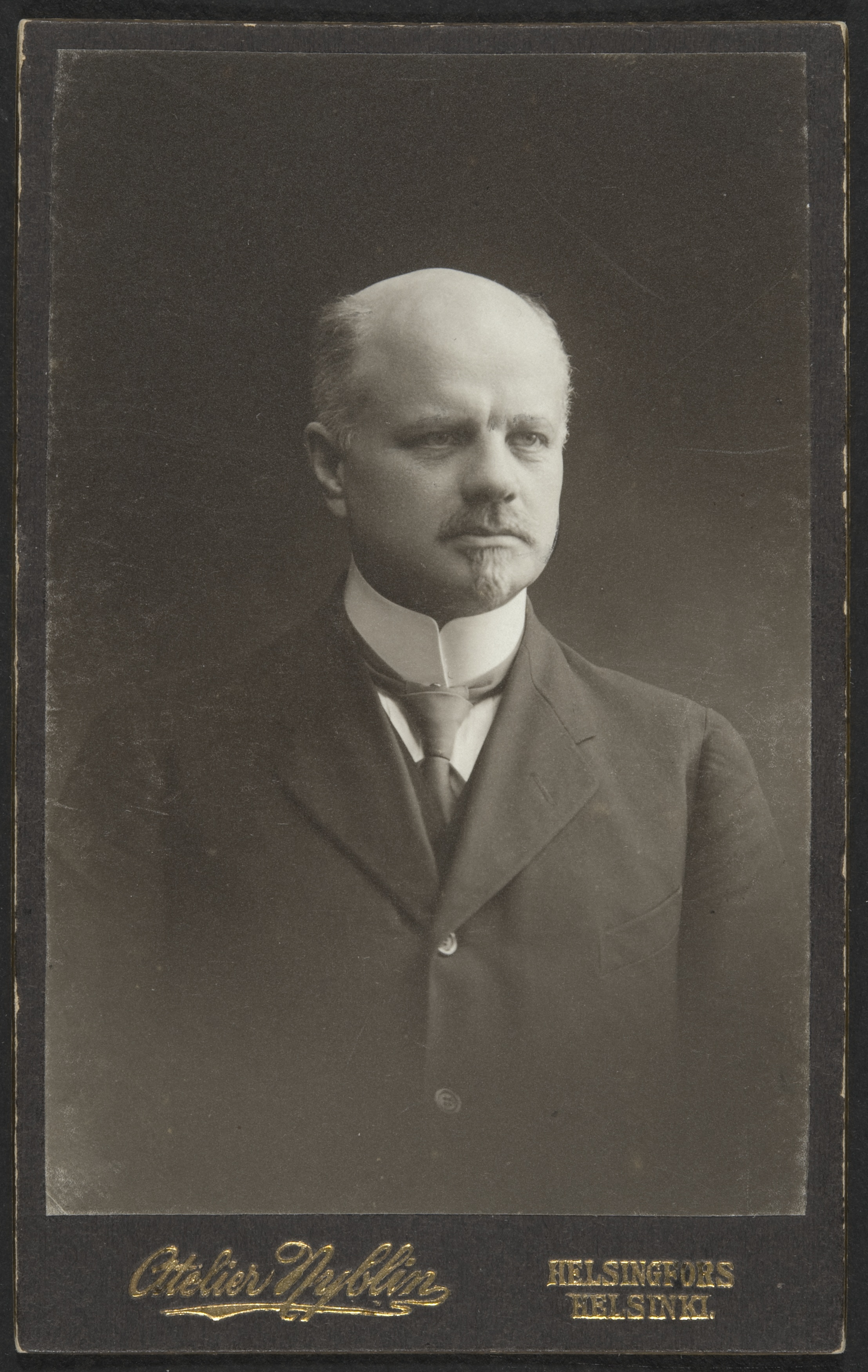
Christian Sibelius in the 1910s

Christian Sibelius (28 March 1869 – 2 July 1922) was a Finnish doctor and professor of psychiatry.

Sibelius was born in Hämeenlinna. He became a Bachelor of Arts in 1889 and a doctor of medicine in 1897, and in the same year became an associate professor of pathological anatomy at the University of Helsinki. He studied under Ernst Alexander Homén. His doctoral thesis, Bidrag till kännedomen om de histologiska förändringarna i ryggmärgen, de spinala rötterna och ganglierna vid progressiv paralysi (Contribution to the knowledge of the histological changes in the spinal cord, the spinal roots and ganglia in progressive paralysis), discussed both normal histological and pathological conditions, and demonstrated the relationship between paralysis and spinal cord damage. It placed him at once at the forefront of contemporary pathological anatomists.

His early scientific works include 'Till kännedomen om de efter amputationer uppkommande förändringarna i nervsystemet med speciell hänsyn till de spinokutana neuronerna' (in Finska läkaresällskapets Handlingar, 1897) and 'Zur Kenntniss der Entwickelungsstörungen der Spinalganglienzellen bei hereditär-luetischen missbildeten und anscheinend normalen neugeborenen' (in Zeitschrift für Nervenheilkunde, 1901). Research in Berlin from 1902 to 1905 produced 'Zur Kenntniss der Gehirnerkrankungen nach Kohlenoxydvergiftung' (in Zeitschrift für klinische Medicin, 1903) and 'Die psychischen Störungen nach akuter Kohlenoxydvergiftung' (in Monatsschrift für Psychiatrie und Neurologie, 1905).

In 1904 he moved to the Lapinlahti mental hospital (which was associated with the University of Helsinki and served as a teaching hospital for medical students) and began to conduct psychiatric research. He wrote 'Drei Falle von Caudaaffektionen' and 'Zur Kenntnis der Zweiteilung des Rückenmarkes (Diastematomyelie)' (both in Arbeiten aus der pathologischen Institution der Universitet Helsingfors, 1906–7). He became associate professor of psychiatry in 1906 and a full professor in 1909. In 1921 he became a distinguished professor of the subject. Sibelius practised extensively in the field and was a proponent of healthcare reform. Under his leadership, the Finnish Psychiatric Association was founded in 1913. He served as its president.

Like his elder brother, the celebrated composer Jean Sibelius, he was a gifted chamber musician (a cellist), and he performed with him in his youth. Sibelius was married to writer Kaino Ihanelma (Nelma) Swan (1878–1970), and they had four children. He died in Helsinki and is buried in the Hietaniemi Cemetery.
