= Peder Møller (violinist) =

Danish musician (1877–1940)

Peder Christensen Møller
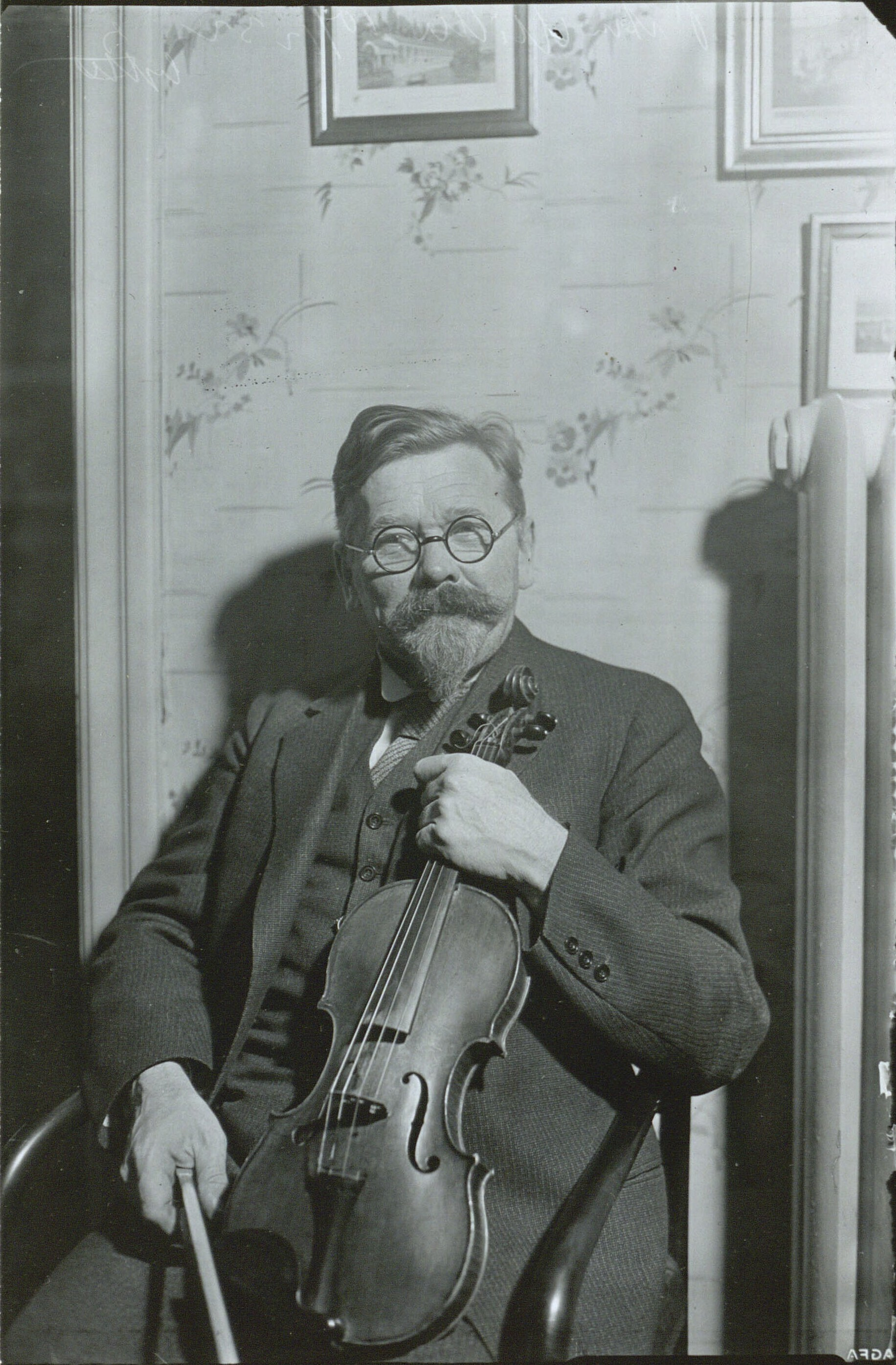
- Born: Peder Christensen Møller; 28 February 1877; Brønderslev
- Died: 1 July 1940 (aged 63); Copenhagen, Denmark
- Occupations: Musician, Violinist

Peder Christensen Møller (28 February 1877 – 1 July 1940) was an early twentieth century Danish violinist and music teacher. He is buried in Ordrup Cemetery.

== Violin Playing ==
Peder Møller inspired and premiered Carl Nielsen's violin concerto on 28 February 1912, Møller's birthday, along with Nielsen's 3rd symphony. He also performed the solo in Oslo, Stockholm, Paris, Berlin, and other locations. His dazzling technique helped establish the solo a place in the repertoire.

He also appeared as a chamber musician in the Agnes Adler trio with Agnes Adler (piano) and Louis Jensen (cello).

== Teaching ==
Peder Møller was employed in the Royal Danish Orchestra in 1910, before which he lived in Paris for 15 years.

He was also employed as a teacher at the Royal Danish Academy of Music where he taught violin to the Danish composer Knudåge Riisager, whose first composition, the String Quartet No. 1, was given its first performance by the Peder Møller Quartet in 1919.

== Scholarship Fund ==
After his death, the Peder Møller Chamber-music Memorial Fund (Danish: Kammermusikus Peder Møllers Mindefond) was established, which awarded its first scholarship of 500 kroner on February 28, 1944, to commemorate the violinist's birthday.

== Other Literature ==
- Holger Jerrild, "Hos Peder Møller", s. 96-104 i: Gads Danske Magasin, 1932.
