= Kleopatra (opera) =

Danish-language opera

Kleopatra is a Danish-language opera by August Enna to a libretto by Einar Christiansen based on the 1889 novel by H. Rider Haggard. The opera premiered in the Royal Theatre in 1895 and was performed around 20 times. In German translation, the opera was performed in Berlin, Hamburg, Cologne, Wroclaw, Riga, Zurich, Antwerp, Rotterdam and The Hague; In 1897, the opera ran for 50 performances in the opera house in Amsterdam.

== Plot ==
The opera tells the story of Prince Harmaki, who enters Queen Cleopatra's palace in order to murder her. His objective is regain power from the Romans.

== Recordings ==
- Kleopatra – Elsa Dreisig, Magnus Vigilius, Lars Möller, Kirsten Grönfeldt, Chorus of the Danish National Opera, Odense Symphony Orchestra, Joachim Gustafsson conducting, 2 CDs DaCapo, DDD, 2019 (original stage production by Den Jyske Opera with Philipp Kochheim conducting)
