= Hymn (Sibelius) =

Choral song by Jean Sibelius (1896)

- Choral song by Jean Sibelius
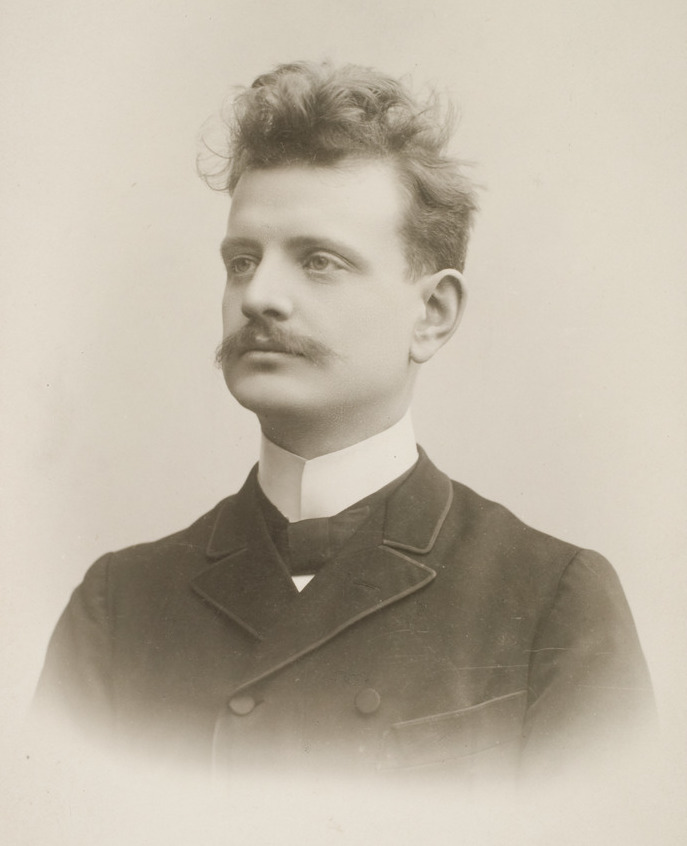
- The young composer (c. 1896)
- Opus: 21
- Text: Fridolf Gustafsson
- Language: Latin
- Composed: 1896, rev. 1898
- Publisher: Fazer & Westerlund (1898) (Note: On 20 July 1905, the Helsinki-based music publisher Fazer & Westerlund (Helsingfors Nya Musikhandel) sold its Sibelius holdings (the publishing rights and printing plates) to the German firm of Breitkopf & Härtel.)

Premiere
- Date: 26 May 1896
- Location: Helsinki, Grand Duchy of Finland
- Conductor: Jean Sibelius
- Performers: amateur male choir

External audio
- Sung by the YL Male Voice Choir
- Op. 21, Hymn

The Hymn (in Latin: Hymne; in Finnish: Hymni), Op. 21, is a choral song for male choir (TTBB) a cappella written in 1896 by the Finnish composer Jean Sibelius. The piece is a setting of the Latin-language text "Natus in curas ..." by the Finnish philologist Fridolf Gustafsson.

== History ==
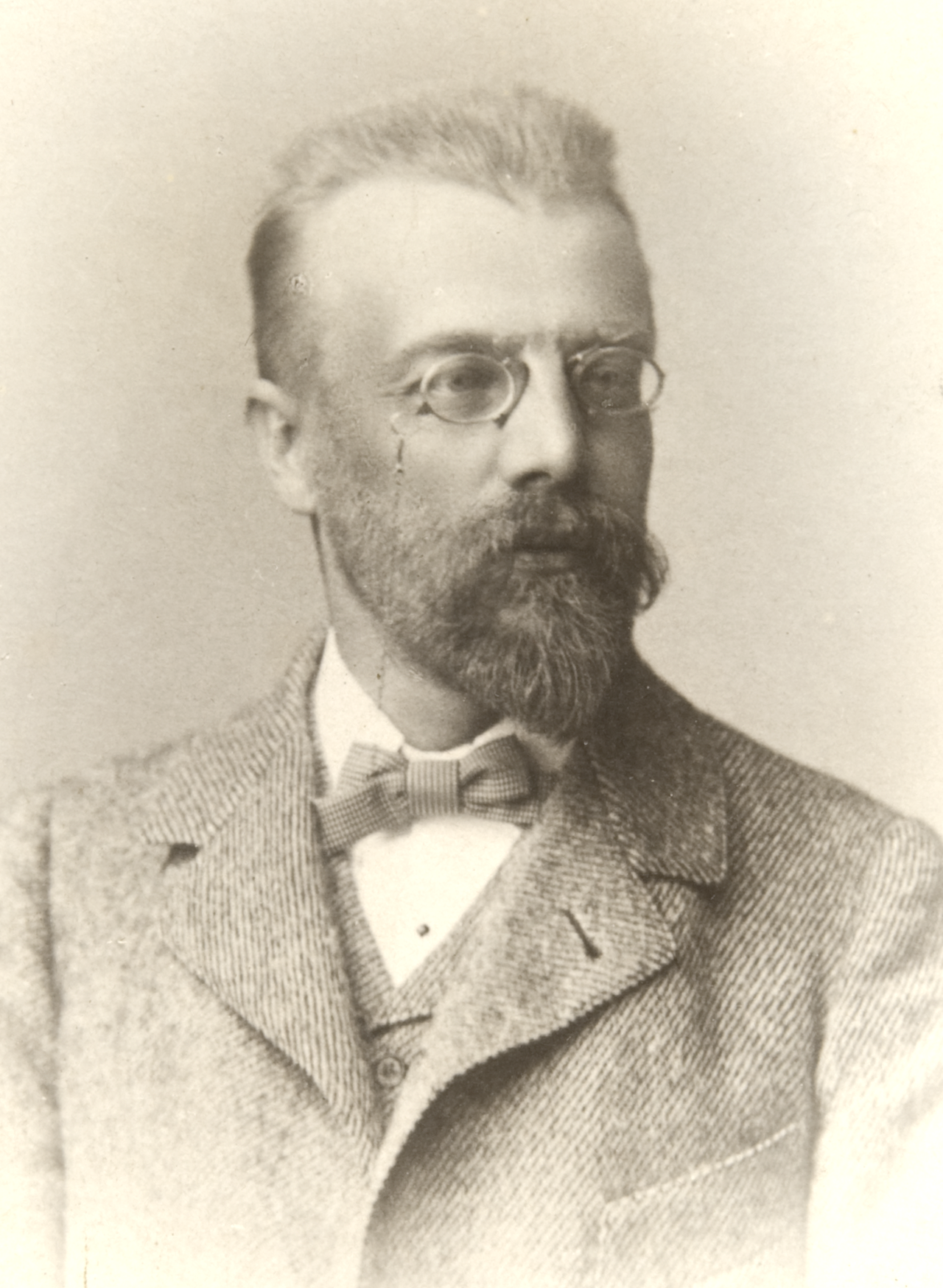
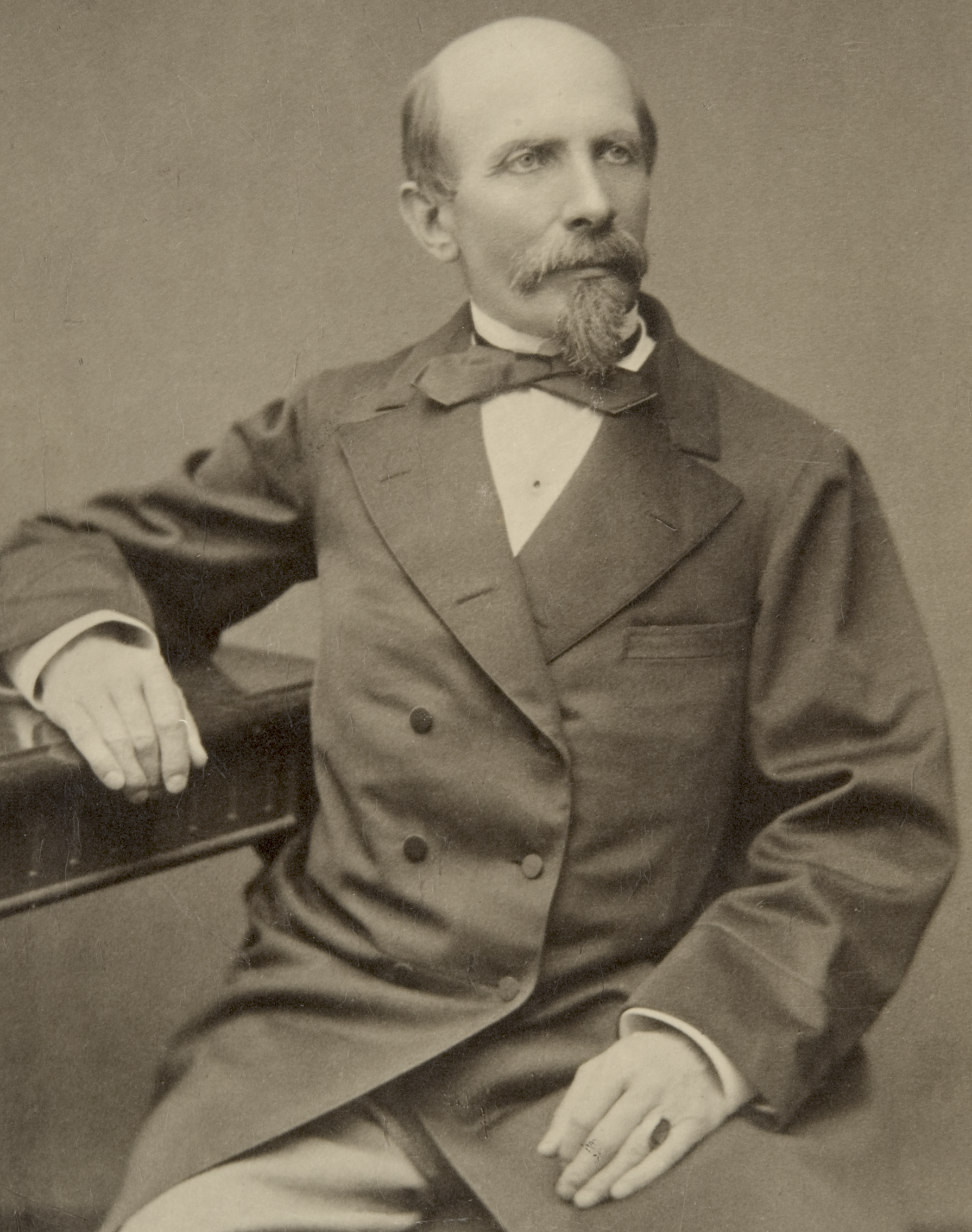
Sibelius's Hymn, to a text by Fridolf Gustafsson (left), was written for a 26 May 1896 ceremony commemorating the obstetrician J. A. J. Pippingsköld (right).

The piece premiered on 26 May 1896 in Helsinki during a ceremony dedicating a memorial stone to Josef Pippingsköld, the late professor of obstetrics at the Imperial Alexander University in Finland (now the University of Helsinki) and member of Finnish Diet; Sibelius conducted a small amateur choir in the old university graveyard.

The ceremony began with a performance of "Integer vitæ", a funereal choral song (1811) by the German composer and medical doctor Friedrich Ferdinand Flemming, which Sibelius conducted. Following this, the university's docent, Gustaf Heinricius gave a tribute that celebrated Pippingsköld's life and accomplishments, and the memorial event concluded with the performance of Sibelius's new choral piece. The newspaper Hufvudstadsbladet reviewed Sibelius's Hymn as follows: "The simple opening act was brought to a particularly impressive end by a hymn Jean Sibelius had composed for the occasion in the old Italian style. This did not fail to affect those present".

In 1898, Sibelius made minor revisions to the Hymn. Helsinki's Fazer & Westerlund (Helsingfors Nya Musikhandel) published the revised version in 1898, although this first edition was superseded in 1906 when the German-based firm of Breitkopf & Härtel—having bought Fazer's Sibelius contracts and plates in 1905—issued a reprint. The original, however, is extant, and each version takes about four minutes to perform.

== Music ==
The tempo marking is Moderato, the time signature is 3/2, and the key is with one sharp. Eventually, the song transitions to a middle section marked Un pochissimo allegro and with no sharps or flats. The Hymn then concludes as it began.

== Notes, references, and sources ==
=== Sources ===
- "Statsrådet J. Pippingskölds" [State Councilor J. Pippingsköld]. Hufvudstadsbladet (in Swedish). No. 140. 26 May 1896. p. 3.
- "Invigningen af statsrådet J.A.J. Pippingskölds grafvärd" [The Inauguration of State Councilor J.A.J. Pippingsköld's Gravestone]. Nya Pressen (in Swedish). No. 140. 26 May 1896. p. 2.
- Barnett, Andrew (2007). Sibelius. New Haven, Connecticut: Yale University Press. ISBN 978-0-300-16397-1.
- Dahlström, Fabian [in Swedish] (2003). Jean Sibelius: Thematisch-bibliographisches Verzeichnis seiner Werke [Jean Sibelius: A Thematic Bibliographic Index of His Works] (in German). Wiesbaden: Breitkopf & Härtel. ISBN 3-7651-0333-0.
