= Symphonic Dances (Grieg) =

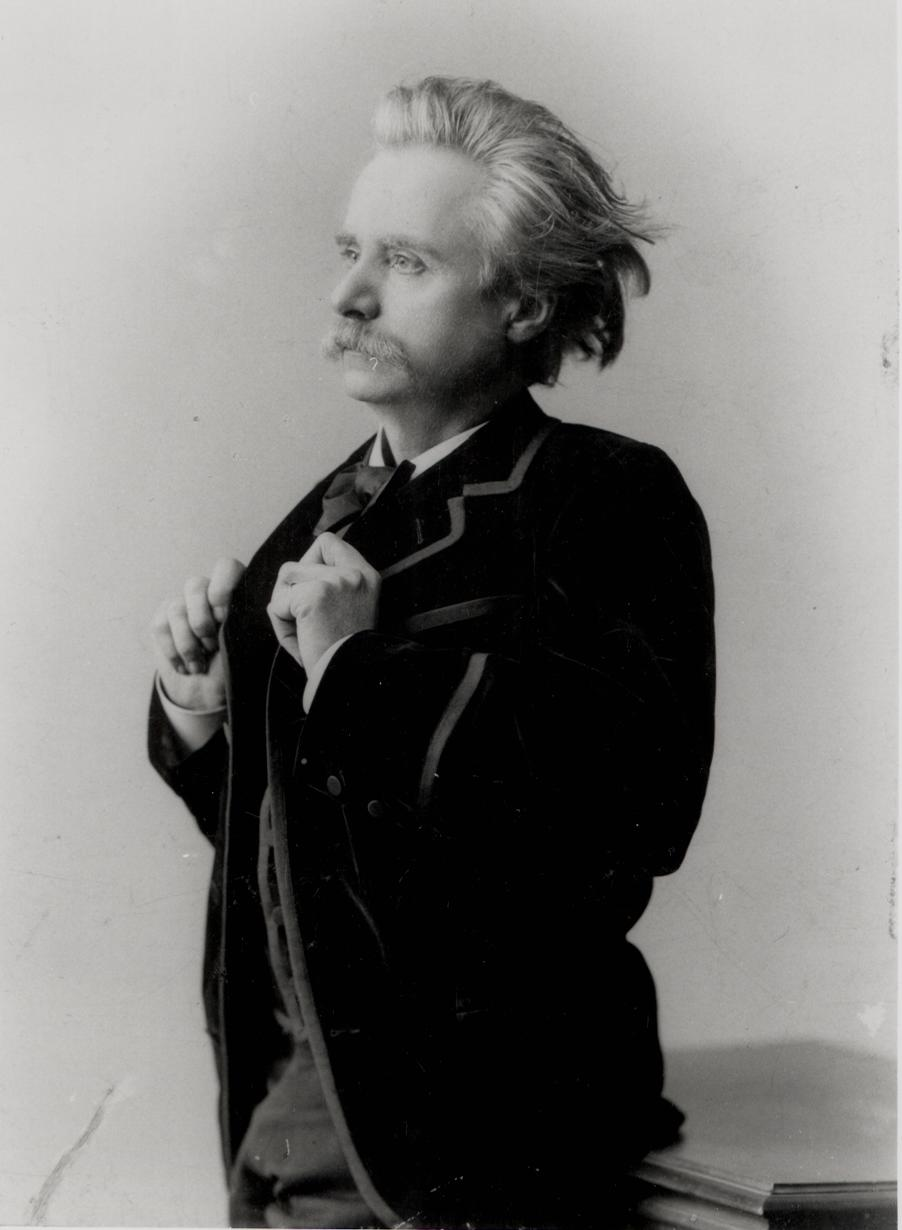
Edvard Grieg in 1897

The four Symphonic Dances Op. 64 by the Norwegian composer Edvard Grieg were written c. 1896 and published in 1897.

They draw their inspiration from the earlier folk works collected by Ludvig Mathias Lindeman.

- Dance No. 1, G major, Allegro moderato e marcato
- Dance No. 2, A major, Allegretto grazioso
- Dance No. 3, D major, Allegro giocoso
- Dance No. 4, A minor, Andante - Allegro risoluto
