= August Enna =

Danish composer (1859–1939)

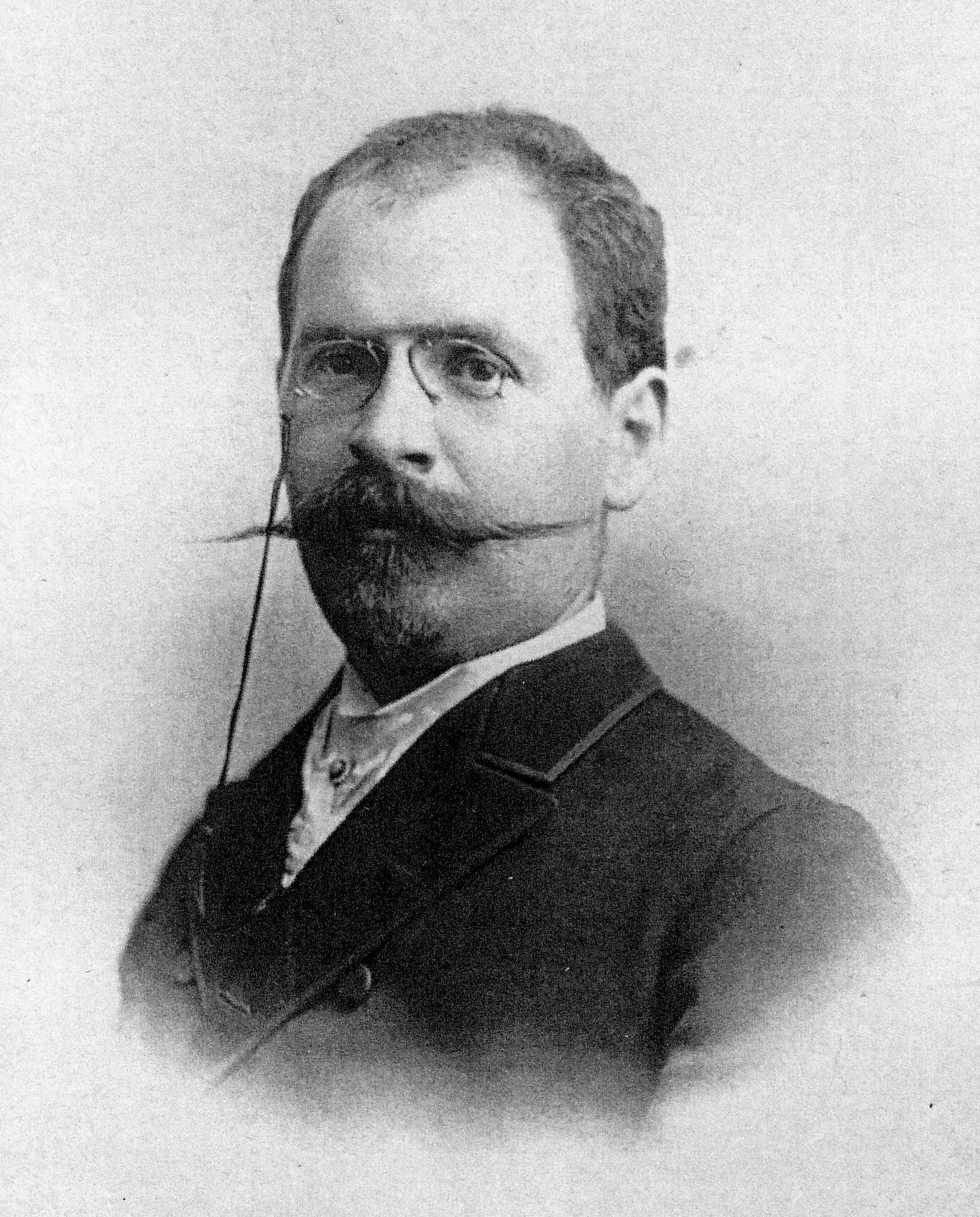
August Enna, 1892.

August Enna (13 May 1859 – 3 August 1939) was a Danish composer, known mainly for his operas.

== Biography ==
Enna was born in Nakskov, Lolland, Denmark, but his ethnic origins lay in Sicily. His grandfather, an Italian by birth, had emigrated to Denmark with his German-born wife after the Napoleonic Wars (in which he served as a soldier).

In 1870 the family moved to Copenhagen, where Enna became a shoemaker's apprentice (his father was a shoemaker) and received music lessons. He became a violinist and performed in Finland and Sweden. In 1883 he returned to Denmark to become music director at Werner's Theatre Company, a travelling touring theatre.

In 1884, he composed his first opera, Agleia, some piano pieces and instrumental works, and in 1886 a symphony (in C minor) which attracted the interest of Niels Gade. In 1890/91 he was conductor at the Dagmar Theatre in Copenhagen. After that he lived from composing and short-term engagements. In 1908 he became an adjunct professor.

In 1892, his groundbreaking work, the opera The Witch, was premiered. He then had great success with other operas, including Cleopatra (1894), The Little Match Girl (1897), Gloria Arsena (1917) and The Comedians (1920). Several of these were performed on various European stages, for example in Berlin, Hamburg, Weimar, Magdeburg and Cologne.

In addition, he wrote songs, two symphonies (in D minor and E major), a violin concerto, chamber music and piano pieces. Strongly influenced by Wagner's music, he was himself an influence on Danish composers, such as Carl Nielsen.

Enna was a knight of the Order of the Dannebrog. He was buried in Frederiksberg in the old cemetery.

== Music ==
Like many composers of his generation, Enna wrote in a late romantic style that would go out of fashion by the time he died in 1939. By then he was almost forgotten. The only work of his entire output that still appears on the concert programs is the overture to The Little Match Girl. The overture contains all the themes as a concentrate of the small one-act opera, which lasts just over half an hour.

Enna's concert music takes advantage of the resources of the stage music of Wagner and Verdi as much as from the Danish romantic tradition. He understood the pacing of music for theater, had a fine melodic gift and mastered the art of orchestration of his era. Enna's operas, with their combination of welcoming, singable melody and great Wagnerian orchestral richness, proved to be a successful export product. In addition, he wrote a number of unpretentious and practical works intended for performance in small Danish provincial theaters with limited resources. Of these, several of the operas had popular H.C. Andersen titles.

The late romantic Danish composers in the first half of the 20th century received limited attention abroad and few chances to have their music performed, and accordingly after the First World War Enna's time as a successful composer was over. In the prime of his youth, he had stood among the most internationally performed Danish opera composers, but eventually fell into poverty during the last years of his life.

== Works ==
=== Operas ===
- En Idyl, Operetta (1881)
- Qui pro quo, Lustspiel (1882)
- En landsbyhistorie, Operetta [1883)
- Areta, Operetta (1884)
- Agleia, Opera (1884; never performed)
- The Witch, Opera, Op. 5 (1889)
- Udløst, Incidental music for a play (1891)
- Aucassin and Nicolete, Opera (1895)
- Kleopatra - opera in Danish (1895)
- Den lille Pige med Svovlstikkerne (The Little Girl with the Matches), One-act opera in Danish, Op. 12 (1897)
- Kongesønner (1897)
- Lamia, Opera (1899)
- Hyrdinden og Skorstensfejeren, Pantomime/ballet (1900)
- Prinsessen på ærten, Opera, Op. 10 (1900)
- Ib og lille Christine, Opera/melodrama (1902)
- Trylledrikken, Vocal drama (1902)
- Ung elskov, Opera, Op. 13 (1903). Re-working of Lamia.
- Santa Cæcilias guldsko, Ballet/pantomime (1905)
- Hallfred Vandraadeskjald, opera on a libretto by Holger Drachmann (1906)
- Yduns Æbler, Vocal drama (1906)
- Bellman, Theatrical music in 4 scenes (1907)
- Nattergalen, Opera, Op. 20 (1912)
- Gloria Arsena, Opera, Op. 21 (1913)
- Kronbruden (1913)
- Elskovs guld, Pantomime (1914)
- The Comedians, Opera (1916)
- Børnene fra Santa-Fé, Opera (1918)
- Don Juan Maraña, Opera (1925)
- Afrodites præstinde, Opera, not performed (1925)
- Kysset, Ballet (1927)
- Ghettoens dronning, Opera, not performed (1932)

=== Symphonies ===
- Symphony No. 1 in C minor (1886)
- Symphony No. 2 in E major (1908)

=== Concertante works ===
- Violin Concerto in D major (1897)
- Romance for Violin and Orchestra (1898)

=== Other orchestral works ===
- Concert overture (1880)
- Suite for Orchestra (c. 1884)
- Scherzo on a Poem by Sophus Michaëlis (1896)
- Fairytales, four symphonic pictures (1905)
- Hans Christian Andersen, Festival Overture (1905)

=== Choral music ===
- Kantate til Industri- og Haandværkerforeningens udstilling i Nakskov (1898)
- Mutterliebe (1907)
- Historien om en moder (1907)

=== Chamber music ===
- Adagio for Violine (1880)
- Romance for Violine (1880)
- Barcarolle for Violin and Piano (1898)

=== Songs ===
- Tre sange på volapük (1887)
- Rusland, Moder (1927)
- Vidste du? (1937-39)
- Rosenknoppen (1940-42)

=== Piano ===
- Fem Klaverstykker (1887)
- Skitsebogen (1904-05)
- Små noveller (1904-05)
- Poetiske tonebilleder (1904-09)
- Kleine Novellen für Klavier (1909)
- Lyrisches Album für Klavier (1912)
- Valses amoroso (1917)
