= 1973 in Norwegian music =

The following is a list of notable events and releases of the year 1973 in Norwegian music.

== Events ==
=== January ===
- Kirsti Sparboe and Erik Bye win the 1972 Spellemannprisen in the female and male vocalist categories respectively. Popol Vuh, Philharmonic Company Orchestra, Birgitte Grimstad, Einar Schanke, Egil Monn-Iversen, Bør Børson Jr. and Sigurd Jansen also receive the award. Knutsen & Ludvigsen win in the category "Music for children" and Jens Book-Jenssen win the Special Award.

=== May ===
- 23
  - The 21st Bergen International Festival started in Bergen, Norway (May 23 – June 6).
  - The 1st Nattjazz started in Bergen, Norway (May 23 – June 6).

=== August ===
- 26 – The 4th Kalvøyafestivalen started at Kalvøya near by Oslo.

=== Unknown date ===
- The popular chart show Norsktoppen debuts on NRK Radio.

== Albums released ==
=== Unknown date ===
G

Jan Garbarek

- Witchi-Tai-To (ECM Records), with Jan Garbarek-Bobo Stenson Quartet
- Triptykon (ECM Records), with Arild Andersen and Edward Vesala

K

Webe Karlsen & Kjell Karlsens Orkester

- To Navn I Barken (Polydor Records)

N

Lillebjørn Nilsen

- Portrett (Polydor Records)

P

Popol Vuh

- Quiche Maya (Polydor Records)

R

Inger Lise Rypdal

- Fra 4 Til 70 (Talent Records)

S

Saft

- Stev, Sull, Rock & Rull (Philips Records)

Øystein Sunde

- Sunderfundigheter (Philips Records)

T

Arve Tellefsen

- Schostakowitsch: Violinkonzert Op. 77 (BASF Records), with the Swedish Radio Symphony Orchestra, conducted by Gary Bertini

== Deaths ==
May

- 6 – Ola Isene, opera singer (baritone) and actor (born 1898).
- 11 – Odd Grüner-Hegge, opera singer (baritone) and actor (born 1899).

== Births ==
February

- 11 – Varg Vikernes, black metal musician (Burzum).

April

- 15 – Jørgen Træen, record producer, musician (guitar, keyboards and bass guitar) and elektronika artist.

May

- 6 – Asbjørn Blokkum Flø, composer, musician and sound artist.
- 24 – Hallgeir Pedersen, jazz guitarist.

June

- 3 – Ronny "Ares" Hovland, metal vocalist, guitarist and bassist (Aeternus).
- 4 – Gunhild Seim, jazz trumpeter and composer.
- 23 – Henning Kraggerud, violinist and composer.
- 27 – Olve "Abbath" Eikemo, black metal musician (Immortal).

July

- 7 – Oddleif Stensland, progressive/power metal vocalist and guitarist (Communic).
- 8 – Magne Thormodsæter, Jazz upright bassist and composer.
- 29 – Jono El Grande, composer, band leader, guitarist and conductor.

August

- 11 – Torbjørn Sletta Jacobsen, jazz saxophonist and composer.

September

- 4 – Wetle Holte, jazz drummer and composer.
- 7
  - Eivind Buene, contemporary composer.
  - Thomas T. Dahl, jazz guitarist, music teacher and composer (Krøyt and Dingobats).
- 21 – Fredrik Wallumrød, jazz drummer and composer.

October

- 2 – Lene Nystrøm, singer-songwriter (Aqua).
- 3
  - Eirik Hegdal, jazz saxophonist, composer, arranger and music teacher.
  - Kari Rueslåtten, soprano singer, songwriter and keyboardist.
  - Marius Reksjø, jazz upright bassist.

November

- 3 – Eivind Austad, jazz pianist, composer, and music teacher.
- 6 – Ann-Mari Edvardsen, coloratura soprano opera singer and keyboardist.
- 9 – Silje Wergeland, singer, songwriter and pianist (The Gathering).

December

- 10 – Thomas Tofthagen, guitarist (Audrey Horne and Sahg).
- 18 – Christian Jaksjø, jazz trombonist.
- 24 – Grutle Kjellson, progressive Viking metal vocalist and bass player (Enslaved).
- 29 – Maja Ratkje, vocalist and composer.

Unknown date

- Eivind Opsvik, jazz upright bassist and composer.
- Pål Angelskår, singer and songwriter (Minor Majority).

== See also ==
- 1973 in Norway
- Music of Norway
- Norway in the Eurovision Song Contest 1973
