= Seven Runeberg Songs =

Collection of art songs by Jean Sibelius (1891–1892)

- Song collection by Jean Sibelius
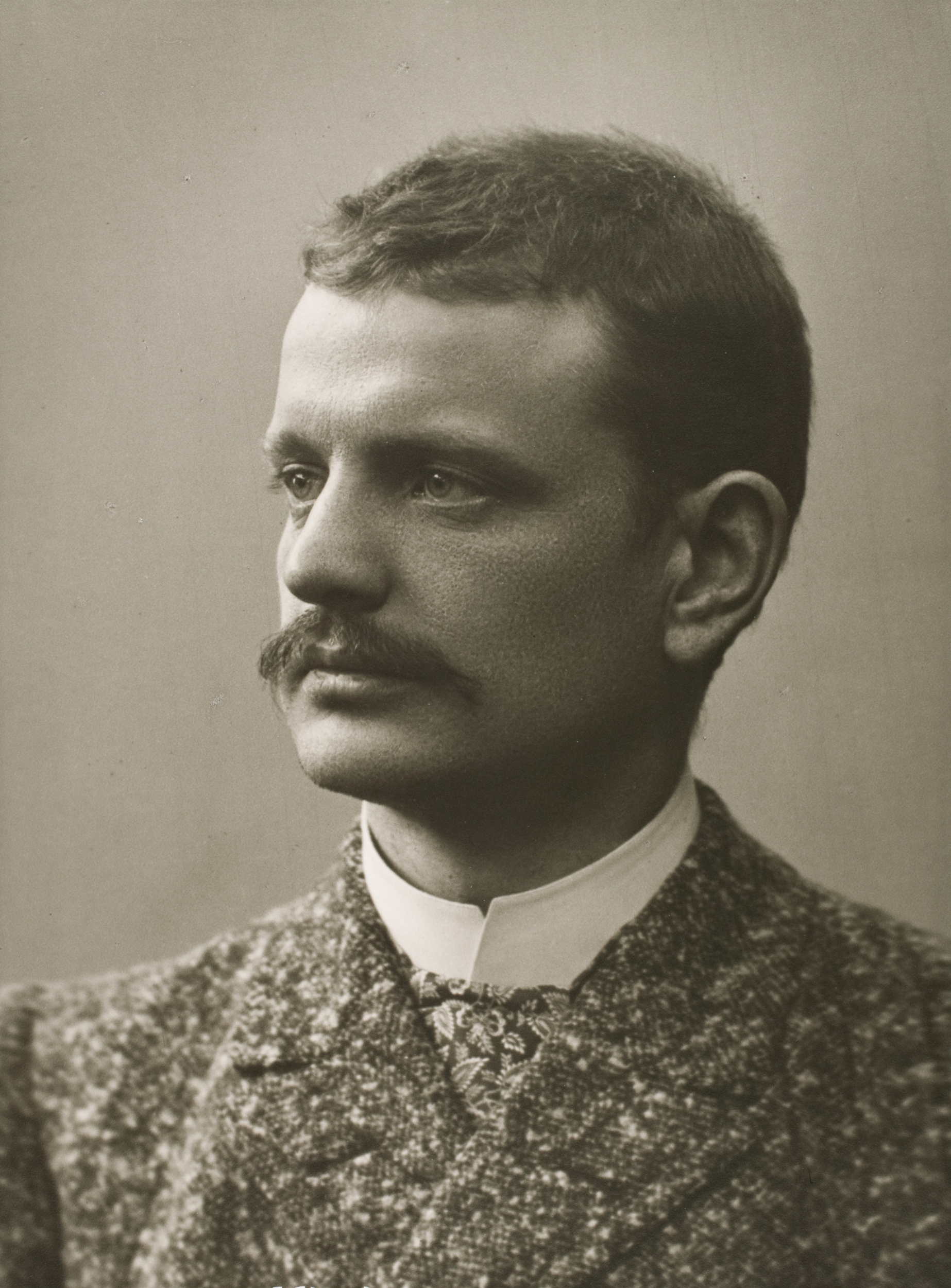
- The composer (c. 1891)
- Opus: 13
- Language: Swedish
- Composed: 1891–1892; No. 4 orch. 1913

External audio
- Sung by Anne Sofie von Otter, accompanied by Bengt Forsberg
- No. 1, "Under strandens granar"
- No. 2, "Kyssens hopp"
- No. 3, "Hjärtats morgon"
- No. 4, "Våren flyktar hastigt"
- No. 5, "Drömmen"
- No. 6, "Till Frigga"
- No. 7, "Jägargossen"

The Seven Runeberg Songs, Op. 13, (Note: Because Sibelius's Op. 13 songs are sung in Swedish, this article gives preference to each song's native title, rather than the English translation.) is a collection of Swedish-language art songs for vocal soloist and piano written from 1891 to 1892 by the Finnish composer Jean Sibelius; (Note: All but a few of Sibelius's songs are settings of Swedish-language poems (quantitatively, his favorite poets were Ernst Josephson, Johan Ludvig Runeberg, Viktor Rydberg, and Karl August Tavaststjerna) and are with piano accompaniment. While many are of high quality, they largely have been neglected outside the Nordic realm, due to the limited coverage (in terms of number of speakers) of Swedish (relative to, for example, German or French).) each is a setting of a poem by the Finnish poet Johan Ludvig Runeberg.

== Constituent songs ==
Ordered by catalogue number, the Op. 13 songs are as follows:

- "Under strandens granar" ("Under the Fir-Trees"), Op. 13/1 (1892)
- "Kyssens hopp" ("The Kiss's Hope"), Op. 13/2 (1892)
- "Hjärtats morgon" ("The Heart's Morning"), Op. 13/3 (1891)
- "Våren flyktar hastigt" ("Spring is Flying"), Op. 13/4 (1891)
- "Drömmen" ("The Dream"), Op. 13/5 (1891)
- "Till Frigga" ("To Frigga"), Op. 13/6 (1892)
- "Jägargossen" ("The Young Huntsman"), Op. 13/7 (1891)

=== Orchestral version of No. 4 ===
In 1913, Sibelius arranged "Våren flyktar hastigt" for vocalist and orchestra.

== Notes, references, and sources ==
=== Sources ===
- Barnett, Andrew (2007). Sibelius. New Haven, Connecticut: Yale University Press. ISBN 978-0-300-16397-1.
- Dahlström, Fabian [in Swedish] (2003). Jean Sibelius: Thematisch-bibliographisches Verzeichnis seiner Werke [Jean Sibelius: A Thematic Bibliographic Index of His Works] (in German). Wiesbaden: Breitkopf & Härtel. ISBN 3-7651-0333-0.
- Layton, Robert (1993) [1965]. Sibelius. (The Master Musicians Series) (4th ed.). New York: Schirmer Books. ISBN 0028713222.
