= Ulf Grahn =

Swedish composer (1942–2023)

Ulf Grahn (January 17, 1942 – January 25, 2023) was a Swedish composer born in Solna. He lived the majority of his life in the United States specifically in the Washington, D.C. area.

== Life and education ==
Between 1962 and 1970, Grahn studied music primarily with Hans Eklund at the Stockholm City College and subsequently at the Royal College of Music, Stockholm.He earned degrees at the Stockholm Institute of Music Pedagogy and after moving to America in 1972, the Catholic University of America, and has also studied business administration, economics, and development at Uppsala and Lund.

Ulf Åke Wilhelm Grahn died January 25, 2023 after a battle with large B cell CNS lymphoma.

== Career ==
In 1974 Grahn and his wife, the pianist Barbro Dahlman, founded the Contemporary Music Forum, which presents performances of works by living European and American composers, and he was its program director until 1984. Since 1985, he has operated the music publisher Edition NGLANI. In 1988–89, he was artistic and managing director of the Lake Siljan Music Festival in Sweden.

He taught at music schools in Stockholm and Lidingö and in the US at Catholic University of America, at Northern Virginia Community College and from 1983 to 1987 at George Washington University. As of 2001, he teaches Swedish language and culture at the Foreign Service Institute.

== Works ==
Grahn's works include two symphonies, the second of which was commissioned by the Royal Stockholm Philharmonic Orchestra, two ballets, an instrumental opera for wind quintet (commissioned for Mälarkvintetten), and numerous works for piano and chamber ensembles including the 1975 Concerto for Viola d'Amore and Ten Instruments commissioned by Joseph Ceo and the 1983 Sonata for Violin and Piano commissioned by the Library of Congress. Several of his works feature the marimba. His music is modern but accessible to a general audience. A review in The New York Times described his 1982 Eldorado, a commissioned setting of a poem by Edgar Allan Poe, as "[having] caught the dreamy death-obsession of the text in a gamelan-textured instrumental context, the gamelan being evoked through piano preparations", and reviews in the Washington Post have described his Through the Passage of Time for recorder (also 1982) as "clever and acrobatic", his 1988 Celebration for solo marimba as "intricate and buoyant", and his 1991 Three Short Pieces for String Quartet, originally composed for piano, as "seem[ingly] so idiomatic for strings, with their shimmering, overlapping lines and delicate interplay, that it is hard to imagine a piano being able to make much sense of them", although his song cycle From Dusk to Dawn was described as "[having] some interesting things to say but did not stop when it had said them."

He has also received commissions from Contemporary Music Forum, Levin School of Music, Musik i Södermanland and numerous individuals.

== Discography ==
- Quadrants Release Date: September 25, 2012 Catalog Number: NV5883 Navona Records

== Personal ==
Grahn was hospitalized for cancer treatment in 1986 and worked on a commissioned work there; he recovered the following year.

== Articles ==
- Scandinavian Music, By Lon Tuck - The Washington Post, published May 21, 1983
