= Violin Concerto (Riisager) =

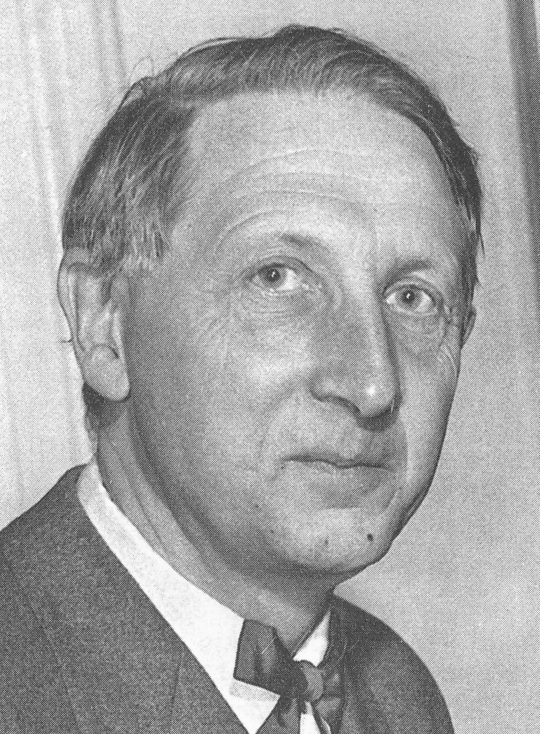
Knudåge Riisager

The Violin Concerto in A minor, Op. 54 was written by Danish composer Knudåge Riisager in 1950–1951 for violinist Wandy Tworek, to whom it is dedicated. Tworek gave its first performance with conductor Nicolai Malko at a Thursday Concert on 11 October 1951. There is a second, revised, version of the concerto, which was performed for the first time by Kai Laursen at Gothenburg. The approximate duration is 23 minutes.

== Structure ==
The concerto has only two movements, a calm, meditative Tranquillo and a brilliant Vivo, the latter being in the sonata form.

== Recordings ==
- (1973.V) Kai Laursen, Aarhus Symphony Orchestra, Aksel Wellejus — (2009) DANACORD DACOCD 467-468
- (2017.VI) Ian van Rensburg, Aarhus Symphony Orchestra, Andreas Delfs — (2019) dacapo 8.226145
