= Arild Sandvold =

Norwegian musician and composer

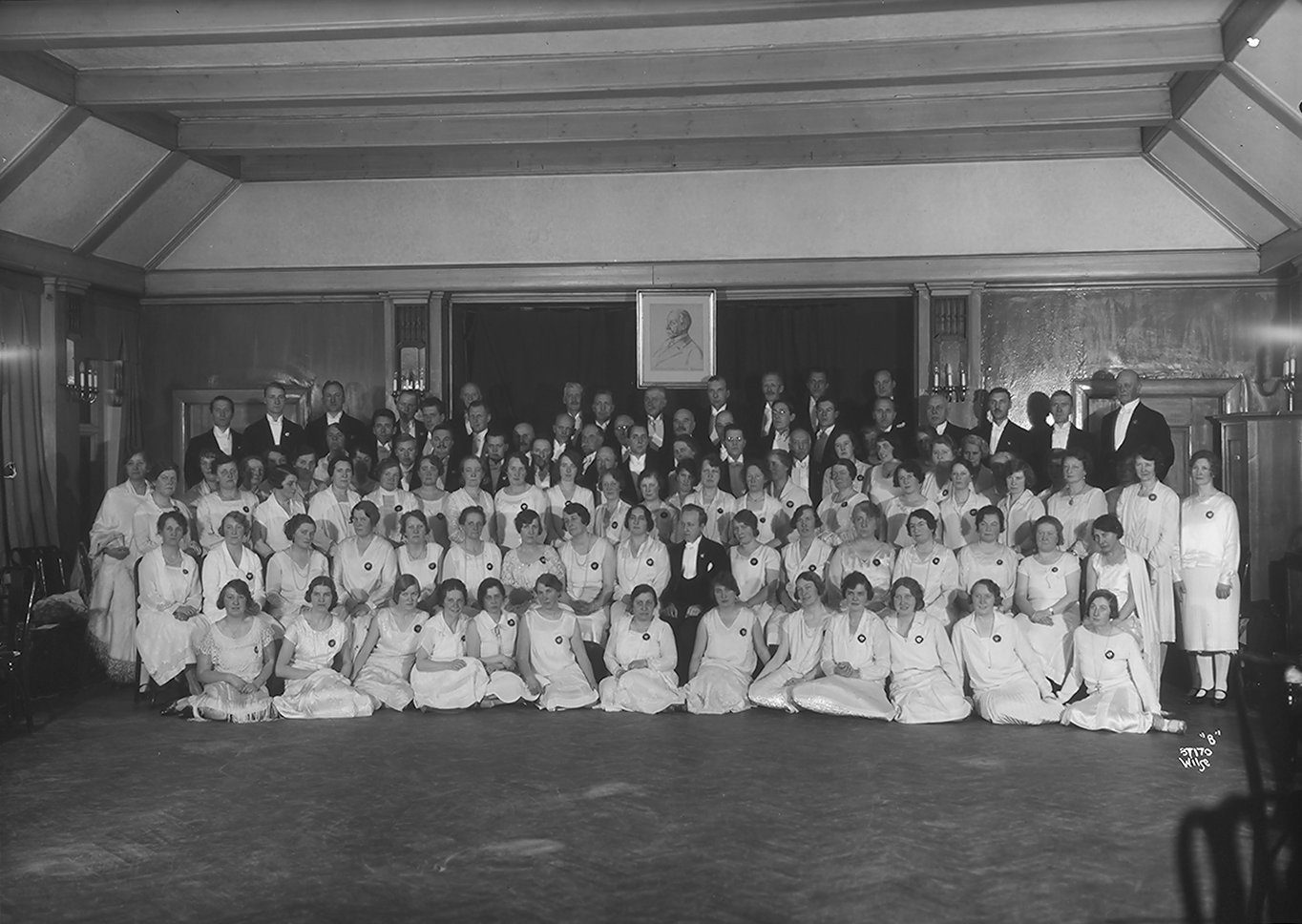
Arild Sandvold (center) with his St. Cecilia Society choir in 1930

Arild Edvin Sandvold (June 2, 1895 – August 12, 1984) was a Norwegian organist, composer, and choir conductor.

Sandvold spent most of his career as the cathedral organist and cantor at Oslo Cathedral and as an organ teacher at the Oslo Conservatory of Music, now the Norwegian Academy of Music, for more than 50 years. Sandvold was the director of the St. Cecilia Society choir (Norwegian: Cæciliaforeningen) from 1928 to 1957.

Sandvold studied for several years in Oslo under Hilmar Grønner and Gustav Fredrik Lange, among others, before he traveled to Leipzig, where he studied organ playing under Karl Straube. In Leipzig Sandvold, heard Max Reger's organ music and this had a major influence on him. This influence is most clearly reflected in his major organ work Introduction and Passacaglia in B Minor.

== Awards and recognitions ==
In 1949, Sandvold was named a knight 1st class of Norway's Order of St. Olav. In 1953 he was named a knight 1st class of the Order of the Lion of Finland. In 1964 he was appointed a member of the Royal Swedish Academy of Music, and in 1965 he was made a commander of the Order of St. Olav. Sandvold was a Freemason and for many years was a cantor in the Norwegian Order of Freemasons.

== Selected works ==
Selected compositions by Sandvold include:

- Opus 4: Introduksjon og passacaglia h-moll (Introduction and Passacaglia in B Minor)
- Opus 5: Seks improvisasjoner over norske folketoner (Six Improvisations on Norwegian Folk Melodies):
  - Herre Gud, ditt dyre navn og ære (Lord God, Thy Precious Name and Glory)
  - Eg veit i himmerik ei borg (I Know a Castle in Heaven)
  - Gud, la oss i din kunnskap fremmes (God, Let Us Be Sustained by Thy Wisdom)
  - Høyr kor kyrkjeklokka lokkar (Hear How the Church Bells Beckon)
  - Overmåde fullt av nåde (Imbued with Grace Abundant)
  - Hos Gud er idel glede (In God Is Sheer Joy)
- Opus 9: Orgelsonate f-moll (Organ Sonata in F Minor):
  - Largo maestoso – Allegro – Fuge (Largo maestoso – Allegro – Fugue)
  - Adagio Dess-dur (Adagio in D-Flat Major, originally an intermezzo in the sonata)
