= Väinö Raitio =

Finnish composer (1891–1945)

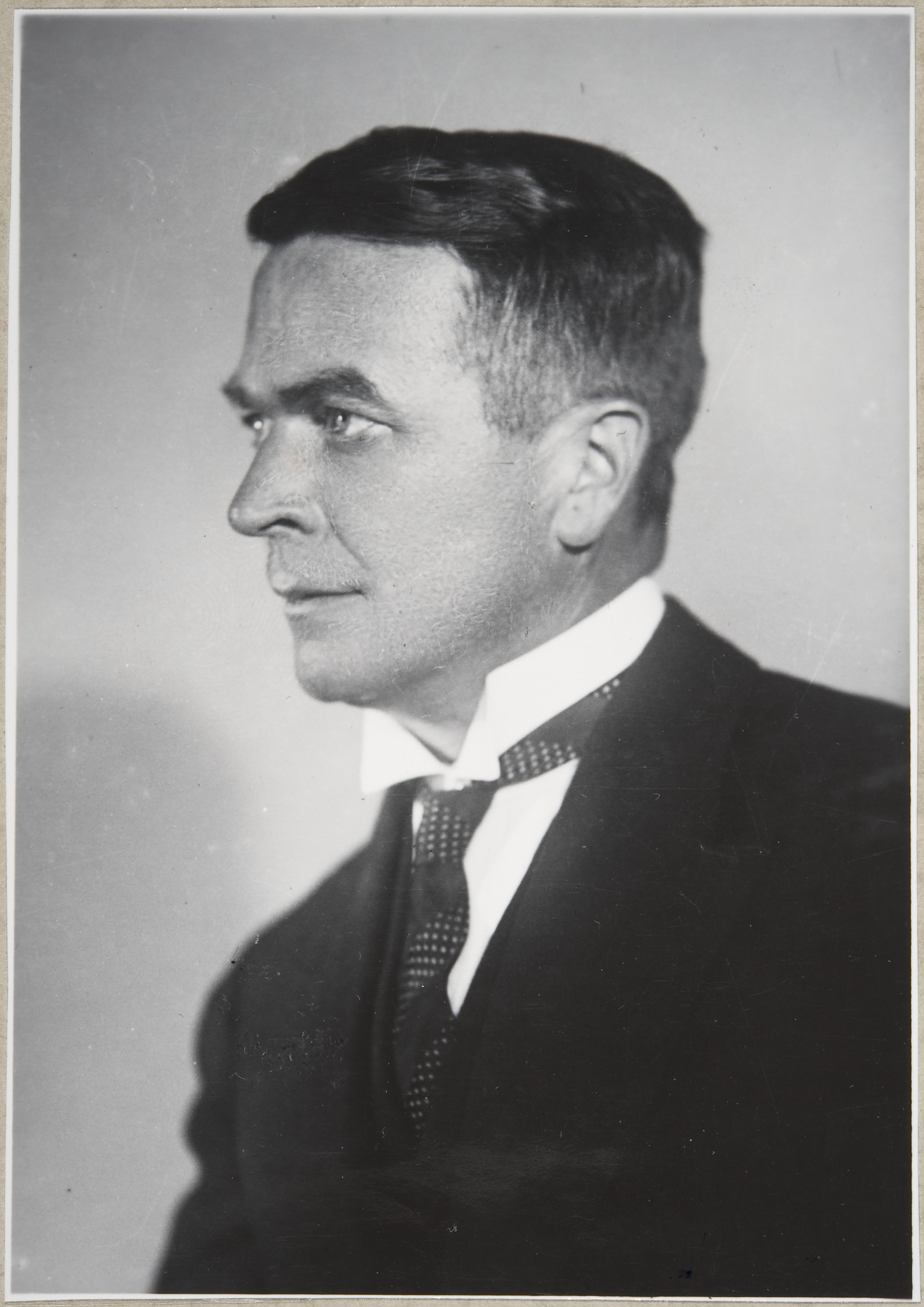
Väinö Raitio

Väinö Eerikki Raitio (15 April 1891 – 10 September 1945) was part of the small group of composers who appeared in the Finnish art music scene in the 1920s with a new cosmopolitan music style, very different from the dominant conservative National Romanticism. He was born in Sortavala, Grand Duchy of Finland.

Raitio's career as a composer reached its peak in the 1920s when eight large symphonic poems appeared from his pen. Influenced by Alexander Scriabin, his style was too modern for Nordic music circles, and his orchestral work Joutsenet (The Swans, Les Cygnes) of 1919 remained as his sole orchestral piece to be published (in 1938).

Raitio's profile as a composer slipped, as he concentrated on shorter works for smaller ensembles in the 1930s and 1940s. In private, however, much effort was made by the composer to write operatic works. He died in Helsinki. Even today, his five operas are only known from the composer's hand-written manuscripts.

== Works ==
=== Early period (–1919) ===
- Toccata in G minor op. 1
- Violin Sonata in F sharp minor op. 2
- Preludium for cello (or violin) and piano op. 3(b)
- Summer Idylls for piano op. 4
- Six Songs for voice and piano op. 5
- Piano concerto op. 6
- Poème for cello and orchestra op. 7
- Five Pieces for piano op. 8
- Symphonic Ballade op. 9
- String Quartet in G minor op. 10
- Symphony in G Minor op. 13

=== Reaching maturity (1919–1920s) ===
- Joutsenet op. 15 ('The Swans'/'Les Cygnes')
- Piano Quintet in C sharp minor, op. 16
- Nocturne op. 17
- Fantasy for quintet op. 19
- Fantasia estatica op. 21
- Four Colour poems for piano op. 22
- Antigone Trilogy op. 23
- Moonlight on Jupiter op. 24
- Fantasia poetica op. 25
- The Pyramide for mixed choir and orchestra op. 27
- The Avenue for soprano and orchestra op. 29

=== Back to traditional forms (1930s–40s) ===
- Suite Summer Scenes from Häme
- Forest Idylls
- Scherzo Felix domestica
- Legend for violin and orchestra
- Double concerto for violin, cello and orchestra
- The Maids on the Headlands
- Idyll
- Notturno for violin and orchestra
- Serenata for violin and orchestra
- Fantasy for cello, harp and orchestra

=== Stage works ===
- 5 Operas:
  - Jeftan tytär (The Daughter of Jephtha), op. 30 (1929)
  - Prinsessa Cecilia (Princess Cecilia) (1933)
  - Lyydian kuningas (The King of Lydia) (1937)
  - Väinämöisen kosinta (Väinämöinen's Proposal) (1934–1936)
  - Kaksi kuningatarta (The Two Queens)
- Ballet The Waterspout (Vesipatsas)
- Le ballet grotesque
