= Carl Gustav Sparre Olsen =

Norwegian violinist and composer

Carl Gustav Sparre Olsen (April 25, 1903 – November 8, 1984) was a Norwegian violinist and composer with a lyrical composition style and folk influences.

== Life ==
Carl Gustav Sparre Olsen was born in Stavanger, Norway. When he was a year old, the family moved to Copenhagen, but settled in Oslo during 1909. From 1922, he studied violin with Herman van der Vegt. In 1923, he became a violinist at the Oslo Philharmonic. He continued there for the next ten years. From 1926 until 1930, he received instruction in composition from Norwegian composer Fartein Valen. He also traveled to Berlin, Germany to study with composer Max Butting from 1930-31. He conducted for the Bergen Trade Unions Choir . Olsen was also a critic for the newspaper Bergens Tidende.

=== Composer ===
Olsen wrote a significant amount of large choral pieces, orchestral works, and songs. In the 1920s, his music was primary inspired by Norwegian folk songs and is considered harmonically influenced by Norwegian composer Edvard Grieg. His later music is miniaturist in nature, his compositional style likened to that of Fartein Valen, his compositional instructor. In the 1930s, he composed large instrumental works inspired by Norwegian poet Olav Aukrust. He also wrote Nine Wood-reliefs with Colours, music for paintings by Norwegian painter and sculptor Dagfinn Werenskiold (1892–1977) .

In 1937, he composed Draumkvædet and some cantatas. He composed music for orchestra, chamber ensembles, and choir and orchestra similar to Faure's Requiem. The most important work that stemmed after World War II were the Seven Songs to Poems. The poems were written by Norwegian writer Inge Krokann. Around this period he composed Nidarosdomen, an orchestral piece. Other important works include Ver Sanctum for choir and orchestra, Frå Telemark, a folk song for piano and Leitom-suite for piano.

=== Later years ===
Sparre Olsen was a member of the Norwegian National Broadcasting Council from 1950-58. He also published two biographical writings, Percy Grainger (1963) and Tor Jonsson (1968). In 1968, he received the honor of Knighthood in the Royal Norwegian Order of St. Olav. He died in 1984 in Lillehammer and his urn was placed in Lom stave church in Gudbrandsdal.

== Selected works ==
- Canto 1
- Draumkvædet
- Frå Telemark
- Leitom-suite
- Nidarosdomen
- Nine Wood-reliefs with Colours
- Nocturne for flute and horn, op. 57, no. 2
- Norsk kjærleikssong (Norwegian Love Song) for viola or cello and piano, Op.36 No.3
- Seven Songs to Poems
- Tre Dialoger (Three Dialogues) for flute and viola, Op.50 (1976)
- Ver sanctum

== Other sources ==
- Gaukstad, Øystein Sparre Olsen bibliography (in "Metamorfose. Festskrift til C. G. Sparre Olsen". Universitetsforlaget, 1983) ISBN 82-7093-024-5
