= Rolf Gammleng =

Norwegian musician

- Born: 5 January 1898; Moss, Norway
- Died: 3 September 1984 (aged 86)
- Occupations: Violinist; Organizational leader

Rolf Gammleng (5 January 1898 – 3 September 1984) was a Norwegian violinist and organizational leader.

Gammleng was born in Moss, Norway. He chaired Norsk Musikerforbund from 1945, and served as president of Nordisk Musikerunion from 1952 to 1955. From 1959 to 1966 he was a member of the Norwegian Broadcasting Council.

The Gammleng Award is named after him.
