= List of years in Norwegian music =

This page indexes the individual year in Norwegian music pages. Each year is annotated with a significant event as a reference point.

2010s - 2000s - 1990s - 1980s - 1970s - 1960s - 1950s - 1940s - 1930s - 1920s - 1910s - 1900s - 1890s - 1880s - Pre-1880s

== 2020s ==
- 2026 in Norwegian music, death of Kåre Grøttum.

== 2010s ==
- 2019 in Norwegian music
- 2018 in Norwegian music, deaths of Asmund Bjørken, Bjørn Boysen, Bjørn Lie-Hansen, Leif Rygg, Mikhail Alperin, Ove Stokstad, and Tor Brevik.
- 2017 in Norwegian music, deaths of Arild Engh, Atle Hammer, Dag Østerberg, Egil Kapstad, Egil Monn-Iversen, Jan Høiland, Jan Arvid Johansen, Knut Borge, Øyvind Klingberg, and Ståle Wikshåland.
- 2016 in Norwegian music, deaths of Andris Snortheim, Fred Nøddelund, Harald Devold, Hanna-Marie Weydahl, Ivar Thomassen, Jan Henrik Kayser, Jon Klette, Kari Diesen Jr., Knut Wiggen, Leif Solberg, Lilleba Lund Kvandal, Per Øien, Rolf Andersen, Sverre Kjelsberg, Terje Fjærn, and Willy Andresen.
- 2015 in Norwegian music, Eirik Hegdal awarded Jazz Spellemannprisen; deaths of Erik Amundsen, Gerd Gudding, Ketil Vea, Natalia Strelchenko, Nora Brockstedt, Per Hjort Albertsen, Simon Flem Devold, and Svein Christiansen.
- 2014 in Norwegian music, Marius Neset and Trondheim Jazz Orchestra awarded Jazz Spellemannprisen; Sigbjørn Apeland awarded Vossajazzprisen; deaths of Almar Heggen, Inga Juuso, Jan Groth, John Persen, Kåre Kolberg, Knut Nystedt, Olav Dale, and Svein Nymo.
- 2013 in Norwegian music, Karin Krog and John Surman awarded Jazz Spellemannprisen; Tore Brunborg awarded Vossajazzprisen; deaths of Aase Nordmo Løvberg, Alex Naumik, Dag Schjelderup-Ebbe, Egil Hovland, Eivind Rølles, Kaare Ørnung, Kjell Lund, Knut Nesbø, Lage Fosheim, Ole Henrik Moe, Rolf Graf, Rolv Wesenlund, Sverre Bruland, and Yngve Moe.
- 2012 in Norwegian music, Sidsel Endresen and Stian Westerhus awarded Jazz Spellemannprisen; Tore Brunborg awarded Buddyprisen; deaths of Anne-Lise Berntsen, Edvard Hagerup Bull, Eivin One Pedersen, Frode Thingnæs, Harry W. Kvebæk, Odd Børretzen, Totti Bergh, and Trond Bråthen.
- 2011 in Norwegian music, Ola Kvernberg awarded Jazz Spellemannprisen; Mari Kvien Brunvoll awarded Vossajazzprisen; deaths of Børt-Erik Thoresen, Dag Stokke, Eyvind Solås, Eline Nygaard Riisnæs, Harald Johnsen, Hilde Heltberg, Paul Weeden, and Sølvi Wang.
- 2010 in Norwegian music, Elephant9 awarded Jazz Spellemannprisen; deaths of Amalie Christie, Arne Nordheim, Dag Frøland, Gustav Lorentzen, Jack Berntsen, Knut Stensholm, Kristian Bergheim, and Willy Bakken.

== 2000s ==
- 2009 in Norwegian music, deaths of Arne Bendiksen, Bjørg Lødøen, Björn Haugan, Eva Gustavson, Gerhard Aspheim, Kjell Bartholdsen, and Torstein Grythe.
- 2008 in Norwegian music, deaths of Antonio Bibalo, Eivind Solberg, Fredrik Friis, Harald Heide-Steen Jr., and Henki Kolstad.
- 2007 in Norwegian music, deaths of Grethe Kausland, Robert Burås, and Thomas Hansen.
- 2006 in Norwegian music, birth of Angelina Jordan; deaths of Arne Dørumsgaard, Eva Knardahl, Ingrid Bjoner, Jan Werner Danielsen, Kenneth Sivertsen, and Lasse Myrvold.
- 2005 in Norwegian music, deaths of Ivar Medaas, Lars Kristian Brynildsen, Mikkel Flagstad, and Vidar Sandbeck.
- 2004 in Norwegian music, deaths of Arild Nyquist, Bjørnar Andresen, Carsten Klouman, Erik Bye, Jon Bratt Otnes, Kjell Bækkelund, Ørnulf Gulbransen, Sigurd Køhn, and Terje Bakken.
- 2003 in Norwegian music, birth of Aksel Rykkvin; deaths of Hallvard Johnsen, Knut Albrigt Andersen, and Ola Calmeyer.
- 2002 in Norwegian music, birth of Birgitta Elisa Oftestad; deaths of Bjørn Johansen, Egil Storbekken, Sigurd Berge, and Stein Ove Berg.
- 2001 in Norwegian music, deaths of Gro Anita Schønn and Ludvig Nielsen.
- 2000 in Norwegian music, deaths of Beate Asserson, Greta Gynt, Joachim «Jokke» Nielsen, Ole Jacob Hansen, Randi Hultin, and Svein Finnerud.

== 1990s ==
- 1999 in Norwegian music, deaths of Arne Sletsjøe, Jens Book Jenssen, Johan Kvandal, Gunnar Brunvoll, and Marius Müller.
- 1998 in Norwegian music, birth of Ella Marie Hætta Isaksen; deaths of Egil Johansen, Hans W. Brimi, and Robert Normann.
- 1997 in Norwegian music, birth of Alan Walker; deaths of Alfred Næss, Arnljot Kjeldaas, Karsten Andersen, and Søren Gangfløt.
- 1996 in Norwegian music, births of Adelén Rusillo Steen, Astrid Smeplass, and Aurora Aksnes; deaths of Anne-Marie Ørbeck, Arne Hendriksen, Maj Sønstevold, Per Asplin, and Robert Levin.
- 1995 in Norwegian music, birth of Malin Reitan
- 1994 in Norwegian music, births of Agnete Johnsen, Guro Kleven Hagen, Jo David Meyer Lysne, Julie Bergan, and Signe Førre; deaths of Finn Arnestad, Hans Stenseth, Rowland Greenberg, and Soffi Schønning.
- 1993 in Norwegian music, births of Chris Holsten, Debrah Scarlett, Eline Thorp, Fredrik Halland, and Rohey Taalah; deaths of Arvid Fladmoe, Cissi Cleve, and Øystein Aarseth.
- 1992 in Norwegian music, births of Elisabeth Lid Trøen, Ingrid Søfteland Neset, Krissy Matthews, Lukas Zabulionis, Mathias Stubø, and Siril Malmedal Hauge; deaths of Elisabeth Granneman, Finn Ludt, and Harald Sæverud.
- 1991 in Norwegian music, births of Andreas Skår Winther, Bendik Baksaas, Emil Solli-Tangen, Henrik Lødøen, Kjetil Mulelid, Kygo and Monica Heldal; deaths of Bjarne Nerem, Gunnar Sønstevold, Ingebrigt Davik, Jan Wølner, Kurt Foss, Magne Elvestrand, and Øistein Ringstad.
- 1990 in Norwegian music, births of Alexandra Joner, Bjørn Johan Muri, Charlotte Dos Santos, Dagny Norvoll Sandvik, Eldbjørg Hemsing, Hanne Leland, Ingebjørg Bratland, Iselin Solheim, Mette Henriette, Ole Mofjell, Patrik Svendsen, and Torgeir Standal; deaths of Per Bergersen, Sigbjørn Bernhoft Osa, and Thorbjørn Egner.

== 1980s ==
- 1989 in Norwegian music, births of Amina Sewali, Berit Hagen, Christian Skår Winther, Hans Hulbækmo, Ingrid Helene Håvik, Jakob Terjesønn Rypdal, Kristoffer Eikrem, Magnus Skavhaug Nergaard, Marius Njølstad, Matias Tellez, and Trond Bersu; deaths of Conrad Baden, and Fred Lange-Nielsen.
- 1988 in Norwegian music, births of Andreas Wildhagen, Chriss Rune Olsen Angvik, Christian Meaas Svendsen, David Aleksander Sjølie, Fredrik Luhr Dietrichson, Jan Martin Gismervik, Natalie Sandtorv, Ragnhild Hemsing, and Tone Damli Aaberge; deaths of Peter L. Rypdal and Robert Riefling.
- 1987 in Norwegian music, births of Aleksander Denstad With, Anja Lauvdal, Bendik Brænne, Bjørn Marius Hegge, Bjørnar Kaldefoss Tveite, Cashmere Cat, Didrik Solli-Tangen, Hanna Paulsberg, Hanne Kalleberg, Harald Lassen, Heida Mobeck, Ida Jenshus, Ingrid Helene Håvik, Kim-Erik Pedersen, Marte Eberson, Mikhael Paskalev, Moddi, Sandra Lyng, Thea Hjelmeland, Tine Thing Helseth, and Trygve Waldemar Fiske; deaths of Aage Samuelsen, Eva Prytz Øivind Bergh, Signe Amundsen, Torbjørn Knutsen, and Trygve Henrik Hoff.
- 1986 in Norwegian music, births of Ellen Andrea Wang, Emilie Stoesen Christensen, Espen Wensaas, Jakop Janssønn Hauan, Jon Audun Baar, Jonas Kilmork Vemøy, Lars Ove Fossheim, Maria Mena, Miss Tati, Philip Schjetlein, Stella Mwangi, Susanne Sundfør, Thomas Wærnes, Vilde Frang, and William Wiik Larsen; deaths of Bias Bernhoft, Eyvind Hesselberg, Hans-Jørgen Holman, Svein Øvergaard, and Thorgeir Stubø.
- 1985 in Norwegian music, births of Alexander Rybak, André Roligheten, Anine Stang, Carina Dahl, Catharina Chen, Caroline "Dina" Lillian Kongerud, Ellen Brekken, Eyolf Dale, Gabrielle Leithaug, Gunnhild Sundli, Ine Hoem, Jon Rune Strøm, Kim Johannesen, Kristoffer Lo, Linni Meister, Margaret Berger, Maria Arredondo, Marius Neset, Odd Steinar Albrigtsen, Øystein Skar, Per Arne Ferner, Siri Nilsen, Tore Sandbakken, Trygve Wiese, and Vivian Sørmeland; deaths of Christian Hartmann, Olav Kielland and Stephan Henrik Barratt-Due.
- 1984 in Norwegian music, births of Anders Brørby, Andrea Rydin Berge, Anja Eline Skybakmoen, Aylar Lie, Frida Ånnevik, Ida Maria, Ina Wroldsen, Jo Berger Myhre, Jo Skaansar, Jørgen Mathisen, Jorun Stiansen, Kristoffer Kompen, Lars Vaular, Mari Kvien Brunvoll, Marika Lejon, Marion Raven, Nathalie Nordnes, Steinar Aadnekvam, and Trond Bersu; deaths of Arild Sandvold Carl Gustav Sparre Olsen, and Rolf Gammleng.
- 1983 in Norwegian music, births of Andreas Stensland Løwe, Andreas Ulvo, Benedicte Maurseth, Carmen Elise Espenæs, Eivind Lønning, Espen Berg, Gard Nilssen, Gaute Ormåsen, Guro Skumsnes Moe, Henrik Maarud, Marit Larsen, Myrna Braza, Rune Nergaard, Sigrun Tara Øverland, Svein Magnus Furu, and Tuva Syvertsen; deaths of Finn Mortensen and Øivin Fjeldstad.
- 1982 in Norwegian music, births of Admiral P, Anders Hana, Anders Jektvik, Andreas Lønmo Knudsrød, Daniel Herskedal, Even Helte Hermansen, Gunnar Greve, Håvard Lothe, Hedvig Mollestad Thomassen, Isak Strand, Kristin Minde, Maria Solheim, Marthe Valle, Ørjan Hartveit, Øyvind Hegg-Lunde, Øyvind Skarbø, Petter Vågan, Simen Aanerud, Sondre Lerche, Stephan Meidell, Therese Birkelund Ulvo, and Torbjørn Schei; deaths of Jonas Brunvoll, Jr. and Radka Toneff.
- 1981 in Norwegian music, births of Amund Maarud, Andreas Loven, Cato Sundberg, Erlend Slettevoll, Erlend Tvinnereim, Fredrik Mikkelsen, Gjermund Larsen, Hilde Marie Kjersem, Ingrid Olava Ivar Loe Bjørnstad, John Olav Nilsen, Julian Berntzen, Kim Myhr, Lars Fredrik Frøislie, Ola Kvernberg, Sigurd Hole, Solveig Heilo, and Todd Terje; deaths of Geirr Tveitt and Reimar Riefling.
- 1980 in Norwegian music, births of Andreas Amundsen, Christina Bjordal, Christoffer Andersen, Ingrid Bolsø Berdal, Jenny Hval, Jørgen Munkeby, Kim André Arnesen, Kjetil Mørland, Lars Horntveth, Lena Nymark, Øystein Moen, Pål Hausken, Silje Nes, Siri Wålberg, Stian Omenås, and Thomas J. Bergersen; deaths of Bjørn Fongaard and Sverre Bergh.

== 1970s ==
- 1979 in Norwegian music, births of Alf Wilhelm Lundberg, Anders Danielsen Lie, Anita Auglend, Audun Ellingsen, Benedikte Shetelig Kruse, Bjørn Vidar Solli, Christer-André Cederberg, Espen Reinertsen, Eth Eonel, Einar Selvik, Hanne Sørvaag, Heidi Skjerve, Hermund Nygård, Ingunn Ringvold, Jan Erik Mikalsen, Jostein Hasselgård, Kenneth Kapstad, Magnus Loddgard, Marcus Paus, Maria Haukaas Mittet, Martin Sjølie, Mathias Eick, Noora Noor, Ole Morten Vågan, Ørjan Matre, Ove Alexander Billington, Peter Espevoll, Ragnhild Furebotten, Robert Post, Sampda Sharma, Stein Urheim, Stian Westerhus, Susanna Wallumrød, Thomas Dybdahl, and Tora Augestad; deaths of Elling Enger, Ernst Glaser, Klaus Egge and Trygve Lindeman.
- 1978 in Norwegian music, births of Amund Svensson, Ane Carmen Roggen, Børge-Are Halvorsen, Daniel Heløy Davidsen, Esben Selvig, Even Ormestad, Ida Roggen, Ingfrid Breie Nyhus, Jan Thore Grefstad, Joachim Kwetzinsky, Jonas Howden Sjøvaag, Julie Dahle Aagård, Karin Park, Kurt Nilsen, Lage Lund, Lorentz Aspen, Marita Røstad, Morten Qvenild, Nikolai Eilertsen, Ola Gjeilo, Silvia Moi, Steinar Nickelsen, Stian Hinderson, Sven Garas, Tarjei Strøm, Terje Bakken, Tore Bruvoll, Trond Frønes, Venke Knutson, and Vibeke Stene; death of Bjarne Brustad.
- 1977 in Norwegian music, births of Andre Lindal, Andreas Haddeland, Anine Kruse, Anne Nørdsti, Anne Lilia Berge Strand, Arve Isdal, Asbjørn Lerheim, Atle Nymo, Brynjar Rasmussen, Christer Espevoll, Christian Ingebrigtsen, Cornelius Jakhelln, David Wallumrød, Deeyah Khan, Emil Nikolaisen, Erik Faber, Even Granås, Even Kruse Skatrud, Frøy Aagre, Gunilla Süssmann, Håkon Kornstad, Håvard Stubø, Helena Iren Michaelsen, Ivar Bjørnson, Julius Lind, Kirsti Huke, Kjersti Horn, Mads Berven, Mads Hauge, Martin Horntveth, Morten Veland, Olav Iversen, Ole Jørn Myklebust, Pål Mathiesen, Per Zanussi, Ruben Sverre Gjertsen, Sven Atle Kopperud, Terje Winterstø Røthing, Tor Egil Kreken, Tor Magne Glidje, Tore Johansen, Torstein Lofthus, Torun Eriksen, and Trond Bråthen; deaths of Eivind Groven, Kristian Hauger, Sissel Vera Pettersen, and Trygve Torjussen.
- 1976 in Norwegian music, births of Andreas Mjøs, Ane Brun, Brynjard Tristan, Desirée Sparre-Enger, Erik Dæhlin, Erlend Jentoft, Freddy Wike, Håkon Thelin, Hilde Louise Asbjørnsen, Ian Kenneth Åkesson, Ivar Grydeland, Ivar "Ravi" Johansen, Jan Werner Danielsen, Jarle Bernhoft, Johannes Sæbøe, Jostein Gulbrandsen, Karl Strømme, Kjartan Salvesen, Kjell-Ole Haune, Kjetil Møster, Kjetil Steensnæs, Kristoffer Rygg, Lars Nedland, Liv Kristine Espenæs, Marianne Thorsen, Marita Solberg, Morten "Opaque" Aasdahl Eliassen, Nell Sigland, Olaf Olsen, Ole Børud, Øyvind Torvund, Roger Arntzen, Shaun Bartlett, Sivert Høyem, Stella Getz, Stian Shagrath Thoresen, and Thom Hell; deaths of Berit Brænne, Edvard Fliflet Bræin, Erling Kjellsby, Leif Rustad, and Ragnar Danielsen.
- 1975 in Norwegian music, births of Alexander Stenerud, Andy LaPlegua, Aslak Hartberg, Bertine Zetlitz, Bjarte Ludvigsen, Chrystalief, Eirik Glambek Bøe, Erik Johannessen, Erlend Øye, Ernst Simon Glaser, Espen Aalberg, Frode Haltli, Frode Nymo, Geir Zahl, Gisle Torvik, Håkon Mjåset Johansen, Håvard Jørgensen, Håvard Wiik, Helge Lien, Jannike Kruse, Janove Ottesen, John Erik Kaada, Kåre Opheim, Kate Havnevik, Kolbjørn Lyslo, Kristian Eivind "Gaahl" Espedal, Lars Andreas Haug, Lars K. Hustoft, Lars Petter Hagen, Marianne Beate Kielland, Mats Eilertsen, Morten Furuly, Ole Marius Sandberg, Øystein Brun, Øyvind Storesund, Robert Burås, Rolf-Erik Nystrøm, Rune Eriksen, Sigurd Wongraven, Simen Eriksrud, Sondre Meisfjord, Steinar Raknes, Thomas "Pest" Kronenes, and Vegard Sverre Tveitan; deaths of Brita Bratland and Paul Okkenhaug.
- 1974 in Norwegian music, births of Anders Aarum, Anders Hunstad, Bård Guldvik Eithun, Beate S. Lech, Bernt Moen, Børre Dalhaug, Carl-Michael Eide, Chris Summers, Christian Blom, Daniel Salte, Erik Hedin, Frode Glesnes, Frode Jacobsen, Frode Kjekstad, Henning Solvang, Hild Sofie Tafjord, Jens Fredrik Ryland, Jørn H. Sværen, Kåre Nymark, Kenneth Ekornes, Knut Aalefjær, Knut Schreiner, Knut Magne Valle, Krister Dreyer, Lars Eikind, Lars Skoglund, Lasse Marhaug, Ole Moe, Ovidiu Cernăuțeanu, Øystein Greni, Paal Nilssen-Love, Sjur Miljeteig, Terje Vik Schei, Tom Cato Visnes, and Tomas Thormodsæter Haugen; deaths of David Monrad Johansen and Olav Gurvin.
- 1973 in Norwegian music, births of Ann-Mari Edvardsen, Asbjørn Blokkum Flø, Christian Jaksjø, Eirik Hegdal, Eivind Austad, Eivind Buene, Eivind Opsvik, Flint Juventino Beppe, Fredrik Wallumrød, Grutle Kjellson, Gunhild Seim, Hallgeir Pedersen, Henning Kraggerud, Jono El Grande, Jørgen Træen, Kari Rueslåtten, Kjetil-Vidar Haraldstad, Lene Nystrøm, Magne Thormodsæter, Maja Ratkje, Marius Reksjø, Oddleif Stensland, Olve Eikemo, Pål Angelskår, Ronny Hovland, Silje Wergeland, Thomas T. Dahl, Thomas Tofthagen, Tor Ingar Jakobsen, Torbjørn Sletta Jacobsen, Varg Vikernes, and Wetle Holte; deaths of Odd Grüner-Hegge and Ola Isene.
- 1972 in Norwegian music, births of Annar Follesø, Arve Moen Bergset, Christer Fredriksen, Ketil Gutvik, Odd Nordstoga, Øyvind Nypan, Roger Johansen, Roger "Infernus" Tiegs, Siri Gjære, Ted Arvid Skjellum and Thomas Strønen; deaths of Alf Hurum, Kari Aarvold Glaser, and Sverre Jordan.
- 1971 in Norwegian music, births of Christian Wallumrød, Erland Dahlen, Frode Berg, Gylve Fenris Nagell, Håvard Fossum, Helén Eriksen, Helge "Deathprod" Sten, Ingar Zach, Ingebrigt Håker Flaten, Isak Rypdal, Jacob Holm-Lupo, Kim Ljung, Kristin Asbjørnsen, Øyvind Brandtsegg, Rita Engedalen, Solveig Slettahjell, Stian Carstensen, Tommy Tee, Trygve Seim, and Unni Wilhelmsen.
- 1970 in Norwegian music, births of Anja Garbarek, Bjørn Bolstad Skjelbred, Eldbjørg Raknes, Eskil Brøndbo, Even "Magnet" Johansen, Harald Johnsen, Harald Nævdal, Håvard Lund, Heine Totland, Jacob Young, Jørn Skogheim, Karoline Krüger, Kjersti Stubø, Leif Ove Andsnes, Live Maria Roggen, Maria Kannegaard, Øyvor Volle, Simone Eriksrud, Tone Lise Moberg, Tord Gustavsen, and Vidar Busk; death of Karl Andersen.

== 1960s ==
- 1969 in Norwegian music, births of Anneli Drecker, Arvid Solvang, Aslag Guttormsgaard, Bent Sæther, Berit Cardas, Bjørg Lewis, Erlend Skomsvoll, Gulleiv Wee, Håkon Gebhardt, Hans Magnus Ryan, Jan Axel Blomberg, Kim Ofstad, Lars Håvard Haugen, Lene Grenager, Mathilde Grooss Viddal, Olga Konkova, Øyvind Brække, Per Mathisen, Ståle Storløkken, Susanne Lundeng, Svein Olav Herstad, Sven Erik Kristiansen, Thomas Winther Andersen, Trude Eick, and Øyonn Groven Myhren; deaths of Jens Gunderssen, Ludvig Irgens-Jensen, Mary Barratt Due, Paal Flaata, Pauline Hall, and Reidar Bøe.
- 1968 in Norwegian music, births of Arve Henriksen, Bettina Smith, Charlotte Thiis-Evensen, Bjørn Berge, David Gald, Finn Guttormsen, Frank Kvinge, Frode Barth, Geir Luedy Andersen, Jan Bang, Jon Øivind Ness, Jørn Øien, Øystein Aarseth, Paal Flaata, Per Oddvar Johansen, Rune Brøndbo, Sigurd Slåttebrekk, and Stein Torleif Bjella; deaths of Bjarne Amdahl, Inger Bang Lund, Jolly Kramer-Johansen, and Marius Ulfrstad.
- 1967 in Norwegian music, births of Audun Erlien, Audun Skorgen, Børge Petersen-Øverleir, Frode Unneland, Gisle Kverndokk, Håkon Storm-Mathisen, Hans Mathisen, Ivar Kolve, John Hegre, Magnus Grønneberg, Margit Bakken, Petter Wettre, Siri Broch Johansen, Stein Inge Brækhus, and Svein Folkvord; death of Johannes Hanssen.
- 1966 in Norwegian music, births of Erik Honoré, Håvard Gimse, Hildegunn Øiseth, Jarle Vespestad, Kristin Sevaldsen, Kristin von der Goltz, Mai Britt Normann, Nils-Olav Johansen, Øystein Baadsvik, Øystein B. Blix, Ruth Olina Lødemel, Silje Nergaard, Sébastien Dubé, Siri Gellein, Sverre Gjørvad, and Torstein Ellingsen; death of Henrik Adam Due.
- 1965 in Norwegian music, births of Geir Lysne, Helge Andreas Norbakken, Helge Sunde, Kristin Mellem, Liv Stoveland, Malika Makouf Rasmussen, Njål Ølnes, Odd André Elveland, Ole Mathisen, Roger Ludvigsen, and Tone Åse; deaths of Arne Bjørndal and Helge Klæstad.
- 1964 in Norwegian music, births of Arve Furset, Aslak Dørum, Bjarne Brøndbo, Bugge Wesseltoft, Carl Petter Opsahl, Dagfinn Koch, Harald Devold, Helge Lilletvedt, Joachim «Jokke» Nielsen, Johannes Eick, Kåre Kolve, Gottfried von der Goltz, Reidar Skår, Roar Engelberg, Roger Arve Vigulf, Roy Lønhøiden, Terje Isungset, Torbjørn Økland, and Trond Sverre Hansen; deaths of Egil Rasmussen and Sigurd Islandsmoen.
- 1963 in Norwegian music, births of Baard Slagsvold, Benedicte Adrian, Doddo Andersen, Einar Røttingen, Geir Rognø, Henrik Hellstenius, Ingrid Bjørnov, Johan Sara, Kjartan Kristiansen, Ole Amund Gjersvik, Øystein Fevang, Per Arne Glorvigen, Ronni Le Tekrø, Solveig Kringlebotn, Sverre Indris Joner, Tine Asmundsen, and Vigleik Storaas; deaths of Arvid Gram Paulsen and Gunnar Kjeldaas.
- 1962 in Norwegian music, births of Bendik Hofseth, Jon Klette, Kjetil Saunes, Mads Eriksen, Magne Furuholmen, Nils Einar Vinjor, Olaf Kamfjord, Ole Evenrud, Snorre Bjerck, Tor Haugerud, and Torgeir Vassvik; deaths of Alf Andersen, Johan Evje, and Kirsten Flagstad.
- 1961 in Norwegian music, births of Asbjørn Schaathun, Audun Kleive, Eivind Aarset, Glenn Erik Haugland, Harald Dahlstrøm, Karl Seglem, Kenneth Sivertsen, Knut Reiersrud, Knut Vaage, Nils Økland, Paul Waaktaar-Savoy, Paul Wagnberg, Per Øystein Sørensen, Rolf Lislevand, Sinikka Langeland, and Truls Mørk; deaths of Carsten Carlsen and Einar Fagstad.
- 1960 in Norwegian music, births of Arne Berggren, Atle Bakken, Frank Hovland, Ingor Ánte Áilo Gaup, Martin Hagfors, Nils Henrik Asheim, Nils Petter Molvær, Ole Jacob Hystad, Per Bergersen, Rolf Graf, Stig Hvalryg, Terje Gewelt, Tore Brunborg, and Wolfgang Plagge.

== 1950s ==
- 1959 in Norwegian music, births of Bjørn Jenssen, Bjørn Ole Rasch, Diesel Dahl, Eivind Rølles, Elin Rosseland, Frode Alnæs, Frode Fjellheim, Gaute Storaas, Geir Botnen, Hilde Heltberg, Jon Larsen, Jørn Christensen, Kåre Thomsen, Lars Anders Tomter, Mattis Hætta, Morten Harket, Nils Jansen, Nils Mathisen, Odd Magne Gridseth, Ole Hamre, Per Hillestad, Robert Rønnes, and Sigurd Køhn; deaths of Fridtjof Backer-Grøndahl and Ole Windingstad.
- 1958 in Norwegian music, births of Ánde Somby, Anne-Marie Giørtz, Bjarte Engeset, Bjørn Klakegg, Gabriel Fliflet, Henning Kvitnes, Jan Gunnar Hoff, Lage Fosheim, Lakki Patey, Lynni Treekrem, Marius Müller, Øivind Elgenes, Olav Dale, Ragnar Bjerkreim, and Tellef Øgrim; deaths of Arne Svendsen, Johan Backer Lunde, Maja Flagstad, and Ragnar Steen.
- 1957 in Norwegian music, births of Anne Grete Preus, Christian Eggen, Ernst-Wiggo Sandbakk, Fredrik Carl Størmer, Hege Schøyen, Inger Marie Gundersen, Jørn Hoel, Morten Halle, Njål Vindenes, Oddmund Finnseth, Øystein Sevåg, Rolf Wallin, Runar Tafjord, Terje Mikkelsen, and Yngve Moe; deaths of Christian Leden and Edvard Bræin.
- 1956 in Norwegian music, births of Eivind Aadland, Eivin One Pedersen, Geir Holmsen, Geir Langslet, Hilde Hefte, Jens Wendelboe, Kari Bremnes, Kate Augestad, Lars Martin Myhre, Maj Britt Andersen, Mari Boine, Marit Sandvik, Mikhail Alperin, Morgan Lindstrøm, Ragnhild Berstad, Rob Waring, Stephan Barratt-Due, and Svein Dag Hauge; deaths of Harald Heide and Hildur Andersen.
- 1955 in Norwegian music, births of Jan Kåre Hystad, Jon Balke, Kjetil Bjerkestrand, Morten Gunnar Larsen, Ole Henrik Giørtz, Pål Thowsen, Rolf Løvland, Rune Klakegg, Terje Tønnesen, and Yngve Slettholm; death of Arne Eggen.
- 1954 in Norwegian music, births of Bertil Palmar Johansen, Bjørn Eidsvåg, Bodil Niska, Cecilie Ore, Edvard Askeland, Frank Jakobsen, Gunnar Andreas Berg, Haakon Graf, Håkon Berge, Hans Fredrik Jacobsen, Helge Iberg, Kåre Garnes, Kåre Nordstoga, Knut Værnes, Kristin Solli Schøien, Lars Kristian Brynildsen, Øystein Norvoll, Paolo Vinaccia, Svein Olav Blindheim, and Torbjørn Sunde; deaths of Hanna Marie Hansen and Per Reidarson.
- 1953 in Norwegian music, births of Erik Balke, Erling Aksdal, Geir Johnson, Jon Eberson, Lasse Myrvold, Odd Riisnæs, Per Hannevold, Per Kolstad, Sigurd Ulveseth, Ståle Wikshåland, Stein-Erik Olsen, Stein Erik Tafjord, Tom Olstad, and Vidar Johansen; death of Issay Dobrowen.
- 1952 in Norwegian music, births of Bent Patey, Carl Haakon Waadeland, Finn Sletten, Halvor Haug, Henning Sommerro, Jon Laukvik, Ketil Bjørnstad, Kjell Samkopf, Magnar Åm, Ole Thomsen, Øyvind Rauset, Per Jørgensen, Radka Toneff, Sidsel Endresen, Soon-Mi Chung, and Trond-Viggo Torgersen; deaths of Alfred Andersen-Wingar and Fartein Valen.
- 1951 in Norwegian music, births of Bodvar Moe, Brynjulf Blix, Ellen Nikolaysen, Erik Hillestad, Geir Bøhren, Gerd Gudding, Jan Eggum, Ragnar Sør Olsen, Terje Nilsen, and Tove Karoline Knutsen; deaths of Gunnar Gjerstrøm and Halfdan Cleve.
- 1950 in Norwegian music, births of Åse Hedstrøm, Bent Åserud, Bjørn Kjellemyr, Dag Arnesen, Gro Anita Schønn, Guttorm Guttormsen, Halvdan Sivertsen, John Pål Inderberg, Kari Svendsen, Lillebjørn Nilsen, Ragnar Olsen, Sveinung Hovensjø, Synne Skouen, Trond Granlund, and Trygve Thue; deaths of Cally Monrad, Signe Lund, Vilhelm Dybwad, and William Farre.

== 1940s ==
- 1949 in Norwegian music, births of Åge Aleksandersen, Åse Kleveland, Harald Halvorsen, Inger Lise Rypdal, Iver Kleive, Knut Borge, Lars Klevstrand, Lasse Thoresen, Olav Berg, Per Husby, Philip Kruse, and Torgeir Rebolledo Pedersen.
- 1948 in Norwegian music, births of Carl Morten Iversen, Espen Rud, Frode Gjerstad, Håkon Austbø, Hans Rotmo, Henning Gravrok, Jens Harald Bratlie, Kåre Jostein Simonsen, Knut Buen, Konrad Kaspersen, and Steinar Ofsdal.
- 1947 in Norwegian music, births of Aage Kvalbein, Finn Kalvik, Fred Nøddelund, Grethe Kausland, Jan Garbarek, Jan Arvid Johansen, Ketil Haugsand, Kjell Mørk Karlsen, Ole Paus, Øystein Dolmen, Øystein Sunde, Ruth Bakke, Terje Rypdal, Terje Venaas, Torhild Staahlen, and Wenche Myhre; deaths of Per Kvist and Per Steenberg.
- 1946 in Norwegian music, births of Agnes Buen Garnås, Bjørn Kruse, Georg Kajanus, Harald Sæther, Helge Jordal, Ivar Antonsen, Kirsti Sparboe, Knut Kristiansen, Knut Lystad, Olav Anton Thommessen, Ole A. Sørli, Sigmund Groven, and Sverre Kjelsberg; death of Olav Gunnarsson Helland.
- 1945 in Norwegian music, births of Arild Andersen, Bjørn Alterhaug, Bjørn Moe, Bjørnar Andresen, Halvard Kausland, Inga Juuso, Knut Riisnæs, Magni Wentzel, Ragnar Søderlind, Svein Finnerud, Terje Bjørklund, and Trond Kverno; deaths of Edvard Sylou-Creutz and Johan Austbø.
- 1944 in Norwegian music, births of Carl Magnus Neumann, Erling Wicklund, Jan Erik Kongshaug, Jiri Hlinka, Oddbjørn Blindheim, Roy Hellvin, and Yngvar Numme; death of Sandra Droucker.
- 1943 in Norwegian music, births of Anne-Lise Berntsen, Bjørn Boysen, Bjørn Krokfoss, Bjøro Håland, Jon Christensen, Julie Ege, Knut "Sputnik" Storbukås, and Thorgeir Stubø; death of Anders Hovden.
- 1942 in Norwegian music, births of Arne J. Solhaug, Ditlef Eckhoff, Gro Sandvik, Jan Fredrik Christiansen, Jon Mostad, Terje Fjærn, and Torgrim Sollid; deaths of Alfred Evensen and Catharinus Elling.
- 1941 in Norwegian music, births of Frøydis Ree Wekre, John Persen, and Svein Christiansen; deaths of Christian Sinding, Gottfred Pedersen, Harald Lie, Iver Holter, and Sigwardt Aspestrand.
- 1940 in Norwegian music, births of Bjørn Johansen, Egil Kapstad, Frode Thingnæs, Jack Berntsen, Laila Dalseth, Ole Jacob Hansen, and Trygve Madsen; death of Ivar F. Andresen.

== 1930s ==
- 1939 in Norwegian music, births of Bjarne Fiskum, Harald Heide-Steen Jr., Jan Erik Vold, Kari Løvaas, Ketil Hvoslef, Ove Stokstad, Petter Pettersson, and Odd Børre; death of Gustav Fredrik Lange.
- 1938 in Norwegian music, births of Alf Kjellman, Ivar Medaas, and Kjell Bartholdsen; deaths of Anna Severine Lindeman, Borghild Holmsen, Ole Hjellemo, and Trygve Henrik Hoff.
- 1937 in Norwegian music, births of Alfred Janson, Arild Nyquist, Bjørn Lie-Hansen, Erik Amundsen, Eyvind Solås, Karin Krog, and Per Øien; death of Fridthjov Anderssen.
- 1936 in Norwegian music, births of Alf Cranner, Arve Tellefsen, Helge Hurum, Kåre Kolberg, and Rolv Wesenlund; deaths of Alfred Paulsen, Jakob Hveding Sletten Paul Knutsen Barstad Sandvik, and Rolv Wesenlund,.
- 1935 in Norwegian music, births of Birgitte Grimstad, Tore Jensen, and Totti Bergh; deaths of Caroline Schytte Jensen, Emil Biorn, Johan Halvorsen, Knut Glomsaas, Nina Grieg, and Per Winge.
- 1934 in Norwegian music, births of Egil Johansen and Kåre Grøttum; death of Mon Schjelderup.
- 1933 in Norwegian music, births of Asmund Bjørken and Jan Henrik Kayser; deaths of Alf Fasmer Dahl and Gerhard Schjelderup.
- 1932 in Norwegian music, births of Atle Hammer, Ketil Vea, Knut Albrigt Andersen, Sigurd Jansen, Sven Nyhus, and Tor Brevik; deaths of Eyvind Alnæs and Gabriel Tischendorf.
- 1931 in Norwegian music, births of Arne Nordheim, Bjørg Lødøen, Kaare Ørnung, and Kjell Karlsen; deaths of Margrethe Munthe and Otto Winter-Hjelm.
- 1930 in Norwegian music, births of Einar Iversen, Elisabeth Granneman, Jan Elgarøy, Kjell Bækkelund, Mikkel Flagstad, and Tone Groven Holmboe; deaths of Hannah Løvenskiold, Michael Flagstad, Oscar Borg, and Peter Brynie Lindeman.

== 1920s ==
- 1929 in Norwegian music, births of Finn Benestad, Sigurd Berge, Simon Flem Devold, and Sølvi Wang; death of Arvid Kleven.
- 1928 in Norwegian music, births of Alf Andersen, Egil Monn-Iversen, and Per Asplin; deaths of Sjur Helgeland and Torgrim Castberg.
- 1927 in Norwegian music, births of Alfred Næss, Eva Knardahl, Ingrid Bjoner, Kjell Lund, and Øistein "Tinka" Ringstad; death of Ole Olsen.
- 1926 in Norwegian music, births of Arne Bendiksen, Dag Schjelderup-Ebbe, Erik Bye, Kristian Bergheim, Odd Børretzen, and Randi Hultin; death of Anton Jörgen Andersen.
- 1925 in Norwegian music, birth of Hans-Jørgen Holman, Ingebrigt Davik, and Kurt Foss; deaths of Hjalmar Borgstrøm and Johannes Haarklou.
- 1924 in Norwegian music, births of Edvard Fliflet Bræin and Egil Hovland.
- 1923 in Norwegian music, births of Bjarne Nerem, Carsten Klouman, Erling Stordahl, Fredrik Friis, Nora Brockstedt, Paul Weeden, and Sverre Bruland; death of Olaus Andreas Grøndahl.
- 1922 in Norwegian music, births of Antonio Bibalo, Arvid Gram Paulsen, Edvard Hagerup Bull, Finn Mortensen, and Hanna-Marie Weydahl; deaths of Theodora Cormontan, and Thorvald Lammers.
- 1921 in Norwegian music, births of Arne Dørumsgaard, Reidar Bøe, Søren Gangfløt, and Willy Andresen; deaths of Christian Haslerud and Knut Dahle.
- 1920 in Norwegian music, births of Jonas Brunvoll, Jr., Karsten Andersen, Ole Henrik Moe, Rolf Andersen and Rowland Greenberg.

== 1910s ==
- 1919 in Norwegian music, births of Bjørn Fongaard, Fred Lange-Nielsen, Johan Kvandal, Øistein Sommerfeldt, Per Hjort Albertsen and Stephan Henrik Barratt-Due.
- 1918 in Norwegian music, births of Berit Brænne, Finn Ludt, Torstein Grythe, and Vidar Sandbeck; deaths of Anders Heyerdahl and Frants Beyer.
- 1917 in Norwegian music, births of Eva Gustavson, Eva Prytz, Hans W. Brimi, Maj Sønstevold, and Ragnar Danielsen.
- 1916 in Norwegian music, births of Arnljot Kjeldaas, Greta Gynt, Hallvard Johnsen, Ørnulf Gulbransen, and Robert Normann; death of Christian Cappelen.
- 1915 in Norwegian music, birth of Aage Samuelsen, Arvid Fladmoe, Finn Arnestad, Henki Kolstad, Knut Nystedt, and Sverre Bergh.
- 1914 in Norwegian music, births of Kari Diesen, Magne Elvestrand, and Leif Solberg.
- 1913 in Norwegian music, deaths of Amalie Christie, Beate Asserson, and Eline Nygaard Riisnæs; death of Theodor Løvstad.
- 1912 in Norwegian music, births of Gunnar Sønstevold, Jens Gunderssen, Robert Levin, Svein Øvergaard, and Thorbjørn Egner; death of Ola Mosafinn.
- 1911 in Norwegian music, births of Anne-Marie Ørbeck, Arne Hendriksen, Cissi Cleve, Egil Storbekken, and Gottfred Pedersen; death of Johan Svendsen.
- 1910 in Norwegian music, births of Christian Hartmann, Jens Book-Jenssen, Leif Juster, and Sigbjørn Bernhoft Osa; death of Johan Selmer.

== 1900s ==
- 1909 in Norwegian music, births of Jan Wølner, Øivind Bergh, and Peter L. Rypdal; death of Christian Teilman.
- 1908 in Norwegian music, births of Conrad Baden, Geirr Tveitt, and Paul Okkenhaug.
- 1907 in Norwegian music, deaths of Adolf Østbye, Agathe Backer Grøndahl, and Edvard Grieg.
- 1906 in Norwegian music, births of Klaus Egge and Ludvig Nielsen.
- 1905 in Norwegian music, births of Elling Enger and Kristian Hauger.
- 1904 in Norwegian music, births of Ernst Glaser, Ragnar Steen, and Torbjørn Knutsen; death of Sigurd Lie.
- 1903 in Norwegian music, births of Bjarne Amdahl, Carl Gustav Sparre Olsen, Egil Rasmussen, Karl Andersen, Leif Rustad, and Øivin Fjeldstad; deaths of Adolf Thomsen and Erika Nissen.
- 1902 in Norwegian music, birth of Bias Bernhoft, Harald Lie, Jolly Kramer-Johansen; deaths of Elias Blix, Franz Josef Weern and Lars Fykerud.
- 1901 in Norwegian music, births of Aslak Brekke, Eivind Groven, Erling Kjellsby, Kari Aarvold Glaser, and Olav Kielland.
- 1900 in Norwegian music, death of Augusta Schrumpf.

== 1890s ==
- 1899 in Norwegian music, births of Arvid Kleven, Einar Fagstad, Odd Grüner-Hegge, and Signe Amundsen.
- 1898 in Norwegian music, births of Eyvind Hesselberg, Ola Isene, Reimar Riefling, and Rolf Gammleng.
- 1897 in Norwegian music, birth of Harald Sæverud.
- 1896 in Norwegian music, birth of Hans Stenseth; deaths of Emma Dahl and Johan Gottfried Conradi.
- 1895 in Norwegian music, births of Arild Sandvold, Bjarne Brustad, Kirsten Flagstad, and Soffi Schønning.
- 1894 in Norwegian music, birth of Ludvig Irgens-Jensen; death of Sophie Dedekam.
- 1893 in Norwegian music, births of Finn Bø and Olav Gurvin.
- 1892 in Norwegian music, birth of Carsten Carlsen.
- 1891 in Norwegian music, births of Gunnar Gjerstrøm, Henrik Adam Due and Issay Dobrowen.
- 1890 in Norwegian music, births of Bjørn Talén, Gunnar Kjeldaas, Johan Didrik Behrens, Marius Ulfrstad, Pauline Hall, and Per Kvist.

== 1880s ==
- 1889 in Norwegian music, birth of Sverre Jordan; death of Martin Andreas Udbye.
- 1888 in Norwegian music, birth of David Monrad Johansen; death of Edmund Neupert.
- 1887 in Norwegian music, births of Edvard Bræin and Fartein Valen; death of Alette Due and Ludvig Mathias Lindeman.
- 1886 in Norwegian music, birth of Ole Windingstad.
- 1885 in Norwegian music, births of Fridtjof Backer-Grøndahl, Helge Klæstad, and Trygve Torjussen.
- 1884 in Norwegian music, birth of Arne Svendsen.
- 1883 in Norwegian music, birth of Alfred Evensen; deaths of Friedrich August Reissiger and Per Lasson.
- 1882 in Norwegian music, births of Alf Hurum, Arne Bjørndal, and Christian Leden.
- 1881 in Norwegian music, birth of Arne Eggen, Edvard Sylou-Creutz, and Sigurd Islandsmoen.
- 1880 in Norwegian music, birth of Sigvart Høgh-Nilsen; deaths of Magnus Brostrup Landstad and Ole Bull.

== Pre-1880s ==
- 1879 in Norwegian music, births of Cally Monrad, Halfdan Cleve, Johan Austbø, and Per Reidarson; death of Hanna Bergwitz-Goffeng.
- 1878 in Norwegian music
- 1877 in Norwegian music, death of Ferdinand Giovanny Schediwy.
- 1876 in Norwegian music, births of Fridthjov Anderssen, Harald Heide, and Inger Bang Lund.
- 1875 in Norwegian music, births of Hanna Marie Hansen and Olav Gunnarsson Helland.
- 1874 in Norwegian music, births of Alf Fasmer Dahl, Johan Evje, Johan Backer Lunde, Johannes Hanssen, Thomas Tellefsen, Torgrim Castberg, and William Farre.
- 1873 in Norwegian music, births of Ole Hjellemo; deaths of Carl Arnold and Håvard Gibøen.
- 1872 in Norwegian music, births of Eyvind Alnæs, Jakob Hveding Sletten, and Targjei "Myllarguten" Augundsson.
- 1871 in Norwegian music, births of Maja Flagstad and Sigurd Lie.
- 1870 in Norwegian music, births of Mon Schjelderup and Per Steenberg; death of Herman Severin Løvenskiold.
- 1869 in Norwegian music, births of Alfred Andersen-Wingar and Michael Flagstad.
- 1868 in Norwegian music, births of Adolf Østbye and Signe Lund; death of Halfdan Kjerulf.

...

- 1866 in Norwegian music, death of Rikard Nordraak.
- 1865 in Norwegian music, birth of Borghild Holmsen.
- 1864 in Norwegian music, births of Emil Biorn, Hjalmar Borgstrøm, and Johan Halvorsen.
- 1863 in Norwegian music, births of Knut Glomsaas and Vilhelm Dybwad.
- 1862 in Norwegian music, death of Jacobine Gjertz.
- 1861 in Norwegian music, birth of Gustav Fredrik Lange; deaths of Christian Blom and Fredrikke Egeberg.
- 1860 in Norwegian music, births of Anders Hovden, Hannah Løvenskiold, Lars Fykerud, and Margrethe Munthe.
- 1859 in Norwegian music, births of Anna Severine Lindeman, Berte Canutte Aarflot, Gerhard Schjelderup, and Per Lasson.
- 1858 in Norwegian music, births of Catharinus Elling, Per Winge, Peter Brynie Lindeman and Sjur Helgeland.
- 1857 in Norwegian music, death of Ole Andreas Lindeman.
- 1856 in Norwegian music, births of Christian Sinding and Sigwardt Aspestrand.

...

- 1852 in Norwegian music, birth of Adolf Thomsen.
- 1851 in Norwegian music, births of Frants Beyer and Oscar Borg.
- 1850 in Norwegian music, births of Iver Holter and Ole Olsen; death of Lars Roverud..
- 1849 in Norwegian music, birth of Alfred Paulsen.
- 1848 in Norwegian music, birth of Caroline Schytte Jensen.
- 1847 in Norwegian music, births of Agathe Backer Grøndahl, Johannes Haarklou, Olaus Andreas Grøndahl, and Paul Knutsen Barstad Sandvik.
- 1846 in Norwegian music, death of Lars Møller Ibsen.
- 1845 in Norwegian music, births of Christian Cappelen, Erika Nissen, and Nina Grieg.
- 1844 in Norwegian music, birth of Johan Selmer.
- 1843 in Norwegian music, birth of Christian Teilman, Edvard Grieg and Theodor Løvstad.
- 1842 in Norwegian music, births of Edmund Neupert, Gabriel Tischendorf, and Rikard Nordraak.
- 1841 in Norwegian music, birth of Thorvald Lammers.
- 1840 in Norwegian music, birth of Johan Svendsen.
- 1839 in Norwegian music, death of Hans Skramstad.

...

- 1837 in Norwegian music, birth of Otto Winter-Hjelm.
- 1836 in Norwegian music, birth of Elias Blix; death of Israel Gottlieb Wernicke.

...

- 1834 in Norwegian music, births of Christian Haslerud and Knut Dahle.

...

- 1832 in Norwegian music, birth of Anders Heyerdahl.

...

- 1830 in Norwegian music, death of Hans Hagerup Falbe

...

- 1828 in Norwegian music, death of Ola Mosafinn and Waldemar Thrane.
- 1827 in Norwegian music, death of Mons Lie.

...

- 1823 in Norwegian music, birth of Thomas Tellefsen.
- 1821 in Norwegian music, birth of Hanna Bergwitz-Goffeng.
- 1820 in Norwegian music, births of Johan Didrik Behrens, Johan Gottfried Conradi, Martin Andreas Udbye and Sophie Dedekam.
- 1819 in Norwegian music, births of Jacobine Gjertz and Emma Dahl.

...

- 1815 in Norwegian music, births of Fredrikke Egeberg, Halfdan Kjerulf and Herman Severin Løvenskiold.

...

- 1813 in Norwegian music, birth of Augusta Schrumpf.
- 1812 in Norwegian music, births of Franz Josef Weern and Ludvig Mathias Lindeman.

...

- 1810 in Norwegian music, birth of Ole Bull.
- 1809 in Norwegian music, birth of Friedrich August Reissiger and Håvard Gibøen.

...

- 1807 in Norwegian music, death of Johan Henrich Berlin.

...

- 1804 in Norwegian music, birth of Ferdinand Giovanny Schediwy.

...

- 1802 in Norwegian music, birth of Magnus Brostrup Landstad.
- 1801 in Norwegian music, birth of Targjei "Myllarguten" Augundsson.
