= 1935 in Norwegian music =

The following is a list of notable events and releases of the year 1935 in Norwegian music.

== Deaths ==
September

- 7 – Per Winge, conductor, pianist and composer (born 1858).
- 24 – Caroline Schytte Jensen, writer and composer (born 1848).

December

- 4 – Johan Halvorsen, composer, conductor and violinist (born 1864).
- 9 – Nina Grieg, lyric soprano and singing teacher (born 1845).

Unknown date

- Emil Biorn, sculptor, painter and composer (born 1864).
- Knut Glomsaas, military musician (born 1863).

== Births ==
May

- 19 – Tore Jensen, jazz trumpeter and bandleader.

December

- 5 – Totti Bergh, jazz saxophonist (died 2012).
- 15 – Birgitte Grimstad, singer, guitarist, composer and writer.

== See also ==
- 1935 in Norway
- Music of Norway
