= 1933 in Norwegian music =

The following is a list of notable events and releases of the year 1933 in Norwegian music.

== Events ==
July

- 1 – The Norwegian Broadcasting Corporation (NRK) was founded.

== Deaths ==
June

- 21 – Alf Fasmer Dahl, priest and composer (born 1874).

July

- 29 – Gerhard Schjelderup, composer, known especially for his operas (born 1859).

== Births ==
February

- 20 – Jan Henrik Kayser, classical pianist (died 2016).

May

- 22 – Eivind Solberg, Norwegian trumpeter (died 2008).
- 25 – Almar Heggen, opera singer (died 2014).

August

- 19 – Asmund Bjørken, jazz and traditional folk accordionist and saxophonist (died 2018).

== See also ==
- 1933 in Norway
- Music of Norway
