= 1918 in Norwegian music =

The following is a list of notable events and releases of the year 1918 in Norwegian music.

== Deaths ==
November

- 10 – Frants Beyer, average adjuster, tax inspector and composer (born 1851).

December

- 3 – Anders Heyerdahl, violinist, composer and folk music collector (born 1832).

== Births ==
July

- 21 – Vidar Sandbeck, folk singer, composer, and writer (died 2005).

September

- 17 – Berit Brænne, actress, children's writer and songwriter (died 1976).

November

- 16 – Finn Ludt, pianist, composer and music critic (died 1992).
- 24 – Torstein Grythe, choir leader (died 2009).

== See also ==
- 1918 in Norway
- Music of Norway
