= Kjellsby =

Kjellsby is a Norwegian surname. Notable people with the surname include:

- Erling Kjellsby (1901–1976), Norwegian organist and composer
- Jorunn Kjellsby (1944–2025), Norwegian actress
