= 1938 in Norwegian music =

The following is a list of notable events and releases of the year 1938 in Norwegian music.

== Events ==
- The Stavanger Symphony Orchestra was founded by NRK under the name 'Stavanger musikerforenings orkester'.

== Deaths ==
June

- 24 – Anna Severine Lindeman, composer and music teacher (born 1859).

September

- 18 – Ole Hjellemo, violinist and composer (born 1876).

December

- 4 – Borghild Holmsen, pianist, music critic and composer (born 1865).

== Births ==
January

- 17 – Alf Kjellman, jazz saxophonist (died 2010).

April

- 9 – Ivar Medaas, folk singer (died 2005).

July

- 7 – Trygve Henrik Hoff, singer, composer, songwriter, and writer (died 1987).

October

- 2 – Kjell Bartholdsen, jazz saxophonist (died 2009).

== See also ==
- 1938 in Norway
- Music of Norway
