= 1899 in Norwegian music =

The following is a list of notable events and releases of the year 1899 in Norwegian music.

== Births ==
June

- 9 – Signe Amundsen, operatic soprano (died 1987).

September

- 23 – Odd Grüner-Hegge, orchestra conductor (died 1973).

October

- 30 – Einar Fagstad, accordionist, singer, actor and composer (died 1961).

November

- 29 – Arvid Kleven, composer and flautist (died 1929).

== See also ==
- 1899 in Norway
- Music of Norway
