= 1909 in Norwegian music =

The following is a list of notable events and releases of the year 1909 in Norwegian music.

== Deaths ==
December

- 4 – Christian Teilman (66), organist, pianist, and composer.

== Births ==
February

- 10 – Peter L. Rypdal, fiddler and traditional folk music composer (died 1988).

October

- 18 – Jan Wølner, classical pianist (died 1991).

December

- 3 – Øivind Bergh, violinist and orchestral leader (died 1987).

== See also ==
- 1909 in Norway
- Music of Norway
