= 1913 in Norwegian music =

The following is a list of notable events and releases of the year 1913 in Norwegian music.

== Deaths ==
April

- 20 – Theodor Løvstad, musician, magazine editor and revue writer (born 1843).

== Births ==
March

- 9 – Beate Asserson, mezzo-soprano opera singer (died 2000).

July

- 5 – Eline Nygaard Riisnæs, pianist and musicologist (died 2011).

December

- 21 – Amalie Christie, pianist (died 2010).

== See also ==
- 1913 in Norway
- Music of Norway
