= Fridtjof Backer-Grøndahl =

Norwegian musician (1885–1959)

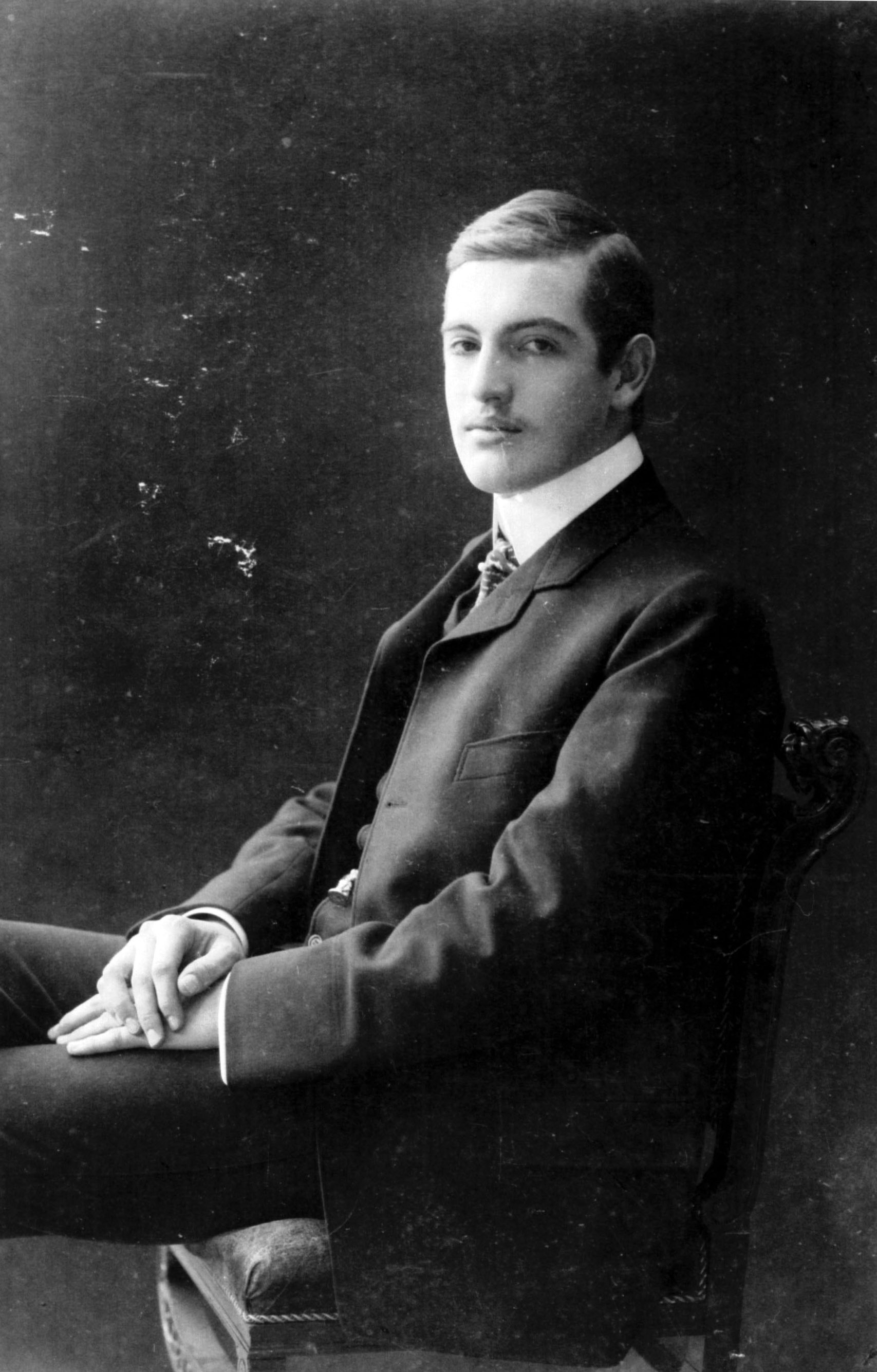
Fridtjof Backer-Grøndahl in 1905.

Fridtjof Backer-Grøndahl (15 October 1885 – 21 June 1959) was a Norwegian pianist, composer and music teacher.

== Biography ==
Backer-Grøndahl was born in Christiania (later Oslo) in 1885, the son of the conductor and singing teacher Olaus Andreas Grøndahl and the pianist and composer Agathe Backer Grøndahl. His first studies were with his mother, under whom he made his concert debut at the age of 18. He then went to the Berlin High School for Music where his teacher was Ernst Rudorff. He also had private lessons with Ernst von Dohnányi and Xaver Scharwenka.

He made a special study of the Piano Concerto in A minor by his countryman (and his mother's friend) Edvard Grieg. He toured in Germany and neighbouring countries from 1905. In 1906 (Amsterdam) and 1907 (Kiel) he played Grieg's Concerto under the baton of the composer. He also played the concerto under Johan Svendsen.

From 1920 to 1930 Fridtjof Backer-Grøndahl lived in Britain, where he taught at University College London and also concertized, including works by his mother, Grieg, and other Norwegian music in his repertoire, along with those of Beethoven, Chopin, Schumann and Brahms.

He wrote some piano pieces and song cycles. He made a small number of recordings of Grieg's Lyric Pieces, available on YouTube. Also he made recordings of his mother Agathe Backer Grøndahl's piano pieces (2 X 10inch 4ss).

Fridtjof Backer-Grøndahl died in Oslo in 1959, aged 73.
