= 1932 in Norwegian music =

The following is a list of notable events and releases of the year 1932 in Norwegian music.

== Deaths ==
September

- 24 – Gabriel Tischendorf, organist and composer (born 1842).

December

- 24 – Eyvind Alnæs, composer, known especially for his operas (born 1872).

== Births ==
January

- 22 – Tor Brevik, composer (died 2018).

February

- 5 – Ketil Vea, composer and music teacher (died 2015).

March

- 4 – Sigurd Jansen, composer, pianist, and orchestra conductor.
- 11 – Atle Hammer, Norwegian trumpeter (died 2017).

May

- 21 – Sven Nyhus, traditional folk musician, fiddler, composer and musicologist (died 2023).

August

- 5 – Børt-Erik Thoresen, television host and folk singer (died 2011).

September

- 4 – Per Müller, musician and singer (died 2016).

October

== See also ==
- 1932 in Norway
- Music of Norway
