= 1883 in Norwegian music =

The following is a list of notable events and releases of the year 1883 in Norwegian music.

== Deaths ==
March

- 2 – Friedrich August Reissiger, composer (born 1809)

June

- 6 – Per Lasson, composer (born 1859)

== Births ==
August

- 17 – Alfred Evensen, composer (died 1942).

== See also ==
- 1883 in Norway
- Music of Norway
