= 1901 in Norwegian music =

The following is a list of notable events and releases of the year 1901 in Norwegian music.

== Births ==
January

- 4 – Kari Aarvold Glaser, pianist and music teacher (died 1972).

August

- 16 – Olav Kielland, composer and conductor (died 1985).

July

- 7 – Erling Kjellsby, organist and composer (died 1976).

October

- 6 – Aslak Brekke, traditional folk singer (died 1978).
- 8 – Eivind Groven, microtonal composer and music-theorist (died 1977).

== See also ==
- 1901 in Norway
- Music of Norway
