= Sverre Bruland =

Norwegian trumpeter and conductor

Sverre Tonning Olsen Bruland (2 February 1923, Stavanger – 24 September 2013) was a Norwegian trumpet player and conductor.

== Biography ==
He was born in Stavanger.

He studied with Per Steenberg, Karl Andersen, Odd Grüner-Hegge, Igor Markevitch, and Paul van Kempen, at the Juilliard School in New York between 1949 and 1950, and at the Mozarteum in Salzburg, Austria.

He was hired as a trumpeter by the so-called Second Division Ensemble in Oslo, where he played between 1945 and 1946, and by the Oslo Philharmonic Orchestra in 1946, where he played between 1946 and 1966. He made his debut as an orchestra conductor with the Oslo Philharmonic Orchestra in 1954.

In 1966 he was hired as kapellmeister by the Norwegian Radio Orchestra. From 1976 to 1988 he was chief conductor of Norwegian Broadcasting Orchestra.

Bruland won the 1st prize in the international conducting competition in Liverpool in 1958, and the conducting prize in Tanglewood, USA (Boston Symphony Orchestra's summer music school, Berkshire Musical Centre) in 1959.

Bruland conducted the Berlin Philharmonic Orchestra on two public occasions with Norwegian music on the program.

He died on 24 September 2013, after a short illness.
