= 1929 in Norwegian music =

The following is a list of notable events and releases of the year 1929 in Norwegian music.

== Deaths ==
November

- 23 – Arvid Kleven, composer and flautist (born 1899).

== Births ==
July

- 1 – Sigurd Berge, composer (died 2002).

March

- 17 – Simon Flem Devold, clarinetist and columnist (died 2015).

August

- 28 – Sølvi Wang, singer and actress (died 2011).

October

- 30 – Finn Benestad, musicologist (died 2012)

== See also ==
- 1929 in Norway
- Music of Norway
