= Gudbrand Bøhn =

Norwegian musician

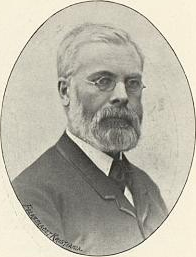
- Born: November 10, 1839; Nes, Norway
- Died: January 18, 1906 (aged 66); Oslo, Norway
- Occupation: Violinist

Gudbrand Bøhn (November 10, 1839 – January 18, 1906) was a Norwegian violinist, concertmaster, and music teacher.

Bøhn was born in Nes in Akershus county, Norway. He was the son of the violinist Ole Gulbrandsen Bøhn (1803–1882).

He was a central figure in the capital city's artistic community, where he started holding regular chamber music evenings, and he was the concertmaster at the Christiania Theater until 1899, when it closed. Bøhn premiered Edvard Grieg's Violin Sonata No. 1 in F major, Op. 8 in 1867 with the composer at the piano. His students included Christian Sinding, Sigurd Lie, Michael Flagstad, Harald Heide, William Farre, and Johan Halvorsen.

Bøhn died in Kristiania (now Oslo).
