= 1907 in Norwegian music =

The following is a list of notable events and releases of the year 1907 in Norwegian music.

== Deaths ==
September

- 4 – Edvard Grieg (64), composer and pianist.
- 5 – Adolf Østbye (39), revue artist, barber, and the first Norwegian recording artist.

December

- 1 – Agathe Backer Grøndahl (59), pianist and composer.

== See also ==
- 1907 in Norway
- Music of Norway
