= Lars Fykerud =

Norwegian fiddler and composer

- Born: 5 April 1860; Saude Municipality, Norway
- Died: 19 August 1902 (aged 42)
- Occupations: fiddler and composer

Lars Hansson Fykerud (5 April 1860 – 19 August 1902) was a Norwegian Hardanger fiddler and composer. He was born in Saude Municipality; the son of folk musician Hans G. Fykerud and Torbjørg Larsdotter. Fykerud played the fiddle in the tradition of Knut Luraas, Håvard Gibøen and Myllarguten, and composed new tunes based on traditional folk music. A memorial of him is raised at Bø Church in Telemark, and he was biographed by H. Braaten in 1939.
