= Karl Andersen =

Norwegian cellist

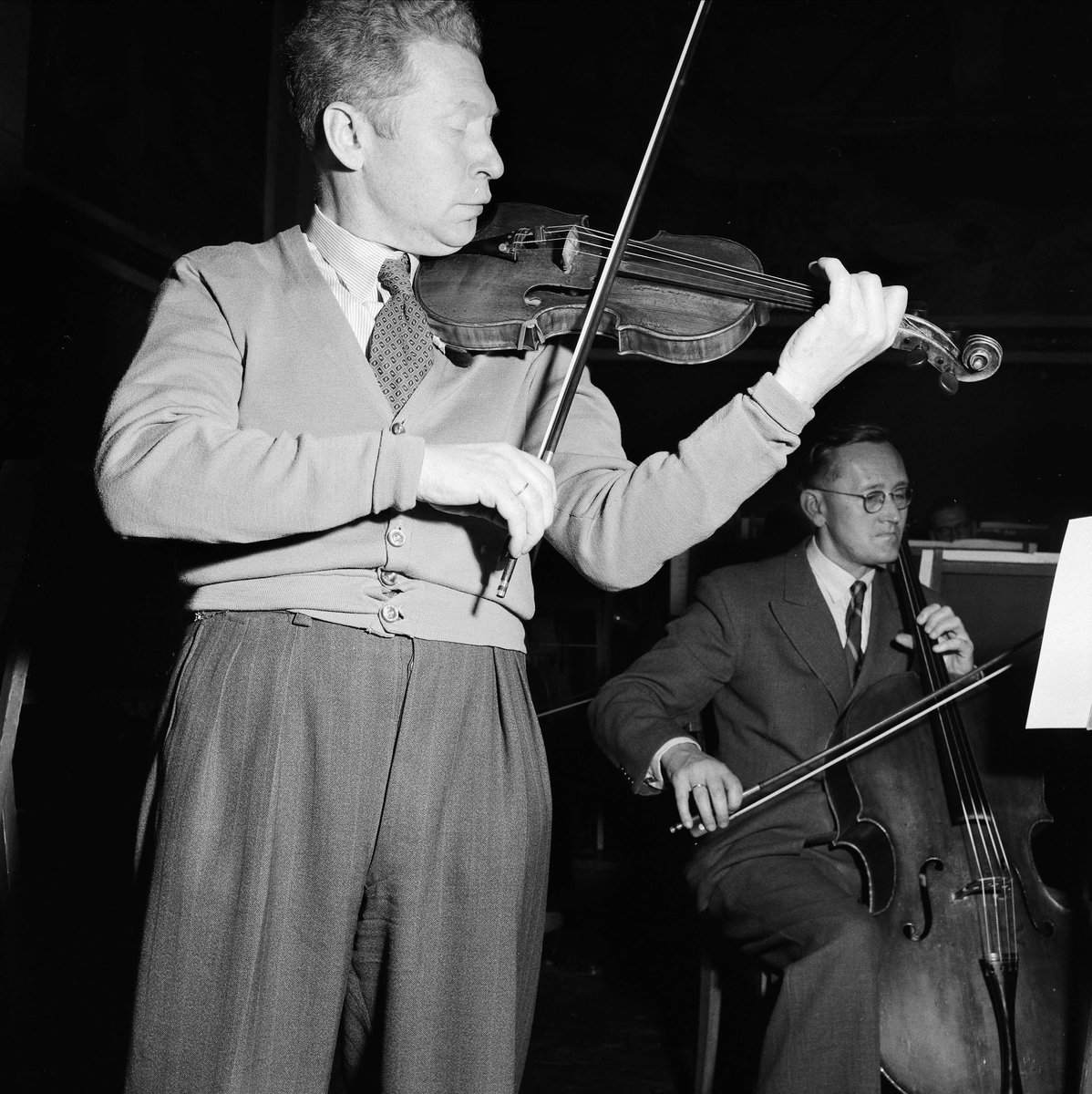
Karl Andersen performing cello together with, among others, the violinist Ernst Glaser in a rehearsal with the Oslo Philharmonic Orchestra in Universitetets Aula, 1953. Photo: Leif Ørnelund

Karl August Andersen (29 September 1903 in Oslo – 15 August 1970 in Oslo) was a Norwegian cellist from Vaterland, in his time the leading Norwegian cellist and solo cellist in Oslo Philharmonic for many decades.

== Biography ==
At the age of 17 Andersen debuted in the Universitetets Aula (1920). He appeared regularly with the broadcasting organization Norwegian Broadcasting's studios, often in duet with violinist Ernst Glaser and the Filharmonisk Selskaps string quartet, where he bore the nickname «Kalle cello». He also mace quite a few compositions in neoklassisk style, like his trio for cello, clarinet and flute (played by Alf Andersen (1928-1962) and Richard Kjelstrup), his contribution in the competition to the opening of Oslo rådhus, and Harlequin in twelve-tone technique for piano (1957). In 1952 he received the first prize from the Norwegian Society of Composers annual award.

As music theory teacher, he taught Ørnulf Gulbransen, Leif Solberg, Kai Angel Næsteby, Kåre Fuglesang, Arne Novang and Stephan Barratt-Due, among others. The Philharmonic cello group was in the 1940s, '50s and '60s comprising six musicians, Andersen and Arne Melsom on the 1st desk, Sverre Krøvel and Hans Balchen on the 2nd desk, Arne Novang and Levi Hindar on the 3rd desk. Andersen was a frimurer and musical consultant for Norwegian Broadcasting Corporation from 1962.
