= Egil Storbekken =

Norwegian folk musician, composer and instrument maker

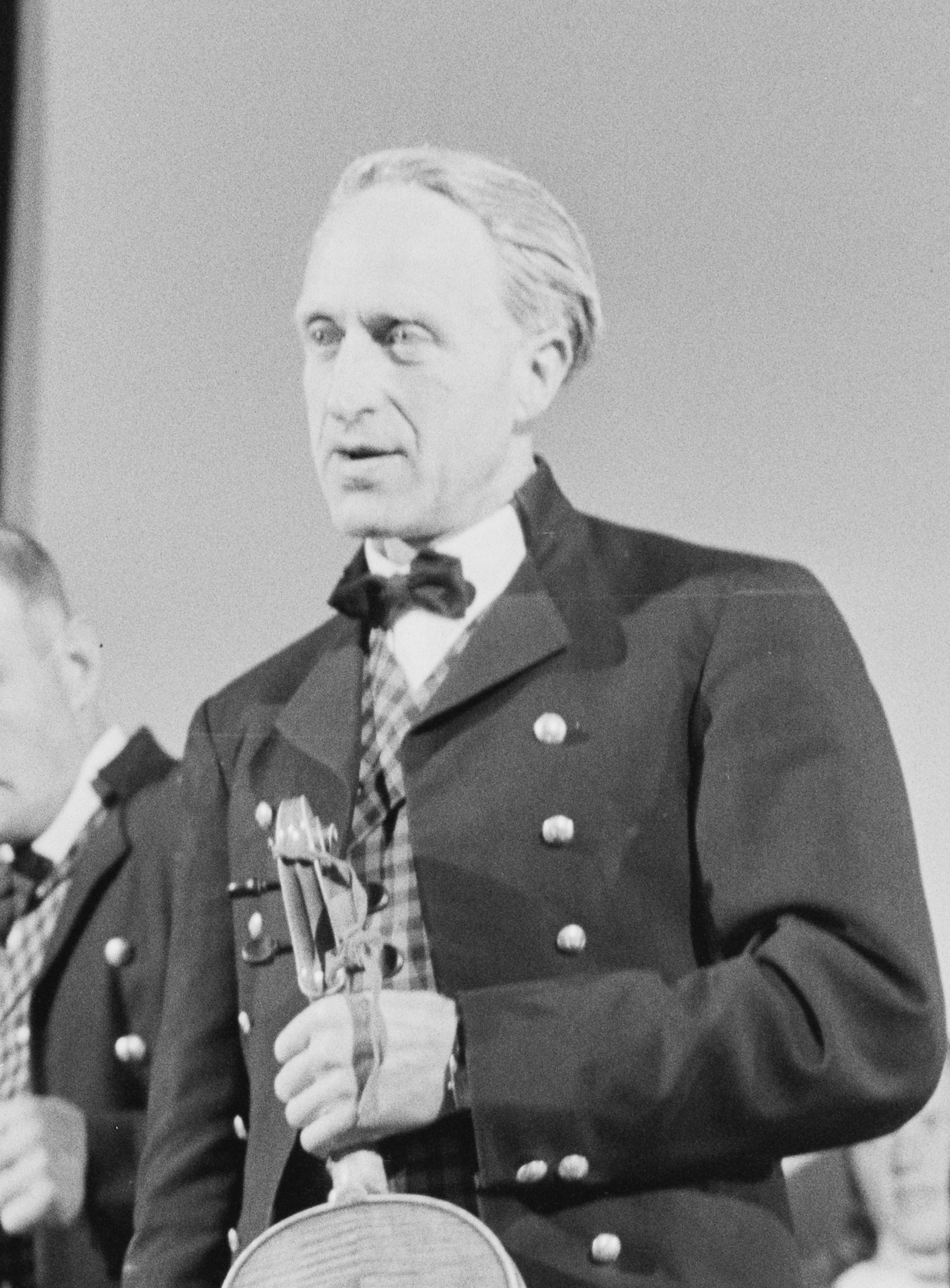
Egil Storbekken in 1963

Egil Storbekken (24 May 1911 – 19 March 2002) was a Norwegian folk musician, composer and instrument maker.

== Life and career ==
Born in Tolga Municipality, Hedmark on 24 May 1911, Storbekken is particularly known for his development of the tussefløyte, a Norwegian version of the recorder. His radio debut with this instrument came in 1952. Notable among his compositions is the well received "Fjelltrall" from 1960.

Storbekken died in Tolga on 19 March 2002, at the age of 90.
