= Hans W. Brimi =

- Birth name: Hans Willie Brimi
- Born: 22 December 1917
- Origin: Norwegian
- Died: 14 June 1998 (aged 80)
- Occupation(s): Fiddler, farmer

Hans Willie Brimi (22 December 1917 – 14 June 1998) was a Norwegian farmer, fiddler, traditional folk music performer, bearer of traditions and musician from Garmo in Lom Municipality.

Brimi was married to Aslaug (born Blakar, 1893–1986), and they had several children Willie, Rolv, Anna, Asta and Astrid. Brimi drifted around after leaving the farm in Vårdalen, and continued as a fiddler and singer when his eldest son took over the farm.

== Biography ==
Brimi is one of the foremost Norwegian folk musicians of the 20th century both as a performer and promoter of the fiddle. He played in NRK as early as 1933. After that time he has been recorded many times for the Norwegian national radio, especially during the 70's when his gammeldans ("old dance") group played over 30 programs. He has won the National Music Competition "Landskappleiken" 13 times, received the King's Medal of Merit, Lom Municipality's cultural award, and was honorary member of LfS in 1977.

Brimi is a great source for slåttespillet and gammeldansen in Ottadalen. He had great fiddlers who Sjugurd Garmo and Ola Moløkken as tutors. In addition laga he much music itself. He has played a lot together with other musicians, such as Jon Faukstad, Geir Egil Larsen and Pernille Anker. He was a guest lecturer at Ole Bull Academy in Voss Municipality for many years.

He conytibuted on many music productions, and was nominated for Spellemannprisen five times. The latest production by Brimi was a compilation album on the label Heilo, with his recordings from 1957 to 1987: Hyljarliv. In 2006 his grandson Aslak Opsahl Brimi released the album Blå September (on the label Talik), where the performance of both grandson and grandfather is presented.

== Discography ==
- 1982: Norwegian Folk Music (Philo Forerunner), with Mary Barthelemy and Jon Faukstad
- 1982: Springleik og Blåtoner (Heilo Music), with Pernille Anker
- 1987: Hyljarhildring (Heilo Music)

With Aslak Opsahl Brimi

- 1987: Blå September (ta:lik)
