= Jack Berntsen =

Norwegian singer-songwriter

Joakim Jan Aril "Jack" Berntsen (14 October 1940 – 5 October 2010) was a Norwegian philologist, songwriter and folk singer.

== Biography ==
He was born in Kjøpsvik in Tysfjord Municipality. He grew up in Hamarøy Municipality, and resided in Svolvær from 1968.

Berntsen founded the Svolvær folk song club Lovisa in 1968, and the Hamarøy music festival Troilltampen in 1973. Among his best known songs is the protest song "Kor e hammaren, Edvard" from 1974, with text by Jahn Arill Skogholt, on the population decline of Northern Norway. His first album was Det e håp i hænganes snøre from 1978. The album contained sixteen songs, some of which had political texts. The album Ongan i Lofoten from 1982 contained songs for children, and was a cooperation with the Cirani orchestra. His album I ly av Lofotveggen from 1984 contained self-written material, and also songs based on Petter Dass' poems "En smuk Aftensang" and "Den nordlandske torsk". In 1986 he issued an album with texts for children, Lilla Bolla Bølla og andre boller. He published the single "Bussjåfør"/"Svolværgeita" in 1986. Among his other songs are "Moltebærvisa" and "Badestrandsballade for korpulente". He published several songbooks. Det e lys lenger frem was issued in 1976, and Sol bakom skyan was published in 1979. In 1981 he published Ongan i Lofoten, in 1986 came the songbook Lille Bolla Bølla, and his book Sanga i søkk og kav was published in 1995.

He was awarded the prize Sølvharpa in 1975 by Dag og Tid, the county Nordland's cultural prize in 1981, the Elias Blix Prize in 1982, and the Prøysen Prize in 1985. A statue of Berntsen is placed in Svolvær. In 2000, a cultural prize, Jack Berntsens kulturpris, was established by Vågan Municipality.
