= Johannes Hanssen =

Norwegian bandmaster (1874–1967)

Valdresmarsjen
Played by the United States Marine Band

Johannes Hanssen (2 December 1874 – 25 November 1967) was a Norwegian bandmaster, composer and teacher. He was born in Ullensaker and was bandmaster of the Oslo Military Band from 1926 to 1934 and again from 1945 to 1946. Hanssen received the King's Order of Merit in Gold and King Haakon VII's Jubilee Medal. His most famous composition is his Valdresmarsjen (Valdres March, 1904), a march celebrating the beautiful Valdres region in Norway that lies between Oslo and Bergen. The main theme is the signature fanfare for the Valdres Battalion, which is based on an ancient melody formerly played on the medieval lur, an uncoiled wooden wind instrument. The melody of the trio section derives from a fiddle tune traditional in Hardanger and a pentatonic folk tune, above a typical Norwegian drone bass line. It was first performed in 1904 by the band of the second regiment of Norway, with the composer playing the baritone horn himself. Numerous settings for brass band exist in addition to various arrangements for concert band and orchestra.

Hanssen died in Oslo, aged 93.
