= Alf Hurum =

Norwegian composer and painter (1882–1972)

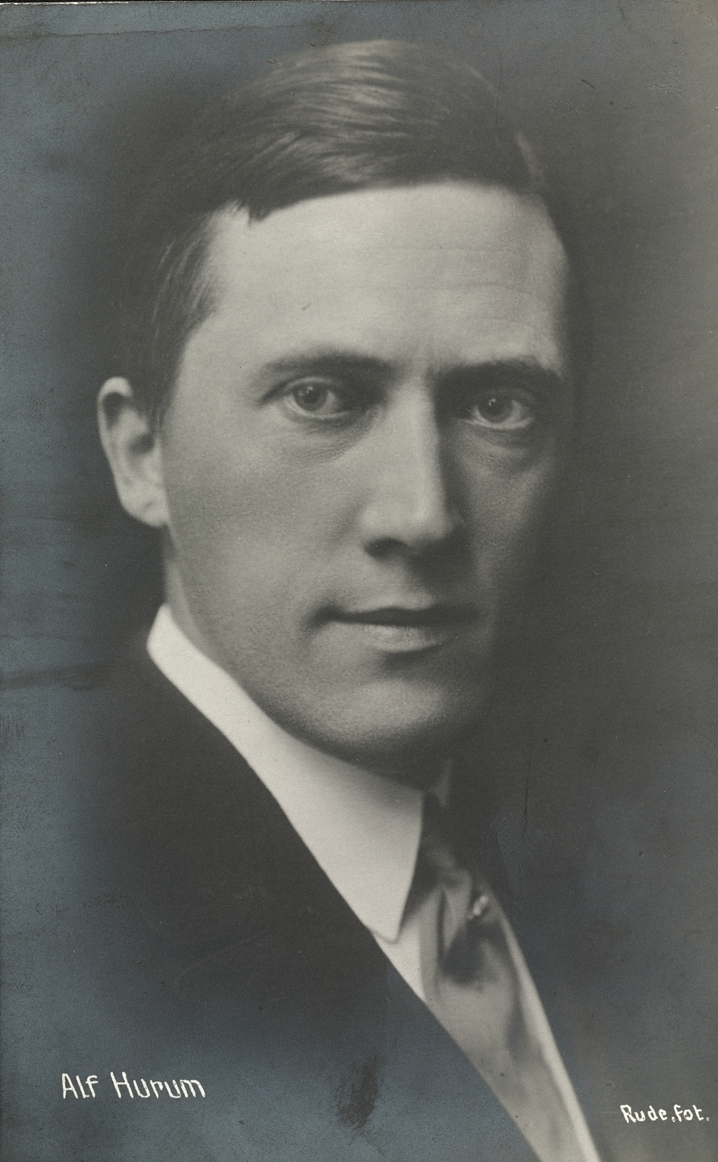
- Born: 21 September 1882; Kristiania, Norway
- Died: 12 August 1972 (aged 89); Honolulu, Hawaii
- Occupations: composer and painter

Alf Thorvald Hurum (21 September 1882 – 12 August 1972) was a Norwegian composer and painter.

== Early and personal life ==
Hurum was born in Kristiania (now Oslo), Norway. He was a son of Thorvald Hurum (1839–1909) and Jakobine Olava Haslum (1844–1929). From 1905 to 1907, he studied composition at the Berliner Akademie der Künste. Among other, his instructors included Max Bruch. He was married in Berlin, Germany in 1908 with Elizabeth Leslie Wight (1884–1984). From 1934, Hurum and his wife settled in Honolulu, Hawaii.

== Career ==
Among his works are two violin sonatas, from 1911 and 1915 respectively, Lilja (for men's chorus) from 1919, the suite Eventyrland from 1920, the symphonic poem Bendik og Årolilja from 1923, and a symphony in D minor from 1927. After settling at Honolulu, he served as president of the Association of Honolulu Artists, and was honorary member of the Morning Music Club. His visual art is represented in the Honolulu Museum of Art and in the Bishop Museum in Honolulu.
