= Martin Andreas Udbye =

Norwegian composer and organist

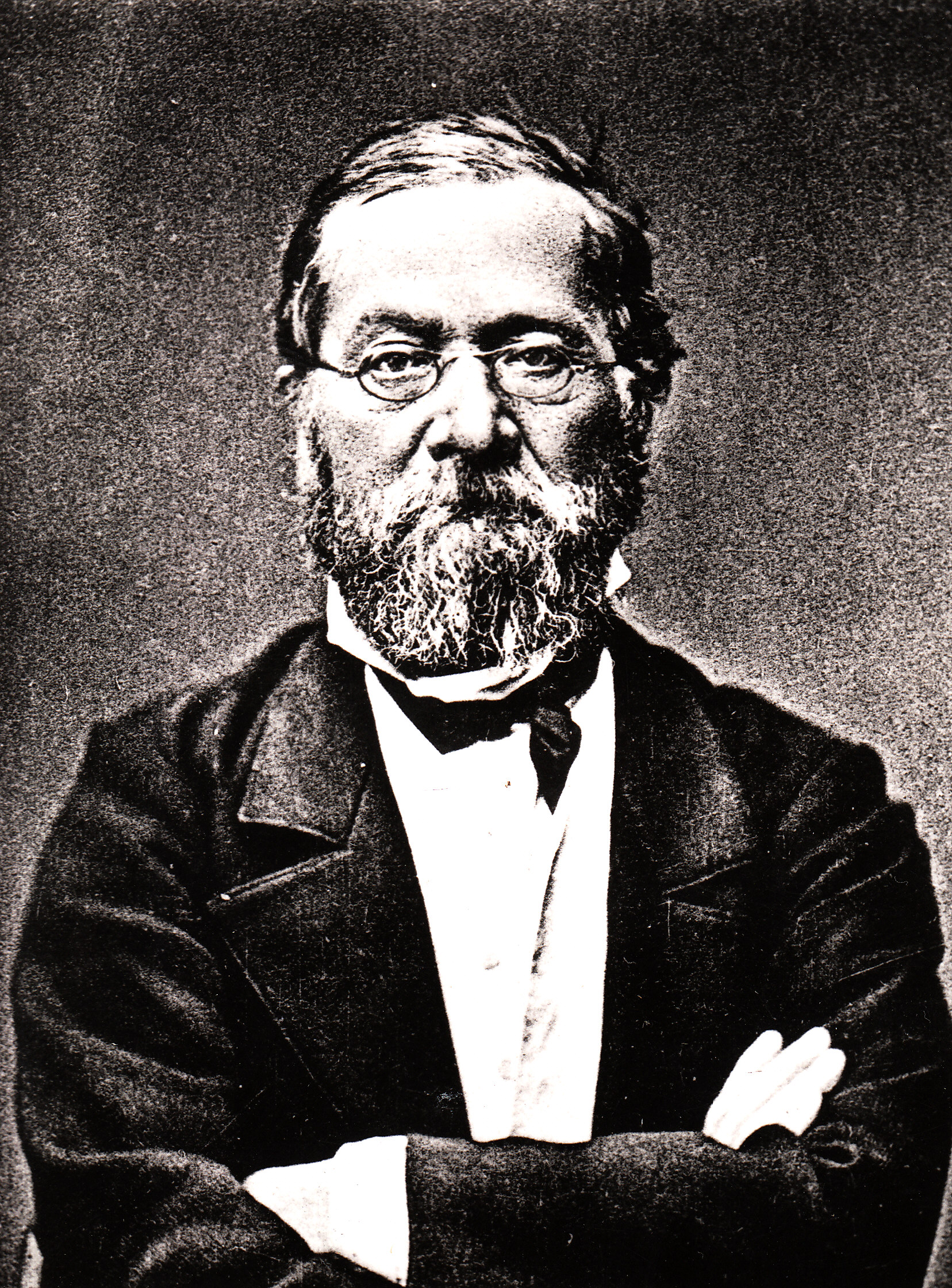
Martin Andreas Udbye

Martin Andreas Udbye (June 18, 1820 – January 10, 1889) was a Norwegian composer and organist.

== Biography ==
Largely self-taught, he produced an impressive output of diverse and complex works, including the first Norwegian opera, Fredkulla.

His other stage works include three operettas: Hr. Perrichons reise (1861), Hjemve (1864), and Junkeren og flubergrosen (1867). He also composed several choruses, three string quartets (1851–5), an orchestral sketch entitled Lumpasivagabundus (1861), a fantasy on Scandinavian melodies for violin and orchestra (1866), 20 piano trios, and 100 organ preludes among other works.

== Other sources ==
- Kari Michelsen. The New Grove Dictionary of Opera, edited by Stanley Sadie (1992). ISBN 0-333-73432-7 and ISBN 1-56159-228-5
