= Harald Lie =

Norwegian composer

Harald Lie (21 November 1902 – 23 May 1942) was a Norwegian composer. He died young of tuberculosis and is mainly remembered for one composition, Skindvengbrev ("A Bat's Letter"), an orchestral song after his own wind quintet.

The poem Skinnvengbrev ("A Bat's Letter") is by Aslaug Vaa and was also later set by Geirr Tveitt; it begins "Eg trudde eingong du hadde gøymt deg, at både du og Gud ha gløymt meg,.." (English: "Once I thought you had gone hiding, that I was forgotten by you and By God, and I was the least of created things"). Kirsten Flagstad recorded Lie's orchestral song, together with a less well known song by Lie, Nykelen ("The Key"), with the London Symphony Orchestra, conducted by Øivin Fjeldstad.
