= Peter Brynie Lindeman =

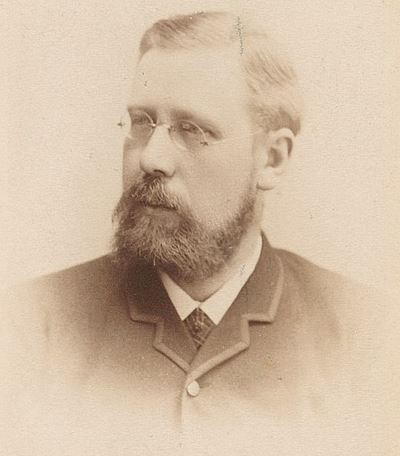
Peter Brynie Lindeman circa 1890.

Peter Brynie Lindeman (February 1, 1858 – January 1, 1930) was a Norwegian organist, cellist, and composer.

== Biography ==
Lindeman was born in Kristiania (now Oslo), Norway. His father was the organist Ludvig Mathias Lindeman and he was married to the composer Anna Severine Lindeman (1859–1938).

Lindeman studied under Erika Nissen in Oslo, as well as in Stockholm from 1878 to 1879 and under Friedrich Grützmacher in Dresden from 1885 to 1886. He was the principal organist at Uranienborg Church from 1880 to 1907, and at Frogner Church from 1907 to 1930. He also played cello in the evenings at the Christiania Theatre from 1880 to 1883.

Together with his father, he established the Christiania Organist School in 1883, with 12 students. In 1885 it had 174 students and was renamed the Music and Organist School. This was renamed again in 1892 to the Christiania Music Conservatory, which was the only institution of its kind in Norway until 1905. Lindeman's wife, the pianist and composer Anna Severine Lindeman, also taught at the school. After Lindeman's death in 1930, his son, the cellist Trygve Lindeman (1896–1979), headed the school.

Lindeman composed many musical works, and also wrote textbooks. He founded the Norwegian organists' association in 1904 together with his brother, the organist Kristian Lindeman (1870–1934), and others. Lindeman headed the organization several times and was the editor of and a regular columnist in the association's newsletter, Musikbladet (Music Magazine), published from 1908 to 1921.
