= Jacobine Gjertz =

Norwegian pianist, composer and writer (1819–1862)

- Born: Jacobine Sofie Gjertz; 13 July 1819; Christiania, Norway
- Died: 1862 (aged 42–43); Paris, France
- Other name: Marie-Gabrielle Bernard-Gjertz

Jacobine Sofie Gjertz (13 July 1819 – 1862) was a Norwegian pianist, composer and writer and one of the earliest women's activists in Norway.

== Early life ==
Jacobine Gjertz was the daughter of Peter Gjertz, a town clerk in Christiania and Magdalene Elisabeth Hoff. She was the sister of lawyer and civil servant Hjalmar Balduin Hoff (1823–1902).

== Life and career ==
Gjerz demonstrated an early talent for playing piano. She received her music education in Copenhagen, where she also studied music theory and composition with the composer Christoph Ernst Friedrich Weyse and Johan Peter Emilius Hartmann. In a certificate dated 13 April 1839, Hartmann emphasised Gjertz's strong interest in music theory, which he thought was unusual for a young lady.

In spring 1840, Gjertz performed concerts in Stockholm and Copenhagen, which were successfully received. Her program included Carl Maria von Weber's Konzertstück and Sigismond Thalberg's Huguenot Fantasia. In an advance review of her concert, Henrik Wergeland stated that she had already surpassed her teachers. Gjertz continued her studies with Danish pianist Bernhard Courländer.

In 1841, she went to Paris on a study trip, where she became a pupil of Friedrich Kalkbrenner. However, Gjertz clashed with Kalkbrenner when he would not allow her to play works by Franz Liszt, because in Kalkbrenner's opinion, his use of physical force to produce orchestral effects was not suitable for a woman. Later in her career, she always had Liszt's and Frédéric Chopin on her regular program. During her time in Paris, she encountered Charles Fourier's ideas, which advocated for equality between men and women and encouraged everyone to develop their natural talents. In a letter to her friend Aagot Hansteen, Gjertz wrote "Isn't it wrong that women should be regarded as unreasonable animals, who can never come of age, who should only be beautiful playthings for the man. But I will not, it shall be so; I want to be free. I can feed myself, I don't have to depend on this stupid world, which is so full of prejudice".

In 1843, Gjertz travelled to the United States, performing concerts in New York City and Philadelphia. In 1845, she married French merchant Gabriel Bernard whilst still in the United States. Following her marriage, she converted to Catholicism, after he introduced her to the religion. After her conversion, she rebaptised herself as Marie-Gabrielle Bernard-Gjertz. The couple returned to France in 1846.

In 1851, the couple returned to Gjertz's hometown of Christiania. Whilst there she performed her own compositions during a joint concert with Emma Dahl. This was the first composition concert and the first women's concert in Christiania.

However, the couple did not stay in Norway, and via Copenhagen and Brussels they returned to Paris. Bernard died there in 1857, and Gjertz was left as a widow with four children. She made a living playing piano as well as by writing articles on art and literature, some of which were published as special prints. In the last years of her life, she also wrote several books.

Gjertz died in Paris in 1862.
