= Oscar Borg =

Norwegian composer

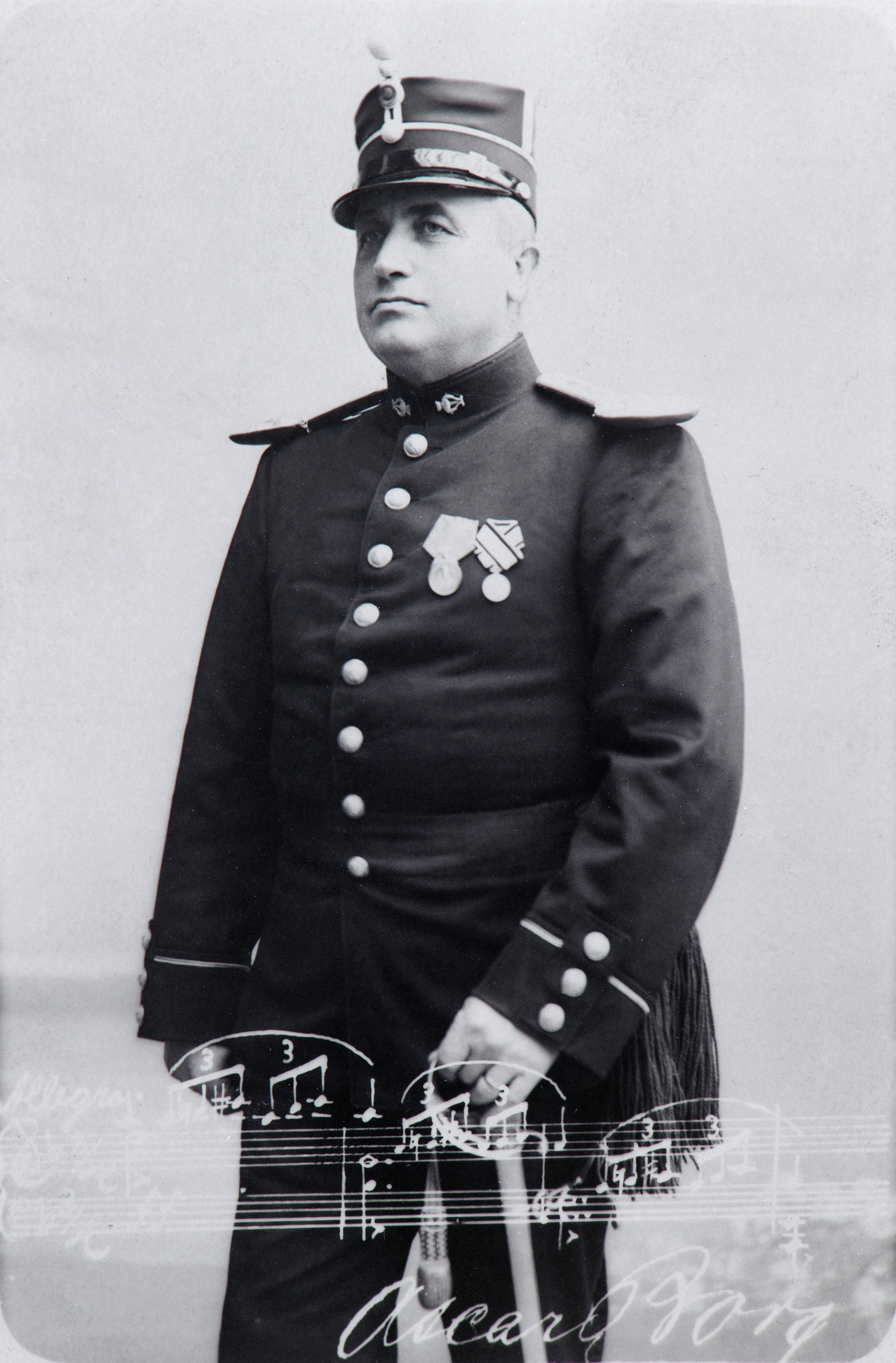
- Born: 11 June 1851; Halden, Norway
- Died: 29 December 1930 (aged 79)
- Occupation: composer

Oscar Borg (11 June 1851 – 29 December 1930) was a Norwegian composer and conductor. He is best known for his compositions of marches for wind bands.

Alfred Oscar Johannessen Borg was born in Halden, Norway. His father, Ole Peter Johannesen (1816–1890), was from the Borg farm in Solør, from which the family name originated. His father was music sergeant in the 1st Brigades Band of Fredriksten Fortress in Halden.

Oscar Borg attended the Royal College of Music (Musikaliska Akademien) in Stockholm, under the sponsorship of the Crown Prince of Sweden, later King Oscar II of Sweden. He entered the academy in 1869 and took the music director exam with top marks in the spring of 1872. He had a contractual obligation to return to his old band. He gave his first concert in his hometown as flautist and violinist during October 1872. When in 1881, conductor Friedrich August Reissiger resigned as director of the 1st Brigades Band, Oscar Borg was his replacement. Borg remained the director of the 1st Brigades Band in Halden until he resigned 11 June 1918.

Borg's compositions are characterized by good melodies, euphonious harmonies and skillful instrumentation. Oscar Borg composed 60 marches for military bands, 275 songs and about 170 arrangements. Among the marches most played are Kong Haakon VIIs Honnørmarsj (1905), Kronprins Olavs Honnørmarsj, Den Norske Løve (1894) and Norsk Turnermarsj (1886). He received the King's Medal of Merit in gold and was made a Knight 1st Class of the Order of Vasa. He was awarded the King Oscar II Medal in gold, and Kaiser Wilhelms Krieg Verdienstmedalje.

== Personal life ==
Oscar Borg was married twice. In 1874, he married Emilie Göthilda Brunstedt (1853–1904). In 1906, he married Marie Gribsrud (1875–1907). Oscar Borg had 12 children, three of whom died early. Several of the children excelled in the artistic direction: Helge Borg (1894–1965) as a composer of dance music, Dag Borg (1893–1966) as architect and artist and his daughter Ellen (Ragnhild) Borg was a singer.

== Other sources ==
- Hjorthaug, S. Oscar Borg. Hans betydning for musikklivet i Fredrikshald og hans mannskorsanger (University of Oslo: 1970)
- Gundersen, E.A. Oscar Borg. Norges Marsjkonge (Skien: 1991)
