= Ståle Wikshåland =

Norwegian musicologist

- Born: 30 June 1953; Stavanger, Norway
- Died: 18 January 2017 (aged 63); Oslo, Norway
- Education: University of Oslo
- Occupation: Musicologist

Ståle Wikshåland (30 June 1953 – 18 January 2017) was a Norwegian musicologist.

He was born in Stavanger. Wikshåland was a co-editor for the music magazine Ballade, and worked for Henie Onstad Kunstsenter from 1981 to 1984. From 1988 to 2017 he was appointed professor in musicology at the University of Oslo. He was also a music critic for Dagbladet for thirty years, and contributed to the contemporary debate on music and art in society. Wikshåland died in 2017 of thrombosis, aged 63.

== Publications ==
- 2007: "Elektra's Oceanic Time: Voice and Identity in Richard Strauss". 19th-Century Music. 31 (2): 164–174. doi:10.1525/ncm.2007.31.2.164. Retrieved 7 May 2016
- 2009: Century of interpretation . Essays on music and music understanding. Scandinavian Academic Press, 2009. ISBN 978-82-304-0047-0
