= Ole Hjellemo =

Norwegian composer and musician

Ole Hjellemo (March 22, 1873 – September 18, 1938) was a Norwegian musician and composer.

Hjellemo was born in Dovre Municipality in Christians amt (county), Norway. He studied under Gudbrand Bøhn and Iver Holter. Hjellemo directed the Dombås Music Society from 1895 to 1906. From 1919 to 1932 he taught violin, harmony, and composition at the Oslo Conservatory of Music, and at the same time was a military musician with the rank of lieutenant in the military band. As a composer, he wrote five symphonies, several other symphonic works and rhapsodies, an award-winning quartet, a violin concerto, and many works for choir.

He lived in Oslo, traveling back to Dovre for his summer vacations, where he instructed the corps and built the foundation for what would later become the Dovre Fiddle Club. Works that he composed for the corps included Norsk Rapsodi (Norwegian Rhapsody), Slått (An Air) and Fra Vågå (From Vågå), some of which are still played. His composition Slått was played by the Norwegian Royal Guards band and drill company in 2002. He also released some roundels from the Gudbrandsdalen valley that he recorded himself.

Hjellemo died in Oslo.

== Compositions ==
- Bellmanstudie (Bellman, a study), in F major for orchestra, 10 min (1902)
- Dikt om en slått og en folketone (Poem on an air and a folk melody), for orchestra, 11 min (1926)
- Dønningernes duv (The pitching of the waves), for orchestra
- Finnmarken (Finnmark), for male choir (TTBB), solo, and orchestra
- Fire springleiker og en vals fra Gudbrandsdalen (Four roundels and a waltz from the Gudbrand Valley), 5 min (1934)
- Fra Vågå: Sprindans (From Vågå: roundel)
- Gavotte – Scherzando – Finale Marciale, for orchestra
- Hamar i Hellom, overture for orchestra
- Høgsommer i høgfjell (Midsummer in the mountains) for orchestra, 6½ min
- Karneval-suite (Carnival suite), orchestral suite (1918)
- Konsert (Concerto), for violin and orchestra in C major, 20 min (1933)
- Marsi: Maestoso marciale (Marches: maestoso marciale), for orchestra
- Rondo Capriccioso: Til Olav Aukrusts dikt "Aksión på Tande" (Rondo Capriccioso on Olav Aukrust's poem "Auction at Tande"), for choir (SATB), solo, and orchestra
- Sagn (Legend), for small orchestra
- Sagn i D-moll (Legend in D minor), for orchestra, 10 min (1934)
- Slått (Folk tune)
- Slått: Symfonisk karakterstykke (Folk tune: symphonic character pieces)
- Spelemannsferd: Symfonisk utdrag av Gudbrandsdalens folkemusikk (A fiddler's journey, symphonic extract of folk music from the Gudbrand Valley)
- Springdans (Roundel), for small orchestra
- Springleik (Folk dance) for orchestra
- Symfoni i H-moll (Symphony in B minor) (1921/22)
- Symfoni i Es-dur (Symphony in E flat major)
- Symfoni no. 3 i A-dur (Symphony no. 3 in A major), 40 min (1932)
- Symfoni no. 4 i E-dur (Symphony no. 4 in E major), 31 min (1935)
- Symfoni no. 5 i D-dur (Symphony no. 5 in D major) (1938)
- To norske folkemelodier (Two Norwegian folk tunes), for small orchestra
- Tve syst – Folkevise (Folk tune), for two voices (MA), choir (SATB), and orchestra (1937)
