= Finn Arnestad =

Finn Arnestad (23 September 1915 — 30 January 1994) was a Norwegian contemporary composer and musician.

== Early life and career ==
Following his 1915 birth in Oslo, Arnestad completed his musical education in various European countries. From the 1950s to 1960s, Arnestad created compositions for the orchestra. Between 1971 and 1981, Arnestad was an executive for the Norwegian Society of Composers.

== Production ==
=== Selected works ===
- Konsert for klaver og orkester (1976)
- Arabesk (1975)
- Toccata (1972)
- Musikk for tre treblåsere (1971),
- Sonate for trombone og piano (1971)
- Væsletjennet for flute solo and strings (1970)
- Ritagliata (1967), Ouverture (1970)
- Klaversonate (1967)
- Smeden og Bageren (J. H. Wessel, baritone and orchestra, 1966)
- Cavatina Cambiata (premiered 1965)
- Dopplersonans (1964)
- Kvintett for fløyte og strykekvartett (1963)
- Suite i gamle danserytmer (kammerorkester med fløyte og obo 1963)
- Aria appassionata (1962)
- Sekstett for fløyte, klarinett, fagott, klaver, bratsj, cello (1959)
- Konsert for fiolin og orkester (1956, premiered 1960)
- Suite nr. 2 (premiered 1964)
- 2 konsert-suiter fra et symfonisk mysteriespill: Suite nr. 1 (1953)
- Missa Brevis for kor og orkester (uroppført 1951), I. N. R. I. (1954)
- Conversation for klaver og orkester (1949, uroppført 1950)
- Constellation (premiered 1948)
- Strykekvartett (premiered 1947)
- Meditation for orchestra (1947)

=== Discography ===
- Christian Eggen, Oslo Sinfonietta, Norges Musikkhistorie - Bind 5 (2001)
- Oslo Philharmonic Orchestra, Orchestral Interference / Finn Arnestad (1996)
- Geir Henning Braaten, Norwegian Pianorama (1984)
