= Adolf Østbye =

Norwegian revue artist and barber

Adolf Østbye (February 1868 – September 5, 1907) was a Norwegian revue artist and barber who became the first person to make a recording in Norway. The earliest playable Norwegian phonograph cylinder dates from 1889.

During the years 1889–1904, Østbye made a series of cylinders, announced "Østbye Record". Several of these are made with cooperation with the Norwegian Pathé manager, William Farre.

== The first recording in Norway ==
In December 1904, Østbye became the first to make a gramophone record in Norway. The record was "Parodi paa Terje Vigen". Edvard Grieg (1843–1907), had made nine records in Paris during the spring of 1903. Østbye's Norwegian recording sessions were held at the Grand Hotel, Kristiania.

Østbye recorded several cylinders and gramophone records. He mainly recorded for Pathé and The Gramophone Company (His Master's Voice) – whose masters were released as Victor records in the US, as well as Columbia cylinders and records. Many of these sold very well, and the most popular title "Bal i Hallingdal" together with Carl Mathisen (September 25, 1870 Holmsbu, Norway – 1933 Ray, North Dakota, US) at accordion remained in the His Master's Voice catalogues until the late 1930s.

Østbye also began to start up his own record company, "Ekko - Kristiania" during 1906–07. These plans were cut short by his illness in 1907. Only two Ekko records are reported to exist today. These records seem to be earlier Pathé and "Østbyes record"s that have been transferred. The reason for this might be that Østbye, at the time, was too ill to record "live". He died in Kristiania (Oslo), aged 39.

On several record labels, Østbye's last name has also been spelled: Östby(e), Østby(e) and Ostby(e).

== Gallery ==
A rare 1906/07 Ekko record from Østbye.
