= Anna Severine Lindeman =

Norwegian composer and music educator (1859–1938)

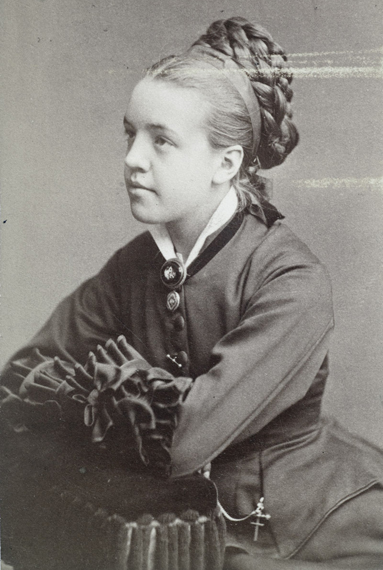
Anna Severine Lindeman

Anna Severine Lindeman (October 29, 1859 – June 24, 1938) was a Norwegian composer and music teacher.

Lindeman was born in Trondheim, the daughter of Peter Tangen Lindeman (1810–1888) and Louise Augusta Bauck (1826–1906). Her father's parents were the organist Ole Andreas Lindeman and Anna Severine née Hickmann. Anna Lindeman learned to play piano from her father's sister, Severine Dos, and was later taught to read music and harmony by her aunt Juliane Cathrine Lindeman Krogness (1816–1879) and uncle Just Lindemann (1822–1894). She traveled from Trondheim to Christiania (now Oslo) around 1878 with her musically gifted cousin Astrid Lindeman Swensen (1855–1936) and devoted herself to music. In 1884 she married her cousin, the organist Peter Brynie Lindeman (1855–1930). After half a year in Dresden, Germany, where Anna Severine was engaged in private piano teaching, the Lindeman family founded a music school in Christiania, which was renamed the Oslo Conservatory of Music in 1892. Lindeman's husband served as head of the conservatory, and she taught at the school from 1912 onward. Her son Trygve Lindeman (1896–1979) was a cellist and succeeded his father as head of the conservatory in 1928. Her daughter Signe Lindeman (1895–1974) was also a composer.

Lindeman continued composing after her husband's death. Her compositions include songs, a string quartet, chamber pieces for piano, and chamber pieces for violin or cello with piano.

She died in Oslo.
