= Trygve Lindeman =

Norwegian musician (1896–1979)

Trygve Henrik Lindeman (November 3, 1896 – October 24, 1979) was a Norwegian cellist and the head of the Oslo Conservatory of Music for two generations.

Lindeman was born in Kristiania (now Oslo). After passing his university qualifying exam, he studied civil engineering at the Norwegian Institute of Technology, and then he switched to studying music in 1916 at the Oslo Conservatory of Music under Gustav Fredrik Lange. He also studied at the Royal Danish Academy of Music in Copenhagen under Carl Nielsen. He debuted as a cellist in 1925, and in 1928 he took over leadership of the Oslo Conservatory of Music from his father, Peter Brynie Lindeman. He headed the conservatory until 1969. Lindeman and his wife, Marie Louise née Swensen, had no children and so they established the Lindeman Foundation (Norwegian: Lindemans Legat) and turned over the directorship of the conservatory to Anfinn Øien, who headed the school until it was closed and succeeded by the Norwegian Academy of Music in 1973. The "Lindeman tradition" in Norwegian music was cultivated by Trygve Lindeman, who believed that everyone is capable of playing, composing, and understanding music theory and practicing pedagogy. Lindeman was a Freemason and held the position of master mason in his lodge for many years.

== Awards ==
- King's Medal of Merit in gold, 1953
- Order of St. Olav, Knight, First Class, 1967

== Publications ==
- Lærebok i taktering for kordirigenter (Conducting for Choir Directors), 1939
- Lærebok i elementær musikkteori (Basic Music Theory), 1943
- Tonetreffing og musikkdiktat (Ear Training and Musical Dictation), 1951
- Orkesterinstrumenter og partitur (Orchestra Instruments and Scores), 1973
- (with Einar Solbu) Musik-konservatoriet i Oslo 1883–1973 (The Oslo Conservatory of Music, 1883–1973), 1976
