= Frants Beyer =

Norwegian tax inspector and composer (1851–1918)

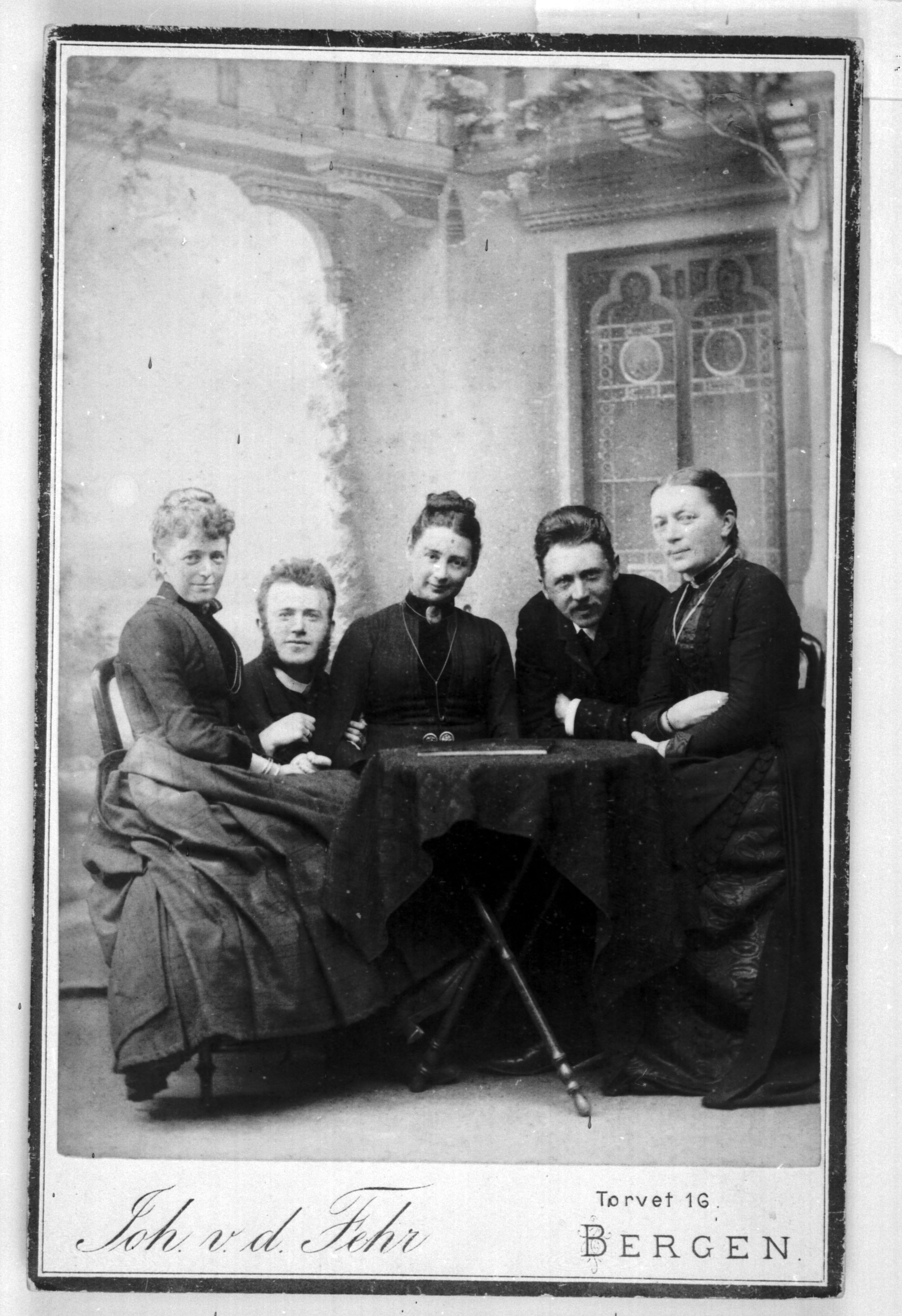
Frants and Marie Beyer with friends Credit: Joh. v. d. Fehr

Frants Diecke Cappelen Beyer (9 May 1851 – 10 November 1918) was a Norwegian average adjuster, tax inspector and composer. He is particularly known for his long-term close friendship with composer Edvard Grieg. A large portion of the letter correspondence between Grieg and Beyer has been preserved and later published. Among his musical contributions are records of eighteen folk songs which formed the basis for Grieg's opus 66. He was chairman of the board of the Bergen Philharmonic Orchestra for many years.
