= Ketil Vea =

Norwegian composer (1932–2015)

- Born: 5 February 1932; Bø in Vesterålen, Norway
- Died: 20 November 2015 (aged 83)
- Occupations: Composer; Pedagogue

Ketil Vea (5 February 1932 – 20 November 2015) was a Norwegian composer and pedagogue.

He was born in Bø in Vesterålen to Olav Vea and Ingrid Vea. Among his orchestral compositions is the series Intrada (I:1963, II:1977, III:1998), Jiedna (1980) and Meet my orchestra (2003). His publications include Spilleboka from 1963, Musikkpedagogisk grunnbok from 1972, and Musikkdidaktikk. Hva? Hvorfor? from 1981. He has worked as rector of Nordnorsk Musikkonservatorium in Tromsø, and lectured at a Folk High School in Hamar. He was awarded Nordland County's cultural prize and the Petter Dass Prize.

Being a composer of northern Norway origin, Vea was inspired by the Sami cultural heritage. A number of his works bear testament to this, including Stallogargo and Jiedna. Many of his other works were written for northern Norway's rich amateur music scene. In later years, Vea composed a number of major works for larger formats including Concerto for Trumpet and Orchestra, Concerto for Clarinet and Orchestra and Meet My Orchestra. His compositions rely heavily on Romantic influences but also feature other stylistic elements including impressionistic sonorous material, expressionism and modernistic aleatorics.

== Production ==
=== Selected works ===
==== Orchestral works ====
- Intrada I, (1963)
- Konsert for fiolin og orkester, (1976)
- Intrada II, (1977)
- Jiedna for sang og orkester, (1980)
- Romanse for fiolin og orkester, (1980)
- Konsert nr. 3 for klaver, orkester og kor, (1984)
- Konsert for trompet, horn og orkester, (1988)
- Nordlandet for sopran, resitasjon og orkester (tekst: K. Sandvik), (1992)
- Intrada III for strykere, (1998)
- Konsert for klarinett og orkester, (2001)
- Symfonisk fantasi for klaver og orkester, (2001)
- Meet my orchestra, ouvertyre for orkester, (2003)

==== Chamber music ====
- Sonate for trompet og orgel, (1972)
- Suite for klarinett og klaver, (1976)
- Blow out for blåsekvintett, (1977)
- Godt at gråmåsen song for kvartett og foreteller, (1980)
- Elegi for to sangere og kammerensemble, (1984)
- Messingkvintett, (1986)
- Fem dampskip, suite for kammerensemble, (1993)
- Ei vise i oktober for fiolin og klaver, (2003)

==== Vocal works ====
- Det är vackrast, sang og klaver, (1972)
- Før det sner, sang og klaver, (1975)

=== Discography ===
- Alf Richard Kraggerud, Meet my Orchestra (2003)
- Arne Brattland, Arctic Suite (1997)
- Tori Stødle, Music from the Top of the World (1991)
- Alta Motettkor, Ottar Grimstad, Under Nordlys Himmel (1989)
- Håkon Stødle, Tori Stødle, Musikk fra Nord (1987)
- Geir Henning Braaten, Norwegian Pianorama (1984)

=== Bibliography ===
- Spilleboka, Norsk Musikforlag A/S
- Metodisk Improvisasjon for lærere, Norsk Musikforlag A/S
- Temaboka, Norsk Musikforlag A/S
- Vi gjør musikk, med Cederløf og Engström, Fazer forlag
- Musikkpedagogisk grunnbok, med O. Leren
- Den nye spilleboka (elev, lærerhefte)
- Musikkdidaktikk, Norsk Musikforlag A/S
- I musikk, Sang og spill og mere til for grunnskole og musikkskole, Norsk Musikforlag A/S
- Musikk – en menneskerett, artikler gjennom 40 år, Norsk Musikforlag A/S
- 30 epistler om musikk i skolen, Veanova
- Synspunkter og kulturblikk, Veanova
- Slekt, minner og meninger, Veanova
- "Med Straumsjøen", Veanova
- "Bø private realskole" red. Veanova
- "Herlige dønninger, Sk/S"Christian Radich" til Madeira og New York sommeren 1948
