= Caroline Schytte Jensen =

Norwegian writer and composer

- Born: Caroline Mathilde Schytte; 1 March 1848; Fredrikshald, Norway
- Died: 24 September 1935 (aged 87)
- Occupations: Composer and writer
- Known for: Children's songs and contributions to magazines, particularly on women's issues
- Children: Gabriel Scott

Caroline Mathilde Schytte Jensen (1 March 1848 – 24 September 1935) was a Norwegian writer and composer.

== Biography ==
Caroline Mathilde Schytte was born in Fredrikshald (now Halden), in Østfold County, Norway. Her parents were Hans Holst Schytte (1815–1893) and Anne Marie Faye (1828–1872). Caroline Schytte was born into the family of a wealthy merchant, in a home marked by cultural interests.

She was married to Svend Holst Jensen (1846–1908), a clergyman in the Church of Norway. The newly married couple settled first in Leith in Scotland, later in London, both sites associated with the Norwegian Church Abroad. After nine years abroad, the family moved back to Norway, where her husband was vicar of Høvåg Church, later at Grimstad Church.

Schytte Caroline Jensen was known in particular for her children's songs. She wrote about 200 songs for children. Among her most popular songs are Ride ride ranke and Venter på far. She was also an accomplished writer. Her contributions on various topics for magazines and newspapers had a large readership, especially among women.

She was the mother of four children including Norwegian author, Gabriel Scott. She died in Oslo at 87 years of age.

== Selected works ==
- Katharina Månsdotters vaggvisa fôr konung Erik XIV, with text by Z. Topelius (1898)
- Spindersken, with text by B. Bjørnson (1895)
- Du är min ro, with text by Z. Topelius (1895)
- 12 nye Børnesange (1898)
- 12 nye Børnesange with text by S. Holst Jensen (1901)
- 12 nye Børnesange (1902)
- Blomster-Eventyr, with text by G. Scott (1904)
- Jesu Hender og mine, with text by C. G. Gordon (1913)
- Getsemane, with text by O. T. Moe (1915)
- Juleklapp, siste hilsen til Norges barn (1929)
