= Theodor Løvstad =

Theodor Julius Løvstad (2 September 1843 – 20 April 1913) was a Norwegian musician, magazine editor and revue writer. He was born in Christiania.

Løvstad was kapellmeister at various establishments in and around Kristiania, including Tivoli, Bazarhallen, Møllergaten teater, Eldorado and Dovrehallen. He published the humour magazine Bakkus from 1878 to 1883, and edited the satirical magazine Vikingen from 1883 until his death in 1913. Among his contributions was the popular column Kjæftausa, signed by the fictitious "Ka'l Olsen fra Vika". He wrote songs and monologues for theatres and several revues, including Fra Vika til Ekebergtoppen. A bust of Løvstad was unveiled in Bygdøy in 1990.
