= Christian Teilman =

Norwegian organist, pianist and composer

- Born: Jørgen Christian Fasting Teilman; 30 July 1845
- Died: 4 December 1909 (aged 66)
- Era: Romantic

Christian Teilman (30 July 1845 – 4 December 1909) was a Norwegian organist, pianist, and composer. He wrote over 250 individual compositions in his lifetime.
