= Eivind Solberg =

Norwegian jazz trumpeter

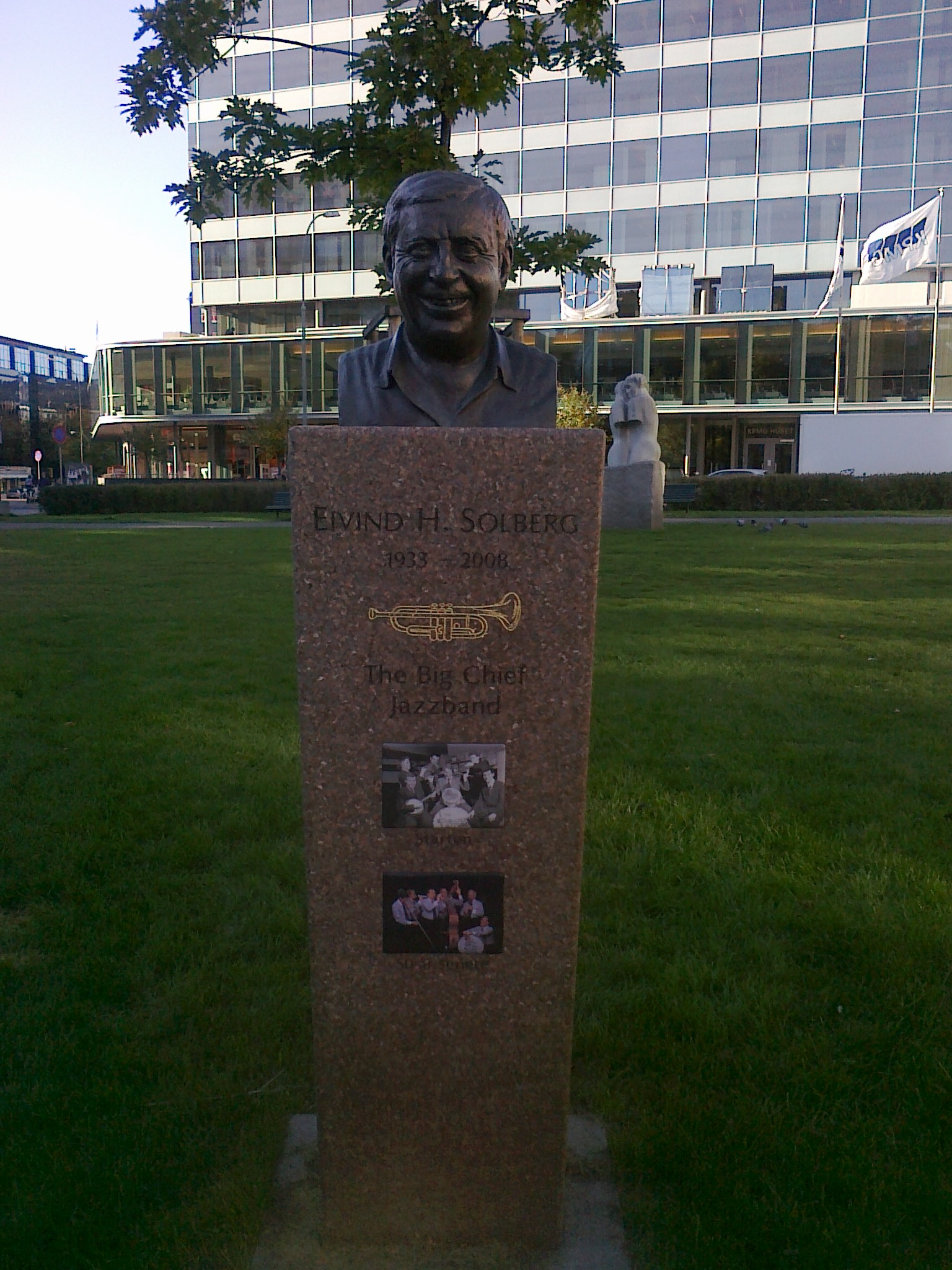
Monument dedicated to Eivind Solberg at Majorstuen, Oslo.

Eivind Holt Solberg (22 May 1933 – 19 March 2008) was a Norwegian jazz trumpeter, known as the founder of Big Chief Jazz Band (1952 -), which is one of the oldest of its kind. He initially played in New Orleans Hot Dogs (1950–1951) with friends from Berg Upper Secondary School. Solberg was often in New Orleans and became a friend of Louis Armstrong. He was instrumental in the establishment and operation of several important concert halls in Oslo, including Big Chief Jazz Club, Kunstnerkroa, Oslo Jazz Circle, Metropol Jazz Center and Downtown. He was for a period editor of Jazznytt and regularly wrote jazz column in the capital's newspapers. Solberg also operated his own impresario agency.

== Awards ==
- Honorary citizen of New Orleans (1967)
- "Ildsjelprisen" from the Royal Norwegian Society for Development
- Oslo Jazzfestival's award (2002)
