= Alfred Evensen =

Norwegian musician

Alfred Bergiton Evensen (17 August 1883 – 2 May 1942) was a Norwegian musician and composer, who in 1918 became leader of the Norwegian Army Band after Lt. Peter Jøsvold retired from the position.

In 1913 he revived the Harstad men's choir, which he conducted until 1930.
