= Almar Heggen =

Norwegian opera singer

- Born: 25 May 1933; Norddal Municipality, Norway
- Died: 22 October 2014 (aged 81)
- Occupation: Opera singer

Almar Heggen (25 May 1933 – 22 October 2014) was a Norwegian opera singer.

He was born in Norddal Municipality. He made his debut at Det Norske Operaselskap in 1957. From 1960 to 1969 he was assigned at German stages, including Deutsche Oper Berlin, Theater Freiburg, Hessisches Staatstheater Wiesbaden and Staatstheater Nürnberg. From 1969 to 1986 he was assigned with Den Norske Opera.
