= Knut Glomsaas =

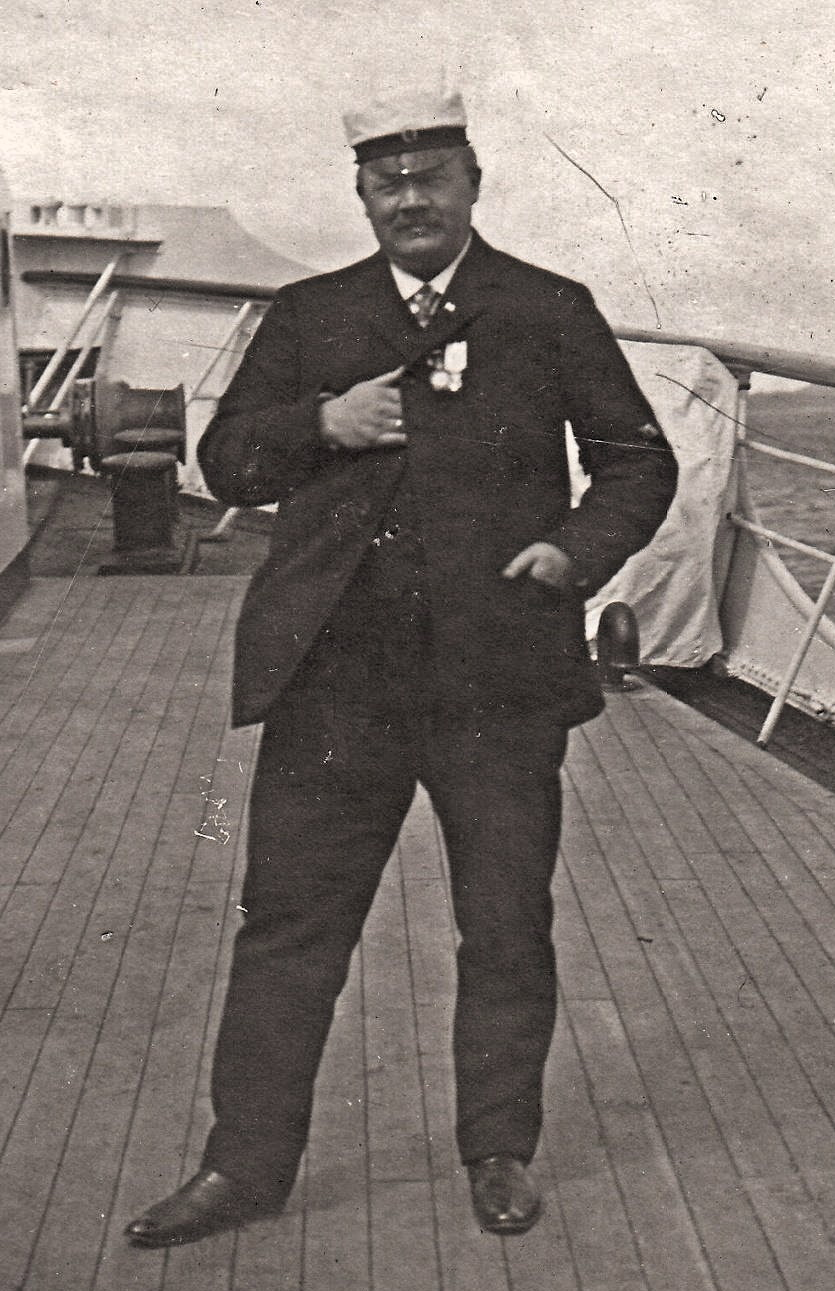
Knut Glomsaas

Knut Markus Hansen Glomsaas (1863–1935) was a Norwegian military musician based in Trondheim. Although he decided to go to America as a 17-year-old man, his father saw his talents and made him join the military as a cornetist in the artillery instead. He studied in Berlin for two years. He was known for his competence, and led and instructed multiple choirs. He wrote music for ballet, marches and military music, dance music, and he wrote a polka for Trondheim's 900-years jubilee.

The street Knut Glomsaas vei in Trondheim is named after him.
