= Beate Asserson =

Norwegian mezzo-soprano

Beate Asserson Saxlund (March 9, 1913 – January 29, 2000) was a Norwegian mezzo-soprano opera singer.

Asserson was born in Bjelland in Vest-Agder county, Norway, the daughter of the priest Aron Bernhard Asserson and his wife Margrethe née Haabeth. She studied under Sofie Brekke in Bergen in 1931, and then in Stuttgart under Martha Haas and in Berlin under Konrad von Zawilowski. After many minor roles, she appeared as Erda in Das Rheingold at the Berlin State Opera in 1936. Her career progressed rapidly, with several roles in Austria, Italy, and France, often under the baton of Herbert von Karajan and Wilhelm Furtwängler. She spent the Second World War in Sweden, and returned to Oslo after the war. At Kirsten Flagstad's recommendation, she gave a guest performance at La Scala in 1954, and then performed in the Ring Cycle at the Paris Grand Opera in 1955.

Asserson was active in the Church of Norway and was married to Eivind Saxlund.

She died in Drammen.
