= Jan Wølner =

Norwegian classical pianist

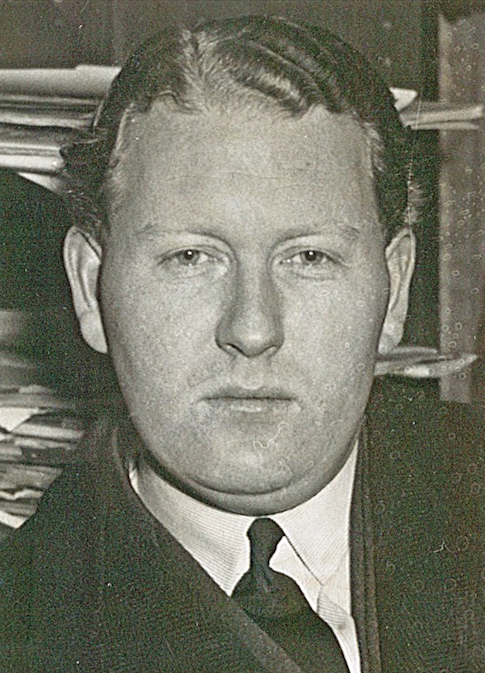
Pianist and composer Jan Wølner

Jan Wølner (18 October 1909 – 7 July 1991) was a Norwegian classical pianist.

He was born in Kristiania. He made his concert debut in 1930, and became known as a performing pianist and composer.
