= Anders Heyerdahl =

Norwegian violinist, composer and folk music collector

Anders Heyerdahl (29 October 1832 – 9 August 1918) was a Norwegian violinist, composer and folk music collector.

He was born in what is today Aurskog-Høland and was the younger brother of engineer Halvor Emil Heyerdahl. He studied music mainly under Carl Arnold. In addition to his own compositions, he spent the years 1856 to 1861 collecting folk music from Hallingdal and Aurskog. The work was published as Norske Dansar og Slåtter. Heyerdahl also published the local historic work Urskogs Beskrivelse, in 1882. He is the great-grandfather of the Norwegian singer Karin Krog and the granduncle of Thor Heyerdahl.
