= Olaus Andreas Grøndahl =

Norwegian conductor, singing teacher and composer

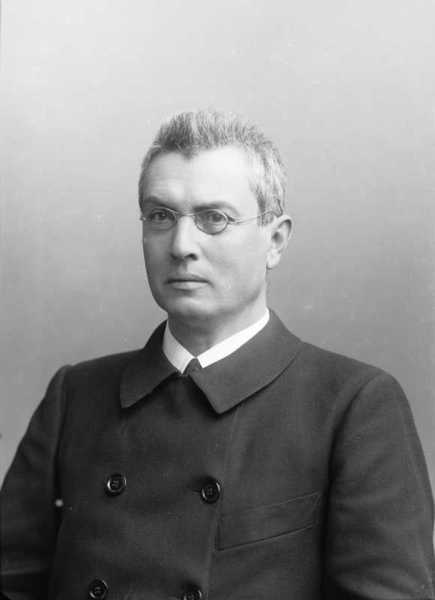
Grøndahl in 1896

Olaus Andreas Grøndahl (4 November 1847 — 31 December 1923) was a Norwegian conductor, singing teacher and composer. The music journalist Cecilie Dahm described him as "... a central figure in Norway's choral movement". His best known work was Foran Sydens Kloster (Ung Magnus og Foran sydens kloster), a cantata for male choir. He also conducted the first performances of several choral works by Edvard Grieg.

== Life ==
He was born in Christiania (Oslo), the son of the book printer Anders Grøndahl and Ingeborg Marie, née Wullum. His father's family was from Romerike, and his great-grandfather settled in Christiania at the end of 18th century.

He took an examination in 1867 and originally studied theology in university where he also directed the Studentersangforeningen (Student Song Society). In 1870, he gave up his theology studies to study singing. He studied in Cologne under Oscar Lindhult (1873) and at the Leipzig Conservatory.

In 1878 he founded a mixed choir.

He was the husband of the pianist and composer Agathe Backer-Grøndahl, whom he married in June 1875, having met in Germany. In the early 1900s, he was conductor for the Norwegian Royal University Male Chorus of Oslo with 45 singers, and in 1905, they visited the United States touring, and performed at the White House for President Theodore Roosevelt. He served as a music teacher at the University of Christiania.

== Death ==
He died in Tonsberg on 31 December 1923.
