= Leif Solberg =

Norwegian composer (1914–2016)

Leif Solberg (18 November 1914 – 25 January 2016) was a Norwegian classical composer and organist.

He was born in Lena, Norway. After studying at the Norwegian Academy of Music he spent his professional career as the organist in Lillehammer from 1938 to 1982. He was also a music tutor and choral conductor. However he is better known as a classical composer. He became a centenarian in 2014, and died in 2016, aged 101.

Solberg's works include:

Organ works: Preludium og fuge i c moll, 1933 Variasjoner over folketonen “Eg veit i himmerik ei borg”, 1933 Fantasi og fuge over folketonen “Se solens skjønne lys og prakt”, 1936 Koralfantasi over “Av dypest nød jeg rope må”, 1937 Preludium, passacaglia og fuge over folketonen “Gå varsomt min sjel”, 1940 Variasjoner over “Mitt hjerte alltid vanker”, 1945 Ciaconna i g moll, 1953

Other works: Maihaug-cantata, 1941/42 Langfredagsmeditasjon, 1948 String Quartet, 1945 Violin Sonata, 1948 Symphony in G minor, 1951/52
