= Emil Biorn =

Norwegian artist and composer

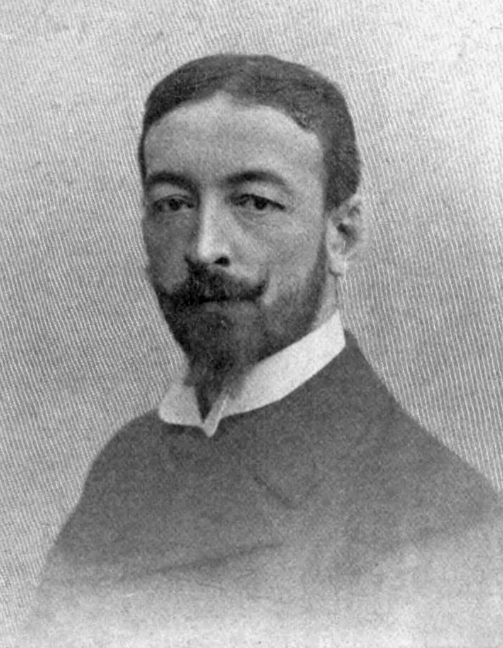
- Born: Emil Christensen Biorn; June 7, 1864; Christiania, Norway
- Died: July 30, 1935 (aged 71); Chicago, Illinois, United States
- Education: Royal Norwegian School of Drawing; Lindeman's School of Music
- Occupations: Sculptor, painter, composer

Emil Christensen Biorn (June 7, 1864 – July 30, 1935) was a Norwegian-born American sculptor, painter, and composer.

== Background ==
Emil Biorn was born in Christiania, Norway, the son of Christian Biørn from Lier and his wife Karoline Agnete, née Høyerdahl (or Heyerdahl), from Aurskog. He was trained at both the Royal Norwegian School of Drawing and at Lindeman's School of Music in Oslo. Biorn studied art in Paris and as well as at the Chicago Art Institute.

== Career ==
In 1887, Biorn came to America, where he was employed as a commercial artist by the Barnes-Crosby Company, an engraving firm in Chicago. He married Sigrid Lowsum (1870–1939) in 1891. From 1906 to 1914, Biorn was principal conductor of the Norwegian Singers' Society of America. In 1914, he conducted that chorus during their trip to Norway to help celebrate the centennial of the Constitution of Norway.

Biorn was both a sculptor and painter, as well as an illustrator and caricaturist. His works were featured at the Minnesota State Fair in 1925 and at the Art Institute of Chicago between 1900 and 1912. His paintings and drawings decorated many Norwegian-American institutions in Chicago including the Norwegian Singing Society (Normaendenes Sangforening), Chicago Norske Klub, and the Norwegian Children’s Home. There is a collection of his art works in the Fine Art Collection at Luther College in Decorah, Iowa.

Biorn died at the Norwegian Lutheran Bethesda Home (now Bethesda Rehab & Senior Care) in Chicago in 1935.

== Other sources ==
- Erickson, Rolf H. Norwegian-American Artists (in Essays on Norwegian-American Literature and History. Northfield, MN: Norwegian-American Historical Association, 1986)
- Haugan, Reidar Rye. Prominent Artists and Exhibits of Their Work in Chicago (Chicago Norske Klub. Nordmanns-Forbundet, 24: 371—374, Volume 7, 1933)
- Lovoll, Odd S. A Century of Urban Life: the Norwegians in Chicago before 1930. (Northfield, MN: Norwegian-American Historical Association, 1988)
- Strand, A.E. A History of the Norwegians in Illinois (Chicago, IL: John Anderson Publishing Co., 1905)
- Sundby-Hansen, Harry. Norwegian Immigrant Contributions to America’s Making (New York, NY: Independent Press, 1921)
