= Per Winge =

Norwegian conductor (1858–1935)

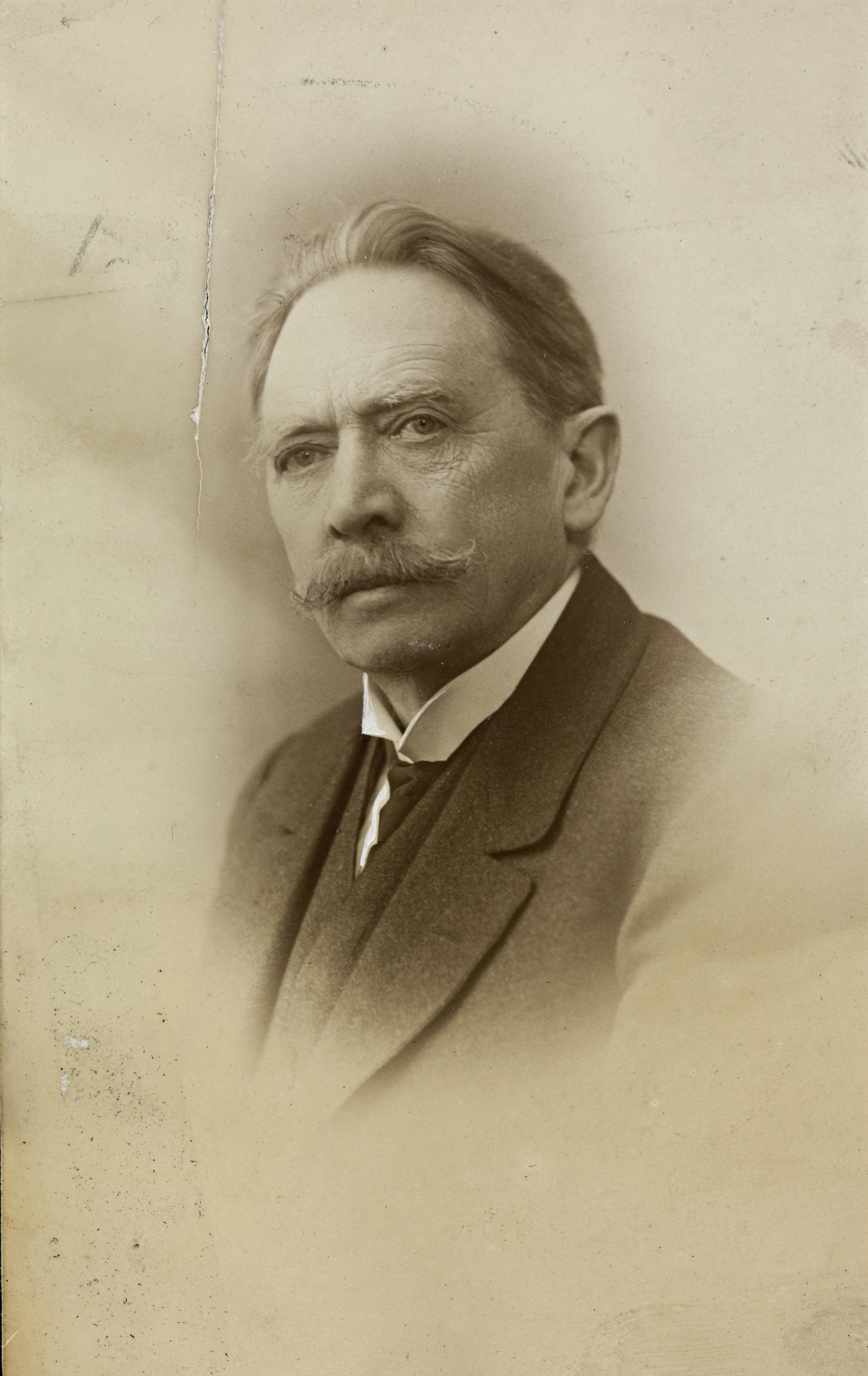
Per Winge Photographer unknown (National Library of Norway)

Per Carl Winge (27 August 1858 – 7 September 1935) was a Norwegian conductor, pianist and composer, known primarily for his vocal music.

Winge was born in Christiania. His parents were Axel Winge and Elisabeth Marie (Betzy) Lasson. His mother's side of the family produced many musicians and artists, including painter Oda Lasson Krohg (1860-1935), composer Nils Lasson, and cabaret artist Bokken Lasson. His sister, Lizzie Winge, was also a pianist, and they would both appear in concert with violinist Johan Halvorsen (1864-1935).

Winge studied piano with Edmund Neupert and Otto Winter-Hjelm, and music theory with Johan Svendsen. Later he studied music in Leipzig from 1883 to 1884 and afterwards in Berlin to 1886.

Winge was music director of Musikselskabet Harmonien (now Bergen Philharmonic Orchestra) from 1886 until 1893, and was also conductor of the Norwegian Studentersangforeningen from 1916 to 1919.

The most important of Winge's oeuvre is his around 60 romances. Among Winge's compositions are the children's songs Kjære lille gutten min ("Dear Little Boy of Mine") and Jeg synger for min lille venn ("I’m Singing for My Little Friend").

== Sources ==
- Grinde, Nils. "Store norske leksikon" (in Norwegian).
- Nils Grinde: Norsk musikkhistorie pp. 249, Universitetsforlaget ISBN 82-00-05639-2 (Norwegian). Retrieved 11 July 2015.
- "Winge, Per". Nordisk familjebok (in Swedish) (2nd ed.). 1921 – via Project Runeberg.
