= Signe Amundsen =

Norwegian operatic soprano (1899–1987)

Signe Amundsen Finsland (9 June 1899 - 13 May 1987) was a Norwegian operatic soprano. She studied singing in her native country with the soprano Mimi Hviid before making her professional debut at the Gamle Logen in Oslo in 1920. She then pursued further voice studies in Rome with Rosina Storchia and made her Italian debut at the Teatro dell'Opera di Roma in 1925 as Norina in Gaetano Donizetti's Don Pasquale. She was heard at that house later that year as Rosina in Gioachino Rossini's The Barber of Seville. She was then heard in the title role of Giuseppe Verdi's Aida at La Scala, and during her time in Milan studied singing further with the conductor Antonio Votto. She was soon heard at the Opéra-Comique in Paris as Santuzza in Pietro Mascagni's Cavalleria rusticana. After further engagements in the French provinces, she became a member of the National Theatre, Oslo where she remained active for the rest of her career. As an educator, she was the singing teacher of Eva Gustavson.
