= Alf Fasmer Dahl =

Alf Fasmer Dahl (20 May 1874 – 21 June 1933) was a Norwegian priest and composer.

== Early life and career ==
He was born in Trondhjem as a son of vicar and composer Jonas Dahl (1849–1919) and Julie Marie Fasmer (1847–1925). In 1900 he married banker's daughter Aagot Ellingsen (1873–1958). Their daughter Pauline Mathilde "Titt" Fasmer Dahl became a children's writer. Another daughter Esther married professor of medicine Erik Waaler.

He finished his secondary education in 1892, studied at the Royal Frederick University and graduated in 1898 with the cand.theol. degree. He served as a curate in the Church of our Lady, Trondhjem from 1899, then in the Norwegian Church Abroad in Antwerp from 1904. He was again curate in Fana from 1913 and Ullern from 1926. He was best known as a composer of choral music and church music, and wrote songbooks and musicological articles on the genre. He was also a known singer, among others performing at the YMCA World Congress of 1900.

== Later life and death ==
He was a fellow of the Royal Norwegian Society of Sciences and Letters, and a board member of the Norwegian Seamen's Mission. He died in June 1933.
