= Erling Kjellsby =

Norwegian organist and composer

Erling Asbjørn Kjellsby (7 July 1901 - 20 February 1976) was a Norwegian organist and composer.

== Biography ==
Kjellsby was born and died in Oslo, Norway. After examen artium (1920) he studied at a teacher training college and an organ school (including under Brustad). After a period of time studying under Fartein Valen he debuted in 1933. He was appointed to organize in Uranienborg kirke (1936) and was appointed as a teacher of music at Oslo lærerhøgskole (1938) where he was the school choirmaster many years, and often figured in the broadcasting NRK. His composition contributions was more neo-romantic and neoclassical, including several works for choir, string quartets, larger orchestras, organ, and piano. By romances could be mentioned Skummel natt ved Troldtjernet, recorded by Kjell Bækkelund on the album Arietta.

As an organizational man, he was long-term board member of the Norwegian Society of Composers and Chairman of TONO (1945–1962), as well as in the management of musician groups at Oslo Filharmoniske Orkester and the national organization for organists. He also conducted the Oslo Arbeidersangforening.
