= William Farre =

Norwegian musician, conductor and composer

William Andrew Farre (born William Johnsen, August 1, 1874 – April 5, 1950) was a Norwegian musician, conductor, and composer.

== Biography ==
Farre was born in Trondheim.

He directed a Salvation Army orchestra in Stavanger in 1895 and also played in a Salvation Army brass band. In 1901 he established the Møllergata School Band, the oldest school band in Norway.

Later, he established the company "William Johnsens musikkforlag og utsalg" (William Johnsen Music Publishing and Sales) in Kristiania (now Oslo). The company printed sheet music for school bands. Farre himself composed some of the music, including the march "Guttene kommer" (The Boys are Coming). His company planned to make sound recordings of over 100 Norwegian dialects, but went bankrupt after recording four dialects.

Farre adopted the surname Farre in 1915.

He died in Oslo.
