= Arvid Kleven =

Norwegian composer and flautist (1899–1929)

Arvid Parly Kleven (29 November 1899 in Trondheim - 23 November 1929 in Kristiania) was a Norwegian composer and flautist.

== Biography ==
Kleven studied flute in Oslo under Axel Andersen and music theory under Gustav Lange. From 1919 he was a flautist in the orchestra of the Nationaltheater, Later he was solo flautist in the orchestra of the Philharmonic Society of Kristiania. He composed a symphony, a symphonic fantasy, a symphonic poem, an orchestral prelude, chamber music works, piano pieces and songs.

== Works ==
- 1917: Vikingtog, march for piano
- 1920: Dæmring for solo piano
- 1920: Vandliljer i et tjern
- 1920: Poema for Cello og Piano
- 1921: Appassionato for solo piano
- 1922: Poeme for Obo og Piano
- 1922: To historiske bilder for piano
- 1922: Lotusland for orchestra
- 1922: To Aquareller for orchestra
  - Clair De Lune
  - Regnbueøen
- 1922: Valse Mignonne for chamber orchestra
- 1922: Canzonetta for Violin og Piano
- 1923: Skogens Søvn for orchestra
- 1923: Der Wald Sleep for orchestra
- 1924: Sonate 1 for Violin og Piano
- 1925: Fiolin Sonate
- 1925: 3 Sange for Sopran og Piano
- 1925: Piano Trio for violin, cello and piano
- 1926: Symfonisk Fantasi
- 1926: 3 Sange for Sopran og Piano
- 1927: Sinfonia Libera In Due Parte
- 1928: Les Preludes, zwei Präludien for piano
