= List of jazz vocalists =

This is an alphabetical list of notable jazz vocalists.

== A ==
- Julie Dahle Aagård (born 1978)
- Mindi Abair (born 1969)
- Oleta Adams (born 1953)
- Lorez Alexandria (1929–2001)
- Karrin Allyson (born 1963)
- Michelle Amato
- Ernestine Anderson (1928–2016)
- Ivie (Ivy) Anderson (1904–1949)
- Ernie Andrews (1927–2022)
- Julie Andrews (born 1935)
- Paul Anka (born 1941)
- Frida Ånnevik (born 1984)
- Laurie Antonioli (born 1958)
- Ken Ard (born 1960)
- Louis Armstrong (1901–1971)
- Tone Åse (born 1965)
- Kristin Asbjørnsen (born 1971)
- Fred Astaire (1899–1987)
- Tora Augestad (born 1979)
- Patti Austin (born 1950)
- Ethel Azama (1934–1984)
- Charles Aznavour (1924–2018)

== B ==
- Harry Babbitt (1913–2004)
- Mildred Bailey (1907–1951)
- Pearl Bailey (1918–1990)
- Anita Baker (born 1958)
- Belle Baker (1893–1957)
- Bonnie Baker (1917–1990)
- Chet Baker (1929–1988)
- Josephine Baker (1906–1975)
- Patricia Barber (born 1956)
- Mary Barry (born 1955)
- Shirley Bassey (born 1937)
- Yolande Bavan (born 1942)
- Dee Bell (born 1950)
- Sathima Bea Benjamin (1936–2013)
- Tex Beneke (1914–2000)
- Tony Bennett (1926–2023)
- George Benson (born 1943)
- Cheryl Bentyne (born 1954)
- Andrea Rydin Berge (born 1984)
- Polly Bergen (1930–2014)
- Jarle Bernhoft (born 1976)
- Andy Bey (1939–2025)
- Christina Bjordal (born 1980)
- Angela Bofill (1954–2024)
- Connee Boswell (1907–1976)
- Al Bowlly (1899–1941)
- Teresa Brewer (1931–2007)
- Dee Dee Bridgewater (born 1950)
- Nora Brockstedt (1923–2015)
- Sylvia Brooks
- Oscar Brown Jr (1926–2005)
- Ray Brown Jr. (born 1949)
- Ruth Brown (1928–2006)
- Ane Brun (born 1976)
- Mari Kvien Brunvoll (born 1984)
- Joyce Bryant (1928–2022)
- Beryl Bryden (1920–1998)
- Michael Bublé (born 1975)
- Sarah Buechi (born 1981)
- Betty Buckley (born 1947)

== C ==
- Bobby Caldwell (1951–2023)
- Ann Hampton Callaway (born 1958)
- Liz Callaway (born 1961)
- Blanche Calloway (1904–1978)
- Cab Calloway (1907–1994)
- Filomena Campus
- Lana Cantrell (born 1943)
- Una Mae Carlisle (1915–1956)
- Hoagy Carmichael (1899–1981)
- Vikki Carr (born 1940)
- Diahann Carroll (1935–2019)
- Georgia Carroll (1919–2011)
- Liane Carroll (born 1964)
- Betty Carter (1930–1998)
- Eva Cassidy (1963–1996)
- Ray Charles (1930–2004)
- Cher (born 1946)
- Emilie Stoesen Christensen (born 1986)
- June Christy (1925–1990)
- Peter Cincotti (born 1983)
- Cristin Claas (born 1977)
- Buddy Clark (1912–1949)
- Jay Clayton (1941–2023)
- Rosemary Clooney (1928–2002)
- Freddy Cole (1931–2020)
- Holly Cole (born 1963)
- Natalie Cole (1950–2015)
- Nat King Cole (1919–1965)
- Russ Columbo (1908–1934)
- Perry Como (1912–2001)
- Harry Connick Jr. (born 1967)
- Chris Connor (1927–2009)
- Barbara Cook (1927–2017)
- Carla Cook (born 1962)
- Sam Cooke (1931–1964)
- Rita Coolidge (born 1945)
- Deborah Cox (born 1974)
- Randy Crawford (born 1952)
- Bing Crosby (1903–1977)
- Jamie Cullum (born 1979)

== D ==
- Laila Dalseth (born 1940)
- Vic Damone (1928–2018)
- Dorothy Dandridge (1922–1965)
- Vivian Dandridge (1921–1991)
- Billy Daniels (1915–1988)
- Maxine Daniels (1930–2003)
- Jacqui Dankworth (born 1963)
- Bobby Darin (1936–1973)
- James Darren (1936–2024)
- Sammy Davis Jr. (1925–1990)
- Doris Day (1922–2019)
- Blossom Dearie (1928–2009)
- Lea DeLaria (born 1958)
- Elaine Delmar (born 1939)
- Tony DeSare (born 1976)
- Johnny Desmond (1919–1985)
- Neil Diamond (born 1941)
- Marlene Dietrich (1901–1992)
- Kate Dimbleby (born 1973)
- Sacha Distel (1933–2004)
- Denise Donatelli (born 1950)
- Larisa Dolina (born 1955)
- Dorothy Donegan (1922–1998)
- Bob Dorough (1923–2018)
- Will Downing (born 1963)
- Matt Dusk (born 1978)
- Dena DeRose (born 1966)
- Johnny Dorelli (born 1937)
- George Duke (1946–2013)
- Bob Dylan (born 1941)

== E ==
- Madeline Eastman (born 1954)
- Sheena Easton (born 1959)
- Ray Eberle (1919–1979)
- Bob Eberly (1916–1981)
- Billy Eckstine (1914–1993)
- Linda Eder (born 1961)
- Kat Edmonson (born 1983)
- Eliane Elias (born 1960)
- Kurt Elling (born 1967)
- Duke Ellington (1899–1974)
- Sidsel Endresen (born 1952)
- Ethel Ennis (1932–2019)
- Helén Eriksen (born 1971)
- Torun Eriksen (born 1977)
- Melissa Errico (born 1970)
- Gloria Estefan (born 1957)
- Ruth Etting (1897–1978)

== F ==
- Georgie Fame (born 1943)
- Alice Faye (1915–1998)
- Frances Faye (1912–1991)
- Michael Feinstein (born 1956)
- Julia Feldman (born 1979)
- Rachelle Ferrell (born 1961)
- Bryan Ferry (born 1945)
- Eddie Fisher (1928–2010)
- Ella Fitzgerald (1917–1996)
- Roberta Flack (1937–2025)
- Mary Ford (1924–1977)
- Tennessee Ernie Ford (1919–1991)
- Helen Forrest (1917–1999)
- Connie Francis (1938–2025)
- Aretha Franklin (1942–2018)
- Michael Franks (born 1944)
- Nnenna Freelon (born 1954)
- Live Foyn Friis (born 1985)
- Jane Froman (1906–1980)

== G ==
- Slim Gaillard (1916–1991)
- Roberta Gambarini (born 1972)
- Anja Garbarek (born 1970)
- Kenny Gardner (1913–2002)
- Melody Gardot (born 1985)
- Judy Garland (1922–1969)
- John Gary (1932–1998)
- Sara Gazarek (born 1982)
- Siri Gellein (born 1966)
- Georgia Gibbs (1919–2006)
- Astrud Gilberto (1940–2023)
- Anne-Marie Giørtz (born 1958)
- Siri Gjære (born 1972)
- Nat Gonella (1908–1998)
- Gabrielle Goodman (born 1964)
- Eydie Gormé (1928–2013)
- Robert Goulet (1933–2007)
- Carol Grimes (born 1944)
- Gogi Grant (1924–2016)
- Peter Grant (born 1987)
- Dolores Gray (1924–2002)
- Buddy Greco (1926–2017)
- Charlie Green (born 1997)
- Jo Ann Greer (1927–2001)
- Silvia de Grasse (1921–1978)

== H ==
- Adelaide Hall (1901–1993)
- Annette Hanshaw (1901–1985)
- Toni Harper (1937–2023)
- Marion Harris (1896–1944)
- Johnny Hartman (1923–1983)
- Donny Hathaway (1945–1979)
- Lalah Hathaway (born 1968)
- Siril Malmedal Hauge (born 1992)
- Tim Hauser (1941–2014)
- Dick Haymes (1918–1980)
- Terra Hazelton
- Hilde Hefte (born 1956)
- Jon Hendricks (1921–2017)
- Arve Henriksen (born 1968)
- Bill Henderson (1926–2016)
- Donna Hightower (1926–2013)
- Hildegarde (1906–2005)
- Billie Holiday (1915–1959)
- Stevie Holland (born 1965)
- Libby Holman (1904–1971)
- Linda Hopkins (1924–2017)
- Jazzmeia Horn (born 1991)
- Shirley Horn (1934–2005)
- Lena Horne (1917–2010)
- Kirsti Huke (born 1977)
- Helen Humes (1913–1991)
- Engelbert Humperdinck (born 1936)
- Alberta Hunter (1895–1984)
- Betty Hutton (1921–2007)
- June Hutton (1919–1973)
- Phyllis Hyman (1949–1995)

== I ==
- James Ingram (1952–2019)

== J ==
- Joni James (1930–2022)
- Jose James (born 1978)
- Pinocchio James (1927–1982)
- Al Jarreau (1940–2017)
- Eddie Jefferson (1918–1979)
- Herb Jeffries (1913–2014)
- Tore Jensen (born 1935)
- Nils-Olav Johansen (born 1966)
- Al Jolson (1886–1950)
- Etta Jones (1928–2001)
- Jack Jones (1938–2024)
- Norah Jones (born 1979)
- Angelina Jordan (born 2006)
- Louis Jordan (1908–1975)
- Sheila Jordan (1928–2025)
- Per Jørgensen (born 1952)
- Maria João (born 1956)
- Samara Joy (born 1999)
- Barb Jungr (born 1954)

== K ==
- Hanne Kalleberg (born 1987)
- Kitty Kallen (1922–2016)
- Lindha Kallerdahl (born 1972)
- Lainie Kazan (born 1940)
- Greta Keller (1903–1977)
- Juliet Kelly
- Beverly Kenney (1932–1960)
- Stacey Kent (born 1965)
- Chaka Khan (born 1953)
- Benjamin Kheng (born 1990)
- Narelle Kheng (born 1993)
- Carol Kidd (born 1945)
- Rebecca Kilgore (1949–2026)
- Morgana King (1930–2018)
- Lauren Kinsella (born 1983)
- Eartha Kitt (1927–2008)
- Hilde Marie Kjersem (born 1981)
- Evelyn Knight (1917–2007)
- Gladys Knight (born 1944)
- Diana Krall (born 1964)
- Karin Krog (born 1937)
- Anine Kruse (born 1977)
- Grzegorz Karnas (born 1972)
- Benedikte Shetelig Kruse (born 1979)
- Jannike Kruse (born 1975)
- Steve Kuhn (born 1938)

== L ==
- Patti LaBelle (born 1944)
- Cleo Laine (1927–2025)
- Frankie Laine (1913–2007)
- Dave Lambert (1917–1966)
- Nancy LaMott (1951–1995)
- Abbe Lane (born 1932)
- Frances Langford (1913–2005)
- Julius LaRosa (1930–2016)
- Queen Latifah (born 1970)
- Bettye LaVette (born 1946)
- Steve Lawrence (1935–2024)
- Linda Lawson (1936–2022)
- Barbara Lea (1929–2011)
- Beate S. Lech (born 1974)
- Peggy Lee (1920–2002)
- Sara Leib (born 1981)
- Ketty Lester (born 1934)
- Ted Lewis (1892–1971)
- Abbey Lincoln (1930–2010)
- Mette Lindberg (born 1983)
- Ella Logan (1910–1969)
- Julie London (1926–2000)
- Claudine Longet (born 1942)
- Halie Loren (born 1984)
- Nick Lucas (1897–1982)
- Jon Lucien (1942–2007)
- Lorna Luft (born 1952)
- Carmen Lundy (born 1954)
- Nellie Lutcher (1912–2007)
- Vera Lynn (1917–2020)
- Gloria Lynne (1929–2013)

== M ==
- Seth MacFarlane (born 1973)
- Gordon MacRae (1921–1986)
- Kevin Mahogany (1958–2017)
- Melissa Manchester (born 1951)
- Monica Mancini (born 1952)
- Kitty Margolis (born 1955)
- Rene Marie (born 1955)
- Rose Marie (1923–2017)
- Hannah Marshall (born 1980)
- Claire Martin (born 1967)
- Dean Martin (1917–1995)
- Tony Martin (1913–2012)
- Al Martino (1927–2009)
- Johnny Mathis (born 1935)
- Marilyn Maye (born 1928)
- Mina Mazzini (born 1940)
- Susannah McCorkle (1946–2001)
- Zara McFarlane (born 1983)
- Bobby McFerrin (born 1950)
- Maureen McGovern (born 1949)
- Cécile McLorin Salvant (born 1989)
- Carmen McRae (1920–1994)
- George Melly (1926–2007)
- Katie Melua (born 1984)
- Johnny Mercer (1909–1976)
- Mabel Mercer (1900–1984)
- Helen Merrill (born 1930)
- George Michael (1963–2016)
- Bette Midler (born 1945)
- Liza Minnelli (born 1946)
- Seela Misra (born 1970)
- Guy Mitchell (1927–1999)
- Joni Mitchell (born 1943)
- Anna Mjöll (born 1970)
- Tone Lise Moberg (born 1970)
- Jane Monheit (born 1977)
- Matt Monro (1930–1985)
- Jaye P. Morgan (born 1931)
- Helen Morgan (1900–1941)
- Jane Morgan (1924–2025)
- Ella Mae Morse (1924–1999)
- Lee Morse (1897–1954)
- Nana Mouskouri (born 1934)
- Mark Murphy (1932–2015)

== N ==
- Willie Nelson (born 1933)
- Silje Nergaard (born 1966)
- Aaron Neville (born 1941)
- Art Neville (1937–2019)
- Cyril Neville (born 1948)
- Ivan Neville (born 1959)
- Anthony Newley (1931–1999)
- Wayne Newton (born 1942)
- Judy Niemack (born 1954)
- Gertrude Niesen (1911–1975)
- Lina Nyberg (born 1970)
- Lena Nymark (born 1980)
- Laura Nyro (1947–1997)

== O ==
- Helen O'Connell (1920–1993)
- Anita O'Day (1919–2006)
- Kelli O’Hara (born 1976)
- Jane Olivor (born 1947)
- Renee Olstead (born 1989)

== P ==
- Patti Page (1927–2013)
- Jane Paknia (born 2000)
- Robert Palmer (1949–2003)
- Diana Panton
- Gretchen Parlato (born 1976)
- Rebecca Parris (1951–2018)
- Alan Paul (born 1949)
- Freda Payne (born 1942)
- John Payne (1912–1989)
- Bernadette Peters (born 1948)
- Madeleine Peyroux (born 1974)
- Esther Phillips (1935–1984)
- John Pizzarelli (born 1960)
- King Pleasure (1922–1982)
- Valentina Ponamoryova (born 1939)
- Gregory Porter (born 1971)
- Dory Previn (1925–2012)
- Rachael Price (born 1985)
- Louis Prima (1910–1978)
- Jeanfrançois Prins (born 1967)
- Flora Purim (born 1942)
- Arthur Prysock (1924–1997)

== Q ==
- Ray Quinn (born 1988)

== R ==
- Corinne Bailey Rae (born 1979)
- Ma Rainey (1886–1939)
- John Raitt (1917–2005)
- Eldbjørg Raknes (born 1970)
- Sue Raney (born 1940)
- Kenny Rankin (1940–2009)
- Lou Rawls (1933–2006)
- Johnnie Ray (1927–1990)
- Martha Raye (1916–1994)
- Ray Reach (born 1948)
- Leon Redbone (1949–2019)
- Lucy Reed (1921–1998)
- Della Reese (1931–2017)
- Dianne Reeves (born 1956)
- Dax Reynosa (born 1969/1970)
- Rita Reys (1924–2013)
- Betty Jane Rhodes (1921–2011)
- Buddy Rich (1917–1987)
- Cliff Richard (born 1940)
- Ann Richards (1935–1982)
- Trudy Richards (1920–2008)
- Harry Richman (1895–1972)
- June Richmond (1915–1962)
- Mavis Rivers (1929–1992)
- Ane Carmen Roggen (born 1978)
- Ida Roggen (born 1978)
- Live Maria Roggen (born 1970)
- Linda Ronstadt (born 1946)
- Annie Ross (1930–2020)
- Elin Rosseland (born 1959)
- Marita Røstad (born 1978)
- Dennis Rowland (born 1948)
- Vanessa Rubin (born 1957)
- Patrice Rushen (born 1954)
- Jimmy Rushing (1902–1972)
- Andy Russell (1919–1992)
- Brenda Russell (born 1949)
- Bobby Rydell (1942–2022)

== S ==
- Jean Sablon (1906–1994)
- Sade (born 1959)
- Cecile McLorin Salvant (born 1989)
- Kathy Sanborn
- Annette Sanders (born 1937 or 1938)
- Tommy Sands (born 1937)
- Natalie Sandtorv (born 1988)
- Marit Sandvik (born 1956)
- Diane Schuur (born 1953)
- Hazel Scott (1920–1981)
- Jimmy Scott (1925–2014)
- Gil Scott-Heron (1949–2011)
- Janet Seidel (1955–2017)
- Gunhild Seim (born 1973)
- Nina Shatskaya (born 1966)
- Ian Shaw (born 1962)
- Marlena Shaw (1942–2024)
- Svetlana Shmulyian (born 1972)
- Dinah Shore (1916–1994)
- Bobby Short (1924–2005)
- Ben Sidran (born 1943)
- Janis Siegel (born 1952)
- Ginny Simms (1913–1994)
- Shel Silverstein (1930–1999)
- Carly Simon (born 1943)
- Nina Simone (1933–2003)
- Heidi Skjerve (born 1979)
- Anja Eline Skybakmoen (born 1984)
- Solveig Slettahjell (born 1971)
- Carol Sloane (1937–2023)
- Bessie Smith (1894–1937)
- June Smith (jazz singer) (1930–2016)
- Kate Smith (1907–1986)
- Keely Smith (1928–2017)
- Frank Sinatra (1915–1998)
- Frank Sinatra Jr. (1944–2016)
- Phoebe Snow (1952–2011)
- Jeri Southern (1926–1991)
- Luciana Souza (born 1966)
- Esperanza Spalding (born 1984)
- Dusty Springfield (1939–1999)
- Dorothy Squires (1915–1998)
- Jo Stafford (1917–2008)
- Lyn Stanley
- Mary Stallings (born 1939)
- Kay Starr (1922–2016)
- Dakota Staton (1930–2007)
- Rod Stewart (born 1945)
- Curtis Stigers (born 1965)
- Liv Stoveland (born 1965)
- Barbra Streisand (born 1942)
- Kjersti Stubø (born 1970)
- Maxine Sullivan (1911–1987)
- Tierney Sutton (born 1963)
- Pat Suzuki (born 1934)
- Frank Sylvano (1901–1964)
- Sylvia Syms (1934–1992)
- Nikoletta Szőke (born 1983)

== T ==
- Rohey Taalah (born 1993)
- Eva Taylor (1895–1977)
- Jack Teagarden (1905–1964)
- Clare Teal (born 1973)
- Leon Thomas (1937–1999)
- Kay Thompson (1909–1998)
- Teri Thornton (1934–2000)
- Martha Tilton (1915–2006)
- Radka Toneff (1952–1982)
- Mel Tormé (1925–1999)
- Heine Totland (born 1970)
- Arthur Tracy (1899–1997)
- Sophie Tucker (1887–1966)
- Big Joe Turner (1911–1985)
- Steve Tyrell (born 1944)

== U ==
- Leonid Utesov (1895–1982)

== V ==
- Jerry Vale (1930–2014)
- Caterina Valente (1931–2024)
- Rudy Vallee (1901–1986)
- Frankie Vaughan (1928–1999)
- Sarah Vaughan (1924–1990)
- Marlene VerPlanck (1933–2018)
- Roseanna Vitro (born 1951)

== W ==
- Susanna Wallumrød (born 1979)
- Helen Ward (1913–1998)
- Anita Wardell (born 1961)
- Dionne Warwick (born 1940)
- Dinah Washington (1924–1963)
- Ethel Waters (1896–1977)
- Cleveland Watkiss (born 1959)
- Joan Weber (1935–1981)
- Elisabeth Welch (1904–2003)
- Carol Welsman (born 1960)
- Magni Wentzel (born 1945)
- Kate Westbrook (born 1939)
- Margaret Whiting (1924–2011)
- Catherine Whitney (born 1954)
- Lee Wiley (1915–1975)
- Andy Williams (1927–2012)
- Danny Williams (1942–2005)
- Joe Williams (1918–1999)
- Midge Williams (1915–1952)
- Robbie Williams (born 1974)
- Cassandra Wilson (1955–2026)
- Julie Wilson (1924–2015)
- Nancy Wilson (1937–2018)
- Pauline Wilson
- Amy Winehouse (1983–2011)
- Norma Winstone (born 1941)
- Jimmy Witherspoon (1920–1997)
- Lizz Wright (born 1980)

== Z ==
- Linnzi Zaorski (born 1978)
- Lena Zavaroni (1963–1999)
- Monica Zetterlund (1937–2005)

== See also ==
- Lists of musicians
