= Benedikte Shetelig Kruse =

Norwegian singer and actor

Benedikte Kruse
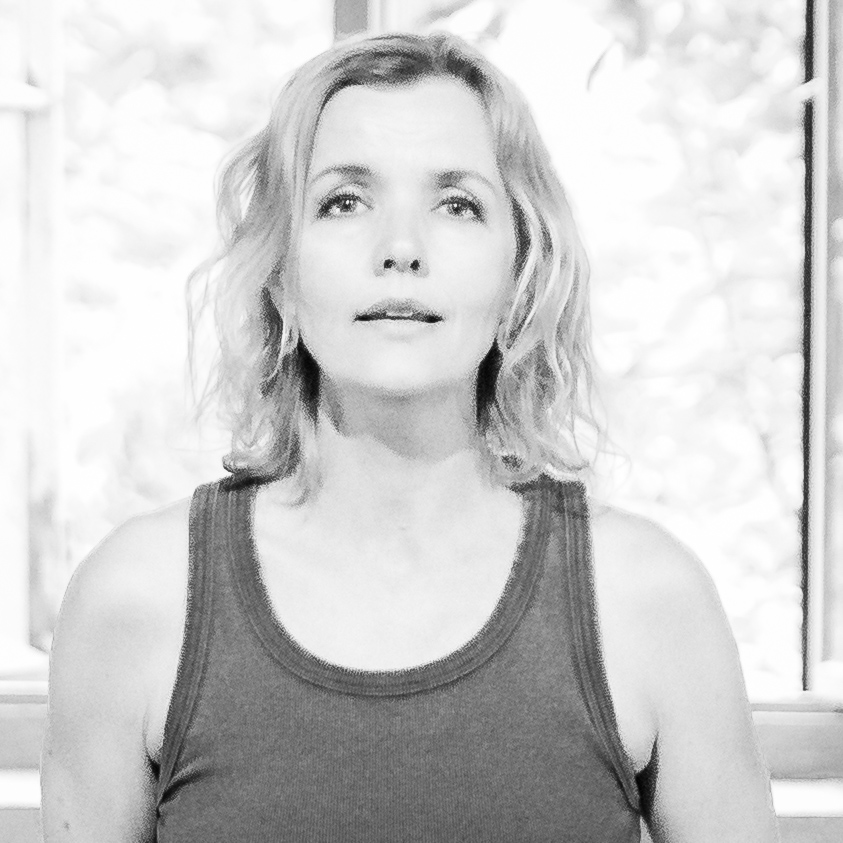
- Benedikte Kruse performing at Blå Himmel, Oslo 2024; Photo: Tore Sætre

Background information
- Born: Kruse with Pitsj at Ingensteds 10 September 2016. 20 December 1979 (age 46); Oslo
- Origin: Norway
- Genres: Jazz, musical, choral music
- Occupations: Musician and actor
- Instrument: Vocals
- Labels: Grappa Music; Universal Music
- Website: Official website

Benedikte Shetelig Kruse (born 20 December 1979 in Oslo, Norway) is a Norwegian singer and actor, daughter of Professor of music, Gro Shetelig Kruse, and the Composer Bjørn Kruse. She is the sister of actress and singers Jannike and Anine Kruse.

== Career ==
Kruse studied music at the Foss videregående skole, and is a graduated singer and singing teacher from the Norwegian Academy of Music, with experience from theater and television. She has worked with educational music programs for children and youth together with Anja Eline Skybakmoen. In 2004 together with Ane Carmen Roggen, she sang the choir on the record Nomadesongar with Lars Klevstrand.

Together with her sister Anine Kruse, Anja Eline Skybakmoen, Ane Carmen Roggen and Ida Roggen she comprises the vocal group Pitsj. and has also done many dubbing jobs. In 2011 she performed the Show Pitsj & Gumbo at the Oslo Concert Hall, where "A capella møter en hot New Orleans-rett" (A capella meets a hot New Orleans Dish).

In January 2014, the Kruse sisters celebrated music with a New Year Show, getting excellent recipient in the local press.

== Discography ==
- 1992: Wenches Jul (CNR Records), with Wenche Myhre
- 2004: Nomadesongar (Tylden & Co), with Lars Klevstrand
- 2005: Distant Shores (Everyday Records), with Trond Teigen'
- 2005: Rain (Everyday Records), with Paal Flaata
- 2006: Pitsj (Grappa), within Pitsj
- 2009: Gjenfortellinger (Grappa), within Pitsj
- 2009: Edvard Grieg in jazz mood (Universal Music, 2009), Pitsj with Kjell Karlsen ("I Dovregubbens hall")
- 2009: Med Andre Ord (DnC), with Jannike Kruse
- 2009: Autographs (EMC Classic), with Otto Graf
- 2010: 16 Sanger Til Maneten Medusa (Schmell), with Åshild Watne
- 2014: Snow Is Falling (Grappa Music)
