= Åshild =

Norwegian feminine given name

Åshild is a Norwegian female given name from Old Norse Áshildr (áss = god, hildr = battle).

== Persons with the given name Åshild ==
- Åshild Anmarkrud (born 1939), Norwegian politician
- Åshild Breie Nyhus (born 1975), Norwegian musician/artist
- Åshild Hauan (1941–2017), Norwegian politician
- Åshild Irgens (born 1976), Norwegian illustrator
- Åshild Karlstrøm Rundhaug (born 1955), Norwegian politician
- Åshild Ulstrup (born 1934), Norwegian author and radio journalist
- Åshild Watne (born 1961), Norwegian musicologist
