= Pitsj (album) =

Studio album by Pitsj
- Released: 2006
- Genre: Jazz
- Length: 43:29
- Label: Grappa Music
- Producer: Anders Edenroth

Pitsj chronology
Pitsj (2006)	Gjenfortellinger (2009)

Pitsj is the debut album by the female Norwegian a cappella quintet, Pitsj. The album was released in 2006 through Grappa Music.

== Track listing ==
1. "Voi Voi" (2:19)
  (Georg Elgaaen / Arr.: Anders Edenroth)
2. "Sangen om gleden" (3:41)
  (Erik Hillestad/Sigvart Dagsland / Arr.: Bjørn Kruse)
3. "Kjære ikkje vekk meg når du går" (2:44)
  (Ingvar Hovland/Svein Olav Hyttebakk / Arr.: Ane Carmen Roggen)
4. "Telefon" (2:57)
  (Jan Eggum / Arr.: Marius Løken)
5. "Splitter pine" (2:43)
  (Kjartan Kristiansen / Arr.: Helge Lien/Ane Carmen Roggen)
6. "Ryktet forteller" (3:35)
  (Jan Eggum / Arr.: Marius Løken)
7. "Øyeblikket" (2:57)
  (Kari Bremnes/Lars Bremnes / Arr.: Bjørn Skjelbred)
8. "Intet er nytt under solen" (2:39)
  (Arne Bendiksen / Arr.: Even Kruse Skatrud)
9. "Tanta til Beate" (3:12)
  (Lillebjørn Nilsen / Arr.: Børre Dalhaug)
10. "Et liv for meg" (4:28)
  (Anders Edenroth / Norsk oversettelse: Stig Krogstad)
11. "Den du veit" (3:49)
  (Marius Müller / Arr.: Eyvind Gulbrandsen/Ida Roggen)
12. "Gåte ved gåte" (3:45)
  (Kari Bremnes / Arr.: Thor-Erik Fjellvang)
13. "Jeg reiser alene" (2:40)
  (Ole Paus / Arr.: Andreas Utnem)

== Personnel ==
- Anine Kruse – vocals
- Benedikte Kruse – vocals
- Ane Carmen Roggen – vocals
- Ida Roggen – vocals
- Tora Augestad – vocals

Production

- Anders Edenroth – producer
