= Anja Eline Skybakmoen =

Norwegian jazz musician and band leader

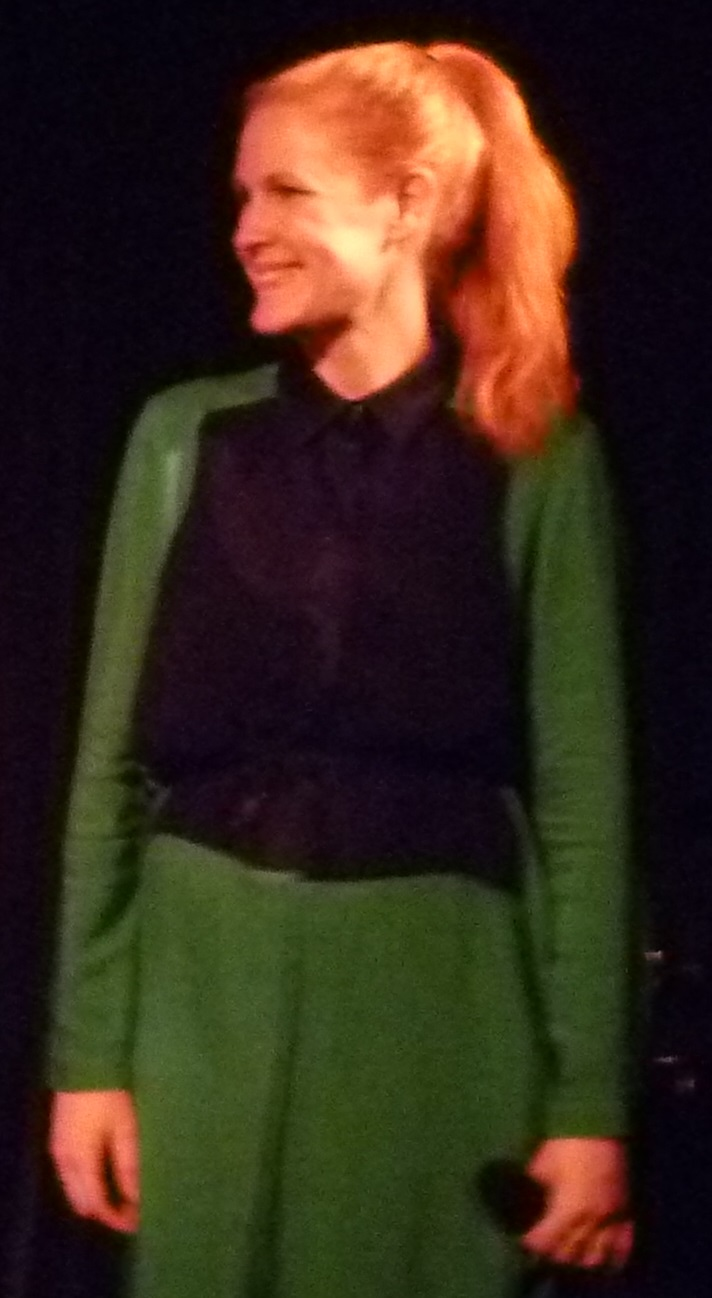
- Skybakmoen with Pitsj at Ingensteds 10 September 2016.

Background information
- Born: 17 October 1984 (age 41); Trondheim, Sør-Trøndelag
- Origin: Norway
- Genres: Jazz
- Occupations: Jazz singer, composer and band leader
- Instrument: Vocals
- Website: www.anjaeline.no

Anja Eline Skybakmoen (born 17 October 1984 in Trondheim, Norway) is a Norwegian jazz singer, composer and band leader, the younger sister of guitarist Jonas Skybakmoen, and married 31 July 2014, to the guitarist David Aleksander Sjølie.

== Career ==
Skybakmoen was educated at Norges Musikkhøgskole in Oslo. She has sung in projects like Eplemøya Songlag and Aphrodisiac. She replaced Tora Augestad in the vocal group Pitsj, and appeared on the album Gjenfortellinger (2009) together with the sisters Anine and Benedikte Kruse, and the twin sisters Ane Carmen and Ida Roggen. In 2013 she appeared for the first time with her own Anja Eline Skybakmoen Band including with Sebastian Haugen-Markussen (bass), Ivar Loe Bjørnstad (drums), David Aleksander Sjølie (guitar), Dag-Filip Roaldsnes (rhodes & synth) and Kim-Erik Pedersen (saxophon). She presented original material at Moldejazz and released her debut solo album We’re The Houses (2014).

== Honors ==
- 2012: Jazz Talent Award at the Moldejazz
- 2012: Geir Digernes Minnepris at the Trondheim Jazz Festival

== Discography ==
=== Solo albums ===
- 2014: We're The Houses (Øra Fonogram)
- 2015: Echo (Triogram)

Within Pitsj

- 2008: Edvard Grieg in Jazz Mood (Universal Music), with Kjell Karlsen ("I Dovregubbens hall")
- 2009: Gjenfortellinger (Grappa Music)
- 2014: Snow Is Falling (Grappa Music)

Within «Eplemöya Songlag»

- 2010: Eplemöya Songlag (NorCD)
- 2012: Möya Og Myten (NorCD)

EP

- 2012: Glorious People

=== Collaborations ===
Within Johndoe

- 2000: Explosift! (D'sign Records)

Within Lumsk

- 2005: Troll (Tabu Recordings)

With «Northern Arc»

- 2012: Northern Arc (Curling Legs)
