= Jannike Kruse =

Norwegian singer, artist and actor (born 1975)

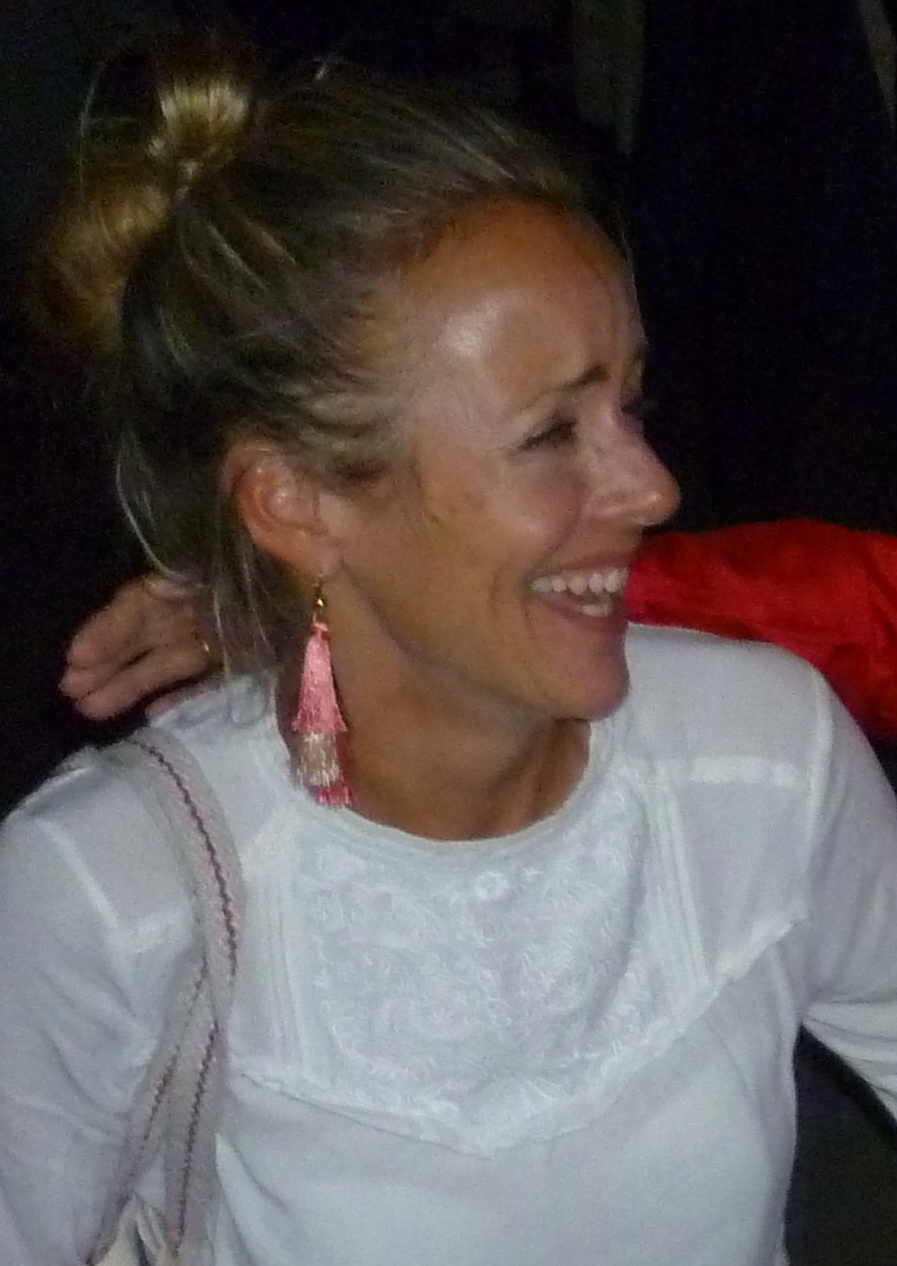
- Kruse in 2016.
- Born: Jannike Kruse; 16 June 1975 (age 51); Oslo, Norway
- Known for: Singer, artist, actor
- Spouse: André Jåtog

Jannike Kruse (born 16 June 1975) is a Norwegian singer, artist and actor. Daughter of Professor and composer Bjørn Howard Kruse and Professor and author Gro Shetelig, sister of Anine and Benedikte Kruse known from the vocal group Pitsj, niece to Philip Antony Kruse and grand child of Colonel Erling Kruse, as well as teacher in music and piano Else Grieg Shetelig.

== Career ==
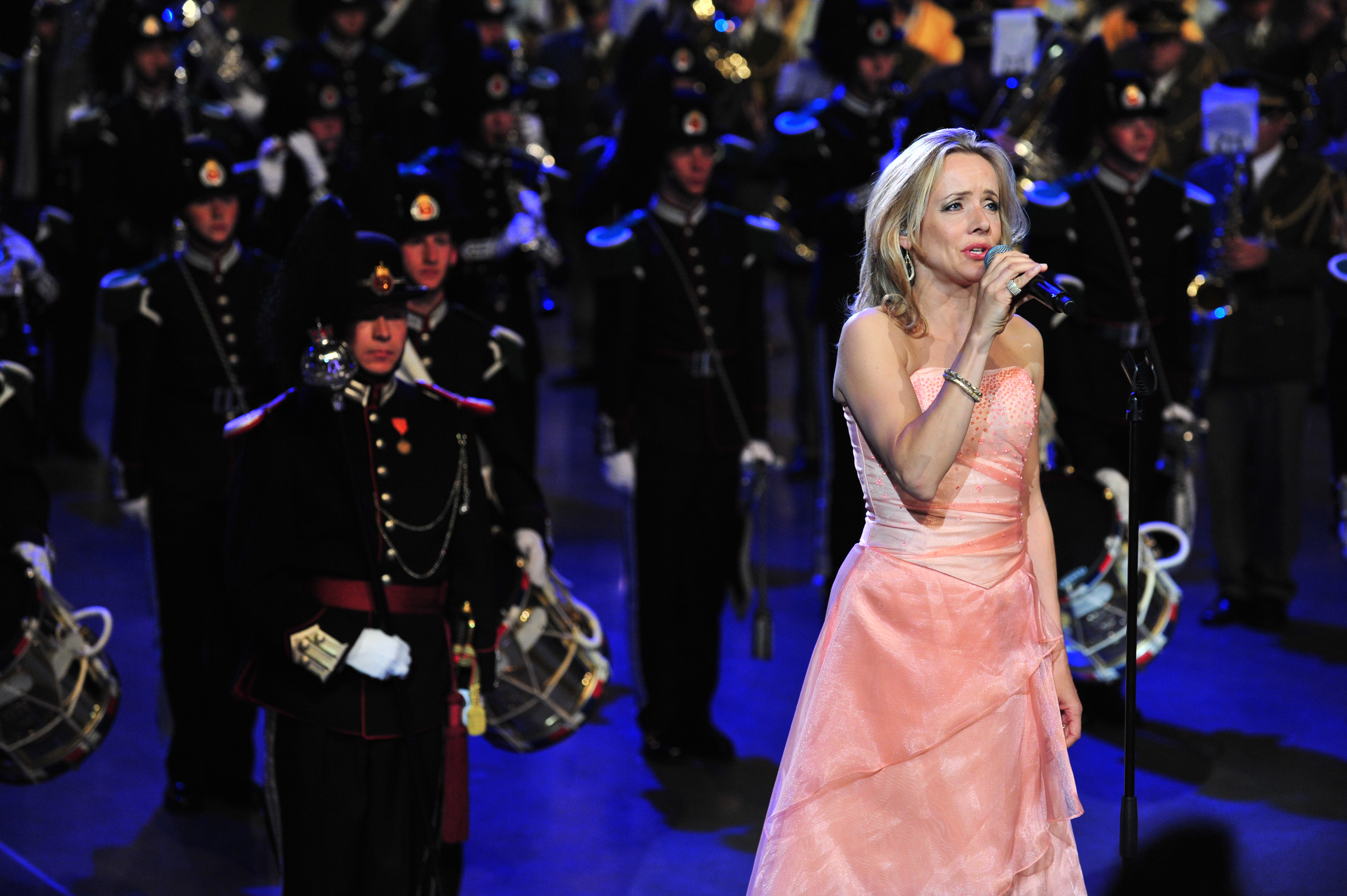
Kruse live with His Majesty the King's Guard of Norway 12 November 2013.

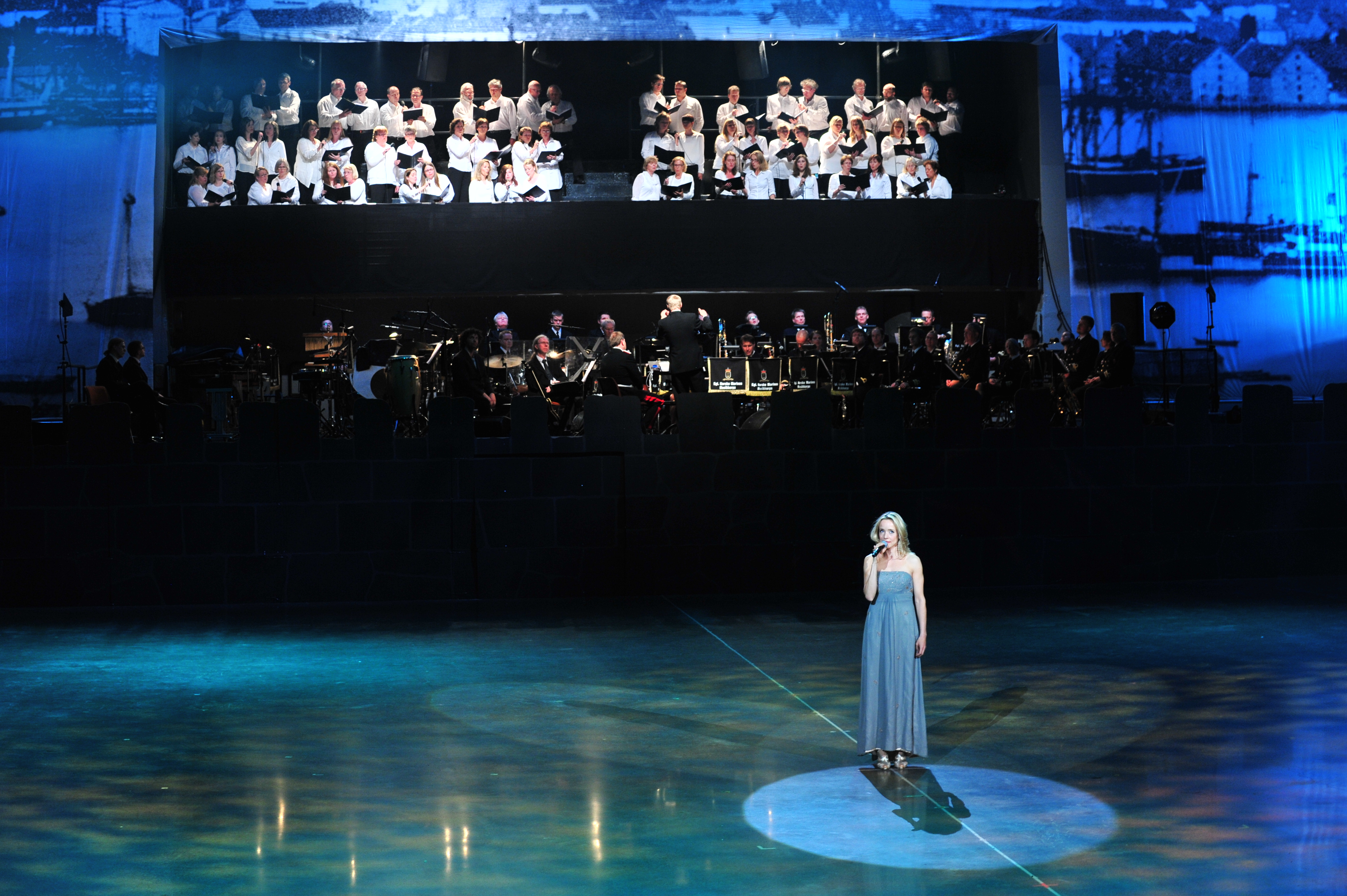
Kruse performed several selections during the Tattoo, 10 May 2012.

Kruse was born in Oslo and started playing the piano at the age of 6. She sang in NRK's Girls' Choir, danced ballet, and joined Elisabeth Gordings Barne- og Ungdomsteaterskole while at primary school. She joined the music program at Foss videregående skole in Oslo 1991. She got the main role of Sonja in the play Reisen til Julestjernen at the Nationaltheatret in Oslo 1993, becoming the youngest Sonia ever at the Nationaltheatret. She continued to play the role in 1994, before starting studies in music pedagogy and singing at Norges Musikkhøgskole in 1995. She applied for Artisten in Gothenburg (Högskolan för Teater, Opera och Musikal), and earned a bachelor there in 2001. Before ending her studies at Artisten, she got the role as Annie Oakley in the musical Annie Get Your Gun at Riksteatret, coming up the next season (2002). Meanwhile, (in 2001) she played the title role in the newly written Den syngende Frk Detektiv in Fredrikstad, and played a part in the success series Nissene på låven on TV Norge.

Kruse has played several main roles and some minor roles at different theaters in Norway, among them Reisen til Julestjernen, Hair (Det Norske Teatret), Fame, Annie get your gun (Riksteatret og Trøndelag Teater), Den syngende Frøken Detektiv (Oslo Nye Teater), Keisaren av Portugalia, Musical Musikal! (Det Norske Teatret), and Spellemann på taket (Fiddler on the roof) at Oslo Nye Teater with among others Dennis Storhøi and Alexander Rybak as co-acters. She was trained at Norwegian College Music in Oslo, and College Theater in Gothenburg. She has also contributed in different TV series and some motion pictures, as well as given voice to a series of well known cartoon characters in Norwegian version. Kruse has performed with many big orchestras and choirs around the world. She has also done some dubbing jobs.

In December 2001 she was one of the fictive participant Marthe in the Christmas calendar series Nissene på låven (TV Norge). She played a minor part in the TV series Det var en gang et eventyr on NRK1 2008, and did at the same period takes for a TV series by Nordisk Film of one of Unni Lindells books about Cato Isaksen. Here she played a main character as Police investigator Randi Johansen. In 2010 she played the character Merete in the comedy film A Somewhat Gentle Man, directed by Hans Petter Moland and with Stellan Skarsgård as Ulrik.

Lately Kruse Jåtog has done some acting at Agder Teater with more modern pieces. She recently played the role as Annika Brennhagen, in NRK s success drama series "Hjem" (means Home), in 16 episodes (2 seasons) of 45 mins each.

Her debut album as a solo singer artist was the record Jannike Kruse – Med Andre Ord, 2009. She has been joined by, among others, the text writers Jan Eggum, Ingrid Bjørnov, Anita Skorgan and Silje Nergaard, and she has even dared to show off her own songs and lyrics – in Norwegian. In 2005 she made an album with children's songs, Kjente, kjære og noen glemte barnesanger, with Forsvarets musikkorps Trøndelag.

== Discography ==
- 2004: Kjente, Kjære Og Noen Glemte Barnesanger (Barneselskapet), with Forsvarets Musikkorps Trøndelag
- 2009: Med Andre Ord (DnC)

== Filmography ==
=== Cinema ===
- Tommelise as Tommelise (1994)
- Klippan i livet as Solveig (NRK, 2006)
- Marias menn as Birgitte (2006)
- Kalde føtter as Kjersti (2006)
- En ganske snill mann as Merete (Paradox, 2010)

=== Television ===
- Nissene på låven as Marthe Lønn-Arnesen (TV Norge, 24 episodes, 2001)
- Uti vår hage (NRK, with Atle Antonsen, Harald Eia and Bård Tufte Johansen, 2003)
- Drømmefangeren as Randi Johansen (NRK, 2005)
- Slangebæreren as Randi Johansen (NRK, 2005)
- Seks som oss as Ungt par (1 episode, 2005)
- Sørgekåpen as Randi Johansen (NRK, 2007)
- Nattsøsteren as Randi Johansen (NRK, 2007)
- Honningfellen as Randi Johansen (NRK, 2008)
- Orkestergraven as Randi Johansen (NRK, 2009)
