= Gjenfortellinger =

2009 studio album

Studio album by Anine Kruse Skatrud Benedikte Kruse Ane Carmen Roggen Ida Roggen, Anja Eline Skybakmoen
- Released: 2009
- Genre: Jazz
- Length: 45.08
- Label: Grappa Music
- Producer: Morten Halle

Pitsj chronology
| Pitsj (2006) | Gjenfortellinger (2009) | Snow Is Falling (2014) |

Gjenfortellinger with Pitsj is a jazz a cappella album. It was released in 2009 on Grappa Music (GRCD 4317).

== Track listing ==
1. «Fanteguten» (4:07)
  (Trad / Arr.: Sverre Indris Joner)
2. «Skjøre / Fragile» (3:27)
  (Sting /Norsk lyrics: Kjell Inge Torgersen / Arr.: Pitsj)
3. «Her igjen / Outra vez» (3:37)
  (Antonio Carlos Jobim / Norsk lyrics: Lars Lillo-Stenberg / Arr.: Ane Carmen Roggen)
4. «Den andre kvinnen / The other woman» (3:21)
  (Jessie Mae Robinson / Norwegian lyrics: Anja Eline Skybakmoen & Ida Roggen / Arr.: Anja Eline Skybakmoen)
5. «Lerkefugl / Ladybird» (3:07)
  (Ted Dameron / Norsk lyrics: Eilev Groven Myhren & Ida Roggen / Arr.: Helge Sunde)
6. «Sofistikerte frøken / Sophisticated lady» (3:32)
  (Mitchell Parish/Duke Ellington/Irving Mills / Norwegian lyrics: Tora Augestad / Arr.: Eyolf Dale)
7. «Det var en gang / Long ago and far away» (3:23)
  (James Taylor / Norwegian lyrics: Kjell Inge Torgersen / Arr.: Anine Kruse Skatrud)
8. «Sjå der kor ho flyr / The moon is a harsh mistress» (4:01)
  (Jimmy Webb / Norwegian lyrics: Kjell Inge Torgersen / Arr.: Ane Carmen Roggen)
9. «Forventning» (3:04)
  (Hege Øygaren/Vigleik Storaas / Arr.: Wenche Losnegård)
10. «Besatt, blendet og besnæret / Bewitched, bothered and bewildered» (5:03)
  (Lorenz Hart/Richard Rodgers / Norwegian lyrics: Ida Roggen & Toni Herlofson / Arr.: Bjørn Kruse)
11. «Verden av i går / Ordinary world» (4:29)
  (Duran Duran / Norwegian lyrics: Ida Roggen / Arr.: Lars Andreas Aspesæter)
12. «Bruremarsj fra Sørfold» (3:53)
  (Trad. / Arr.: Marius Løken)

== Credits ==
- Vocals: Anine Kruse, Benedikte Kruse, Ane Carmen Roggen, Ida Roggen and Anja Eline Skybakmoen
- Producer: Morten Halle
- Art direction: Anorak
- Sound engineer: Vidar Lunden
- Mastering: Giert Clausen
- Mixing: Morten Halle, Vidar Lunden
- Cover photo: Steffen Aarberg Aaland

== Notes ==
- Recorded at Musikkloftet in May and June 2009
- Mastered at Fersk Lyd
