= Monica Mancini =

Italian-American singer

- Born: May 4, 1952 (age 74); Italy
- Genre: jazz
- Occupation: singer
- Label: Concord Jazz
- Website: monicamancini.com

Monica Jo Mancini (born May 4, 1952) is an American singer, primarily jazz, and the daughter of composer Henry Mancini.

== Early life and education ==
Monica Mancini grew up in the Northridge neighborhood of Los Angeles, California. Her father, Henry, was a popular, award-winning composer; and her mother, Virginia, was a singer.

Monica listened to the Beatles more than to her father's music.

== Career ==
When she was fourteen, she sang professionally with the Henry Mancini Chorus, as did her mother and sister. She became a freelance studio singer in Los Angeles.

Her debut album, Monica Mancini (1998) was accompanied by a television special on PBS television.

During her career, she has worked with Plácido Domingo, Quincy Jones, and Michael Jackson.

== Discography ==
- Monica Mancini (Warner Bros., 1998)
- Dreams of Johnny Mercer (Concord Jazz, 2000)
- Cinema Paradiso (Concord Jazz, 2002)
- Ultimate Mancini (2004)
- I've Loved These Days (Concord, 2009)

== Personal life ==
Monica Mancini is married to musician and producer Gregg Field.

== See also ==
- List of American musicians
- List of jazz singers
- List of people from Los Angeles
- List of session musicians
