= Anine Kruse =

Norwegian musician and choral conductor

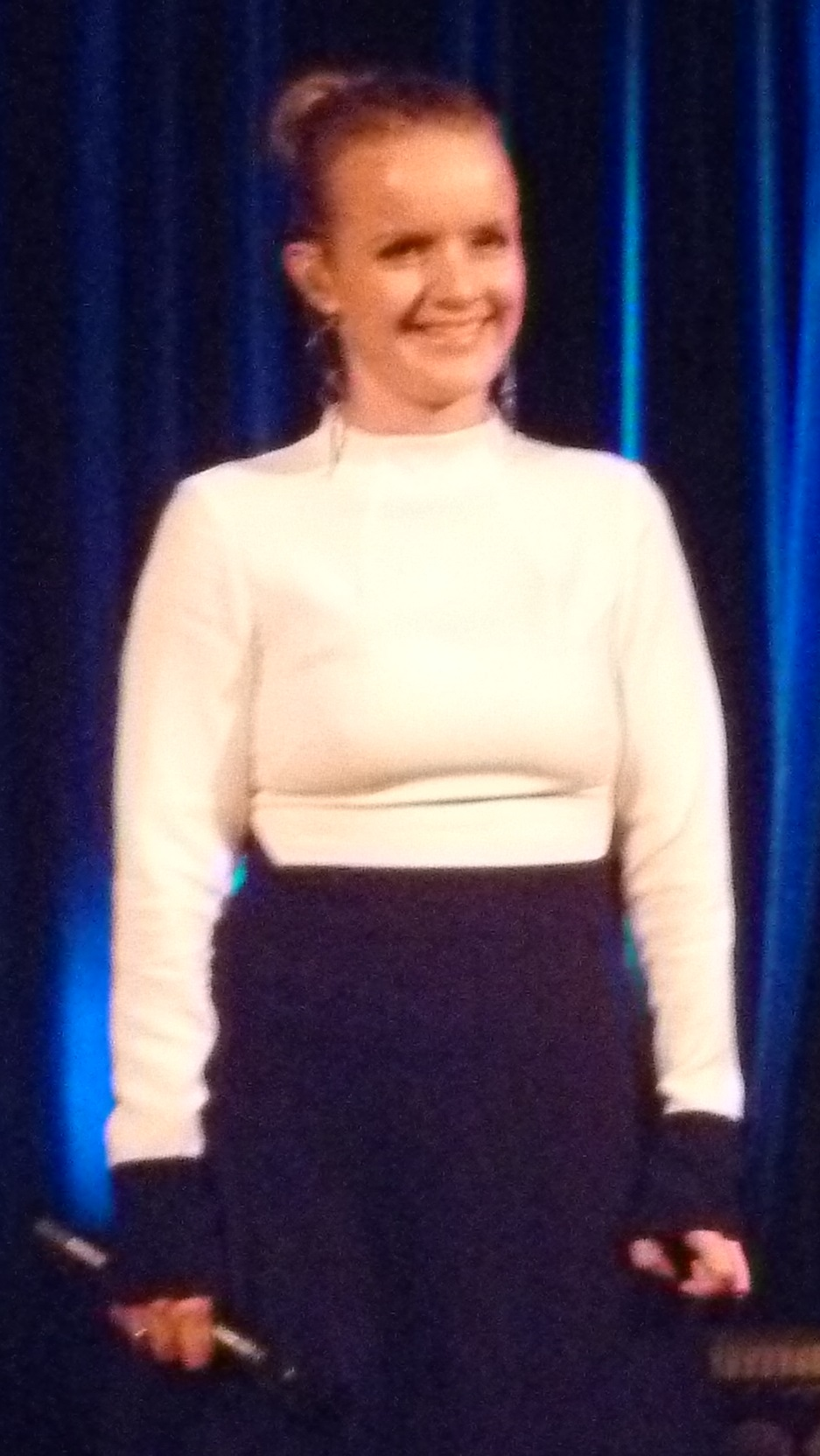
- Kruse with Pitsj at Ingensteds September 10, 2016.
- Born: Anine Susanne Kruse; 1 November 1977 (age 48); Oslo, Norway
- Occupations: Singer, choral conductor
- Organizations: Pitsj
- Website: pitsj.no

Anine Susanne Kruse Skatrud (born 1 November 1977) is a Norwegian musician and choral conductor, the daughter of Professor of Music Gro Shetelig and the composer Bjørn Kruse, sister of actress and singers Jannike and Benedikte Kruse, and married to trombonist and bandleader Even Skatrud Andersen.

== Career ==
Born in Oslo, Kruse studied music at Foss videregående skole before she attended the Norwegian Academy of Music. Here she got her diploma as choral conductor and singer, and after ten years of studies and as lecturer at the Academy, she soon (2014) get her master's degree in Conducting.

Together with her sister Benedikte Kruse, Anja Eline Skybakmoen, Ane Carmen Roggen and Ida Roggen, Kruse comprices the vocal group Pitsj.

In 2011 she performed the collaborative concert Pitsj & Gumbo in Oslo Concert Hall, where "A capella møter en hot New Orleans-rett". She has also sung within Det Norske Solistkor, World Youth Choir and World Chamber Choir, and in addition conducts the choir Bærum Vocal Ensemble.

== Discography ==
- 1992: Wenches Jul (CNR) with Wenche Myhre
- 1996: Gagarin – En Romfartsopera (Hemera) with Håkon Berge
- 2006: Pitsj (Grappa) with Pitsj
- 2006: Mylder (Richie Rich's Salsa House, with Jan-Tore Saltnes
- 2009: Gjenfortellinger (Grappa) with Pitsj
- 2009: Edvard Grieg in Jazz Mood (Universal, 2009) with Pitsj & Kjell Karlsen ("I Dovregubbens hall")
- 2009: Med Andre Ord (DnC) with Jannike Kruse
- 2014: Snow Is Falling (Grappa)
