= Børge-Are Halvorsen =

Norwegian jazz musician (born 1978)

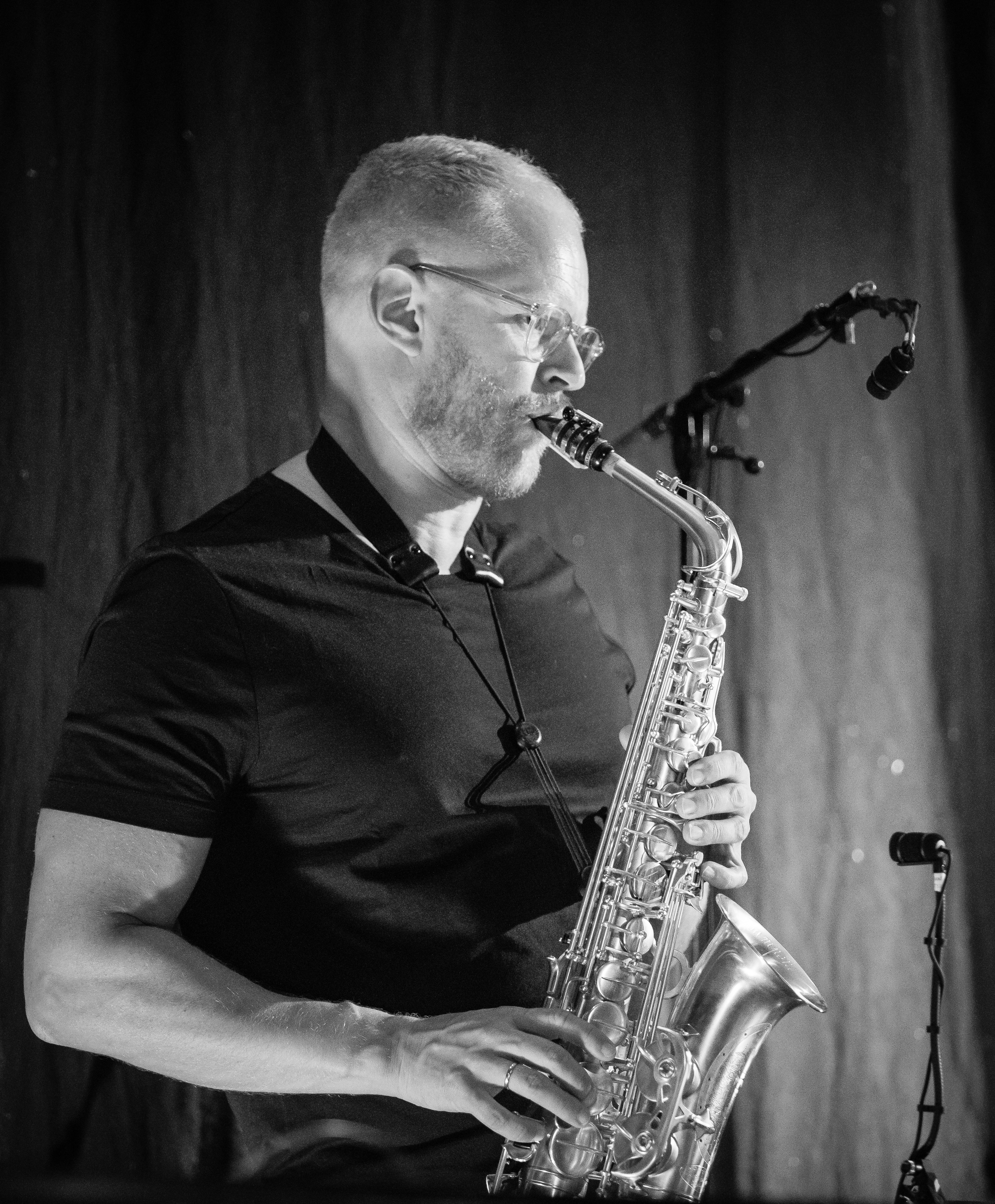

Background information
- Born: 12 October 1978 (age 48); Lillehammer, Norway
- Origin: Norway
- Genre: Jazz
- Occupations: Musician, band leader, composer, saxophonist
- Instrument: Saxophones

Børge-Are Halvorsen (born 12 October 1978 in Lillehammer, Norway) is a Norwegian Jazz musician (soprano, alto, tenor and baritone saxophone and c- and alto flute). His family moved to Sandane in Gloppen Municipality where he spent his youth, but he was later a freelance musician resident of Oslo since 2003.

== Career ==
Halvorsen studied music at Firda vidaregåande skule (1994–97), then at "Viken Folkehøgskole" (1997–98) and at last on the Department of Music, Rhythmic studies at Universitetet i Agder (1998-02). Since 2006 he has been engaged as Lecturer in saxophone and jazz improvisation at Norges Musikkhøgskole, since 2010 also at Department of Musicology Universitetet i Oslo. He also works as an arranger, much in connection with horn section or big band.

Halvorsen plays with "Ensemble Denada", "Examination of What", Ole Børud, "Ekvilibrium", "Vinni", "Penthouse Playboys", "Hans Orkester", "Steffen Isaksens Orkester", "KABA Orchestra" and "Jon Haaland Big Band". Has also appeared in the bands Paperboys, Dance with a Stranger, Karpe Diem, Sharp Nine, "Smiths Venner", Jens Wendelboe Crazy Energy Orchestra, "Mathilde Grooss Viddal/FriEnsemblet", Kjell Karlsens Orkester, "Bjørn W W Jørgensen Storband", Chipahua, The New Swing Generation, "The Fabulous Couldhavebeens", "The New Jordal Swingers", "Soulslave", The Sinatra Songbook, "Soul, Inc.", "Soul Insurance" and "Earplay", and is also musical director of the Big Band "Bjørvika Business Band" since 2010.

== Musicals / show (in selection) ==
Halvorsen has participated on the following productions:

- 2003–05: Hjertelig hilsen Hege og Kjersti, Dizzie Showteater/norgesturné
- 2004: 80-tallet Beat for Bit, Edderkoppen
- 2005: The Show, Edderkoppen/Oseberg Kulturhus
- 2006: Laides' Night, Edderkoppen
- 2006: En kveld med Thomas og Harald... og Yngvar, norgesturné
- 2006: It's Showtime, Chat Noir/Drammen Teater/Oseberg Kulturhus
- 2007–08: Showgirls, Chat Noir/Sandefjord
- 2007: Svindlere med stil, Chateau Neuf
- 2008: Grease, Oslo Spektrum
- 2008: Singin' In The Rain, Oslo Nye
- 2009: Vår Jul (Cecilia Vennersten/Christian Ingebrigtsen), norgesturné
- 2009: Cats, Chat Noir, Oslo
- 2009: Les Misérables, Oslo Nye
- 2010: Swingin' Home For Christmas (Alexander Rybak), norgesturné
- 2010: Kåre, Linn, men Christian Skolmen, Chat Noir
- 2010: Spellemenn, Klubben, Tønsberg
- 2011: Øivind Blunck – Rett og slett, Dizzie Showteater
- 2011: Ungen, Sandvika Teater
- 2012: Spamalot, Folketeateret, Oslo

== Television productions (in selection) ==
Halvorsen has contributed musically to the following productions:

- UMOJA – The Cultural Flying Carpet (African Broadcasting Union)
- UMOJA – The Cultural Flying Carpet (NRK)
- Først og sist med Skavlan (NRK)
- Sommeråpent (NRK)
- Grosvold (NRK)
- Store Studio (NRK)
- Memo (NRK)
- God Morgen, Norge (TV2)
- Senkveld (TV2)
- Idrettsgallaen (NRK)
- Skal Vi Danse (TV2)
- Artistgallaen (TV2)
- TV-aksjonen (NRK)
- 17. mai-konsert fra Rådhusplassen (TV2)
- UNICEFs Lattergalla (TVNorge)
- Gullfisken (TV2)
- X-Factor (TV2)
- Idol (TV2)
- Erobreren (NRK)
- Kvelden er din (TV2)
- Torsdag kveld fra Nydalen (TV2)
- Allsang på Grensen (TV2)
- Momarkedet (NRK/TV2)
- Komiprisen (NRK)
- Nobel Peace Prize Concert (NRK)
- Lilyhammer (NRK)
- Bye & Rønning (NRK)
- Asbjørn Brekke Show (TVNorge)

== Discography (in selection) ==
Halvorsen has contributed to the following releases:

- 2004: Soria Moria, with Nissa Nyberget & Elisabeth Lindland, nominated for the 2004 children music Spellemannprisen
- 2004: Falkner Street, with Number Seven Deli
- 2004: Bigbandblast!, with Børre Dalhaug, nominated for the 2004 jazz Spellemannprisen
- 2005: God Dag, with Kåre Conradi
- 2005: Love Will Haunt You Down, with The Margarets
- 2005: Birdie Blues, with Hilde Louise Asbjørnsen
- 2005: Closer, with Beady Belle
- 2006: Denada, Norske Store Orkester/Helge Sunde, nominated for the 2006 jazz Spellemannprisen
- 2006: When Worlds Collide, with Paperboys
- 2006: Matsukaze, with Håkon Storm
- 2006: Big Band, with EvenEven
- 2006: Seconds, with Number Seven Deli
- 2007: Hjerteknuser, with Jan Eggum, nominated for the 2007 male artist Spellemannprisen
- 2007: Sudoku, with Sharp Nine, nominated for the 2007 jazz Spellemannprisen
- 2007: It's Beginning To Look A Lot Like Christmas, with Marian Aas Hansen
- 2007: Catfish Row, with Ornand Altenburg
- 2007: While I Walk You Home, with Dylan Mondegreen
- 2007: Antonsen Big Band, with Antonsen Big Band
- 2007: Eg veit i himmerik ei borg, with Jan Werner
- 2008: Elske I Sneen, with Penthouse Playboys
- 2008: Hold on Be Strong, with Maria Haukaas Storeng
- 2008: True Colours, with Erlend Bratland, nominated for the 2008 newcomer Spellemannprisen
- 2008: Shakin' The Ground, with Ole Børud
- 2008: Twenty Years Erased, with The Margarets
- 2008: Pappa, ikke gå så fort..., with Axel Hellstenius
- 2008: Sidelengs, with Ole Dørje
- 2008: Nikken, with Nicolay Leganger
- 2009: Finding Nymo, with Ensemble Denada, awarded ECHO Preis for this Year's big band album, by German record company organisation
- 2009: The Oslo Agreement, within Paperboys
- 2009: Edvard Grieg In Jazz Mood, with Kjell Karlsen Big Band
- 2009: Come Closer, with FriEnsemblet
- 2009: Vagabond, with Vagabond
- 2010: Spinning Wheel, with Swinglett
- 2010: Dråpe, with Maria Mohn
- 2010: Sweet Freedom, with Ingrid Kjosavik
- 2010: Neste stasjon Grorud, with Finn Kalvik & Erik Fosnes Hansen
- 2010: The Best of Me Is You, with Heine Totland (single)
- 2011: Examination of What (Losen Records), with Håvard Fossum Børge-Are Halvorsen Qrt
- 2011: Visa vid vindens ängar, with Alexander Rybak
- 2011: Hope Is Happiness, with Hilde Dahl
- 2011: Løvlands Allé, with Løvlands Allé
- 2011: Rikki's Guns, with Rikke Normann
- 2011: No More Than Necessary, with The Douglas Group
- 2011: For Your Soul, with Jens Andreas Kleiven
- 2011: Keep Movin', with Ole Børud
- 2011: Little Brother – Out of the Pit, with Rune Brodahl
- 2012: Hølå, with Rune Berg
- 2012: Dylan Mondegreen, with Dylan Mondegreen
- 2012: La Guinéenne, with Mory Kante
- 2012: Undergroove, with FriEnsemblet
- 2013: 20 År Midt I Musikken - Hit'er & Favoritter - Live (Da Works), with Trine Rein
- 2014: Sources Of Inspiration (AMP Music & Records), with Anders Thorén Quartet -
- 2014: I Go To The Rock (TAMU), with Oslo Gospel Choir
- 2015: Bass Detector (Ozella), with Jens Fossum
- 2015: Molok (Kscope), with Gazpacho
- 2015: Salsa Til Folket! (Grappa), with Hovedøen Social Club
- 2017: The Musical Messiah (TAMU), with Oslo Gospel Choir
- 2018: I Am Awake, with John Faxe
