= Håvard Fossum =

Norwegian jazz musician, composer and arranger

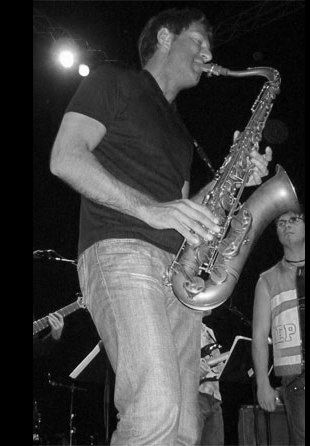
- Håvard Fossum

Background information
- Born: June 7, 1971 (age 55); Trondheim, Trøndelag
- Origin: Norway, Oslo
- Occupations: Musician, composer
- Instruments: Saxophone, flute
- Years active: 1996–present

Håvard Fossum (born 7 June 1971 in Trondheim, Norway) is a Norwegian jazz musician (saxophone and flute), composer and arranger, situated in Oslo since January 2000. He is known from a series of recordings and cooperations with the likesog Tommy Dorsey, John Surman, Staffan William-Olsson, Jens Wendelboe, Anders Aarum and Jarle Vespestad.

== Career ==
Fossum holds a Bachelor's degree from the Jazz program at Trondheim Musikkonservatorium (NTNU, 1989–92), and a Master's degree in Jazz Saxophone Performance from the Frost School of Music at the University of Miami in Florida. Here he studied composition and arranging with Ron Miller ("Modal Jazz Composing and Arranging, Vol I & Vol II") and Gary Lindsay ("Jazz Arranging Techniques"). Fossum was awarded a grant of US$16 000,- by the "Norge-Amerika Foreningen" to take this education. After finishing his music studies in 1998, Fossum worked as a freelance musician in Miami for a year. It may be mentioned that in February–March 1999 he joined the Tommy Dorsey Orchestra on tour for two months.

He was nominated for the Spellemannprisen 2007 in the class Jazz for the album F.A.Q. - Frequently Asked Questions, within the Fossum-Aarum Quartet. The band comprises his brother Jens Fossum (double bass), Anders Aarum (piano) and Jarle Vespestad (drums).

Fossum plays within several both big bands and smaller bands like Funky Butt, "The Sinatra Songbook", "Kaba Orchestra", Halvard Kausland/Helle Brunvoll Septet, "Cannonballs" (including Eckhard Baur), "The New Swing Generation", "Inge Stangvik Quintet", John Surman's "Rainbow Studio Band", Erling Wicklund's "Take Five", Marvin Charles, "Lars Erik Gudim's Big Band", Jens Wendelboe's "Crazy Energy Orchestra", "Norske Store Orkester For Jazz", "Sharp Nine" (Staffan William-Olsson), Børre Dalhaug's BigBandBlast! and "Bunch Of Chops". As a freelance musician he has been involved in many TV shows.

Fossum is also a well recognized arranger and composer, and has written scars on various television shows, like "Skal Vi Danse" and "Drømmerollen", theater, jazz ensembles, big band, concert band / wind band, choir, jazz ensemble and a variety of events and concerts. Especially in big band format, he has an extensive production with a significant number of original compositions for artists and bands like Heine Totland, "Forsvarets Musikkorps/storband", "Det Norske Blåseensemble", Bergen Big Band, Julie Dahle Aagård, "Ett Fett Storband", "Sandvika Big Band", "Store Norske Orkester For Jazz", Kjell Karlsen's Orchestra, "Lars Erik Gudim's Big Band" and "Trøndelag Teater".

In 2007 he presented "Fossum Experience" with Julie Dahle Aagård as special guest, at the club "Herr Nilsen" in Oslo, and was saxophone soloist with Bill Champlin from the legendary band Chicago and Kringkastingsorkesteret (KORK) in 2010.

In 2011 he released the album Examination Of What within Håvard Fossum/Børge-Are Halvorsen Quartet, (including his brother Jens and Håkon Mjåset Johansen.

== Discography ==
Within the Fossum-Aarum Quartet

- 2006: F.A.Q. - Frequently Asked Questions, within the Fossum-Aarum Quartet (Schmell Records)

Within Håvard Fossum/Børge-Are Halvorsen Quartet

- 2011: Examination Of What (Losen Records), with Børge-Are Halvorsen

Other projects

- 1993: Gi Akt! (Sonet), within H.M. the King's Guard Band as arranger & leader
- 2009: Red (Ozella), with Randi Tytingvåg
- 2011: The Rainbow Band Sessions (Losen Records), with John Surman's Rainbow Band
