= Ulstrup =

Ulstrup is a Norwegian surname. Notable people with the surname include:

- Arnt Severin Ulstrup (1862–1922), Norwegian physician and politician
- Åshild Ulstrup (born 1934), Norwegian journalist
