= Mitchell Coleman Jr. =

American bassist

Mitchell Coleman Jr. is a bassist and session musician with jazz fusion and R&B.

== Early life and career ==
Coleman was born in Meridian, Mississippi and spent his early years in Cuba, Alabama. In 1990 he started his music career after high school by joining United States Air Force Band. He studied privately with bassists Rick Montalbano and George Sessum and toured with the Tops in Blue band.

Coleman released his debut solo album, Soul Searching in 2014 which was ranked at #13 on Billboard in 2015.

In 2016 he released his debut CD, Perception.

In August 2017 his album ''Gravity was'' released independently on Mitchell’s own Soul Revelations Records label.

== Discography ==
=== Albums ===
- Soul Searching
- Perception
- Gravity

=== Singles ===
- Passport ( #39 on the Mediabase Smooth A/C Chart, #41 on the Radio Wave Internet Airplay Chart, 2015)
- Flow ( #25 on the tastemaker SmoothJazz Radar chart, 2015)
- Secrets
- Enchanted Summer
- I Can’t Help It
- Euphoria (#37 on Radio Wave)
- Twilight
- Transcendence

== See also ==
- List of session musicians
