= Nomadesongar =

2004 Norwegian folk music album

Studio album by Lars Klevstrand Ingeborg Hungnes Ane Carmen Roggen Benedikte Kruse Jan-Tore Saltnes Svein Korshamn Bjørn Klakegg Rune Klakegg Frode Berg Harald Skullerud
- Released: 2004
- Genre: Folk music
- Length: 39:26
- Label: Tylden & Co

Nomadesongar (released 2004 in Oslo, Norway by the label Tylden & Co – GTACD 8263) is a music album with the Norwegian folk singer Lars Klevstrand.

== Personnel ==
- Vocals, Guitar – Lars Klevstrand
- Vocals – Ingeborg Hungnes
- Choir – Ane Carmen Roggen, Benedikte Kruse, Jan-Tore Saltnes & Svein Korshamn
- Guitar – Bjørn Klakegg
- Keyboards & horns – Rune Klakegg
- Bass – Frode Berg
- Percussion – Harald Skullerud

== Track listing ==
1. «Ordtøke-gåter» (3:10)
2. «1981, vinter» (3:21)
3. «Ballade» (2:25)
4. «Og kanskje I» (2:37)
5. «Azteker» (2:41)
6. «Liten skopussar» (2:21)
7. «Vise om brua i Avignon» (2:58)
8. «Emily Dickinson» (2:52)
9. «Segn» (3:15)
10. «Folkevise» (2:51)
11. «Og kanskje II» (1:54)
12. «Vinterhuset» (2:28)
13. «Voggesong» (4:13)
14. «Vise» (2:20)

== Credits ==
- RBG - cover design
- Leif Johansen - edition (sound design)
- Åse-Marie Nesse - lyrics
- Henrik Jonsson - mastering
- Lars Klevstrand - musical arrangements, production, liner notes
- Anne Lise Flavik, Torunn Nilsen - photographes
