= Svetlana Shmulyian =

Russian-born American jazz singer, bandleader, producer, and educator

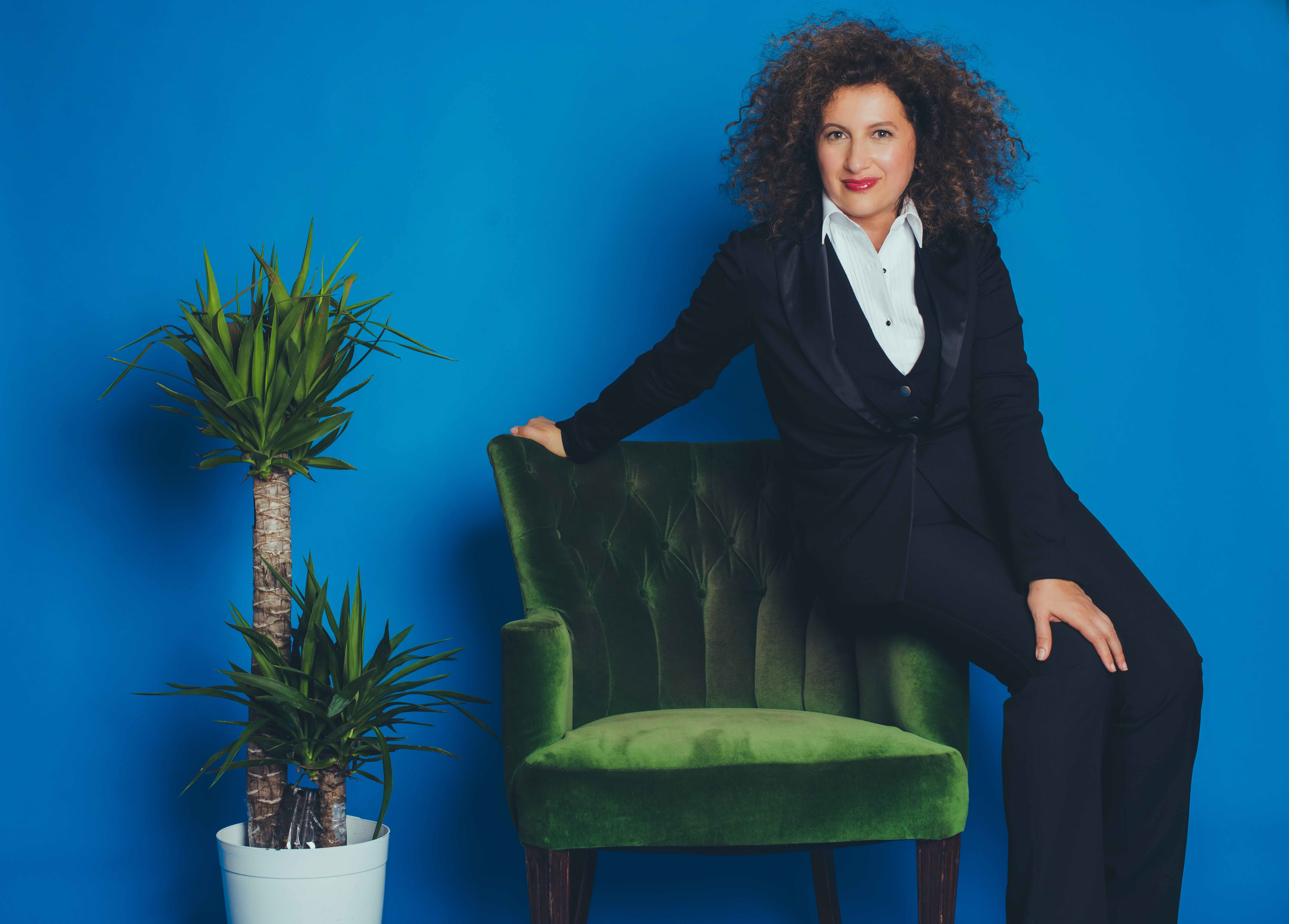

Background information
- Born: Moscow, Russia
- Genres: Jazz
- Occupation(s): Singer; bandleader; songwriter; producer; educator
- Years active: 2010s–present
- Labels: OA2 Records; Starr Records
- Website: www.svetlanajazz.com • www.swingmakesyousing.com

Svetlana Shmulyian (professionally: Svetlana) is a Russian-born, New York–based jazz vocalist, bandleader, producer, and educator. She leads the ensembles Svetlana & the Delancey Five, Svetlana's New York Collective, and Svetlana's Big Band. Her work has been featured at the Kennedy Center and Carnegie Hall. She is an adjunct associate professor at Teachers College, Columbia University. A 2022 NY1 feature notes she holds a PhD from Columbia University.

== Early life and education ==
Shmulyian was born in Moscow. She earned a bachelor's degree in Mathematics in Moscow before moving to the United States. She later received a master's degree in Nonprofit Management from The New School, a master’s degree in Jazz Performance from the Manhattan School of Music, and a PhD in Organizational Psychology from Columbia University. She has been associated with Teachers College, Columbia University in Social-Organizational Psychology. Before embarking on a full-time career in music, Shmulyian worked as a management consultant in the private sector and as a lecturer at New York University and Columbia University, teaching courses in management research methods and statistics.

== Career ==
=== Back Room residency and New York projects ===
Shmulyian began performing in New York jazz clubs in the 2010s and in May 2012 launched a Monday-night residency at The Back Room on the Lower East Side with Svetlana & the Delancey Five. Beyond the quintet, she leads Svetlana's Big Band, which has headlined holiday shows at Birdland and the Blue Note. She also tours and records with Svetlana's New York Collective, presented on the Kennedy Center's Millennium Stage.

=== Recordings ===
Her earliest release was the EP Baby It's Cold Outside (2012), recorded with the Delancey Five. Shmulyian's debut album with the Delancey Five, Night at the Speakeasy (OA2 Records, 2016), featured guest Wycliffe Gordon and received coverage in All About Jazz.

Her second album, Night at the Movies (Starr Records, 2019), drew media attention from WBGO and PopMatters.

Later releases include the holiday EP Snowfall Swing – Live in Savannah! (2024) and Reel to Remix: Night at the Movies Reimagined (2025), which received reviews in PopMatters and UK Jazz News.

=== Grants and residencies ===
Her project Swing Makes You Sing! was a Digital Residency grantee of Chamber Music America in 2021.

She was also awarded a Jazz Road Tours grant from South Arts in 2021 for Svetlana / New York Collective, totaling $14,946. She later received another Jazz Road Tours grant in 2025.

Her projects were also included in New Music USA's Creator Fund (2023) and Organization Fund (2024).

=== Notable performances ===
Shmulyian has performed internationally at the Bahrain Jazz Fest (2024), the Jazz & Villas Festival in Italy (2017), the Tel Aviv Blues Festival (2016), and the Jerusalem Jazz Festival (2018).

In the United States, she has appeared at the Kennedy Center's Millennium Stage, and has headlined festivals including Romanza Festivale of the Arts in Florida and the Bousquet Jazz Festival in Massachusetts. She was also featured at Carnegie Hall in 2025 as part of Family Day: Spring Fest.

== Teaching and other work ==
Shmulyian is an adjunct associate professor at Teachers College, Columbia University (Organization & Leadership). Coverage has also noted her earlier career as a management consultant in the private sector.

== Style and reception ==
Coverage has described Shmulyian's approach as a blend of swing idioms with straight-ahead jazz and singer-songwriter elements, with collaborators including Wycliffe Gordon. WBGO highlighted Night at the Movies and her affinity for cinematic repertoire on Singers Unlimited.

== Discography ==
- Baby It's Cold Outside (2012, EP, with the Delancey Five)
- Night at the Speakeasy (OA2 Records, 2016)
- Night at the Movies (Starr Records, 2019)
- Snowfall Swing – Live in Savannah! (2024)
- Reel to Remix: Night at the Movies Reimagined (2025)

== Selected publications ==
- Schulte, M.; Ostroff, C.; Shmulyian, S.; Kinicki, A. (2009). “Organizational climate configurations: relationships to collective attitudes, customer satisfaction, and financial performance.” Journal of Applied Psychology 94 (3): 618–634. doi:10.1037/a0014365. PMID PMID 19450003.
- Shmulyian, S.; Bateman, B. D.; Philpott, R.; Gulri, N. K. (2010). “Art or Artist? An Analysis of Eight Large-Group Methods for Driving Large-Scale Change.” In: Research in Organizational Change and Development, Vol. 18 (Emerald).

== Awards and honors ==
- Chamber Music America — Digital Residency grantee (2021)
- South Arts — Jazz Road Tours grantee (2021; 2025)
- New Music USA — Creator Fund (2023); Organization Fund (2024)

== See also ==
- List of jazz vocalists
