= Dylan Mondegreen =

Norwegian singer-songwriter

Dylan Mondegreen (born Børge Sildnes) is a Norwegian singer and songwriter. His debut album, While I Walk You Home, was released in his native country on 17 September 2007.

The second album, The World Spins On, was released in 2009. The album was released by Division Records in Norway, Universal Records in the Philippines, Fastcut Records in Japan and Pastel Music in Korea.

Mondegreen released his third and self-titled album in September 2012. Shelflife Records released the album in the United States. AllMusic gave it 4,5/5 stars and called it "a quiet masterpiece ... flawlessly written and performed, and produced with uncommon skill and grace – it's likely one of the best singer/songwriter records of 2012, and most any year that came before". The album was co-produced and mixed by Ian Catt, best known for his work with Saint Etienne.

Mondegreen has played shows in the United States, the United Kingdom, China, Japan, Italy and Norway. He has featured in articles in Pitchfork, NME, Under The Radar, Spin and more.

The surname is based on Lady Mondegreen, a character of myth and legend. Jon Carroll, columnist for the San Francisco Chronicle, periodically runs a story which gives the truth about "Mondegreen". A mondegreen is a mishearing of the lyrics of popular songs. The name itself comes from Carroll's mishearing of a line in a song from his youth, about a valiant man who villains killed "and laid him on the green". He heard this as "Lady Mondegreen". American writer, Sylvia Wright, coined the term in her essay "The Death of Lady Mondegreen," published in Harper's Magazine in November 1954.

His latest album, Every Little Step was released in April 2016. Tim Sendra from AllMusic declared "It's a wonderfully truthful and human record that serves as another compelling bit of evidence in favor of declaring Sildnes one of the best indie pop singer/songwriters around".
