= Ane Carmen Roggen =

Norwegian singer, conductor, and journalist

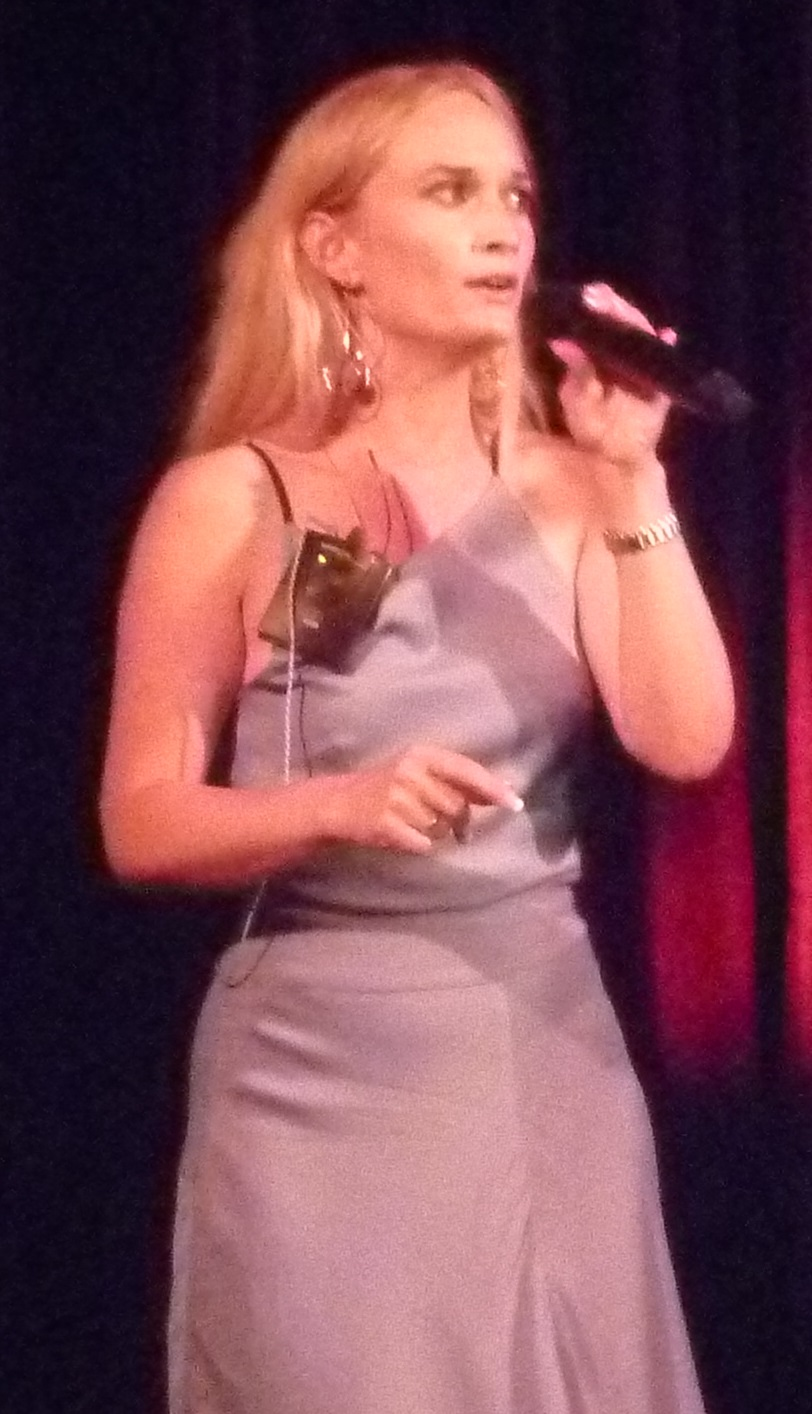
- Roggen with Pitsj at Ingensteds; September 10, 2016

Background information
- Born: Ane Carmen Stuve Roggen; 16 September 1978 (age 47); Oslo, Norway
- Genres: Vocal jazz
- Occupations: Vocalist, conductor, arranger
- Instrument: Vocals
- Member of: Pitsj

Ane Carmen Stuve Roggen (born 16 September 1978) is a Norwegian singer, conductor, arranger, and journalist. She is the younger sister of jazz singer Live Maria Roggen and the twin sister of jazz singer Ida Roggen.

== Education ==
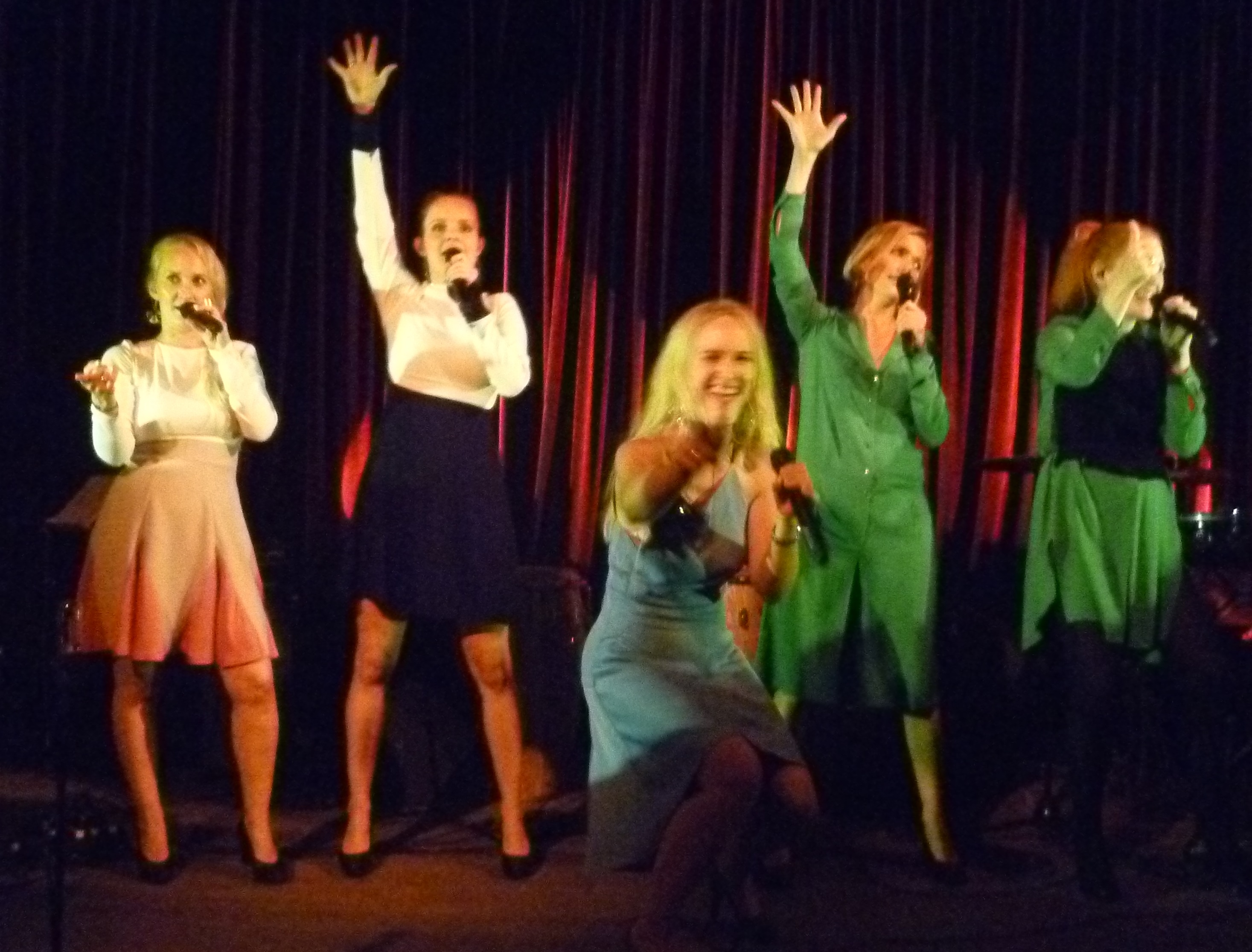
Roggen with Pitsj at Ingensteds September 10, 2016

Roggen attended the music program at Foss videregaende skole and received her Examen artium in 1994. She received a master's degree in musicology from the University of Oslo and wrote the thesis Wayfaring Voices: Discursions into Black Vocal Style in a Norwegian Context (2008). She also studied at CUNY Graduate Center in New York City and Universidad de Guanajuato in Guanajuato, Mexico (2000–01).

== Career ==
Roggen is a producer at Rikskonsertene and became popular in Norway as a member of the vocal group Pitsj. She recorded the album Pitsj (2006), followed by competing in Kjempesjansen at NRK with Tora Augestad, Anine Kruse, Benedikte Kruse and her twin sister Ida. Roggen joined the vocal group Quattro Stagioni for the album Nowell Sing We (2004) followed by a Christmas show in 2006.

== Publications ==
- Ane Carmen Stuve Roggen (2008-11-03). Wayfaring voices: Discursions into Black Vocal Style in a Norwegian Context (Master thesis). University of Oslo. hdl:10852/27177.

== Discography ==
=== As leader ===
With Pitsj

- Pitsj (Grappa, 2006)
- Gjenfortellinger (Grappa, 2009)
- Snow (Grappa, 2014)

=== As guest ===
- Kjell Karlsen, Edvard Grieg in jazz mood (Universal, 2008)
- Lars Klevstrand, Nomadesongar (Grappa, 2004)
- Quattro Stagioni, Nowell Sing We (Pro Musica, 2004)
