= List of session musicians =

This is a list of session musicians – professional musicians who perform in individual sessions rather than being a permanent member of an ensemble. The list, alphabetical by surname, covers those who are especially notable for such work.

== A–M ==
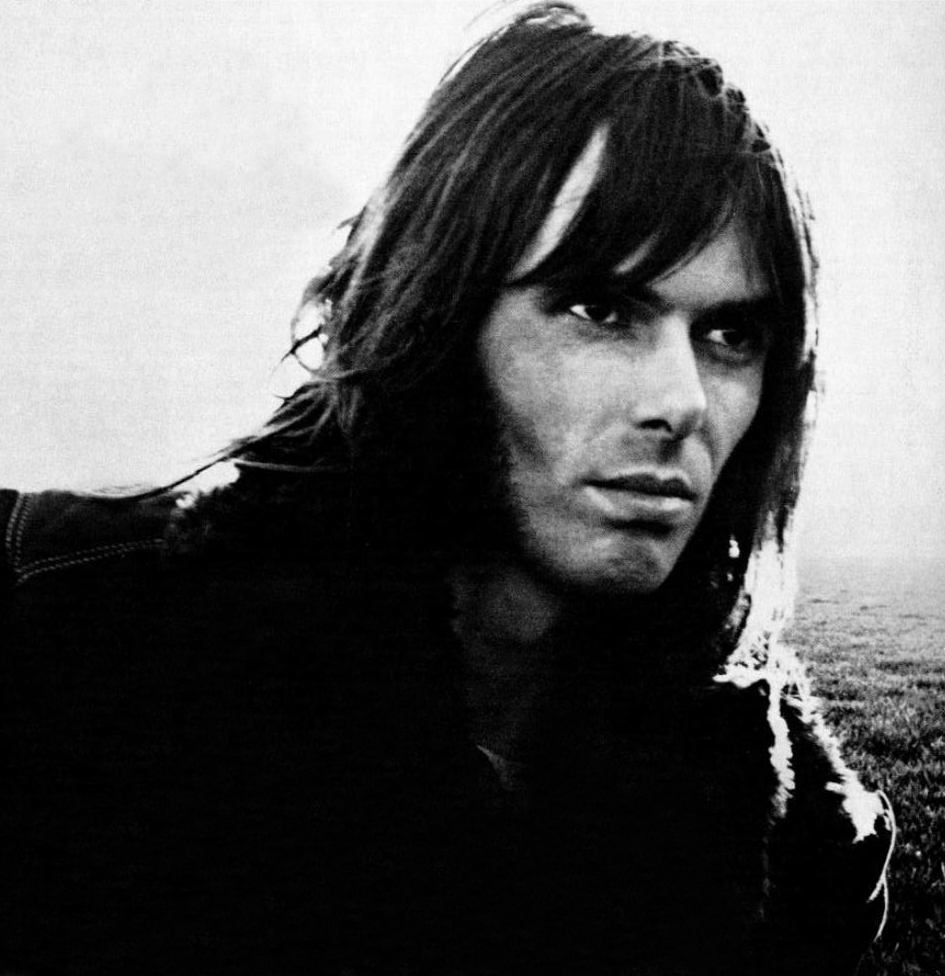
Nicky Hopkins recorded with many bands of the 1960s and 1970s and inspired the Kinks' song "Session Man". (1973)

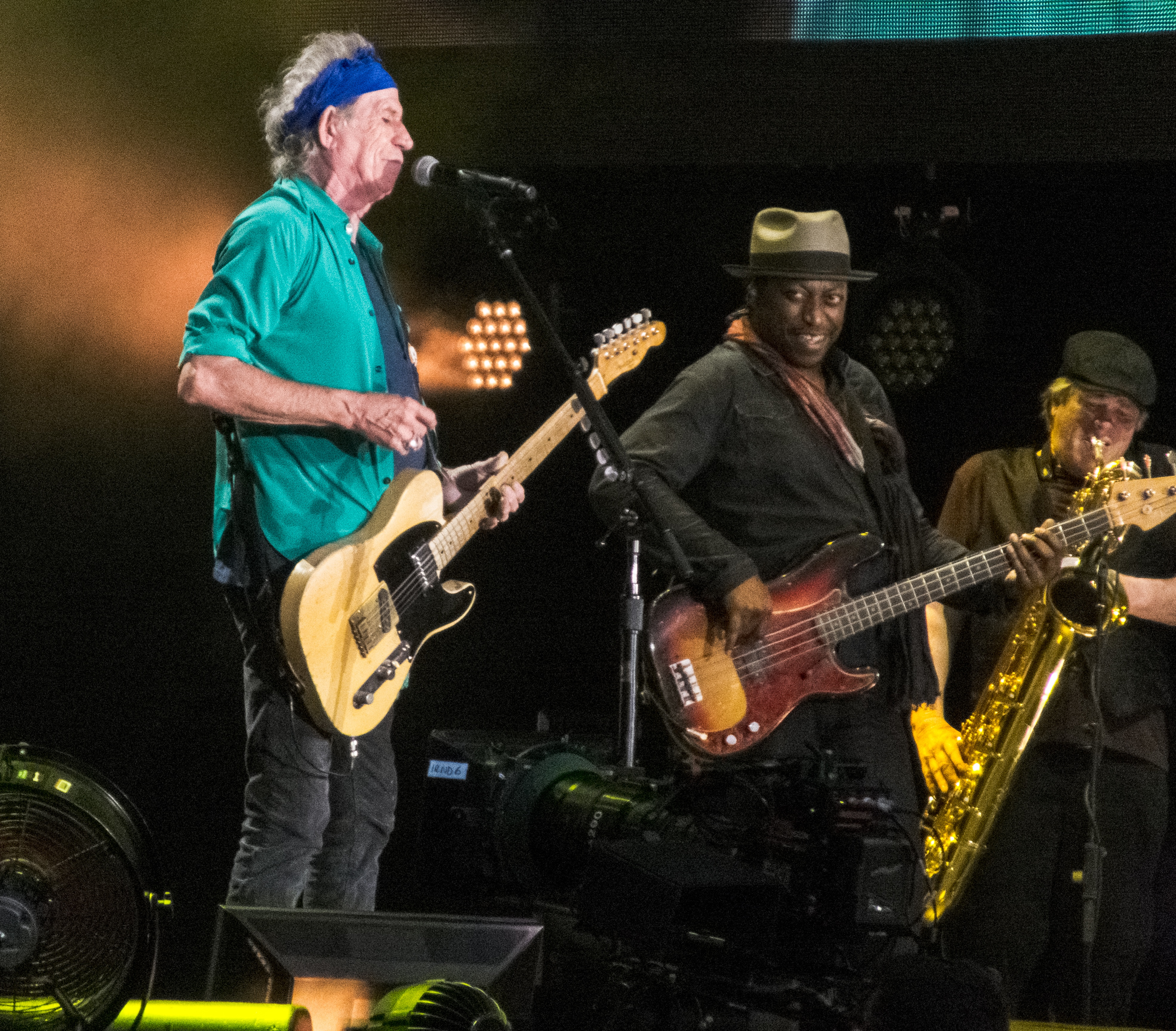
Bass player Darryl Jones (centre) and saxophonist Bobby Keys (right) performing with The Rolling Stones. (2013)

- Alex Acuña, drums, percussion
- Justo Almario, clarinet, flute, saxophone
- Bob Babbitt, bass guitar
- Hal Blaine, drums
- Karl Brazil, drums
- Mitchell Coleman Jr., drums
- Luis Conte, percussion
- Paulinho da Costa, percussion
- Steve Cropper, guitar
- Donald "Duck" Dunn, bass guitar
- Nathan East, bass guitar
- Wilton Felder, bass guitar, saxophone
- Amos Garrett, guitar
- Jay Graydon, guitar
- Bobbye Hall, percussion; one of the few female session musicians
- Nicky Hopkins, piano
- Wayne Jackson, trumpet; a regular house musician for Stax Records
- James Jamerson, bass guitar
- Carol Kaye, bass guitar; one of the few female session musicians
- Bobby Keys, saxophone
- Abraham Laboriel Sr., bass guitar
- Michael Lang, piano
- Tony Levin, bass guitar
- Fred Lonberg-Holm, cello
- Hugh McCracken, guitar
- Milton McDonald, guitar
- Mike Mogis, guitar and other instruments
- Airto Moreira, percussion

== N–Z ==
- Joe Osborne, bass guitar
- Pino Palladino, bass guitar
- Earl Palmer, drums
- Bernard Purdie, drums
- Chuck Rainey, bass guitar
- David Sanborn, saxophone
- Leland Sklar, bass guitar
- Geraint Watkins, accordion, piano
- Willie Weeks, bass guitar
- Ramon "Ray" Yslas, drums

== See also ==
- Lists of musicians
