= Åshild Anmarkrud =

Norwegian politician (1939–2026)

Åshild Anmarkrud (born 22 September 1939 – 3 August 2026) was a Norwegian politician for the Christian Democratic Party.

She served as a deputy representative to the Parliament of Norway from Oppland during the term 1997–2001, except for 1997 to 1999 when she was a State Secretary in the Norwegian Ministry of Justice and the Police. She has also been a board member of the Norwegian State Housing Bank from 1990 to 1997.

She was a member of Gran municipal council, then Oppland county council before a last term in Gran municipal council from 1999 to 2003.
