= Åshild Karlstrøm Rundhaug =

Norwegian politician (born 1955)

Åshild Karlstrøm Rundhaug (born 4 January 1955) is a Norwegian politician for the Conservative Party.

She served as a deputy representative to the Storting from Finnmark during the term 1997–2001. In total she met during 27 days of parliamentary session.
