= Edvard Grieg In Jazz Mood =

Edvard Grieg in Jazz Mood

Live album by Kjell Karlsen
- Released: 2008
- Label: Universal Music

Professional ratings
Review scores
Source	Rating
Dagbladet	4/6 stars

Edvard Grieg in Jazz Mood by Kjell Karlsen Big Band is an album released in 2008 by Universal Music

== Reception ==
The review of the Norwegian newspaper Dagbladet awarded the album dice 4.

== Track listing ==
1. «Air, Suite From Holberg's» (04:48)
2. «Anitra's Dance» (03:23)
3. «At Rondane» (03:04)
4. «Gavotte, Suite From Holberg's» (03:34)
5. «Goodnight Song for Dobbin» (05:12)
6. «I Love But Thee» (04:39)
7. «In the Hall of the Mountain King» (03:30)
8. «Last Spring» (04:25)
9. «Morning Mood» (03:04)
10. «Norwegian Dance no. 2» (04:20)
11. «Prelude, Suite From Holberg's» (05:48)
12. «Sarabande, Suite From Holberg's» (06:22)
13. «Solveig's Song» (04:54)
14. «Time Doesn't Heal» (03:30)
15. «Wedding Day at Trollhaugen» (03:38)

== Credits ==
- Vocals: Pitsj Ensamble, Bjørn Johan Muri, Carsten Loly, Heidi Ruud Ellingsen, Kåre Conradi, Torun Eriksen
- Arrangers: Bjørn Jørgensen, Magnus Blom, Dag S. Arnesen, Even Kruse Skatrud, Hans Mathisen, Håvard Fossum, Johan Alenius, Kjell Karlsen, Staffan William-Olsson, Øivind Westby
- Musicians: Børge-Are Halvorsen, Dag Arnesen, Frank Brodahl, Knut Riisnæs, Staffan William-Olsson
- Composers: Edvard Grieg, Kjell Karlsen
- Transelators: W.H. Halverson, Rolf Kristian Stang
- Text writer: Hans Christian Andersen, Mike McGurk, Aasmund Olavsson Vinje
- Orchestra: Kjell Karlsen Big Band
