= Johndoe =

Norwegian band

- Origin: Trondheim, Norway
- Genres: Punk, rock and powerpop
- Years active: 2000-2006, 2013-present
- Members: Jonas Skybakmoen; Terje Uv; Øystein M. Eide; Stian Lundberg
- Website: www.johndoe.no

Johndoe is a Norwegian punk, rock and powerpop band from Trondheim made up of Jonas Skybakmoen (vocals and guitar), Terje Uv (guitar), Øystein M. Eide (bass) and Stian Lundberg (drums). After three consecutive albums in the 2000s, the band went on a hiatus in 2006, to make a comeback in 2013–2014 with the album Slugger.

== Discography ==
=== Albums ===
Year	Album	Peak positions	Certification
Year	Album	NOR	Certification
2000	Explosift!		
2003	Ja takk til trøbbel	5	
2004	Pyromantikk	21	
2006	Dødvinkel	27	
2014	Slugger	11	
2014	Sosialt Liv		
2016	Skandinista		

=== Singles ===
Year	Single	Peak positions	Album
Year	Single	NOR	Album
2003	"Rastløs Rock 'N' Roll"	14	Ja takk til trøbbel
