= Ida Roggen =

Norwegian singer and information officer

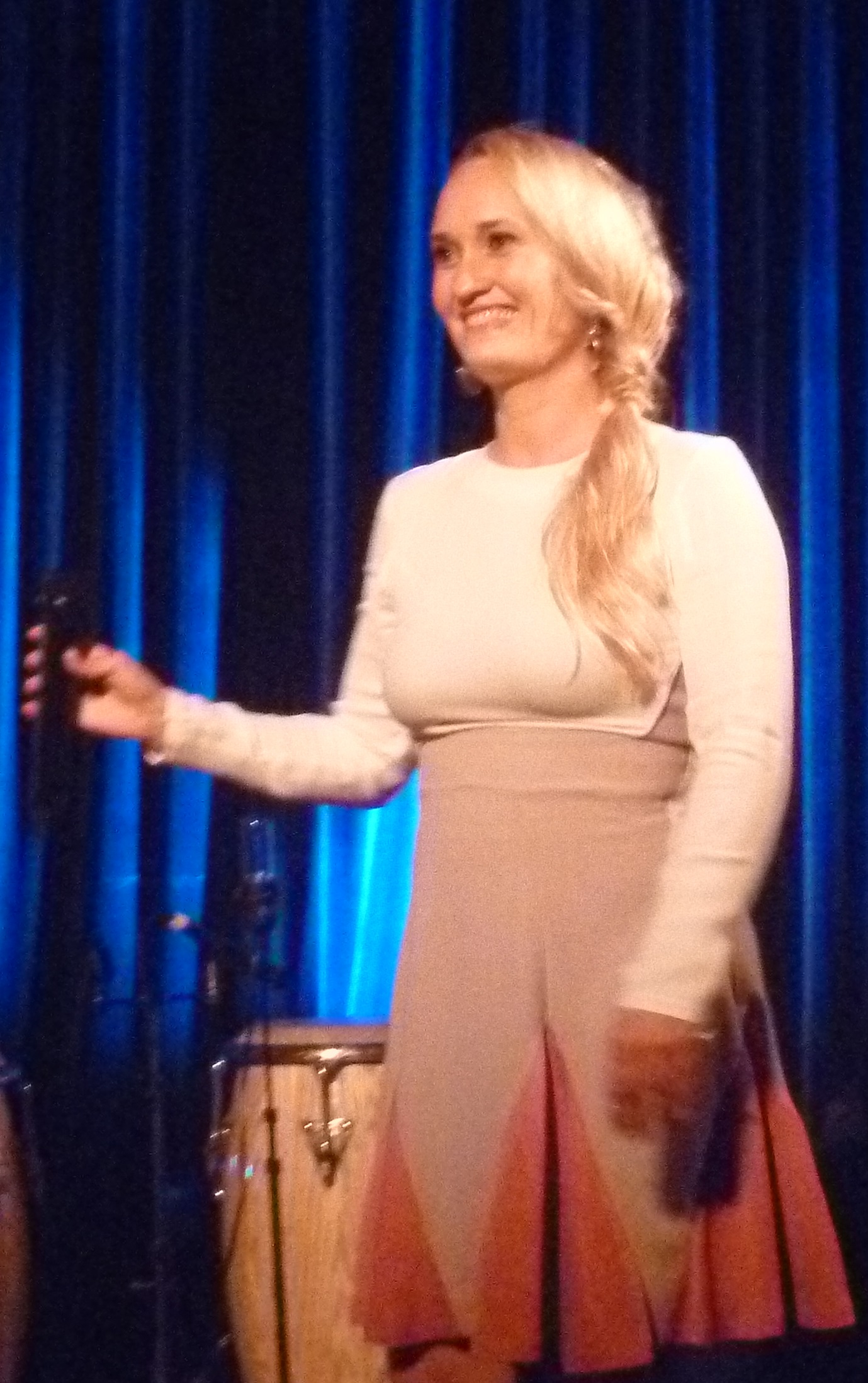
- Roggen with Pitsj at Ingensteds; 10 September 2016.

Background information
- Born: Ida Rannveig Stuve Roggen; 16 September 1978 (age 47); Oslo
- Origin: Norway
- Genres: Jazz
- Occupations: Jazz singer, conductor, editor, journalist, and literary scholar
- Instrument: Vocals

Ida Rannveig Stuve Roggen (born 16 September 1978 in Oslo, Norway) is a Norwegian jazz singer, information officer, and literary scholar, and is the younger sister of jazz singer Live Maria Roggen and twin sister of Soprano Ane Carmen Roggen.

== Career ==
Roggen is well known in Norway after recording the album Pitsj (2006) at the studios of The Real Group, within the vocal group Pitsj, followed by participation in the competition «Kjempesjansen» at NRK together with Tora Augestad, Anine Kruse, Benedikte Kruse and her twin sister Ane Carmen. She also collaborated with the Norwegian rock band «CC Cowboys» on the album Innriss (2011).

Roggen is Information Adviser at University of Oslo.

== Discography ==
=== Solo albums ===
Within Pitsj

- 2006: Pitsj (Grappa Music)
- 2008: Edvard Grieg in jazz mood (Universal Music), with Kjell Karlsen ("I Dovregubbens hall")
- 2009: Gjenfortellinger (Grappa Music)
- 2014: Snow Is Falling (Grappa Music)

=== Collaborative works ===
With «CC Cowboys»

- 2011: Innriss (Warner Music, Norway)
