= Åshild Watne =

Norwegian musicologist (born 1961)

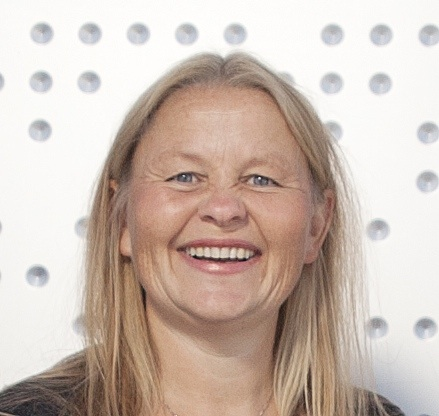
Åshild Watne

Åshild Watne (born 21 February 1961) is a Norwegian singer, composer and music researcher. She works as a docent (teaching professor) at the University of Oslo, Department of musicology, and at the Norwegian State Academy of Music. She is in particular interested in the research fields of absolute pitch and intonation, and teaches aural training and vocal ensemble.

Åshild Watne has performed and composed music within a wide range of genres. She sings traditional songs and plays Norwegian harps and lyres on the album Julefred (1997) She wrote the songs for the children’s jazz album Maneten Medusa (2010). She received a composer’s prize in Wittenberg, Germany (2017), in The European Reformation Song Contest , celebrating 500 years since the reformation. She has written several melodies in Scandinavian hymnals and liturgical music for The Church of Norway.

Her classical choir experience includes the St. Olaf Choir, Minnesota, USA (1982–1988) and The Norwegian Soloist Choir (1984–2006).
