= Pitsj =

Norwegian singing group

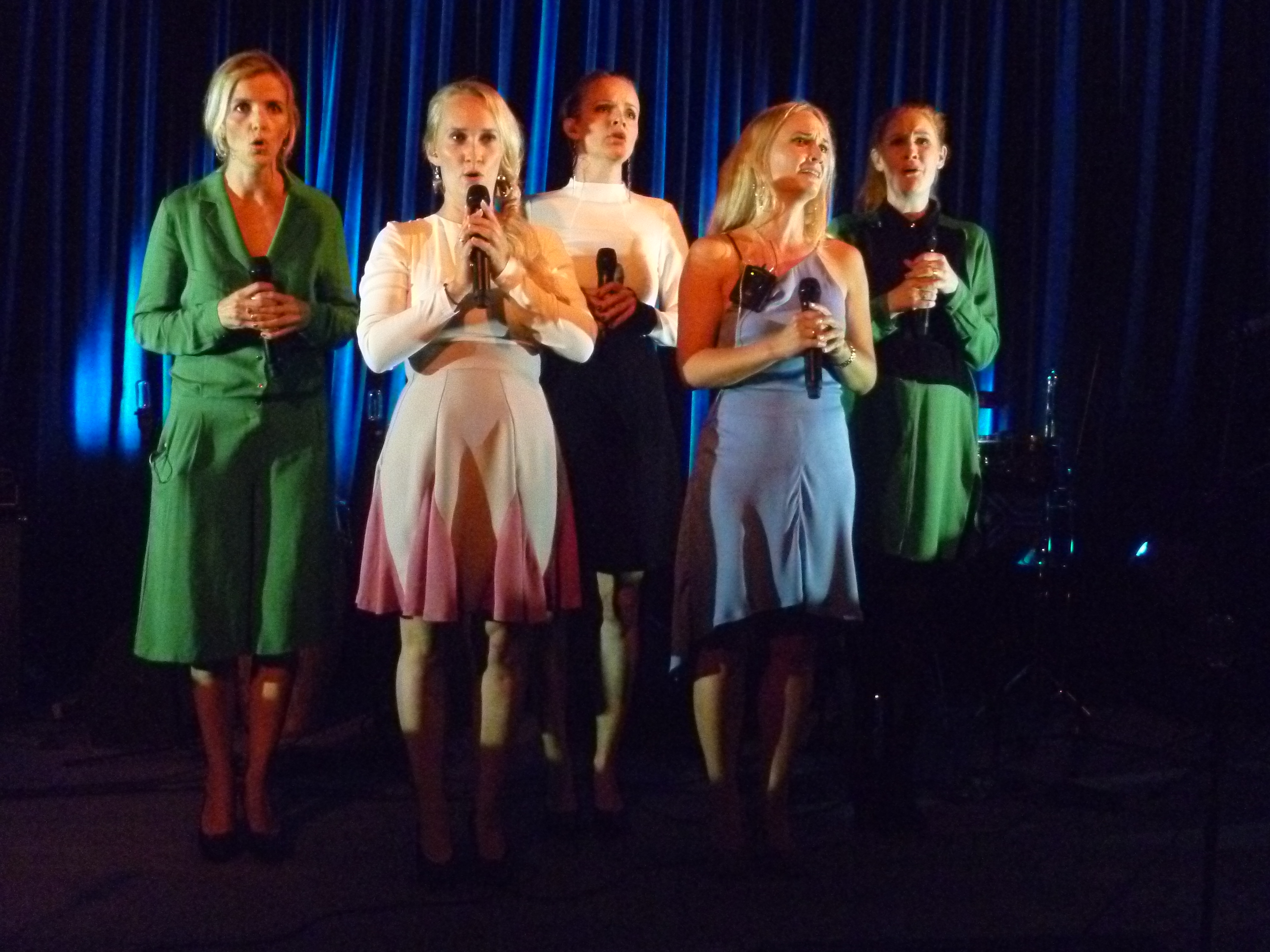
- Pitsj at the 10th anniversary concert at Ingensteds in Oslo, September 10, 2016.

Background information
- Origin: Oslo, Norway
- Genres: Jazz
- Years active: 1999–present
- Labels: Grappa
- Members: Anine Kruse; Benedikte Kruse; Ane Carmen Roggen; Ida Roggen; Anja Eline Skybakmoen
- Past members: Tora Augestad
- Website: www.pitsj.no

Pitsj (founded 1999 in Oslo, Norway) is a female Norwegian a cappella quintet. The band consists of Anine and Benedikte Kruse, the twin sisters Ane Carmen and Ida Roggen, and Anja Eline Skybakmoen (who replaced Tora Augestad when she left Pitsj in 2007).

== Biography ==
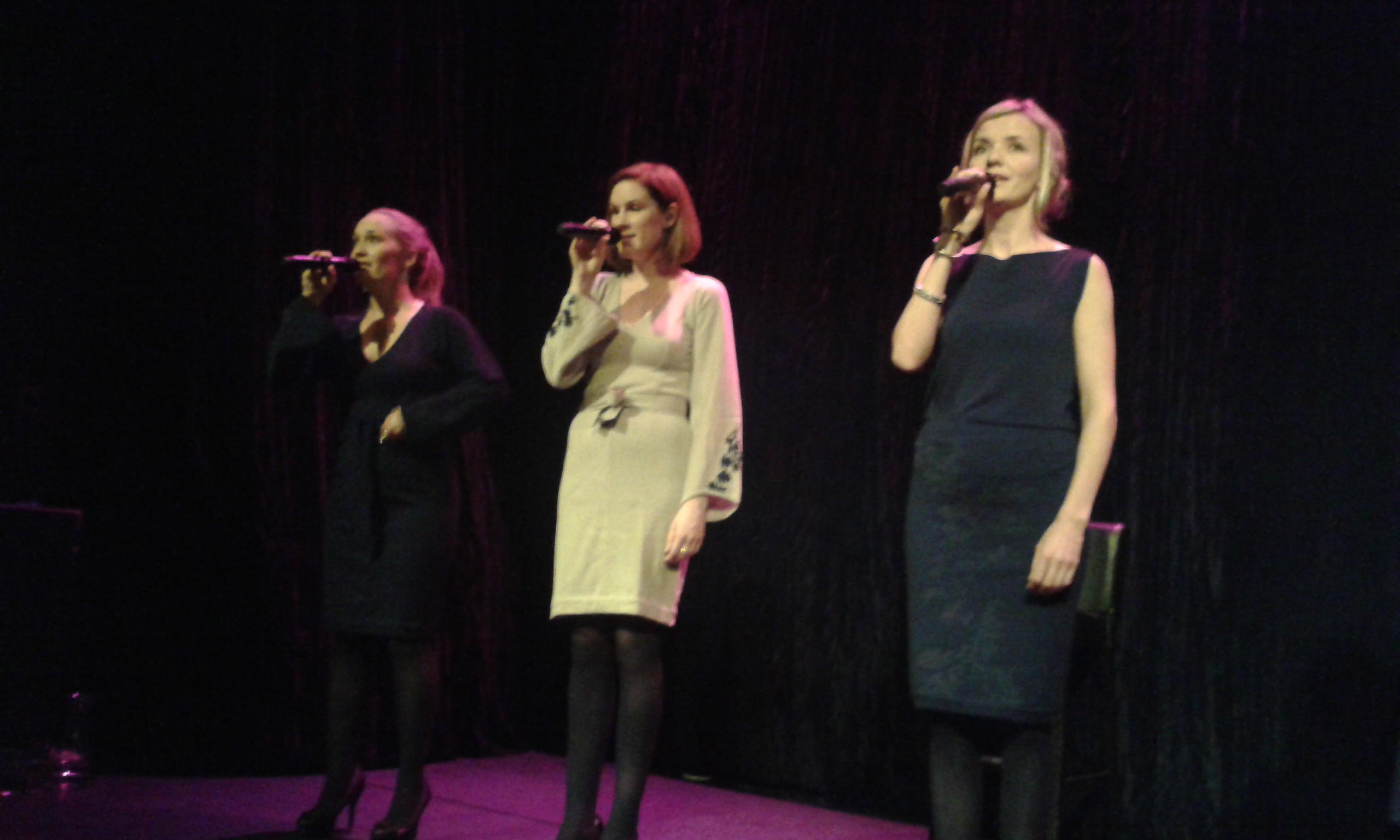
Ida Roggen, Anja Eline Skybakmoen and Benedikte Kruse with Pitsj 2014.

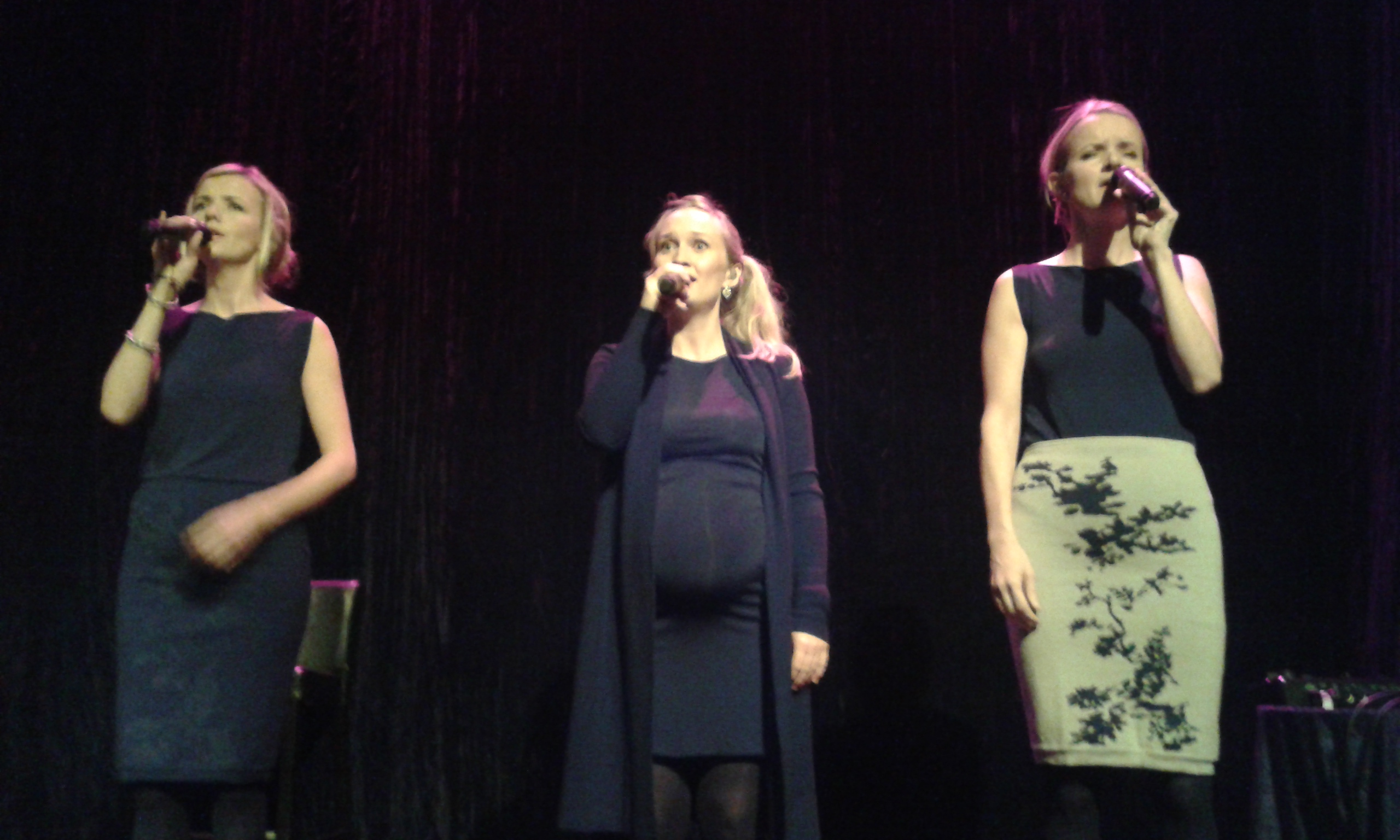
Benedikte Kruse, Ane Carmen Roggen and Anine Kruse Skatrud with Pitsj 2014.

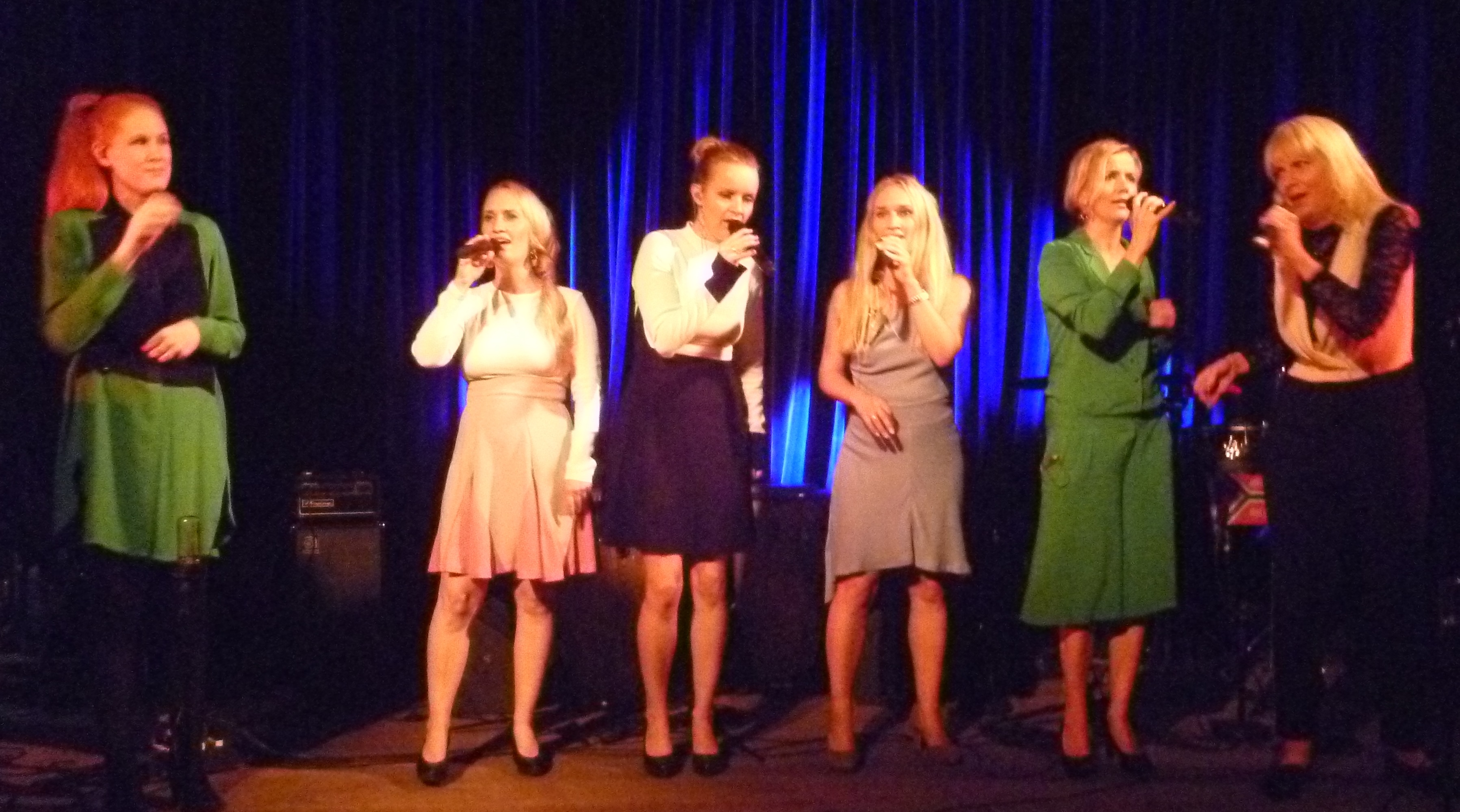
Tora Augestad with Pitsj at Ingensteds in Oslo, September 10, 2016.

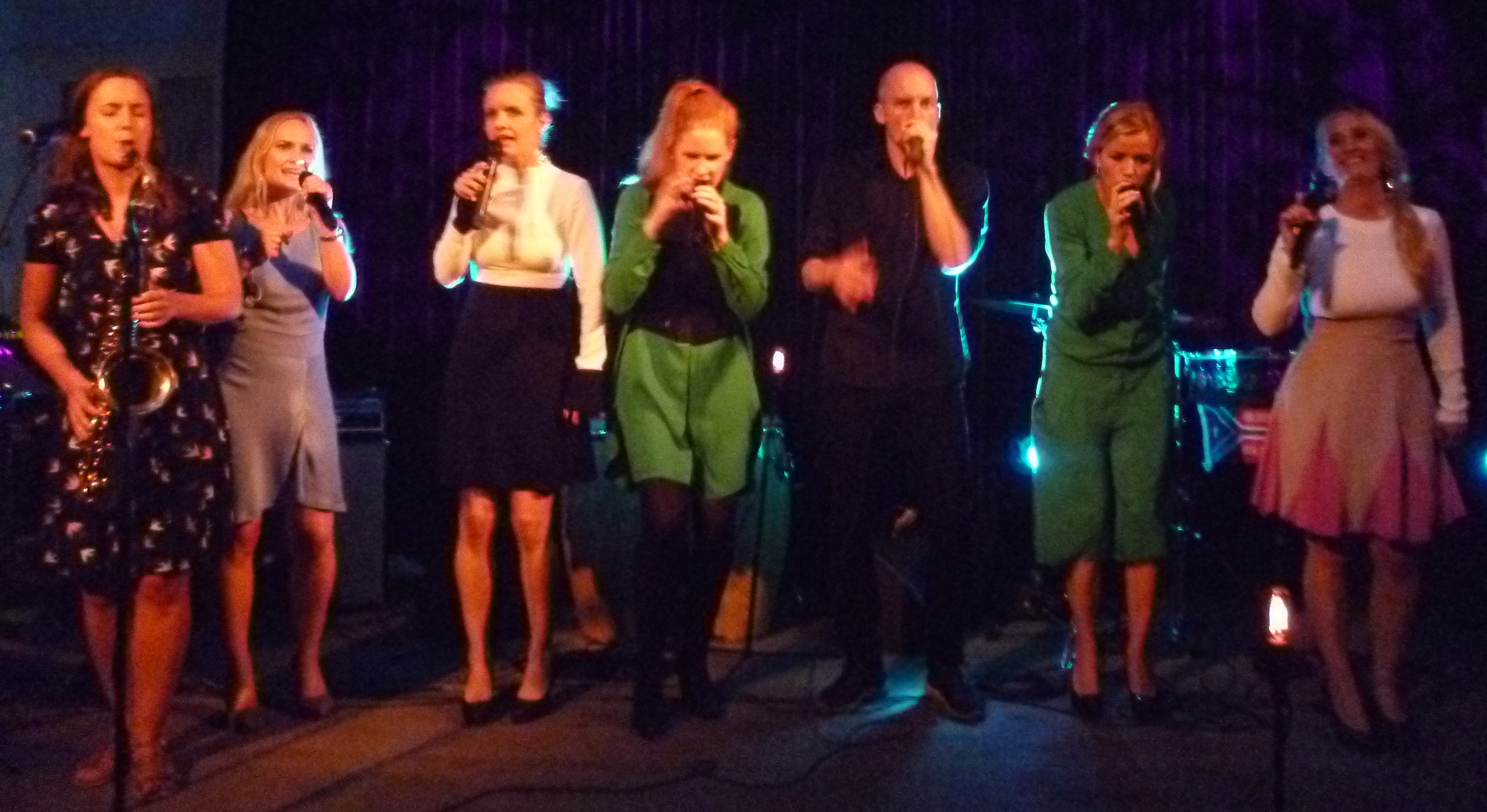
Hanna Paulsberg with Pitsj at Ingensteds in Oslo September 10, 2016.

Pitsj released their first album, Pitsj, on Grappa Records, in September 2006. It was recorded in The Real Group's studio in Stockholm, Sweden and produced by their producer, Anders Edenroth. This album has received good reviews from different Norwegian news papers, one of them Dagbladet. Their repertoire focuses mainly on Norwegian pop and jazz. They made a major contribution to Kjempesjansen 2006.

Pitsj has performed at a large number of Norwegian festivals and concert scenes, and they have featured on Norwegian television. Pitsj has also made joint performances with The Real Group on several occasions, in addition to cooperations with the likes of Ole Edvard Antonsen, Odd Nordstoga, Sigvart Dagsland and Henning Sommerro.

== Band members ==
Present members

- Anine Kruse - vocals
- Benedikte Kruse - vocals
- Ane Carmen Roggen - vocals
- Ida Roggen - vocals
- Anja Eline Skybakmoen - vocals

Past members

- Tora Augestad - vocals

== Festival Appearances ==
- Vestfold-festspillene
- Stavanger International Chamber Music Festival
- Hardingtonar festival
- Gloppen musikkfest
- Follafestivalen
- Landssangerstevnet in Molde
- The Real A Cappella Festival (Sweden)

== Discography ==
Albums

- 2006: Pitsj (Grappa Music)
- 2009: Gjenfortellinger (Grappa Music)
- 2014: Snow Is Falling (Grappa Music)

EP's and Singles

- 2006: Den Du Veit (Grappa Music)
- 2006: Voi Voi (Grappa Music)
- 2016: Syngedame / Pakker sammen og reiser (Grappa Music)

Appearances

- 2008: Edvard Grieg in jazz mood (Universal Music), with Kjell Karlsen ("I Dovregubbens hall")
