= Åshild Ulstrup =

Norwegian journalist

Åshild Ulstrup (born 29 April 1934) is a Norwegian journalist and radio personality. She is particularly known for her many personal interviews and social reportage in NRK over 40 years, including the radio programs Sånn er livet, På livet laus and Middagsstunden. Ulstrup has also published several documentary and interview books, including Rop fra en taus generasjon (1973), Hore og madonna på kjærleikens øy - ein turistrapport frå Syden (1987), Huldra (1993) and 100 pluss, våre eldste forteller (2005).
