= Bjørn Kruse =

Norwegian painter and composer (born 1946)

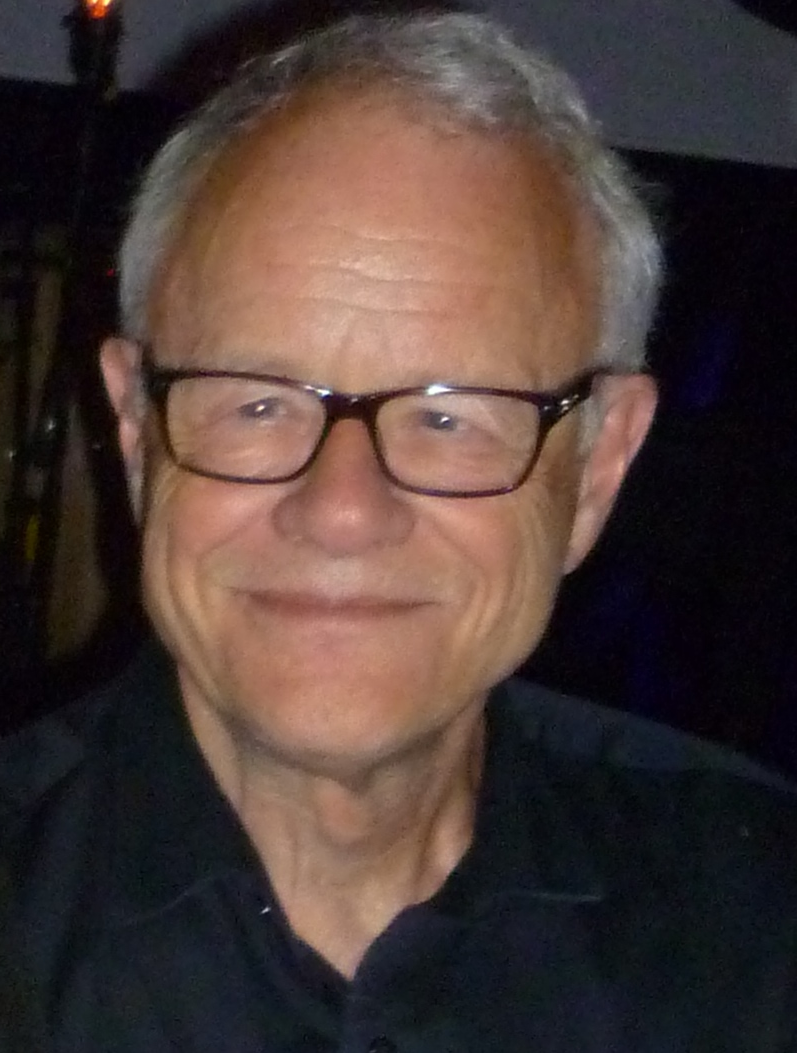
- Kruse in 2016

Background information
- Born: Bjørn Howard Kruse; 14 August 1946 (age 80); London, England
- Genres: Jazz
- Occupations: Musician, painter, professor
- Instrument: Saxophone
- Website: bjornkruse.com

Bjørn Howard Kruse (born 14 August 1946) is a Norwegian painter and composer. He is also professor of composition at the Norwegian Academy of Music in Oslo.

== Personal life ==
Kruse is the son of Colonel Erling O. Kruse (born 1922, died 2016) and Eunice Cooklin (born 1925, died 2014), and spent his childhood in England and the USA. In 1974 he married Professor Gro Shetelig (born 1948) and they had three girls, singers and actors Benedikte (born 1979), Anine (born 1977) and Jannike Kruse (born 1975). Marriage dissolved 2008. Married Karette Stensæth 2012. Kruse has a broad background as a musician, (clarinet and saxophone), producer and music arranger.

== Academic career ==
Ever since his student days he has given lectures at Norwegian Academy of Music, in jazz theory, arranging as the author of Bruksmusikkarrangering (1978) but foremost in composition, and music and arts ethics.

Bjørn Kruse is a lecturer within his academic area, often based on his book Den Tenkende Kunstner ("The Reflective Artist"). (Note: The central theme of this book is about finding the common concepts within all arts, whether music, visual arts, performing arts or other, giving broader insights for the individual artist but also strengthening the "aesthetic competence" of the receiver.)

== Artistic career ==
As a composer, he has created more than 150 titles in the genres of chamber music, choral music, larger orchestral works and operas.

In the dance project Memento Mori young and old are joined together in a theatrical tapestry of dance movement, text, voice, music and sound. Kruse and the choreographer Sølvi Edvardsen wanted in this piece to focus on all stages of life.

A key work in Kruse's compositional career is the opera The Green Knight with libretto by Paal-Helge Haugen. It premiered in Kristiansand, Norway, on 10 March 2004. Kruse's latest major work is Chronotope for clarinet and orchestra, premiered on 21 January 2016 with soloist Fredrik Fors, the Oslo Philharmonic Orchestra and conductor Han-Na Chang.

Kruse formed the vocal group Bendik Singers with his brother Philip Kruse and the singers Anne-Karine Strøm and Ellen Nikolaysen. The group represented Norway in the Eurovision Song Contest 1973 with the song "It's Just a Game". Bendik Singers placed 7th of 17 with 89 points.

== Selected exhibitions ==
His latest major exhibitions of paintings were both at the gallery Albin Upp in Oslo:

- Chaos and Order (2009)
- Space and Time (2010)

== Selected works ==
- Exit (1979)
- Animal (1980)
- Et sjakkspill (1982)
- Metall (1985)
- Nils Holgerson (opera text by S. Lagerlöf) (1986)
- Syntax (1987)
- Ghirlanda (1988)
- Le voci di sempre (1988)
- Saksofonkonsert (1991)
- Panem et circensis (1993)
- Circum polarum (1994)
- Vindsalme for dei døde (1995)
- Song for Winter (1996)
- På evighetens tavler (1998)
- Tiden bøyer stenen (1999)
- Iocus : Scherzo for klavertrio (2000)
- Den grøne riddaren : Opera i 2 akter (2004)
- Mene Tekel : For mixed choir and saxophone quartet (2004)
- Eikon : For chamber ensemble (2006)
- Ode to the Sea : For mixed choir a cappella (2007)
- Timaios : For solo alto saxophon and orchestra (2009)
- Devoured : For soprano, violin and piano (2015)
- Chronotope (2016)
- Concerto For Clarinet And Orchestra (2017)

== Selected recordings ==
=== As musician ===
- 1991: Service for the Nervous – Please Continue Singing (Norway Music Hemera), trio with Warren Carlslstrom & Celio De Carvalho
- 1991: In the hall of the mountain king (Crema) The Norwegian Big Band (Radiostorbandet – NRK)

=== As composer ===
- 1988: Voices – Le voci di sempre
- 1993: Cikada – Syntax
- 1994: The Operamusical – Adam (Norway Music Hemera)
- 1995: Bendik Hofset – Concerto for Saxophone (Aurora Records), album: Orchestral adventures
- 1999: Works for Choir – Song For Winter (Aurora Records)
- 1999: Concentus – På evighetens tavler (Female choir)
- 2016: Portrait With Hidden Face (LabLabel), Eir Inderhaug with Ellen Margrete Flesjø, Ingfrid Breie Nyhus, Gjertrud Pedersen, Ellen Sejersted Bødtker, Eirik Raude, Marianne E. Andersen
- 2016: Phonetix, Lars Lien, Berit Solset, Anders Eidsten Dahl LAWO Classics LWC 109
- 2016: Havet, speilet i toner, Stavanger Vocalensemble Daniel Engen Productions
- 2017: Chronotope, Fredrik Fors, Oslo Philharmonic Orchestra, Christian Eggen LAWO Classics LWC 1129

== Bibliography ==
- Bruksmusikkarrangering 1978
- JAZZTEORI – Grunnleggende prinsipper 1980
- Den tenkende kunstner. Komposisjon og dramaturgi som prosess og metode 1995

== Notes ==
Awards
Preceded by Gjermund Larsen	Recipient of the Spellemannprisen composer award 2017	Succeeded by -
