= Foss Upper Secondary School =

Secondary school in Oslo, Norway

- Foss videregående skole
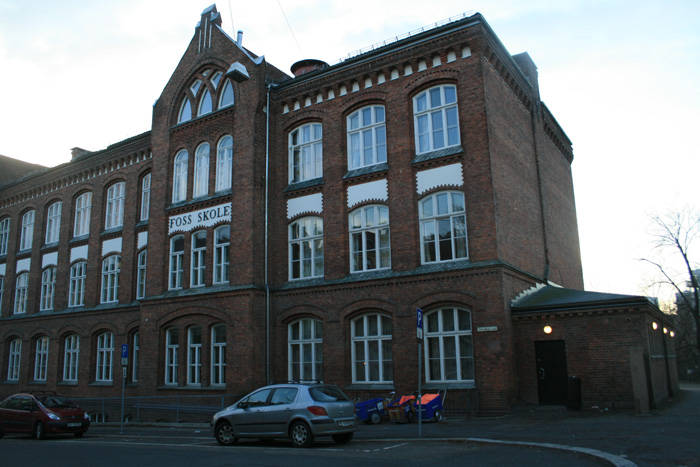
- Foss videregående skole

Location
- Steenstrups gate 20; Oslo; Norway
- Coordinates: 59°55′37.74″N 10°45′20.97″E

Information
- School type: Public secondary school
- Founded: 1900
- Principal: Elisabeth Ringdal
- Grades: 11–13
- Age range: 16–19
- Classes offered: General education Music
- Language: Norwegian; English
- Campus: Urban
- Website: https://www.foss.vgs.no

Foss Upper Secondary School is an upper secondary school in Oslo, Norway. The school was founded in 1900.
