= 2017 in Nordic music =

The following is a list of notable events and releases that happened in Nordic music in 2017.

== Events ==
=== January ===
- 5 - Royal Danish Opera announces that its artistic director, Sven Müller, will leave his position in 2017, three years ahead of schedule. Müller is believed to have resigned because of financial cuts.
- 18 – It is announced that Finland's Esa-Pekka Salonen has withdrawn as music director of the Ojai Music Festival for 2018 because of his composition schedule, and will be replaced by Patricia Kopatchinskaja, ahead of her originally scheduled season in 2020.
- 21 – Hot Club de Norvège headline at the annual Djangofestival at Cosmopolite in Oslo, Norway.
- 28
  - At the annual Uuden Musiikin Kilpailu, Norma John is selected to represent Finland in the Eurovision Song Contest.
  - At Norway's Spellemannprisen, Karpe Diem win the Best Album and Urban Music awards.

=== February ===
- 4 – The Melodifestivalen 2017 kicks off with Semi-final 1 taking place in Gothenburg.
- 25 - At the 47th edition of the Dansk Melodi Grand Prix, "Where I Am", performed by Anja Nissen, is selected as Denmark's entry for the Eurovision Song Contest.
- 28 - At Sweden's Grammis Awards ceremony, Zara Larsson receives the Artist of the Year award and Kent win both the Album of the Year and Rock Album of the Year.

=== March ===
- 2 - At the 2017 Icelandic Music Awards, Júníus Meyvant wins Best Pop Album of the Year for Floating Harmonies. Emmsjé Gauti is named Pop/Rock Performer of the Year, and wins in five categories overall.
- 9 - Esa-Pekka Salonen's Cello Concerto is premièred by Yo-Yo Ma and the Chicago Symphony Orchestra.
- 11
  - The final of the 2017 Söngvakeppnin competition takes place in Iceland. Svala Björgvinsdóttir is selected as Iceland's representative in the Eurovision Song Contest 2017.
  - The final of Melodifestivalen 2017 takes place at the Friends Arena in Stockholm. Robin Bengtsson is selected as Sweden's representative in the Eurovision Song Contest 2017.
- 28 – Under its new conductor Fabio Luisi, the Danish National Symphony Orchestra begins a tour of the United States.
- 29 – The 2017 World Figure Skating Championships open in Finland, using the theme tune "Light Up the Ice", sung by Diandra.
- 31 – The live final of X Factor (Denmark) is won by Morten Nørgaard.

=== April ===
- 7 – The 44th Vossajazz starts in Vossavangen, Norway, continuing until 9 April.
- 12 – Inferno Metal Festival 2017 starts in Oslo, Norway, continuing until 15 April.

=== May ===
- 8 – It is reported that Norwegian Eurovision jury member Per Sundnes has been replaced by Erland Bakke, after the Irish delegation complained about public comments that suggested he was prejudiced against their entry.
- 9
  - Sweden's Sofi Jeannin is appointed chief conductor of the BBC Singers, the first woman to hold the post, effective in July 2018.
  - Finnish soprano Karita Mattila wins the Singer's award at the Royal Philharmonic Society (RPS) Music Awards 2017.
- 13 – In the final of the Eurovision Song Contest 2017, Sweden finish in 5th place, Norway 10th and Denmark 20th, whilst Finland and Iceland fail to qualify for the final.
- 15 - The Swedish Chamber Orchestra appoints Martin Fröst its principal conductor effective from 2019, with an initial contract of 3 seasons.
- 18 - Gita Kadambi is appointed general director of the Finnish National Opera and Ballet announces the appointment of as its next general director, effective January 2018. Kadambi will stand down from her post as general manager of the Helsinki Philharmonic Orchestra.

=== June ===
- 14 - Finnish band HIM open their Farewell Tour in Barcelona.
- 24 - The Roskilde Festival opens in Roskilde, Denmark, running until 1 July.

=== July ===
- 1 – FKP Scorpio announced the cancellation of the Bråvalla Festival, Sweden's biggest music festival, for 2018, because of the number of sex crimes reported at the festival.
- 5 – The 18th Folk music festival of Siglufjordur opens in Siglufjordur, Iceland, running until 9 July.
- 7
  - The Baltic Jazz festival opens in Dalsbruk, Finland, running until 9 July.
  - The 38th Copenhagen Jazz Festival opens in Copenhagen, Denmark, running until 16 July.
- 8 – The 52nd Pori Jazz Festival opens in Pori, Finland, running until 16 July.
- 25 – Susanne Sundfør stars in a Prom concert at London's Royal Albert Hall, performing songs by Scott Walker.

=== August ===
- 1
  - In Search of Stardust: Amazing Micro-Meteorites and Their Terrestrial Imposters, a book about cosmic dust in urban environments by Norwegian musician and polymath Jon Larsen, is published.
  - Finnish-born Tuomas Hiltunen takes over as general director of Fort Worth Opera.
- 2 – Björk announces her still-unnamed new album on social media. In an interview with Dazed and Confused magazine, she states that “It’s about that search (for utopia) – and about being in love. Spending time with a person you enjoy is when the dream becomes real.”
- 3 – The Notodden Blues Festival opens in Notodden, Norway, running until 6 August.
- 8 – The 19th Øyafestivalen opens in Oslo, running until 13 August.
- 20 – Sofi Jeannin makes her Proms debut, conducting the BBC Singers and City of London Sinfonia in a Reformation Day concert.
- 31 – The 12th Punktfestivalen starts in Kristiansand, Norway, running until 2 September.

=== September ===
- 6 – The Copenhagen World Music Festival opens, running until 10 September.
- 8 – Sebastian Fagerlund’s new opera, Höstsonaten (Autumn Sonata) is premièred by Finnish National Opera.
- 11 – Our Festival (Meidän Festivaali in Finnish) starts by Lake Tuusula, Finland, running until September 17.

=== October ===
- 5 – Icelandic band Of Monsters and Men announce that they have become the first Icelandic band to achieve 1 billion Spotify Plays.
- 6 – The 34th Stockholm Jazz Festival opens in Stockholm, running until 15 October.
- 15 – Svitlana Azarova's opera Momo and the Time Thieves, commissioned by the Royal Danish Opera, Copenhagen, receives its world première. It is based on the children's book Momo by Michael Ende.
- 19 – The 34th DølaJazz festival opens in Lillehammer, Norway, running until 22 October.
- 22 – Finnish band Brother Firetribe scheduled to appear at the Rockingham Festival in the UK.
- 25 – The 49th Umeå Jazz Festival opens in Umeå, Sweden, running until 29 October.

=== November ===
- 1 – The Iceland Airwaves festival opens in Reykjavík, running until 5 November.
- 24 – Björk releases her ninth album Utopia.

== Albums released ==
=== January ===
Day	Album	Artist	Label	Notes	Ref.
6	Pentagon Tapes	Dag Arnesen	Losen Records		
10	Ivory Stone / Hof	Misþyrming & Sinmara	Terratur Possessions	10" EP	
13	Politur Passiarer	Scheen Jazzorkester & Audun Kleive	Losen Records		
13	In the Passing Light of Day	Pain of Salvation	Inside Out Music		
20	Chromola	1982 (Nils Økland, Sigbjørn Apeland, Øyvind Skarbø)	Heilo		
20	Music to Draw to: Satellite	Kid Koala featuring Emiliana Torrini	Kid Koala Productions		
20	Vit	Christer Fredriksen	Losen Records	Produced by Christer Fredriksen	
27	Quiet Dreams	Hilde Hefte	Ponca Jazz Records		
27	Godspeed	Morten Schantz	Edition Records	Produced by Morten Schantz with Kristian Thomsen	
27	Meet Me At The Movies	Viktoria Tolstoy	ACT Music	Produced by Nils Landgren executive producer Siggi Loch	
27	Potsdamer Platz	Jan Lundgren	ACT Music	Produced by Siggi Loch	
28	Stereotomic	Nypan	Losen Records		

=== February ===
Day	Album	Artist	Label	Notes	Ref.
10	The High Heat Licks Against Heaven	Nidingr	not known		
24	The Roc	Daniel Herskedal	Edition Records	Produced by Daniel Herskedal	
24	Helluva	Trollfest	Napalm Records		
24	Mitt liv	Charlotte Perrelli	Stockhouse		

=== March ===
Day	Album	Artist	Label	Notes	Ref.
3	For You	Léon	Columbia		
3	Agricolankatu 11	Mikko Kuustonen	Columbia		
7	Animals	Megalodon Collective	Jazzland Recordings		
10	Hulluuden Highway	Haloo Helsinki!	Sony		
17	So Good	Zara Larsson	Epic Records		
24	Meningen med livet	Sonja Aldén	Capitol Music Group		
31	Revelation For Personal Use	Anneli Drecker	Rune Grammofon	Produced by Anneli Drecker	
31	The Venomous	Nightrage	Despotz Records		

=== April ===
Day	Album	Artist	Label	Notes	Ref.
14	Forces of the Northern Night	Dimmu Borgir	not known	Live album	
14	Season High	Little Dragon	Because Music		
21	Sympathetic Magic	Peter von Poehl	BMG Rights Mgmt France SARL		
28	Fanatiko	Barathrum	not known		

=== May ===
Day	Album	Artist	Label	Notes	Ref.
not known	Can't Steal the Music	Aura Dione	Island, Universal, Koolmusic		
not known	Slør (English version)	Eivør Pálsdóttir	not known		
5	Towards Language	Arve Henriksen	Rune Grammofon		
8	Endless Summer	Sóley	Morr Music		
12	Good Times	Mando Diao	BMG Chrysalis		
26	Berdreyminn	Sólstafir	unknown		
26	Liberetto III	Lars Danielsson	ACT Music	With Gregory Privat, John Parricelli and Magnus Öström	
26	Slør	Eivør Pálsdóttir	Tutl Records	AGs1701, licensed to A&G Records Ltd	

=== June ===
Day	Album	Artist	Label	Notes	Ref.
23	Helsinki Vampire	Jyrki 69	unknown		
30	Velocity	Waveshaper	unknown	6-track EP	

=== July ===
Day	Album	Artist	Label	Notes	Ref.
14	Long Live Life	Francobollo	Square Leg Records		
14	Kinder Versions	Mammút	unknown		

=== August ===
Day	Album	Artist	Label	Notes	Ref.
25	Live at Masters of Rock	Korpiklaani	Nuclear Blast	Live album	
25	Born From Fire	The Quill	Metalville		

=== September ===
Day	Album	Artist	Label	Notes	Ref.
15	Åra	Erlend Apneseth Trio	Hubro	Produced by Andreas R Meland and Erlend Apneseth Trio	
15	Anatude	Antti Tuisku	Warner Music Finland	Tuisku's fifth #1 album in Finland	
15	Clocks	Erland Dahlen	Hubro	Produced by Erland Dahlen	
15	Mareridt	Myrkur	Relapse Records	Produced by Randall Dunn	
29	Everybody Loves Angels	Bugge Wesseltoft	ACT	Produced by Siggi Loch with the artist	
29	Pastor´n	Asmundsen & Co	Losen	Produced by Tine Asmundsen and Vidar Johansen. All compositions by Einar “Pastor´n” Iversen.	
29	Piano	Benny Andersson	Deutsche Grammophon	Produced by Benny Andersson	

=== October ===
Day	Album	Artist	Label	Notes	Ref.
20	Walk the Earth	Europe	Hell & Back	Produced by Dave Cobb at Abbey Road Studios	
27	Good Stuff	Iiro Rantala & Ulf Wakenius	ACT	Produced by Siggi Loch	

=== November ===
Day	Album	Artist	Label	Notes	Ref.
3	Kids in Love	Kygo	Sony		
24	Vista	August Rosenbaum	unknown		
24	Før vi mødte dig	Rasmus Seebach	ArtPeople		
24	Kong Vinter	Taake	Dark Essence Records		

=== December ===
Day	Album	Artist	Label	Notes	Ref.
7	Three Faces of Antoine	Status Minor			
29	Endeligt	Nortt	Avantgarde Music		

== Eurovision Song Contest ==
- Denmark in the Eurovision Song Contest 2017
- Finland in the Eurovision Song Contest 2017
- Iceland in the Eurovision Song Contest 2017
- Norway in the Eurovision Song Contest 2017
- Sweden in the Eurovision Song Contest 2017

== Classical works ==
- Teitur Lassen - Chinese Whispers (Hviskeleg) for guitar quartet
- Frederik Magle - The Fairest of Roses - fanfare for two trumpets and organ

== Film scores and incidental music ==
- Vladislav Delay and Jon Ekstrand - Borg vs McEnroe

== Deaths ==
- 18 January - Ståle Wikshåland, 63, Norwegian musicologist (blood clot)
- 7 February - Svend Asmussen, 100, Danish jazz violinist
- 14 February - Tony Särkkä, 45, Swedish musician (Abruptum, Ophthalamia)
- 22 February – Dag Østerberg, 78, Norwegian sociologist and musicologist
- 27 February - Jórunn Viðar, 98, Icelandic pianist and composer
- 6 March - Lars Diedricson, 55, Swedish singer (Snowstorm) and songwriter ("Take Me to Your Heaven"), winner of the Eurovision Song Contest 1999
- 9 March - Barbara Helsingius, 79, Finnish singer, poet and Olympic fencer
- 22 March - Sven-Erik Magnusson, 74, Swedish musician (Sven-Ingvars)
- 9 April – Knut Borge, 67, Norwegian music journalist and entertainer
- 12 April - Mika Vainio, 53, Finnish electronic and experimental musician (Pan Sonic)
- 1 May - Erkki Kurenniemi, 75, Finnish musician
- 4 May - Katy Bødtger, 84, Danish singer
- 7 June - Jan Høiland, 78, Norwegian singer
- 7 July - Egil Monn-Iversen, 89, Norwegian composer and pianist
- 13 July - Egil Kapstad, 76, Norwegian jazz pianist, arranger and composer
- 25 September - Folke Rabe, 81, Swedish composer
- 7 October - Jan Arvid Johansen, 70, Norwegian musician
- 17 October - Ingvar Lidholm, 96, Swedish composer
- 20 October - Boris Lindqvist, 76, Swedish rock singer (death announced on this date)
- 22 October
  - Atle Hammer, 85, Norwegian jazz musician
  - Emu Lehtinen, 70, Finnish record dealer (leukemia)
- 7 November - Pentti Glan, 71, Finnish-Canadian drummer (Alice Cooper, Lou Reed)
- 21 December - Halvard Kausland, 72, Norwegian jazz guitarist
