= 1965 in Norwegian music =

The following is a list of notable events and releases of the year 1965 in Norwegian music.

== Events ==
=== May ===
- 19 – The 15th Bergen International Festival started in Bergen, Norway (May 19 – June 5).

=== June ===
- The 2nd Kongsberg Jazz Festival started in Kongsberg, Norway.

=== July ===
- The 5th Moldejazz started in Molde, Norway.

=== Unknown date ===
- Kirsti Sparboe wins the Melodi Grand Prix, singing "Karusell" by Jolly Kramer-Johansen.

== Deaths ==
January

- 11 – Arne Bjørndal, hardingfele fiddler, composer and folklorist (born 1882).

May

- 23 – Helge Klæstad, judge and composer (born 1885).

== Births ==
February

- 13 – Ole Mathisen, jazz saxophonist, clarinetist, and composer.
- 24 – Tone Åse, jazz singer.
- 27 – Malika Makouf Rasmussen, percussionist, bassist, guitarist, keyboardist, singer, composer and music producer.

March

- 12 – Liv Stoveland, soprano and singing teacher.
- 21 – Kristin Mellem, violinist, composer, and orchestra conductor.

June

- 9 – Helge Sunde, trombonist, multi-instrumentalist, and composer.

July

- 16 – Odd André Elveland, jazz saxophonist and composer.
- 28 – Roger Ludvigsen, Sami guitarist, percussionist, and composer.

September

- 24 – Njål Ølnes, jazz tenor saxophonist and composer.

October

- 9 – Geir Lysne, jazz saxophonist, composer, music arranger, conductor, and Big Band leader.

Unknown date

- Helge Andreas Norbakken, percussionist.

== See also ==
- 1965 in Norway
- Music of Norway
- Norway in the Eurovision Song Contest 1965
