= Quiet Songs =

Studio album by Hans Mathisen
- Released: January 29, 2004
- Recorded: 2002/2003
- Genre: Jazz
- Length: 56:55
- Label: Curling Legs; CLP CD 92
- Producer: Hans Mathisen

Hans Mathisen chronology
Do Not Cover (2004)	Quiet Songs (2004)	Timeless Tales (2011)

Quiet Songs (released 2004 on the Curling Legs label) is an album by guitarist Hans Mathisen.

== Reception ==
Professional ratings
Review scores
Source	Rating
Bergens Tidende	4/6 stars

The Bergens Tidende review by Geir Rege awarded What Was Said dice 4 and stated "The cooperation with Olga Konkova which has a large and varied register as pianist is particularly well working. But the other musicians, including Per Mathisen on upright bass, also gives a great input on this sympathetic subdued but never boring album." (My translation)

The Puls.no review by Tor Hammerø stated that "The range of the music we are served is large. We get everything from the most beautiful, delicate ballads, as the title more than suggests, but we also get hefty rough tracks that show that Mathisen masters the most. What all along shines through is the melodic strength in both the songs and Hans Mathisen guitar performance. Moreover, he is equipped with an exceptionally warm and beautiful tone of his guitar." (My translation)

The album was awarded the 2005 Spellemannprisen in the category Jazz.

== Track listing ==
All compositions by Hans Mathisen

No.	Title	Length
1.	"A Quiet Moment"	5:46
2.	"Beirach"	6:21
3.	"Evans"	5:31
4.	"Theatre Song"	7:31
5.	"The Sleeping Observer"	2:46
6.	"Lament For A Lost Maiden"	6:35
7.	"Late Night"	3:57
8.	"Changing Colours"	5:40
9.	"Restless"	7:10
10.	"Serenity"	5:08

== Personnel ==
- Hans Mathisen - guitar
- Olga Konkova - piano
- Johannes Eick - bass
- Per Oddvar Johansen - drums
- Per Mathisen - bass (tracks #2, 4, 9)
- Ole Mathisen - soprano saxophone (track #9)
- Gary Husband - drums (track #9)

== Notes ==
- Recorded December 6–8, 2004, except track #2 and #4 recorded April 29, 2003, and track #9 recorded August 8, 2003.
