= Geir Lysne Listening Ensemble =

Norwegian jazz ensemble

Geir Lysne Listening Ensemble is a 20-piece big band led by Geir Lysne established in 1999. The band has gained international fame, especially in Germany for the performances of Lysnes compositions. The music is in the genre jazz and contemporary music.

== Biography ==
For the work M.B. the ensemble was nominated for the Edvard Prize (2000). The poem «Hornelen» by Jakob Sande introduced the four-piece suite, Aurora Borealis (Groove Records, 2000), followed up with Live in Berlin - Aurora Borealis (ACT, 2002) from the Berlin Jazz Festival (2001) that gave the band a great breakthrough in Germany.

On the band's third album, Korall (ACT, 2003), the recognized Norwegian folk singer Sondre Bratland contributed. The last of four releases are Boahjenásti, Sami for the North Star, where Johan Sara the yoiker of concert recordings from the Jazz scene Cosmopolite in Oslo, Norway (ACT, T2006). The album gave the German Critics Jahrespreis der Deutschen Schallplattenkritik.

== Contributing musicians include ==
- Trompeter: Frank Brodahl, Marius Haltli, Eckhard Baur and Ole Jørn Myklebust
- Saksofoner: Morten Halle, Klaus Graf, Andi Malle, Fredrik Ø. Jensen, Bernhard Seland and Tore Brunborg
- Tromboner: Helge Sunde, Christian Jaksjø, Jørgen Gjerde, Ketil Hovland and Anders Wiborg
- Fløyter: Ketil Vestrum Einarsen
- Piano: Jørn Øien
- Bass: Jan Olav Renvåg
- Guitar: Hallgrim Bratberg
- Drums and Percussion: Knut Aalefjær, Kenneth Ekornes and Terje Isungset

== Discography ==
- 2000: Aurora Borealis (Groove Records/NRK)
- 2002: Live in Berlin – Aurora Borealis (ACT)
- 2003: Korall (ACT)
- 2006: Boahjenásti – The North Star (ACT)
