= Kåre Grøttum =

Norwegian jazz pianist (1934–2026)

- Born: Kåre Idar Grøttum; 24 January 1934; Trondheim, Norway
- Died: 7 February 2026 (aged 92)
- Genres: Jazz
- Occupations: Musician, composer, music arranger
- Instrument: Piano

Kåre Idar Grøttum (24 January 1934 – 7 February 2026) was a Norwegian jazz pianist, composer and music arranger, as well a known presenter in NRK.

== Life and career ==
Grøttum was born in Trondheim on 24 January 1934. He was active as a jazz musician in Oslo from the mid-1950s, and in 1959 led the orchestra of Oslo handelsgymnasiums russerevy. The pianist Egil Kapstad got his early education from Grøttum, who successively earned master's degree in music at the University of Oslo in 1968, worked as fellow (1965–67), and where he also hosted as music teacher (1985–87). It was Grøttum who composed "Tannpussevise" with lyrics by Sissel Castberg, who gave VG's silver casket to the artists Svein Byhring, Ragne Tangen and Ulf Wengård.

His composition "Småting" (with Ivar Børsum) won Melodi Grand Prix 1972, performed by Grethe Kausland and Benny Borg.

In 1976 he led the television series "Smålåt" together with Dag Åkeson Moe and Nina Matheson. For radio, he then led the "Norsk Kammerunderholdningsverksted" (Norwegian Chamber Entertainment Workshop) in 1977–78 as well as "Grammoforum" in 1979–80. He was a key contributor on the Trond-Viggo Torgersen releases "Kua med fletter og juret på tvers" (The cow with cables and udder across) (1976) og "Harunosågirebort" (If you have got anything, then give it away) (1977).

In 1980, he was program secretary for NRK. Grøttum was often on the jury of the Prøysen Prize and NOPA's awards of annual work.

From 2002 he led the show "Rundt et Flygel" (Around a piano) together with Tine Skolmen.

Grøttum died on 7 February 2026, at the age of 92.

== Honours ==
- 1992: Work of the Year from NOPA, for the album Fra En Musikers Dagbok (From a musician Diary)

== Discography ==
=== As leader ===
- 1992: Fra En Musikers Dagbok (From a musician Diary) (NOPA CD 2924, 1992). Original compositions arranged by amongst others Egil Monn-Iversen, Helge Iberg and Øivind Westby. Performed by Aage Kvalbein, Sigmund Groven, Brynjar Hoff, Petter Brambani, Kenneth Sivertsen, Åse Karin Hjelen, Erling Wicklund, Magni Wentzel, Knut Riisnæs, Per Vollestad and Aina Oldeide.
- 2015: Rainy Days (Losen Records), with Kåre Conradi & Åse Karin Hjelen (vocal), Sigmund Groven & Tommy Reilly (harmonica), Staffan William-Olsson & Tom Steinar Lund (guitar), Olga Konkova & Ingrid Bjørnov (piano), Knut Riisnæs (tenor saxophone) Roy Nikolaisen (trumpet), Erling Wicklund (flugabone), Sture Janson (bass), and Hermund Nygård (drums)
- 2015: På Jorden Et Sted (Losen Records), with lyrics by Andre Bjerke

=== Collaborations ===
With Mona and Sidsel Levin

- 1972: Stian Med Sekken Reiser Ut Igjen (Karussell)

With Trond Viggo Torgersen

- 1992: Trond Viggo – Vol. I (Stageway Records)

== Film ==
- Møtet med den underlege byen på havbotnen (1978). Anime.
- Flyndre-Fanten og den store kloa (1978). Anime.
- Over tare, tare fare… (1978). Anime.
- Gjetergutten og ulven (1974). Anime.
- Gulasj (1992).
