= 1972 in Norwegian music =

The following is a list of notable events and releases of the year 1972 in Norwegian music.

== Events ==
=== May ===
- 24 – The 20th Bergen International Festival started in Bergen, Norway (May 24 – June 7).

=== June ===
- 27 – The 2nd Kalvøyafestivalen started at Nadderudhallen near by Oslo.

=== August ===
- 27 – The 3rd Kalvøyafestivalen started at Kalvøya near by Oslo.

== Albums released ==
=== Unknown date ===
B

Trond Botnen & Svein Finnerud Trio

- Multimal (Polydor Records), with Calle Neumann

== Births ==
March

- 13 – Arve Moen Bergset, traditional folk singer, hardanger fiddler, and classical violinist.

April

- 15 – Christer Fredriksen, jazz guitarist.
- 16 – Øyvind Nypan, guitarist and Assistant Professor (Agder University College).

July

- 4 – Ketil Gutvik, jazz guitarist.
- 29 – Roger Johansen, jazz drummer and composer.

December

- 10 – Odd Nordstoga, folk singer, musician, actor, and sound editor.
- 29 – Annar Follesø, violinist.

== Deaths ==
January

- 10 – Sverre Jordan, composer, orchestra conductor, and pianist (born 1889).

August

- 12 – Alf Hurum, composer and painter (born 1882).

October

- 3 – Kari Aarvold Glaser, pianist and music teacher (born 1901).

== See also ==
- 1972 in Norway
- Music of Norway
- Norway in the Eurovision Song Contest 1972
