= Ensemble Denada =

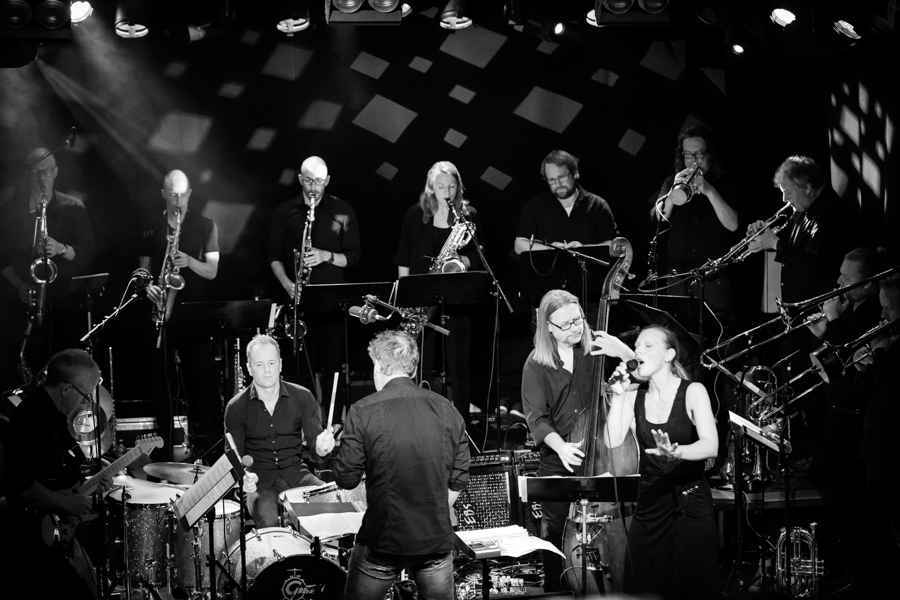

Background information
- Also known as: Norske Store Orkester
- Origin: Oslo, Norway
- Genres: Jazz; Big Band
- Years active: 2000–present
- Labels: ACT
- Website: www.ensembledenada.no

Ensemble Denada or Norske Store Orkester (initiated 2000 in Oslo, Norway as 'Norske Store Orkester') is a Norwegian miniature big band run by "Østnorsk jazzsenter".

== Biography ==
Ensemble Denada comprises about fifteen musicians, and has a Nordic profile through choice of music and its lineup. It has been led by Frank Brodahl and Helge Sunde (2005–). For the 2002 «Storbandfestivalen» they performed the works of Frode Fjellheim and Daniel Bingert.

In 2003 the ensemble performed a commissioned work by Olga Konkova at the Oslo Jazzfestival. For the «Vinterjazz» 2005, they performed works of their own Helge Sunde.

For the 2015 Kongsberg Jazz Festival they performed music by and with vocalist Mari Kvien Brunvoll. Her electronic compositions were adapted and arranged for a broader lineup by Erik Johannessen and Lars Horntveth, in addition to compositions by Helge Sunde.

== Band members ==
Current members

- Vocal/electronics: Mari Kvien Brunvoll
- Trumpet: Frank Brodahl, Marius Haltli, Anders Eriksson
- Soprano saxophone: André Roligheten
- Alt saxophone, flute: Børge-Are Halvorsen
- Tenor saxophone, bass clarinet: Atle Nymo
- Bass saxophone, contra-alto clarinet, tubax: Nils Jansen
- Trombone: Even Kruse Skatrud, Erik Johannessen, Helge Sunde (musical director)
- Guitar: Jens Thoresen
- Piano: Olga Konkova
- Bass: Mats Eilertsen
- Drums: Håkon Mjåset Johansen

Past members

- Trumpet: Eckhard Baur, Birgit Kjuus
- Saxophone and woodwind: Håvard Fossum, Geir Lysne, Petter Wettre, Fredrik Øie Jensen, Frode Nymo
- Trombone: Øyvind Brække, Lars Erik Gudim, Geir Arne Haugsrud
- Guitar: Hallgrim Bratberg
- Bass: Daniel Bingert, Steinar Raknes, Per Mathisen
- Drums: Andreas Bye, Rune Arnesen

== Honors ==
- 2010: Recipient of the German Echo Award as best big band record for the album Finding Nymo (2009)

== Discography ==
- 2006: Denada (ACT), recorded in surround with Olga Konkova and Marilyn Mazur
- 2009: Finding Nymo (ACT).
- 2013: Windfall (Ocella)
- 2019: Live In Bremen (Jazzland Recordings) with Torun Eriksen & Erlend Skomsvoll
