= Nypan =

Nypan is a Norwegian surname. Notable people with the surname include:

- Lisbeth Nypan (c. 1610–1670), Norwegian alleged witch
- Øyvind Nypan (born 1972), Norwegian guitarist
- Sverre Nypan (born 2006), Norwegian footballer
