= Alessa Records =

Austrian record label

Alessa Records (initiated 2004 in Hagenberg, Austria) is a record label mainly releasing in the genre jazz and jazzrock.

== Background ==
After more than 25 years of experience in the music business Peter Guschelbauer decided to start a record label with music of the highest quality. The name is derived from the nickname of his daughter Alexandra, who was one and a half year at the time of foundation. After discovering Jimi Hendrix in the late 1960s, Guschelbauer trans directed towards John Coltrane and the jazz. The fusion of jazz and rock became close to his heart the record label reflect this interest. Guschelbauer operates a recording studio in Hagenberg, some labels, publishing and distribution. Another centerpiece of the company is the event equipment, are being cared for primarily cultural festivals such as the Inntöne Jazz Festival, Gmunden Festival, Jazz Festival Steyr, STIWA Jazz Forum in Hagenberg, Tuesday the Bluesday in the Linz Labour, open the town hall square airs in Leonding.

== Discography ==
Albums (in selection)

| Catalogue no. | Artist | Title | Release date | Format |
|---|---|---|---|---|
| ALR 1001 | Paul Zauner Ensemble feat. Eddie Henderson | Association | 2004 | CD |
| ALR 1002 | John Abercrombie, Arthur Blythe, Terri Lyne Carrington, Anthony Cox, Mark Feldman, Gust Tsilis | Echoes | 2005 | CD |
| ALR 1003 | Clemens Salesny / Bumi Fian Quintet | Always Blue | 2004 | CD |
| ALR 1004 | Uri Caine, Gust Tsilis | Pure Affection | 2007 | CD |
| ALR 1005 | Olga Konkova, Per Mathisen with Ole Mathisen, Gary Husband | Unbound | 2006 | CD |
| ALR 1006 | Straight Six | Live At Birdland Neuburg/Germany | 2009 | CD |
| ALR 1007 | Sandra Rose / Uwe Urbanowski | Gern Bereit | 2007 | CD |
| ALR 1008 | Georg Braith 3 | Live At Jazz Am Berg | 2007 | CD |
| ALR 1009 | Memory Control | The Wonderful Music Gives Happy You | 2006 | CD |
| ALR 1010 | Modern Shape Quartet | Laubwald | 2013 | CD |
| ALR 1011 | Gino Sitson | Way To Go | 2009 | CD |
| ALR 1012 | Alex Pinter Quartet | Pay 8 Get 10! | 2009 | CD |
| ALR 1013 | Joris Dudli Sextet | A Rewarding Journey | 2008 | CD |
| ALR 1014 | Acuña / Hoff / Mathisen | Jungle City | 2009 | CD |
| ALR 1015 | Klemens Marktl's Free Spirit Quartet | Live | 2010 | CD |
| ALR 1016 | John B. Willams | Arabesque | 2011 | CD |
| ALR 1017 | Stillexperienced | The Idea Of Gil Evans ... | 2011 | CD |
| ALR 1018 | Stringzone II | Cookin' At Hvaler | 2011 | CD |
| ALR 1019 | Andy Middleton Trio | Three Hearts, Three Minds | 2011 | CD |
| ALR 1020 | Anna Lauvergnac | Unless There's Love | 2011 | CD |
| ALR 1021 | Trio Akk:zent | So Oder So | 2012 | CD |
| ALR 1022 | Crossing Borders | Trapezoid | 2012 | CD |
| ALR 1023 | Leopoldo F. Fleming, Chris Gonsior | Trato Común | 2013 | CD |
| ALR 1024 | Andrea Veneziani Trio feat. Kenny Werner | Oltreoceano | 2012 | CD |
| ALR 1025 | Vid Jamnik Quartet | Last Minute | 2013 | CD |
| ALR 1026 | Bettina Krenosz | Double Rainbow | 2013 | CD |
| ALR 1027 | Menza - Chicco - Reiter | Non Dimenticar | 2014 | CD |
| ALR 1028 | John B. Willams | African Queen | 2014 | CD |
| ALR 1029 | Soo Cho / Javier Girotto | Ballerina | 2013 | CD |
| ALR 1030 | Ori Dakari | Solid Ground | 2014 | CD |
| ALR 1031 | Summer's End Trio | Day After Day | 2014 | CD |
| ALR 1032 | Anna Lauvergnac | Coming Back Home | 2013 | CD |
| ALR 1033 | Ochsenbauer meets Sokal | Secret Bass Hits | 2013 | CD |
| ALR 1034 | Trio Akk:Zent | Solidaire | 2014 | CD |
| ALR 1035 | Gernot Bernroider's Culturessence | Homebound | 2015 | CD |
| ALR 1036 | Heginger - Herbert - Cech | Springlink | 2015] | CD |
| ALR 1037 | Mathisen - Robin - Borlai | Ospitalita Generosa | 2015 | CD |
| ALR 1039 | Kosmotron | Hexagon | 2015 | CD |
| ALR 1040 | Niogi | Landing | 2016 | CD |
| ALR 1045 | Tamara Obrovac, Transhistria Ensemble | Canto Amoroso | 2016 | CD |
| ALR 1046 | Per Mathisen & Utsi Zimring With David Kikoski | New York City Magic | 2016 | CD |
| ALR 1049 | trio akk:zent | Sweet Desert | 2016 | CD |
| ALR 1051 | Duo Vakkordeonioline | Altre Storie | 2016 | CD |
| ALR 1058 | Harry Sokal | I Remember Art | 2016 | CD |
| ALW 4005 | Jelena Krstić | Ljubav! | 2016 | CD |
| ALC 2005 | Christoph Althoff | Freispielen | 2017 | CD |
| ALR 1052 | Kristina Barta | Ema 29 | 2017 | CD |
| ALR 1054 | Don Menza Quartet | Sonny Daze (Live At Jazzland Vienna) | 2017 | CD |
| ALR 1063 | Worry Later | Humpty Bump | 2017 | CD |
| ALR 1064 | Paul Schuberth | Dark Side Of Sun | 2017 | CD |
| ALR 1050 | Still Experienced XL Band | The Idea Of Gil Evans - Vol 2 | 2018 | CD |
| ALR 1066 | Per Bass Viking Mathisen's Heavy Weather | Gratitude Overload | 2018 | CD |
| ALR 1073 | Victhamin | Triangle | 2018 | CD |
| ALR 1080 | Milos Branisavljevic Quartet | Far Away | 2018 | CD |
| ALR 1072 | Sepp | Auf der Walz | 2019 | CD |
| ALR 1079 | Grazias Saxophone & Flute Quintet | Groove Session | 2019 | CD |
| ALR 1078 | John Arman | Fingerstylin’ | 2010 | CD |
| ALR 1081 | Claus Raible | Trio! | 2020 | CD |
| ALR 1082 | Worry Later | Live At Jazzland/Vienna | 2020 | CD |
| ALR 1085 | PRIM | Garnet Tales | 2020 | CD |
| ALR 1086 | Swantje | Now! | 2020 | CD |
| ALR 1088 | B/Y Organism, Daniel Bulatkin, Kirill Yakovlev | New Beginning | 2020 | CD |
| ALR 1090 | Nina Plotzki | De Tout Mon Coeur | 2020 | CD |
| ALR 1093 | Tris | Endangered Species | 2020 | CD |
| ALW 4012 | Tori Tango | Respirando | 2020 | CD |
| ALR 1089 | Manuel Weyand | Rejoinder | 2021 | CD |
| ALR 1094 | Udi Shlomo | Diaspora House | 2021 | CD |
| ALR 1097 | Piero Odorici, Andrea Pozza, Aldo Zunino, Bernd Reiter, Stéphane Belmondo | Dedicated to Steve Grossman | 2021 | CD |
