= Olga Konkova =

Norwegian–Russian jazz pianist (born 1969)

Olga Konkova Ольга Конкова
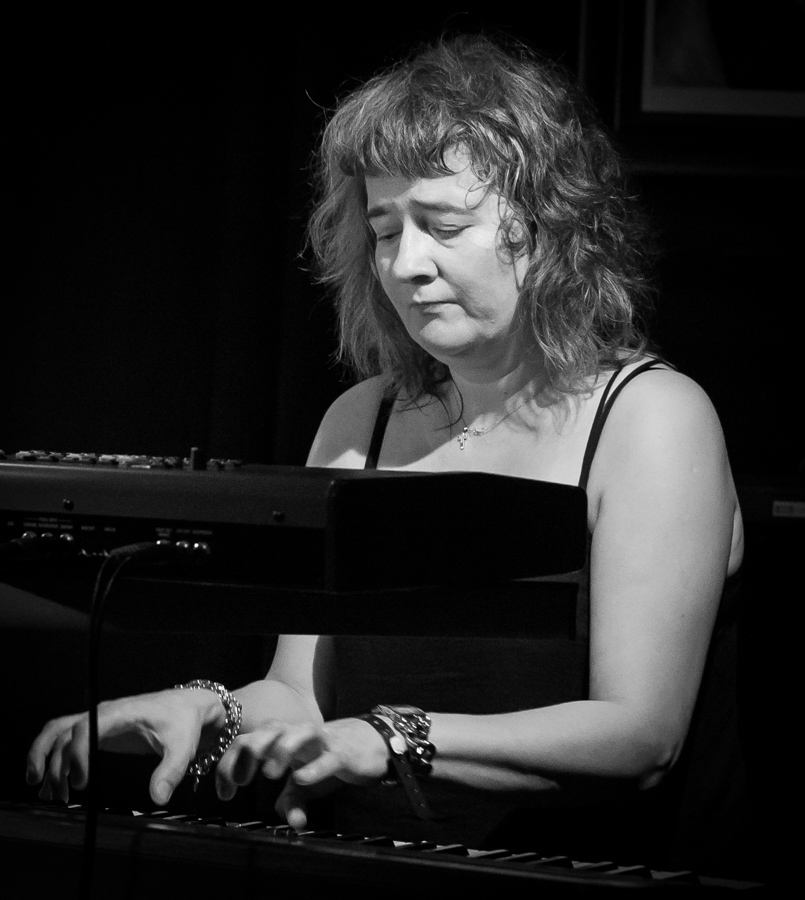
- Konkova at the 2016 Oslo Jazzfestival

Background information
- Born: 25 August 1969 (age 56); Moscow, Russia
- Genres: Jazz
- Occupation: Musician
- Instruments: Piano, keyboards, accordion
- Labels: Losen, Curling Legs
- Website: Olga Konkova on Myspace

Olga Konkova (Russian: Ольга Конкова; born 25 August 1969 in Moscow) is a Norwegian–Russian jazz pianist known from several recordings and collaboration with jazz musicians such as Adam Nussbaum, Gary Husband and Karin Krog.

== Career ==
Konkova was educated as classical pianist in Moscow, and later as jazz pianist at Berklee College of Music in Boston, where she met her husband, the bassist Per Mathisen. After moving with him to Oslo in 1994, she collaborated with Inge Stangvik Quartet and the "Storeslem Big Band". In her own Olga Konkova Trio she collaborates with her husband on bass and various drummers (Adam Nussbaum/Stein Inge Brækhus/Gary Husband). She has also collaborated within "Sernet Å Fyre" and Norske Store Orkester. Konkova has also contributed to album releases and performances with artists like Finn Hauge, Magni Wentzel (Porty & Bess), Roy Nikolaisen (Roy's choice), Øystein Sunde ("Øystein Sunde... og vel så det", 2002) and Hans Mathisen (Quiet Songs).

== Honors ==
- 2005: Spellemannprisen in the category Jazz, with Hans Mathisen, for the album Quiet Songs
- 2013: Gammleng-prisen in the category Jazz

== Discography ==
=== As leader/co-leader ===
Year recorded	Title	Label	Notes
1996?	Going with the Flow	Curling Legs	Trio, with Carl Morten Iversen, Audun Kleive
1997	Northern Crossings	Candid	With Ole Mathisen (soprano sax, tenor sax), Per Mathisen (bass), Jojo Mayer (drums)
1997–98	Her Point of View	Candid	Some tracks solo piano; some tracks trio, with Per Mathisen (bass), Adam Nussbaum (drums)
1997–2001	Some Things from Home	Candid	Trio, with Per Mathisen (bass), Jon Christensen and Adam Nussbaum (drums; separately)
2006?	Unbound	Alessa	duo with Per Mathisen
2009?	Improvisational Four	Caprice	Solo piano; improvisations inspired by Joni Mitchell
2010?	My Voice	Losen	With Wenche Losnegård (vocals); most tracks trio with Per Hillestad (percussion, drums) added; one track quartet, with Knut Hem (effects) added; one track trio with Paolo Vinaccia (percussion) replacing Hillestad
2011	Return Journey	Losen	Solo piano
2015	The Goldilocks Zone	Losen	Trio, with Per Mathisen (bass), Gary Husband (drums, percussion)
2016	December Songs	Losen	Duo, with Jens Thoresen (guitar)
2017	Old Songs	Losen	Duo, with Jens Thoresen (guitar)

=== Collaborations ===
With Finn Hauge

- 1998: Close to My Heart (Hot Club Records), including with Terje Gewelt and Frank Jakobsen

With Magni Wentzel

- 2000: Porgy and Bess (Hot Club Records), performing music by George Gershwin within sextet including Nils Jansen, Christian Jaksjø, Carl Morten Iversen and Espen Rud

With Roy Nikolaisen

- 2003: Roy's choice (Gemini Music)

With Hans Mathisen

- 2005: Quiet Songs (Curling Legs), awarded Spellemannprisen 2005
- 2011: Timeless Tales (Curling Legs), including with Per Mathisen and Andreas Bye

With Helge Sunde and Ensemble Denada

- 2006: Denada (ACT Music), featuring Olga Konkova and Marilyn Mazur
- 2009: Finding Nymo (ACT Music).
- 2013: Windfall (Ocella Records)

Awards
Preceded by Eldbjørg Raknes	Recipient of the Jazz class Gammleng-prisen; 2013	Succeeded by Dag Arnesen
