= 1885 in Norwegian music =

The following is a list of notable events and releases of the year 1885 in Norwegian music.

== Births ==
October

- 15 – Fridtjof Backer-Grøndahl, pianist, composer and music teacher (died 1959).

November

- 14 – Trygve Torjussen, pianist and composer (died 1977).

December

- 6 – Helge Klæstad, Supreme Court judge and composer (died 1965).

== See also ==
- 1885 in Norway
- Music of Norway
