= 1889 in Norwegian music =

The following is a list of notable events and releases of the year 1889 in Norwegian music.

== Deaths ==
January

- 10 – Martin Andreas Udbye, composer and organist (born 1820).

== Births ==
May

- 25 – Sverre Jordan, composer, orchestra conductor, and pianist (died 1972).

== See also ==
- 1889 in Norway
- Music of Norway
