= Per Mathisen =

Norwegian jazz bassist and composer (born 1969)

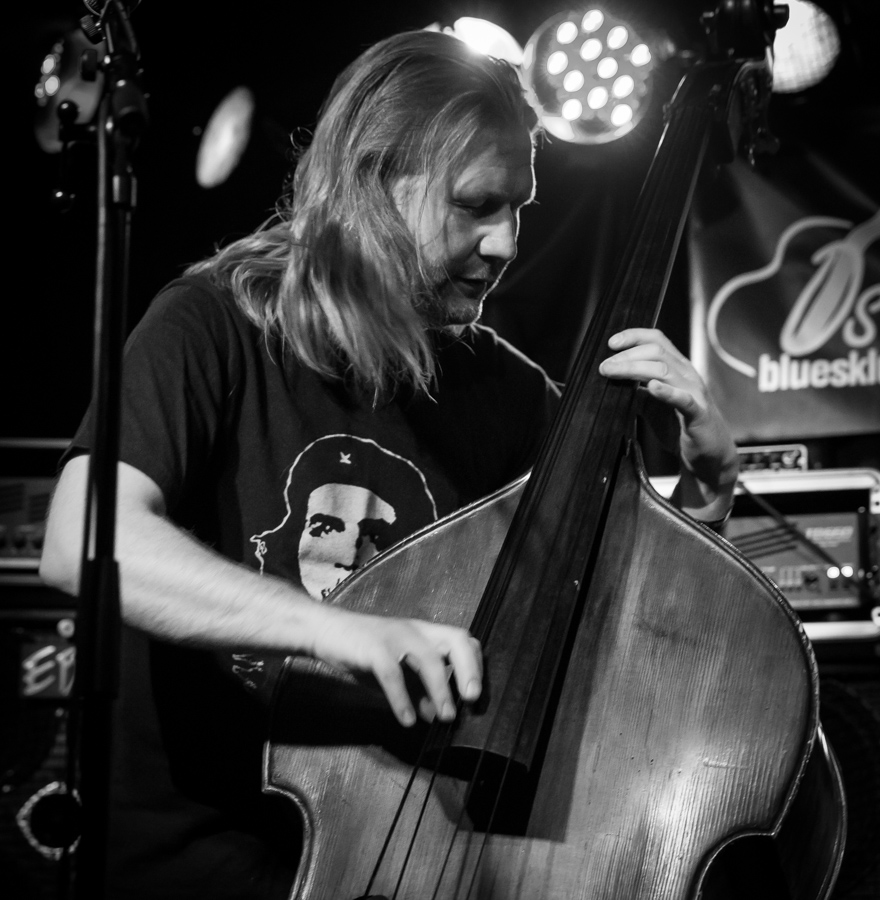
- Per Mathisen performing at the 2016 Oslo Jazzfestival

Background information
- Born: 7 October 1969 (age 56); Sandefjord, Vestfold, Norway
- Genres: Jazz
- Occupation: Musician
- Instrument: Double bass
- Website: permathisen.com

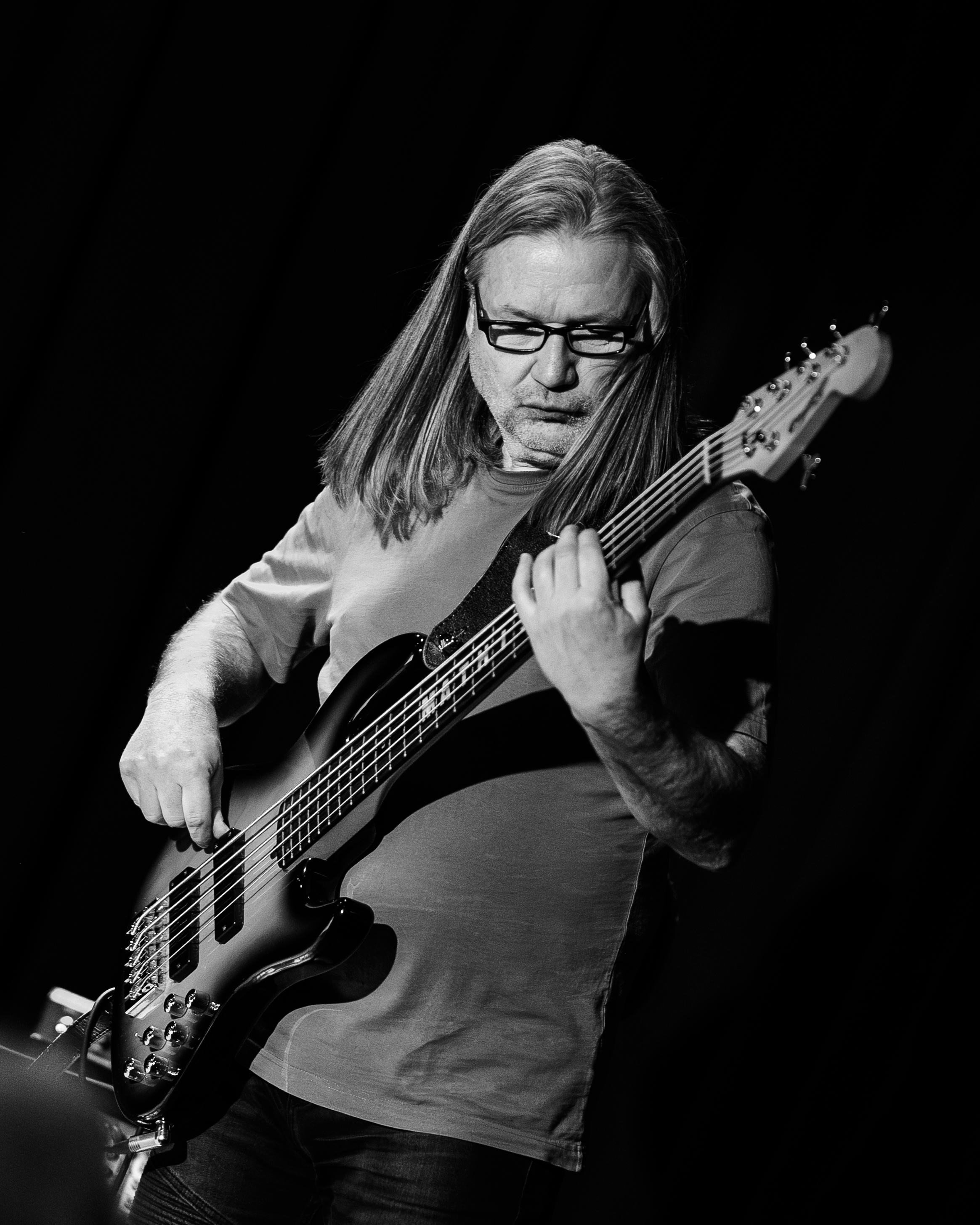
On stage in 2026

Per Mathisen (born 7 October 1969) is a Norwegian jazz bassist and composer who has worked with Terri Lyne Carrington, Geri Allen, Gary Thomas, Bill Bruford, Alex Acuña, Gary Husband, Ralph Peterson, Nguyen Le and Terje Rypdal. He is married to pianist Olga Konkova and is the brother of Hans Mathisen, Nils Mathisen, and Ole Mathisen.

== Career ==
Mathisen was educated on the Jazz program at Trondheim musikkonservatorium 1991–93, followed by a period at the Berklee School of Music in US, and returned to Norway in 1994.

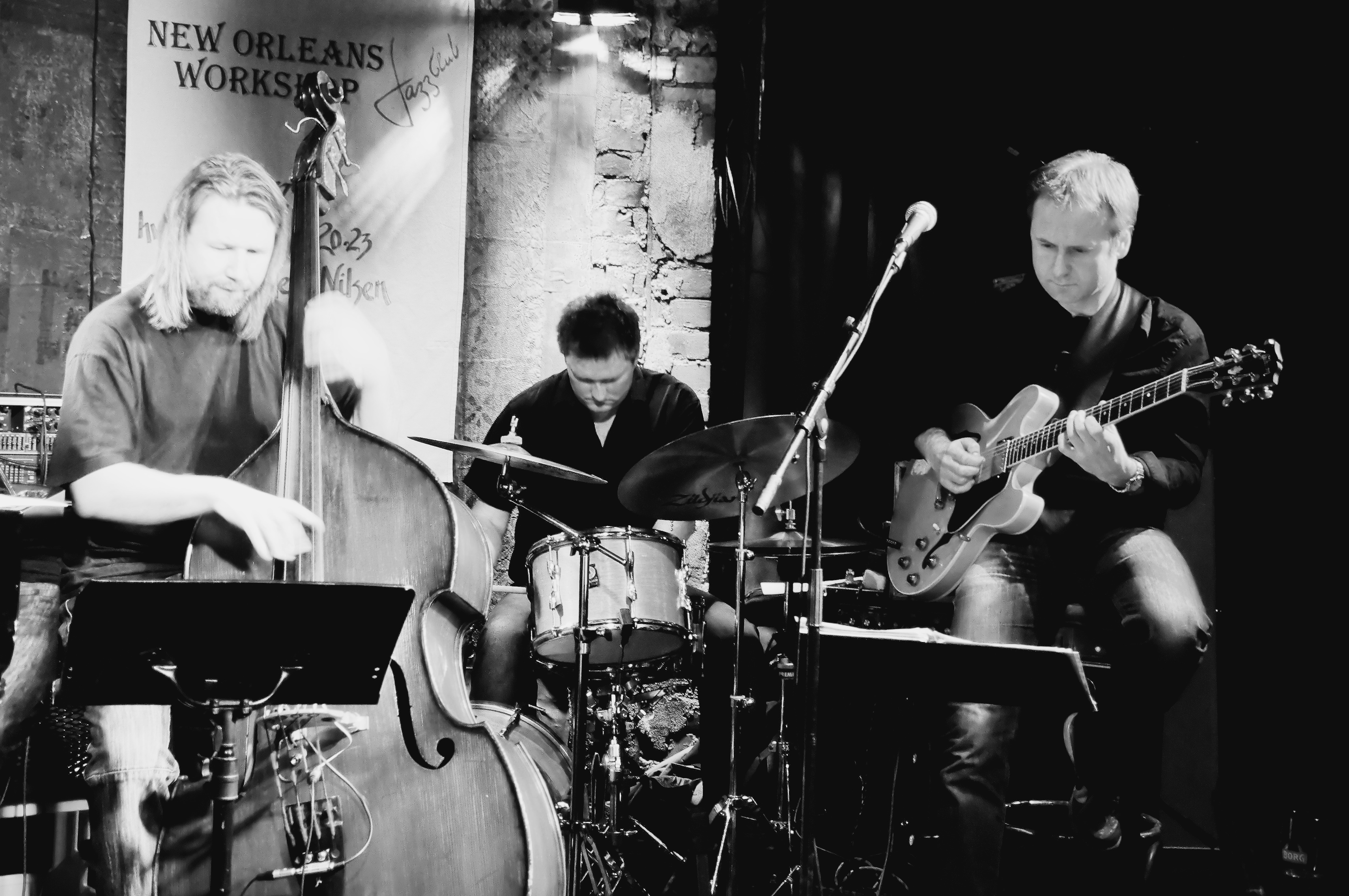
Per Mathisen live at "Herr Nilsen" (2007), accompanied by Roger Johansen central and Hans Mathisen to the right.

He played in various bands in the Oslo region, e.g. "Erlend Gjerde Quintet", "Inge Stangvik Quartet" and "Storeslem", and the records Her point of view (1997), Northern crossings (2000) and Some things from home (2001), as well as Unbound (2002/2006), with Olga Konkova.

In 2001 he toured in Europe with Terri Lyne Carrington, has also played with a number of international names, such as Geri Allen, Gary Thomas, Bill Bruford, Gary Husband, Ralph Peterson, Nguyen Le and Terje Rypdal. From 2003 he was member of the transatlantic jazz collective NYNDK (with a release in 2006), so-called because the musicians come from New York, Norway and Denmark.

Mathisen has otherwise participated on recordings with the band "String Zone" (Mystery bag, 2003), Hans Mathisen (Quiet songs 2002–04), Helge Sunde & Norske Store Orkester (Denada, 2005) and Roy Powell Peak Experience Trio (2006), and has been a regular feature as bassist and leader of "workshops" in Groove Valley (annually held in Beiarn Municipality in Nordland) where artistic director is Jan Gunnar Hoff. 2013 Played with Joseph Williams, Bill Champlin and Peter Friestedt All Star Band.

== Discography ==
=== As leader ===
- 2015: Ospitalita Generosa (Alessa) with Ruggero Robin and Gergő Borlai
- 2016: Sounds Of 3 (Losen) with Frode Alnæs and Giraldo Piloto
- 2016: New York City Magic (Alessa) with Utsi Zimring and David Kikoski
- 2018: Barxeta II (Losen) with Jan Gunnar Hoff and Horacio "El Negro" Hernandez
- 2019: Sounds of 3 Edition 2 (Losen)

=== As sideman ===
With Olga Konkova

- 1997: Her point of view (Candid)
- 2000: Northern Crossings (Candid)
- 2001: Some Things from Home (Candid)
- 2006: Unbound (Alessa)
- 2011: My Voice (Losen)
- 2015: The Goldilocks Zone (Losen)

With String Zone

- 2003: Mystery Bag (Nagel Heyer)
- 2011: Cookin' At Hvaler (Alessa)

With Gerald Preinfalk

- 2003: Tan Go Go (Quinton)
- 2006: Giuffre Zone (PAO)
- 2014: Art of Duo (Col legno)

With Hans Mathisen

- 2004: Quiet Songs (Curling Legs)
- 2011: Timeless Tales (Curling Legs)
- 2014: The Island (Curling Legs)

With NYNDK (New York, Norway, Denmark)

- 2004: NYNDK (Jazzheads)
- 2005: Nordic Disruption (Jazzheads)
- 2006: The Hunting of the Snark (Jazzheads)

With Alex Acuña

- 2009: Jungle City (Alessa)
- 2012: Barxeta (Losen)

With Haakon Graf Trio

- 2010: License to Chill (Nordic)
- 2016: Sunrain (Losen)

With Ole Mathisen and Paolo Vinaccia

- 2011: Elastics (Losen)

With Frode Alnæs

- 2016: Kanestrøm (Øra Fonogram)

With others

- 1996: Ut På Vegom (Grappa Music), with Huldregåva
- 1996: Pausposten Extra! (Norsk), with Ole Paus
- 1998: Damebesøk (Norsk), with Jonas Fjeld and Ole Paus
- 1998: X (Nordicae), with Veslemøy Solberg
- 2001: Tidevann (BMG), with Jonas Fjeld
- 2003: Boska (DAT), with Johan Sara Jr. & Group
- 2004: Løvehjerte (Nordicae), with Veslemøy Solberg
- 2004: La Det Sne, La Det Sne, La Det Sne! (Jazzavdelingen), with Nora Brockstedt in duet with Kåre Conradi
- 2005: Denada (ACT), with Helge Sunde & Norske Store Orkester, featuring Olga Konkova and Marilyn Mazur
- 2005: Christmas Songs (Jazzavdelingen), with Nora Brockstedt
- 2006: Peak Experience Trio (Totemic), with Roy Powell and Ivan Makedonov
- 2008: Edvard Grieg in Jazz Mood (Universal), with Kjell Karlsen Big Band
- 2006: Må'Ån Skin (Mud Music), with Dagfinn Hansen
- 2006: Peak Experience Trio (Totemic), with Roy Powell
- 2006: Denada (ACT), with Helge Sunde, Norske Store Orkester featuring Olga Konkova and Marilyn Mazur
- 2007: Both Sides (Lydmuren), with Vigdis Wisur
- 2008: Gullmåne (Nordicae), with Veslemøy Solberg
- 2008: Alene (Mud Music), with Dagfinn Hansen
- 2008: Edvard Grieg in Jazz Mood (Universal), with Kjell Karlsen Big Band
- 2012: Mirage (2012), with 'FFEAR'
- 2012: De Beste – 60 År I Livet – 40 År På Veien (Sony BMG)
- 2013: Windfall – Music by Helge Sunde (Ozella Music), with Ensemble Denada
- 2014: Live In Coimbra (2014), with Zanussi Five
- 2015: Røter (Nordicae), with Veslemøy Solberg and Jon Solberg
- 2015: Ut Av Mitt Hjerte (Grappa Music), with Guri Schanke
