= Steinar Aadnekvam =

Norwegian jazz guitarist (born 1984)

- Born: 4 April 1984 (age 42); Bergen
- Origin: Norway
- Occupations: Musician, composer
- Instrument: Guitar
- Label: Losen Records
- Website: www.freedomtreemusic.com

Steinar Aadnekvam (born 4 April 1984) is a Norwegian jazz guitarist.

== Life and career ==
Aadnekvam was born on 4 April 1984 in Bergen. After completing his upper secondary education at Södra Latin, he studied at the Royal College of Music, Stockholm. He has also studied at the Vrindaban Gurukul school with Indian classical flutist Hariprasad Chaurasia.

In 2009, Aadnekvam was nominated for the 'Young Nordic Guitarist Award' by the Uppsala International Guitar Festival, and was a 2010 finalist at the 'Norsk JazzIntro' at Moldejazz. He released his debut album Simple Things (2010) later the same year. The album received critical acclaim from reviewers across multiple countries, and was followed by two collaboration albums Abacaxeiro (2011) and Ecology (2014).

In 2015, Aadnekvam signed for Norwegian label Losen Records, where he released the album Freedoms Tree (2015) together with Deodato Siguir och Rubem Farias, receiving a 4 out of 5 star review in Dagens Nyheter. This was followed by Freedoms Trio (2016) and "Freedoms Trio II" (2018), as well as hundreds of live performances across Europe, Africa, Asia and the US, including concerts at the 2016 Stavanger International Jazz Festival, MaiJazz, the 2018 Jazzahead Festival Overseas Night in Bremen, Germany, and at the NAMM Show 2019 Official Artist Selection in Anaheim, California, USA.

== Discography ==
- 2010: Simple Things (MMYH Records)
- 2011: Abacaxeiro (MMYH Records)
- 2014: Ecology (MMYH Records)
- 2015: Freedoms Tree (Losen Records)
- 2016: Freedoms Trio (Losen Records)
- 2018: Freedoms Trio II (Losen Records)
