= Harald Devold =

Norwegian jazz musician

- Born: 13 May 1964; Langevåg, Sula Municipality (Norway)
- Died: 19 February 2016 (aged 51)
- Genre: Jazz
- Occupations: Musician, music producer
- Instrument: Saxophones
- Formerly of: Oslo Groove Company

Harald Devold (13 May 1964 – 19 February 2016) was a Norwegian jazz musician (alto saxophone, soprano saxophone and flute) from Vadsø Municipality in Finnmark county. He is also known as a big band organizer, music producer and music political activist. He was born and raised in Langevåg in Sula Municipality in Møre og Romsdal county.

== Biography ==
Devold received his musical education at the Norwegian Academy of Music. He was known for his versatility as a musician and has since the 1980s been one of Norway's most commonly used freelance musicians. He was a driving force for the big band Oslo Groove Company, which received the 1990 Spellemannprisen.

Devold settled in Vadsø Municipality (1995) and then worked as head of Scene Finnmark, which inter alia disposes regional musician groups LINK and Ensemble Noor. He was a music producer for Scene Finnmark. He helped to initiate a number of productions, which toured the Barents Region and played a key role in establishing contacts between Norwegian and Russian musicians. Among these productions, one find artists like Angélique Kidjo, Morten Abel, Frode Alnæs, Hallgeir Pedersen, Kai Somby, Sondre Lerche, Mari Boine, Petter Carlsen, Marte Heggelund, Ivar Thomassen, Marit Hætta Øverli, Inga Juuso, Anne Grete Preus, Hector Bingert and Knut Kristansen. As a musician, he has also collaborated with various Sami artists, such as Siellu Dalkas, releasing an album in 2006. Devold was selected in 2005 as Chairman for Norsk Jazzforum (NJF). He died of cancer on 19 February 2016.

== Honors ==
- 2015: Culture Prize from Vadsø Municipality
