= 1882 in Norwegian music =

The following is a list of notable events and releases of the year 1882 in Norwegian music.

== Events ==
- Autumn – Iver Holter takes over from Edvard Grieg as conductor of the Bergen Philharmonic Orchestra in Norway.
- unknown date – Norwegian cellist and composer Anton Jörgen Andersen becomes a member of the Royal Swedish Academy of Music (Kungliga Musikaliska Akademien).

== New works ==
- Johan Svendsen – Polonaise

== Births ==
February

- 11 – Arne Bjørndal, composer and painter (died 1965).

July

- 17 – Christian Leden, ethno-musicologist and composer (died 1957).

September

- 21 – Alf Hurum, composer and painter (died 1972).

== See also ==
- 1882 in Norway
- Music of Norway
