= Losen Records =

Norwegian record label

Losen Records (initiated 2010 in Oslo, Norway) is a Norwegian record label founded by Odd Gjelsnes at the distribution company MusikkLosen.

== Background ==
The distribution company MusikkLosen was founded in 1997 by Odd Gjelsnes, and Losen Records, which is under the operation of MusikkLosen, had its first album release with the album Norwegian Song 3 by Dag Arnesen in late 2010. MusikkLosen distributes music in the genres jazz, classical, rock, blues, ethnic, soundtracks and more. The company is currently (2014) working on its 27th album release within the last three years. Alongside a partner, the company has also built its own recording studio in Spain called Studio Barxeta, which had its first album recording with Alex Acuña, Jan Gunnar Hoff and Per Mathisen in August 2012.

== Discography ==
Albums (in selection)

Catalogue no.	Artist	Title	Release date	Format
LOS 101-2	Dag Arnesen	Norwegian Song 3	2010-10-19	CD
LOS 102-2	Olga Konkova	My Voice	2010-11-18	CD
LOS 103-2	Frank Kvinge	Arctic Skyway	2011-01-31	CD
LOS 104-2	Ole Mathisen, Paolo Vinaccia, Per Mathisen	Elastics	2011-03-11	CD
LOS 105-2	The Rainbow Band directed by John Surman	The Rainbow Band Sessions	2011-03-11	CD
LOS 106-2	Olga Konkova	Return Journey	2011-05-06	CD
LOS 111-2	Hildegunn Øiseth	Stillness	2011-12-02	CD
LOS 112-2	Fossum / Halvorsen Quartet	Examination of What	2011-11-14	CD
LOS 113-2	Kvinge & Rognlien	Wild Birds	2012-02-10	CD
LOS 115-2	Frank Kvinge	Gaucho Batuta	2012-04-18	CD
LOS 117-2	Helena Wahlström Band	Circle of Legacy	2012-01-01	CD
LOS 118-2	Acuña • Hoff • Mathisen	Barxeta	2012-11-16	CD
LOS 119-1/2	Jan Gunnar Hoff with Arve Henriksen, Anders Jormin, Marilyn Mazur	Fly North	2014-01-06	LP/CD
LOS 120-2	Christer Fredriksen	Trademark	2014-11-10	CD
LOS 121-2	Hildegunn Øiseth	Valencia	2014-01-27	CD
LOS 122-2	Michael Aadal Group	Abigail	2013-06-25	CD
LOS 123-2	OWL Trio - Lage Lund, Orlando le Fleming, Will Vinson	OWL Trio	2013-06-25	CD
LOS 124-2	Nypan	Republique	2013-08-20	CD
LOS 125-2	Svein Gjermundrød	Kitten On The Funkies	2013-10-04	CD
LOS 126-2	Håvard Gimse, Lise Fjeldstad	Blomster Og Blod	2013-11-28	CD
LOS 127-2	Rita Lovise	Craving Coffee	2013-01-01	CD
LOS 128-2	Mirage Ensemble	Memory Happens Now	2014-08-29	CD
LOS 130-2	Andreas Dreier Trio	Poinciana	2014-07-07	CD
LOS 131-2	Mongrel	Taskenspill	2014-11-03	CD
LOS 132-2	Øystein B. Blix	It´s OK To Play	2015-02-20	CD
LOS 133-2	Alf Häggkvist Trio	Fog	2014-11-21	CD
LOS 134-2	Olga Konkova Trio	The Goldilocks Zone	2015-05-15	CD
LOS 135-2	Andreas Loven	Nangijala	2015-01-21	CD
LOS 136-2	Svelia	Transitions	2015-05-08	CD
LOS 137-2	Steinar Aadnekvam	Freedoms Tree	2015-04-24	CD
LOS 138-2	Erik Thormod Halvorsen Quintet	Uppercase	2015-06-05	CD
LOS 139-2	Ivan Mazuze	Ubuntu	2015-09-18	CD
LOS 140-2	David Arthur Skinner	Cubistic Boogie	2015-10-31	CD
LOS 141-2	LIV	Kemedu	2015-09-30	CD
LOS 142-2	Hildegunn Øiseth	Time Is Coming	2015-11-27	CD
LOS 143-2	Kåre Grøttum	Rainy Days	2015-11-06	CD
LOS 144-2	Andre Bjerke – Kåre Grøttum	På Jorden Et Sted	2015-11-20	CD
LOS 145-2	Kristin Norderval	Parrhésie	2016-05-13	CD
LOS 146-2	Knut Riisnæs Quartet	2nd Thoughts	2016-11-26	CD
LOS 147-2	Per Mathisen	Sounds of 3	2016-08-19	CD
LOS 148-2	Mongrel	Thick As Thieves	2016-04-29	CD
LOS 149-2	Steinar Aadnekvam	Freedoms Trio	2016-03-18	CD
LOS 150-2	Ellen Bødtker / Jan Erik Vold / Arve Henriksen / Eirik Raude	Sommeren der ute / Once upon a Summer/Sommer dort Draussen	2015-11-20	CD
LOS 151-2	Medbøe / Eriksen / Halle	The Space Between	2015-11-13	CD
LOS 152-2	Andreas Loven	District Six	2016-02-11	CD
LOS 153-2	Scheen Jazzorkester & Rune Klakegg	Fjon	2016-09-02	CD
LOS 154-2	Rønnings Jazzmaskin	Jazzmaskin	2016-02-26	CD
LOS 155-2	Rebecka Larsdotter	Whirlwind	2016-05-06	CD
LOS 156-2	Øystein Blix	Conditions	2016-08-12	CD
LOS 157-2	Olga Konkova & Jens Thoresen	December Songs	2016-11-11	CD
LOS 158-2	Michael Aadal Group	Pomona	2016-09-16	CD
LOS 160-2	Dag Arnesen Trio	Pentagon Tapes	2017-01-06	CD
LOS 161-2	Andreas Dreier	Music with Z	2016-09-30	CD
LOS 162-2	Lorenzo De Finti	We Live Here	2016-09-23	CD
LOS 163-2	Haakon Graf – Erik Smith – Per Mathisen	Sunrain	2016-09-09	CD
LOS 164-1/2	Sandra Borøy	Sus	2016-09-02	LP/CD
LOS 165-2	Gine Gaustad Anderssen	HEIM	2016-11-18	CD
LOS 166-2	Andrea Rea Trio	Impasse	2016-12-02	CD
LOS 168-2	Nypan	Stereotomic	2017-01-28	CD
LOS 169-2	Scheen Jazzorkester & Audun Kleive	PoliturPassiarer	2017-01-13	CD
LOS 170-2	Christer Fredriksen	Vit	2017-01-20	CD
LOS 171-2	David Arthur Skinner	Skinner Plays Skinner	2017-03-31	CD
LOS 172-2	Alf Häggkvist	Blue Serge	2017-02-10	CD
LOS 173-2	Trio Nevado	Absurdo	2017-02-17	CD
LOS 174-1/2	The Tronosonic Experience	The Tronosonic Experience	2017-08-18	LP/CD
LOS 175-2	Andreas Dreier Trio	But Not For Me	2017-09-15	CD
LOS 176-2	Aina Fridén	Up High	2017-07-21	CD
LOS 177-2	Scheen Jazzorkester & Jon Øystein Rosland	Tamanoar	2017-10-06	CD
LOS 179-2	Dino Massa Quartet	Suite Pour Le Piano For Jazz Quartet	2017-06-16	CD
LOS 184-2	Nina Pedersen	Eyes Wide Open	2017-09-22	CD
LOS 186-2	LRK Trio	If You Have A Dream	2017-08-04	CD
