= Oslo Groove Company =

Norwegian musical group

- Origin: Oslo, Norway
- Genres: Jazz and big bands
- Years active: 1985-1996
- Labels: Hot Club Records & Groove Records
- Members: Helge Sunde; Christian Jaksjø; Lars Erik Gudim; Henning Brun; Birger Carlsen; Arne Johannessen; Geir Arne Haugsrud; Vidar Aarset; Stein Villanger; Harald Devold; Geir Lysne; Rune Nicolaysen; Bernhard Seland; Freddy Bagge; Petter Skretting; Knut Riisnæs; Petter Wettre; Rune Haglund; Frank Brodahl; Anders Eriksson; Erik Halvorsen; Morten Brenne; Arne Hiorth; Eckhard Baur; Petter Kateraas; Bjørn Holta; Bent Østebø Johansen; Frode Berg; Asbjørn Ruud; Erik Smith; Lage Børresen; Bugge Wesseltoft; Torge Railo; Stein Austrud

Oslo Groove Company (active 1985-1996) was a Norwegian big band initiated and led by Jens Wendelboe (1985–87). In 1987 Lars Erik Gudim took the lead and Harald Devold led the band. They released three albums, two on their own label, Groove Records. The first album, Anno 1990, was awarded Spellemannprisen 1990.

== Discography ==
Albums

- 1990: Anno 1990 (Hot Club Records)
- 1991: Anno 1992 (Groove Records)
- 1996: Anno 1996 (Groove Records)

Contributors

	Anno 1990	Anno 1992	Anno 1996
Helge Sunde - trombone	Contributed	Contributed	Contributed
Christian Jaksjø - trombone	Did not contribute	Contributed	Contributed
Lars Erik Gudim - trombone	Contributed	Contributed	Contributed
Henning Brun - trombone	Contributed	Did not contribute	Did not contribute
Birger Carlsen - trombone	Contributed	Contributed	Did not contribute
Arne Johannessen - trombone	Contributed	Contributed	Did not contribute
Geir Arne Haugsrud - trombone	Did not contribute	Contributed	Contributed
Vidar Aarset - French horn	Contributed	Did not contribute	Did not contribute
Stein Villanger - French horn	Contributed	Did not contribute	Did not contribute
Harald Devold - saxophone	Contributed	Contributed	Contributed
Geir Lysne - saxophone	Contributed	Did not contribute	Did not contribute
Rune Nicolaysen - saxophone	Contributed	Contributed	Did not contribute
Bernhard Seland - saxophone	Contributed	Contributed	Contributed
Freddy Bagge - saxophone	Did not contribute	Contributed	Contributed
Petter Skretting - saxophone	Did not contribute	Contributed	Did not contribute
Knut Riisnæs - saxophone	Did not contribute	Did not contribute	Contributed
Petter Wettre - saxophone	Did not contribute	Did not contribute	Contributed
Rune Haglund - trumpet	Contributed	Contributed	Contributed
Frank Brodahl - trumpet	Did not contribute	Contributed	Contributed
Anders Eriksson - trumpet	Contributed	Contributed	Contributed
Erik Halvorsen - trumpet	Contributed	Contributed	Did not contribute
Morten Brenne - trumpet	Contributed	Contributed	Did not contribute
Arne Hiorth - trumpet	Contributed	Did not contribute	Did not contribute
Eckhard Baur - trumpet	Did not contribute	Did not contribute	Contributed
Petter Kateraas - trumpet	Did not contribute	Did not contribute	Contributed
Bjørn Holta - bass	Contributed	Did not contribute	Did not contribute
Bent Østebø Johansen - bass	Did not contribute	Contributed	Did not contribute
Frode Berg - bass	Did not contribute	Did not contribute	Contributed
Asbjørn Ruud - guitar	Contributed	Contributed	Contributed
Erik Smith - drums	Contributed	Contributed	Contributed
Lage Børresen - percussion	Did not contribute	Contributed	Did not contribute
Bugge Wesseltoft - piano	Contributed	Did not contribute	Did not contribute
Torge Railo - piano	Did not contribute	Contributed	Did not contribute
Stein Austrud - piano	Did not contribute	Did not contribute	Contributed

== Biography ==
- Vestel, Viggo (1996). Evaluering av Oslo Groove Company (in Norwegian). Oslo: Norsk Kulturråd.

Awards
Preceded by Egil Kapstad	Recipient of the Jazz Spellemannsprisen; 1990	Succeeded by Masqualero
