= Hans Mathisen =

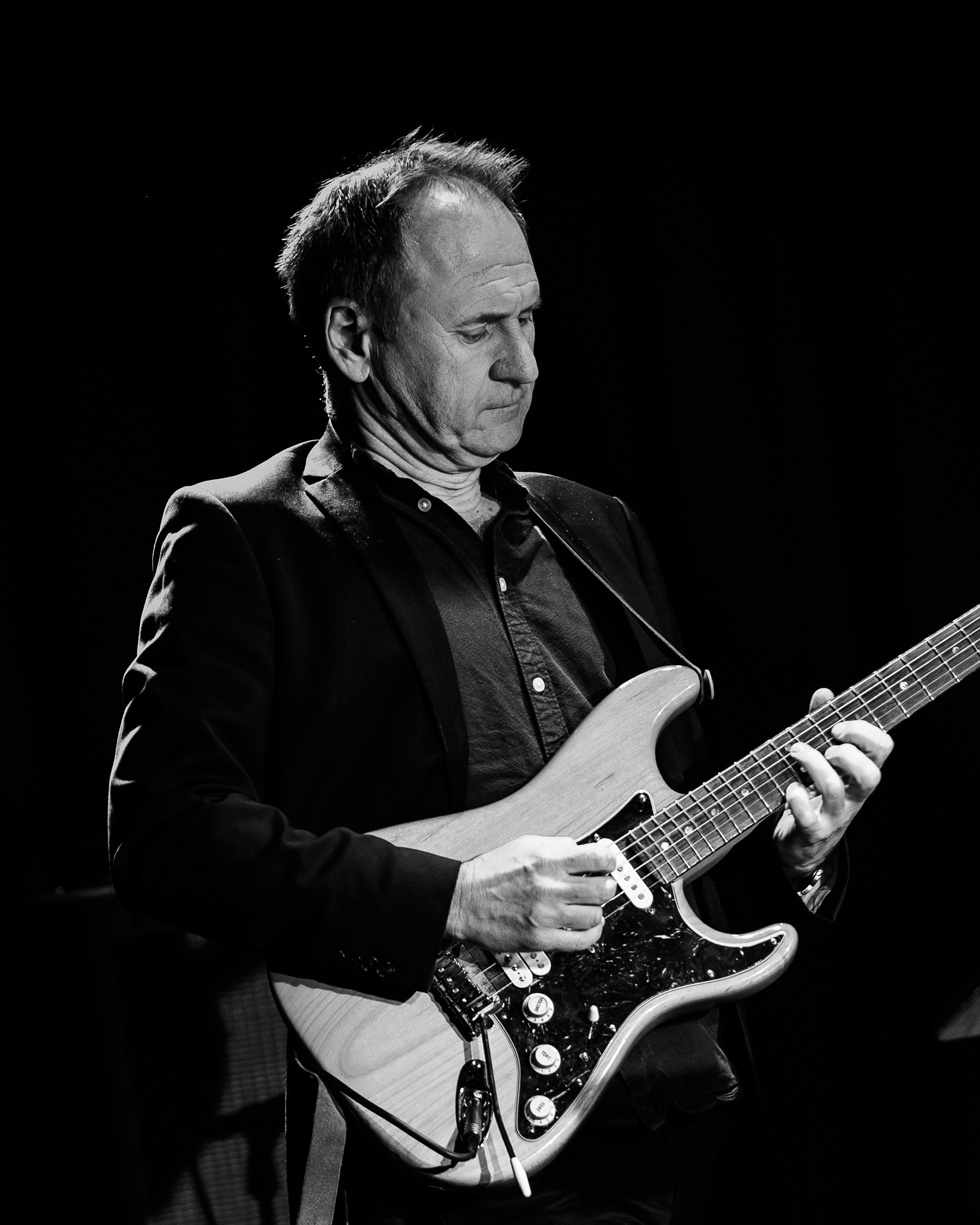
- Hans Mathisen performing in 2026

Background information
- Born: 27 July 1967 (age 58); Sandefjord, Vestfold
- Origin: Norway
- Genres: Jazz
- Occupations: Musician, composer
- Instrument: Guitar
- Website: Hans Mathisen on Myspace

Hans Mathisen (born 27 July 1967 in Sandefjord, Norway) is a Norwegian Jazz guitarist, educated on the Jazzprogram at Trondheim musikkonservatorium (1988–90), well known for his Pat Metheny and Wes Montgomery inspired performances. He is the brother of Jazz musicians Per Mathisen (bass), Nils Mathisen (keyboards, guitar and violin) and Ole Mathisen (saxophone and clarinet).

== Career ==
Mathisen is a graduate of the Jazz program at Trondheim Musikkonservatorium (1990–92). He contributed on Brinck Johnsen's Lover man (1995). In the band Quaternion he cooperated with Jarle Vespestad (drums), Finn Guttormsen (bass) og Arve Henriksen (trumpet) (Timbuktu, Turn Left 1997), and appeared in a duo with Halvard Kausland on the album Good bait (2003), Composed music for Bent Hamer's film Kitchen Stories (2003). He also contributed on Kåre Conradi's La det sne with Nora Brockstedt (2004), as well as Conradi's own God Dag (2005), and are working as an arranger for Kringkastingsorkesteret KORK, Marinemusikken and various other big bands and orchestras.

Mathisen's first release was Quiet Songs (Curling Legs, 2005), where he presented his own compositions. He received good critics and was awarded Spellemannprisen 2005 in the class Jazz. On this recording he cooperated with Johannes Eick (bass), Per Oddvar Johansen (drums) and Gary Husband (drums). In addition, he played his brothers, Ole Mathisen (saxophon) and Per Mathisen (bass). In Hans Mathisen Kvartett, he is cooperating with Olga Konkova (piano), Per Mathisen (bass), Per Oddvar Johansen (drums).

He is the leader of Sandefjord Storband and teaches at the music program at Sandefjord videregående skole, and touring with the project Vi improviserer for Rikskonsertene, with Espen Rud (drums) and Jens Fossum (bass). Mathisen has also written commissioned work Lysande Mørker for the reopening of Oslo Domkirke in 2010 together with Jon Fosse, and the commissioned work Timeless Tales for Vestfold Festspillene in 2009. He released a live album with the Kongelige Norske Marines Musikkorps Storband (Royal Norwegian Navy Band Big Band) in April 2011.

== Honors ==
- 2005: Spellemannprisen in the class 'Jazz' for the album Quiet Songs

== Discography ==
=== Solo albums ===
- 1998: L.U.G.N, feat. Kjersti Stubø
- 2002: Good Bait (Hot Club Records), within 'Kausland/Mathisen Quartet'
- 2004: Do Not Cover (Helping Hand)
- 2005: Quiet Songs (Curling Legs), awarded Spellemannprisen 2005 in the class Jazz
- 2011: Timeless Tales (Curling Legs), with Hans Mathisen Band (Olga Konkova, Per Mathisen, Andreas Bye, Marinemusikkens storband, Sandefjord Kammerkor)
- 2014: The Island (Curling Legs)
- 2017: Orchestral Works (Curling Legs), with Kringkastingsorkesteret

=== Collaborations ===
With Bjørn Willadsen Band

- 1993: Skarland

With Brinck Johnsen

- 1995: Lover man

With «Quarternion» (Arve Henriksen, Finn Guttormsen, Jarle Vespestad)

- 1997: Timbuktu (Turn Left)

With Kausland / Mathisen Quartet

- 2002: Good Bait (Hot Club Records)

With Kåre Conradi

- 2004: La det sne, la det sne, la det sne!

With Nora Brockstedt

- 2005: God dag

With Kjell Karlsen

- 2009: Edvard Grieg In Jazz Mood (Universal Music)

With Olga Konkova

- 2011: My Voice - Music for Piano, Vocal & Percussion (Losen Records), as Composer

Awards
Preceded by Solveig Slettahjell	Recipient of the Jazz Spellemannprisen; 2005	Succeeded by Atomic
