= Nils Mathisen =

- Born: 24 January 1959 (age 67); Sandefjord, Norway
- Genres: Jazz
- Occupations: Musician and composer
- Instruments: Vocals, keyboards, violin, guitar, bass

Nils Mathisen (born 24 January 1959) is a Norwegian jazz musician (keyboards, violin, guitar and bass) and composer, known from significant efforts within cabaret and musicals. Mathisen has released two solo albums, and contributed to releases by Jan Werner, Elisabeth Andreassen, Elg and Arild Nyquist. He is the brother of jazz musicians Per Mathisen (bass), Hans Mathisen (guitar) and Ole Mathisen (saxophone and clarinet).

== Career ==
Born in Sandefjord, Norway, Mathisen was educated Melsomvik Landbruksskole (1981–82) and Horten Ingeniørhøgskole (1984–85). He started as professional musician when he was 15 years old.

In his own Nils Mathisen Band, he played with his brother Hans, and the music in the West Coast Jazz-Rock genre. They released an album on label Mudi, Pop Coast (2007), which had eleven weeks on Norsktoppen.

== Discography ==
- Pop Coast (Mudi, 2007)
- Do Not Cover (Audiovisjon Records, 2008)
