= Frank Kvinge =

- Born: 21 January 1968 (age 58); Sandnes, Rogaland
- Origin: Norway
- Genre: Jazz
- Occupations: Musician and composer
- Instrument: Guitar
- Website: Official website

Frank Kvinge (born 21 January 1968 in Sandnes, Norway) is a Norwegian jazz musician (guitar) residing in Drøbak outside of Oslo, known from several album releases.

== Career ==
After finishing high school in Sandnes he studied guitar at the Guitar Institute of Technology in Los Angeles 1987, before moving to Chicago in 1989. In the period 1989–2001 he worked there as professional guitarist on the jazz and blues scenes, sometimes with his own band. Since 2002 he has lived in Norway, working with the late Jan Erik Kongshaug from 2013 to 2019.

== Discography ==
=== Solo albums ===
Solo guitar

- 2007: Grieg, solo guitar (Ponca Jazz Records)
- 2010: Arctic skyway (Losen Records)

Band leader

- 2001: Brasilian style (Self Release/Losen Records)
- 2006: Small stories (Ponca Jazz Records), with Erlend Skomsvoll (piano), Kenneth Ekornes (drums), Jan Erik Kongshaug (bass) & Sven Nyhus (violin)
- 2012: Gaucho Batuta (Self Release/Losen Records)

=== Collaborations ===
With Synnøve Rognlien

- 2012: Wild Birds (Losen Records)
