= Christian Jaksjø =

Norwegian jazz musician and composer

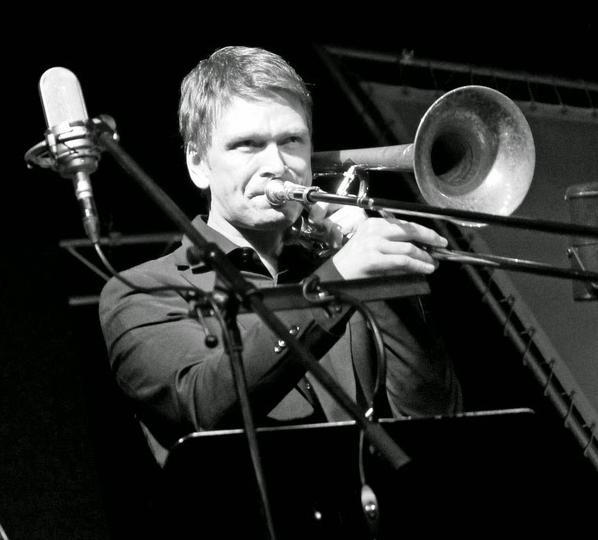

Background information
- Born: 18 December 1973 (age 52); Oslo
- Origin: Norway
- Genre: Jazz
- Occupations: Musician, composer
- Instruments: Trombone, euphonium
- Website: www.grappa.no/en/artister/christian-jaksjo

Christian Jaksjø (born 18 December 1973 in Oslo, Norway) is a Norwegian jazz musician (trombone and euphonium) and composer, mostly jazz where he since 1999 has been part of Bob Brookmeyer «New Art Orchestra» releasing the album New Works (1999, this years jazz album in England).

== Biography ==
Jaksjø was recipient of the soloist award at the big band festival in Imatra, Finland 1992. He studied music on the jazz program at Trondheim Musikkonservatorium (1992–96) where was the leader of Kjellerbandet for a period. He later studied composition at the Norwegian Academy of Music (1996–99) and composed music for the Danmarks Radio Storband.

Jaksjø has also appeared nationally, as in Magni Wentzel Sextet, Søyr, Geir Lysne Listening ensemble, Oslo Groove Company. He is a teacher of trombone at the Norwegian Academy of Music, as well as a composer in the 'Ny Musikk' group (2006).

== Discography ==
With Oslo Groove Company

- 1992: Anno 1992 (Groove]
- 1996: Live anno 1996 (Groove)

With Jens Wendelboe

- 1997: Strolling With The Groove (Rosa)

Ansgar Striepens/Ed Partyka

- 1998: Tunnel Vision - Music for Jazz Orchestra (Mons)
- 2002: Dreams and Realities (Laika)

With La Descarga

- 1998: Descongelate (Chicken Farm)

With Bob Brookmeyer New Art Orchestra

- 1999: New Works (Challenge)
- 2000: Madly Loving You (Challenge), with the Ed Partyka Jazz Orchestra
- 2003: Get Well Soon (Challenge)

With Geir Lysne Listening Ensemble

- 2000: Aurora Borealis (Groove)
- 2003: Korall (ACT Music)

With The Magni Wentzel Sextet

- 2001: Porgy & Bess (Hot Club Records)

With Søyr

- 2001: Alene Hjemme (Curling Legs)

With Solveig Slettahjell Slow Motion Orchestra

- 2001: Live Fra Blå (Curling Legs)

With Lackner Jazz Orchestra

- 2004: Awakening Marko (Double-Moon)
