= Halvard Kausland =

Norwegian musician and civil servant (1945–2017)

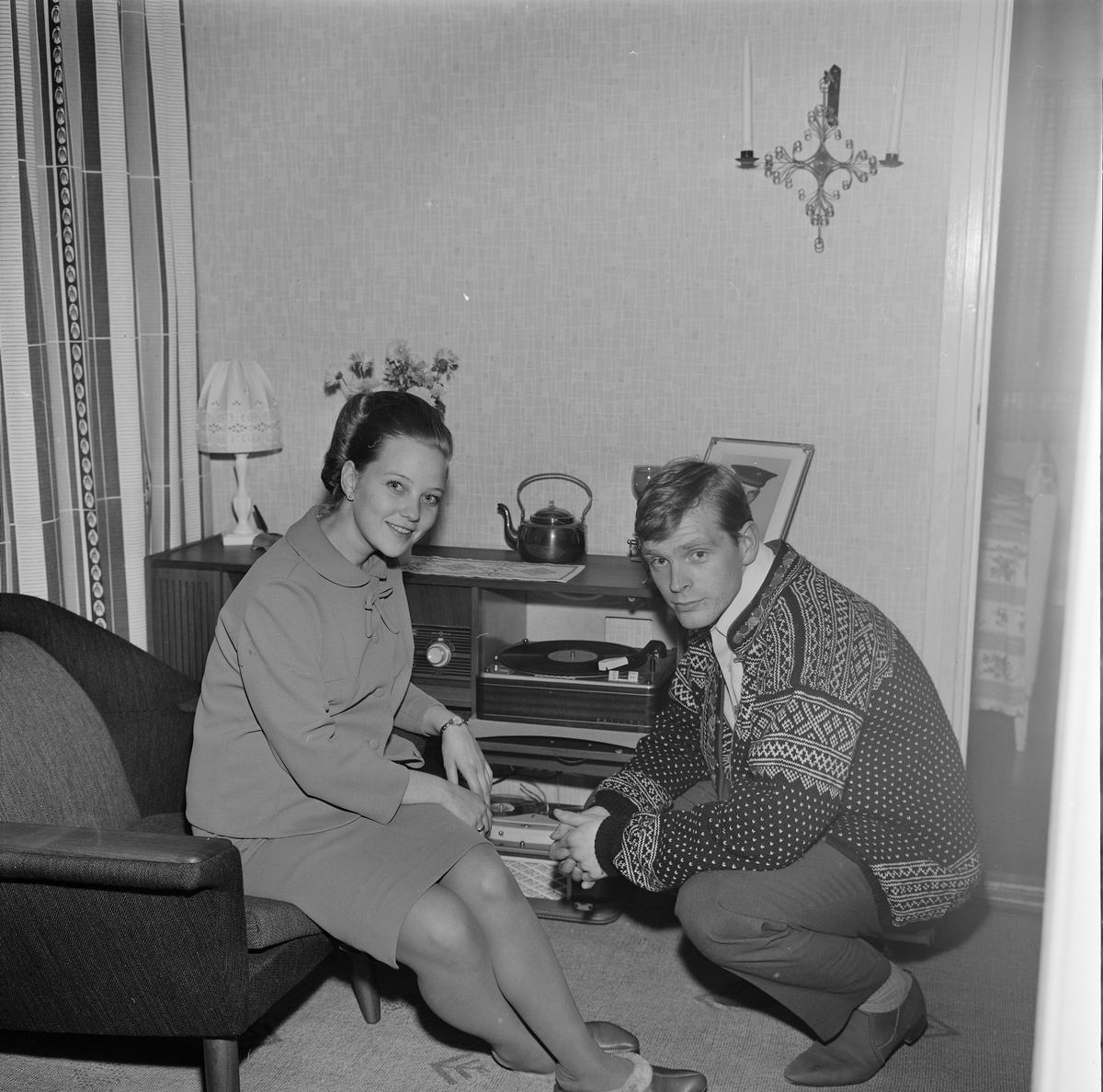
- Grethe and Halvard Kausland (1966). (Photo: Rigmor Dahl Delphin / Oslo Museum)

Background information
- Born: Halvard Magne Kausland; 25 April 1945; Sotra, Sund Municipality, Norway
- Died: 21 December 2017 (aged 72) Oslo, Norway
- Genres: Jazz
- Occupations: Musician and composer
- Instrument: Guitar

Halvard Magne Kausland (25 April 1945 – 21 December 2017) was a Norwegian jazz guitarist and civil servant.

== Biography ==
He hailed from the island of Sotra in Sund Municipality. He received his education from the Norges kommunal- og sosialhøgskole, Agder Regional College and the University of Bergen. On 20 September 1996 it was announced that Kausland had been appointed as acting director of the Arts Council Norway from 1 November 1996 to 31 March 2000; however, Kausland withdrew three days before actually assuming the post. He was later chief administrative officer (fylkesrådmann) of Vestfold County Municipality.

Kausland was also a well-known jazz guitarist, having played in the band of Ole Paus among other things. From 1997 to 2001 he was the chairman of Norsk jazzforum. From 2009 he is the chairman of Norsk musikkråd.

From 1966 to 1979 he was married to Grethe Kausland. She did not revert to her maiden name Nilsen after the end of their marriage, but kept the name Kausland. Halvard Kausland later married artist Helle Brunvoll, with whom he also released the jazz albums In Our House (2009), Your Song (2012) and Latitude (2015).

Kausland died of cancer in Oslo on 21 December 2017 at the age of 72.

== Discography (in selection) ==
=== Solo albums ===
Within Kausland/Mathisen Quartet

- 2002: Good Bait (Hot Club)

With Helle Brunvoll

- 2009: In Our (Naxos)
- 2012: Your Song (Naxos)
- 2015: Latitude (Naxos)

=== Collaborations ===
With Øystein Sunde

- 1974: Ikke Bare Tyll (Philips)

With Ole Paus

- 1976: I Anstendighetens Navn (Sonet)
