= Umeå Jazz Festival =

Umeå Jazz Festival (Swedish: Umeå Jazzfestival) is an annual jazz festival held in Umeå, Sweden. The festival comprises some 30 concerts held mainly at Umeå's folkets hus and NorrlandOpera. Both Swedish and international groups and artists perform, mainly in genres related to modern jazz and improvisation. The festival had its premier in 1968. It is usually staged in October or early November.
