= Norwegian Society of Composers and Lyricists =

NOPA, the Norwegian Society of Composers and Lyricists is a society for creators of music and song lyrics in Norway. The object of the society is to promote Norwegian creative music, musical works and lyrics and other texts in musical works, strengthen professional cooperation, create meeting places and work for the members’ artistic and financial interests

It was created in 1937 as Norske populærautorer. The name has later been changed to NOPA – Norsk forening for komponister og tekstforfattere. It is a daughter organization of TONO, and a sister of the Norwegian Society of Composers. Chief administrative officer is Tine Tangestuen, while the board of directors consist of is Torgny Amdam Ine Hoem, Jan Ove Ottesen, Jørund Fluge Samuelsen, Sarah Camille Osmundsen, Tom Hugo Hermansen and Tove Bøygard. NOPA is a member of the European Composer and Songwriter Alliance (ECSA), which represents organisations of composers and songwriters across Europe..
