= Christer Fredriksen =

- Born: 15 April 1972 (age 54); Kristiansand, Vest-Agder
- Origin: Norway
- Genres: Jazz
- Occupations: Musician, composer, Jazz Guitarist
- Instrument: Guitar
- Website: www.christerfredriksen.com

Christer Fredriksen (born 15 April 1972 in Kristiansand, Norway) is a Norwegian jazz guitarist.

== Biography ==
Fredriksen is known from collaborations in a series of settings for many years. He studied music at the Agder University College with a Performing Masters in Rhythmical Music, and he has focused his research on sound, how different electric guitarists create their sound. He is a guitarist and composer with a distinctive sound and an ability to tell stories through his music.

In 2011 he released his first solo album Urban Country, with saxophonist Bendik Hofseth (Steps Ahead) as featured artist. This instrumental jazz album, with elements of other musical styles, was mixed and mastered at the Rainbow Studio in Oslo, by Jan Erik Kongshaug. The second album Trademark was released in 2014. Here he collaborates with bassist Audun Ramo and drummer Bjørn Stiauren.

== Discography ==
- 2011: Urban Country (Losen Records), feat. Bendik Hofseth
- 2014: Trademark (Losen Records)
- 2017: Vit (Losen Records)
- 2021: Mauve (monovision)
