= Øyvind Nypan =

Norwegian guitarist (born 1972)

- Born: 16 April 1972 (age 53); Trondheim
- Origin: Norway
- Occupation(s): Musician, composer
- Instrument: Guitar
- Website: nypan.com

Øyvind Nypan (born 16 April 1972) is a Kristiansand-based Norwegian guitarist and Assistant Professor at the Agder University College.

== Biography ==
Nypan was born in Trondheim, and has been active, especially in France, for several years. He released his debut album Elements (2010) on Ponca Jazz Records. The follow-up Republique (2013) was released on Ponca Jazz Records. Here he collaborates with the American saxophonist Rick Margitza, Brazilian double bassist Gael Petrina, Ecuador pianist Leonardo Montana and the Italian drummer Simone Prattico. In spite of coming from different continents these musicians give us a diecast album characterized from Nypan's American inspirations. Nypan play in a tradition of Pat Metheny and in the legacy of the legend Jim Hall.

In 2011 Nypan met with the two Trondheim based musicians Daniel Buner Formo (organ) and Truls Rønning (drums) and formed the Øyvind Nypan Trio. They released Nypan's third album Directions (2015) on his own label Nypan Music. In 2014 the fourth album Stereotomic was released on Losen Records label, now as Nypan with Bernt Moen (piano), Egil Kalman (bass), and Ole Mofjell (drums).

== Discography ==
- 2010: Elements (Ponca Jazz Records)
- 2013: Republique (Losen Records)
- 2015: Directions (Nypan Music)
- 2017: Stereotomic (Losen Records)
