= Geir Lysne =

Norwegian jazz musician and band leader

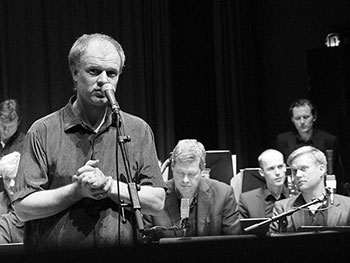
- Geir Lysne directing Aarhus Jazz Orchestra (2013)

Background information
- Born: Geir Øystein Lysne; 9 October 1965 (age 60); Trondheim, Sør-Trøndelag
- Origin: Norway
- Genre: Jazz
- Occupations: Musician, composer, conductor
- Instruments: Woodwinds (saxophones, flute)
- Label: ACT Music
- Website: www.geirlysne.com

Geir Øystein Lysne (born 9 October 1965 in Trondheim, Norway) is a Norwegian jazz musician (saxophone, flute, composer, arranger) and a famous Big Band leader.

== Career ==
Geir Lysne is a Norwegian conductor, composer, produser and teacher, educated from the Norwegian Academy of Music with jazz saxophone and composition as his main subjects. Lysne is internationally well known on the big band, wind ensemble, and partly on the classical orchestra scene. Since 2016 he has been the chief conductor of the radiojazzorchestra of Hamburg – NDR big band. Since 2013 he has been musical director for Norwegian Wind Ensemble in their 'realtime music' productions. With his unique methods in orchestra improvisation, he already has had notable success with this classical orchestra. Besides this Lysne has done hundreds of productions with twenty top professional European ensembles and radio jazz orchestras like HR big band, DR big band, DR vocal ensemble, 12 celli der Berlin Phil, UMO big band, Aarhus Jazz Orchestra, and all five Norwegian military orchestras. With his own Geir Lysne Listening Ensemble, he released six albums, the last five on the German label ACT. Boahjenásti won the German Critics Award in 2006, and was nominated for the Danish Jazz Music Award as well. His big band project with Stefano Bollani and NDR big band, released on Universal/Verve, received the Echo Jazz Award in 2013.

Besides being Professor at the Academy of Music in Oslo, Lysne was Composer in Residence at the Academy of Music in Luzern 2013–2014, and is a highly sought guest lecturer in Europe. Lysne's compositions have been played on the radio and TV in more than 30 countries, and he has also received coverage from many publications including Die Welt, Jazz Podium, Deutschlandfunk, and 3sat. He regularly works with other artists, and has been conductor/director on tour with Bobby McFerrin, Joe Lovano, Stefano Bollani, Mory Kanté, and Nils Landgren.

== Honors ==
- "Jahrespreis der Deutschen Schallplattenkritik" with the album "Boahjenásti" – with his own compositions
- Nominated for the Danish Jazz Music Award with the album "Boahjenásti"
- German Critics Award with the album "Live in Berlin" – with his own compositions
- Echo Jazz Award with the album "Bollani big band" – with his recompositions of Bollani's music, performed by Bollani, Lysne, NDR big band and Jeff Ballard.
- Spellemannprisen 1990 with Oslo Groove Company
- Nominated for the Edvardprisen (Tono)-2000 for the work "M.B." written for the Geir Lysne Listening Ensemble

== Conductor and musical director ==
As conductor Lysne has worked with a number of national and international ensembles:

- Norddeutscher Rundfunk Big Band (Hamburg)
- Hessischer Rundfunk Big Band (Frankfurt)
- Danmarks Radio big band (Copenhagen)
- UMO Jazz Orchestra (Helsinki)
- The Orchestra (Copenhagen)
- Klüvers Big Band (Aarhus)
- Det Norske Blåseensemble (Halden)
- Kristiansand Blåseensemble
- Forsvarets Stabsmusikkorps (Oslo)
- Kongelige Norske Marines Musikkorps (Horten)
- Forsvarets Musikkorps Vestlandet Bergen
- Luftforsvarets Musikkorps (Trondheim)
- Forsvarets Musikkorps Nord-Norge Harstad
- Trondheim Jazz Orchestra

== Selected discography ==
=== Solo albums ===
Geir Lysne Listening Ensemble

- 2002: Live in Berlin – Aurora Borealis (ACT)
- 2003: Korall (ACT)
- 2006: Boahjenásti – The North Star (ACT)

Geir Lysne Ensemble

- 2009: The Grieg Code (ACT)

Geir Lysne New Circle

- 2013: New Circle (ACT)

=== Collaborative works ===
- 1993: Shaken – Not Stirred (Curling Legs), with Palisander Kvartetten
- 2003: Heaven (ACT) Christof Lauer & Norwegian Brass
- 2003: Bollani Big Band (Verve/Universal)
