= Ole Mathisen =

Norwegian jazz musician and composer (born 1965)

- Born: 13 February 1965 (age 61); Sandefjord, Vestfold
- Origin: Norway
- Genres: Jazz
- Occupations: Musician, composer
- Instruments: Saxophone, clarinet, flute
- Website: olemathisen.com

Ole Mathisen (born 13 February 1965) is a Norwegian jazz musician (saxophone and clarinet) and composer. He is a critically acclaimed saxophonist and active performer on the New York City and the international jazz scene, and known for more than 80 recordings. He has performed with artists such as Paula Cole, Louie Vega, Steve Hunt, Omar Hakim, Darryl Jones, Hiram Bullock, Tom Coster, Mark Egan, Steve Smith, Mino Cinelu, Peter Erskine, Eddie Gómez, Badal Roy, Rufus Reid, Ron Carter, Grady Tate, Claudio Roditi, Will Lee, LaVerne Baker, Abraham Laboriel, Randy Brecker, Gil Goldstein, Lew Soloff, Tiger Okoshi, Michael Gibbs, Harvie Swartz, Jon Christensen, Gary Husband, Bill Bruford, Kenny Barron, Bob Moses, Jeff Berlin, Hilton Ruiz, Petter Wettre, Adam Nussbaum, Frankie Valli, and Dream Theater, and has composed music for film and television.

He is the brother of jazz musicians Per Mathisen (bass), Hans Mathisen (guitar) and Nils Mathisen (keyboards, guitar and bass).

== Career ==
Mathisen received his bachelor's degree in Professional Music from Berklee College of Music in Boston in 1988. While at Berklee he studied for three years with renowned saxophonist Joe Viola. He moved to New York City in 1993 and received a master's degree in Jazz Performance from Manhattan School of Music in 1995, studying saxophone with Bob Mintzer, arranging with Maria Schneider, and film scoring with Ed Green.

Mathisen has been regular with Chris Washburne and his Latin jazz band «SYOTOS Band» (four albums). He was the leader of the orchestra «Anomaly», and with his brothers Per (bass) and Hans Mathisen (guitar) he contributed in Chris Washburne Sextet «NYNDK» (2003–), releasing Jazzheads (2006). Mathisen has also performed with Petter Wettre and Adam Nussbaum/Francois Moutin in the production «Conspiracy».

Otherwise, he has this country contributed to releases by Hans Mathisen and Olga Konkova, and played clarinet on the concert DVD by Dream Theater in 2006.

== Honors ==
- 1984: Phil Woods Incentive Award, Berklee College of Music
- 1987: Faculty Association Award (Berklee College of Music)
- 1993: Norwegian Government
- 1999: Tono Work Stipend, Norwegian Composers Rights Organization
- 2004: Ascaplus Award, Ascap
- 2005: Ascaplus Award, Ascap
- 2006: DANY ARTS grant, awarded NYNDK
- 2007: Ascaplus Award

== Discography ==
=== Solo albums ===
With Russ Lossing, François Moutin and Tony Moreno

- 2007: Chinese Horoscope (Jazzheads)

With Tony Moreno, François Moutin and Kenny Wessel

- 2010: Periodic Table (Jazzheads)

With Per Mathisen and Paolo Vinaccia

- 2011: Elastics (Losen Records)

=== Collaborations ===
With Fernando Tarres

- 1992: On the Edges of White (Muse Records)

With Bob Moses

- 1993: Time Stood Still (Gramavision Records)

With Randy Roos

- 1993: Liquid Smoke (Narada Records)

With Mighty Sam McClain

- 1995: Keep on Movin' (Audioquest Records)
- 1999: Soul Survivor: The Best of Mighty Sam McClain (Audioquest Records)

With Ahmad Mansour

- 1995: Creatures (Gorgone Jazz), including with Terje Gewelt and Ian Froman

With Eduardo Tancredi

- 1995: Indo E Vindo (Vee Records)

With Steve Hunt

- 1997: From Your Heart and Soul (Spice Rack Records)

With Jamshied Sharifi

- 1997: A Prayer for the Soul of Layla (Alula Records)
- 2003: One (Ceres Records)

With Bruno Råberg

- 1998: Orbis (Orbis Music), including with Tim Ray (Fender Rhodes, Piano) and Bob Moses
- 2000: Presence (Orbis Music), including with Marcello Pellitteri (drums)

With Chris Washburne and the SYOTOS Band

- 1999: Nuyorican Nights (Jazzheads)
- 2001: The Other Side: El Otro Lado (Jazzheads)
- 2003: Paradise in Trouble (Jazzheads)
- 2010: Fields of Moons (Jazzheads)

With Olga Konkova

- 2001: Northern Crossings (Candid Records)

With Jiro Yoshida

- 2002: My Beating Heart (3D Records)

Within NYNDK (New York Norway Denmark)

- 2004: NYNDK (Jazzheads)
- 2007: Nordic Disruption (Jazzheads)
- 2009: The Hunting of the Snark (Jazzheads)

Within String Zone including Stig Roar Wigestrand (violin), Per Einar Watle, Øivind Wang Tollefsen (guitars), and Per Mathisen (double-bass)

- 2004: Mystery Bag (Nagel Heyer Records)

With Dream Theater

- 2006: Score: XOX - 20th Anniversary World Tour Live with the Octavarium Orchestra (Rhino/Warner Bros.)

With Stevie Holland

- 2006: More Than Words Can Say (150 Music)
- 2008: Before Love Has Gone (150 Music)

With Chris Washburne

- 2006: Land of Nod (Jazzheads)

With Hans Mathisen

- 2006: Quiet songs (Curling Legs), including with Johannes Eick and Per Mathisen (bass), Gary Husband and Per Oddvar Johansen (drums), and Olga Konkova (piano)

With Mamak Khadem

- 2007: Jostojoo Forever Seeking (Banyan Tree/Mamak Khadem)

With Keiko Lee

- 2007: In Essence (Ais/Sony Music)

With Amir ElSaffar

- 2011: Inana (Pi Recordings)
- 2013: Alchemy (Pi Recordings)

Within FFEAR including with Chris Washburne (Composer, trombone), Per Mathisen (bass)

- 2012: Mirage (Jazzheads)

=== Film music ===
With Michael Gibbs Original Soundtrack

- 1996: Hard Boiled (Fine Line), a John Woo Film
