= Helge Sunde =

Norwegian composer and musician (born 1965)

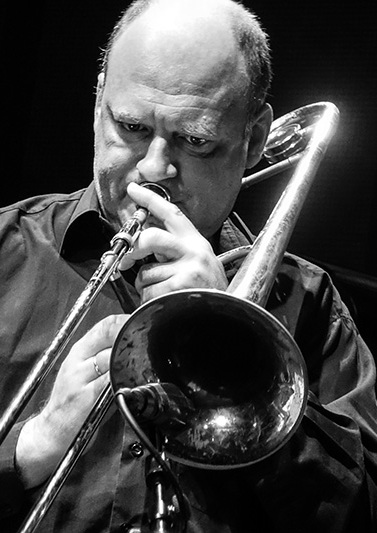
- Helge Sunde at Reykjavik Jazz Festival, 2015

Background information
- Born: 9 June 1965 (age 61); Stryn Municipality, Sogn og Fjordane
- Origin: Norway
- Genres: Jazz
- Occupations: Musician, composer
- Instruments: Trombone, multi instrumentalist
- Member of: Ensemble Denada
- Website: www.helgesunde.com

Helge Sunde (born 9 June 1965) is a Norwegian composer and musician (trombone and multi-instrumentalist), known for his compositions in contemporary music and jazz for large ensembles and for his works as music arranger for symphony orchestras in collaboration with artists.

== Career ==
Sunde was born in Stryn Municipality, and has a diploma in composition from the Norwegian Academy of Music (1995) in Oslo, where he studied under guidance of Olav Anton Thommessen, Bjørn Kruse, Lasse Thoresen and Alfred Janson. His diploma work Festina lente is available on the album Absolute Pling-Plong: Eight ways of making music, performed by the BIT20 Ensemble. During his studies he was awarded "Work of the Year" by NOPA (now Edvardprisen), together with Anneli Drecker and Nils Johansen from the band Bel Canto, for the work "Tierre Obletz" (1993). Sunde was awarded the Spellemannprisen 1990 within the band Oslo Groove Company, and was also nominated within Sharp9 (2004), as well as within Norske Store Orkester (2006) as Sunde also is musical director for (2005–).

His compositions has been written for and performed by ensembles like Kringkastingsorkesteret, Stavanger Symphony Orchestra, Bergen Filharmoniske Orkester, Oslo Sinfonietta He has also contributed to the show "Barnas Supershow" on Norwegian television NRK. Sunde collaborates in the Ophelia Orchestra and has contributed to releases by Ole Paus (Biggle's testamente, 1992), Motorpsycho (Let'em eat cake, 2000) and Trygve Seim (Sangam, 2004).

== Honors ==
- 1990: Spellemannprisen in the class "Jazz" for the album Anno 1990, within the band Oslo Groove Company
- 1993: NOPA's award (now Edvardprisen) in the class "Work of the Year" for the work "Tierre Obletz", together with the Bel Canto musicians Anneli Drecker and Nils Johansen
- 2010 Echo Jazz Award (German Grammy) for The album Finding Nymo
- 2011 Spellemansprisen i folkemusikk for "Never on a Sunday" with Ragnhild Furebotn as producer, arranger and musician.
- 2013: Edvardprisen in the "Open class" for the album Windfall

== Discography ==
With Kringkastingsorkesteret

- 2006: Rotations (Aurora)

With Ensemble Denada

- 2007: Denada (ACT).
- 2009: Finding Nymo (ACT).
- 2013: Windfall (Ocella)

With Eberhard Weber

- Hommage à Eberhard Weber (ECM, 2015) - conductor

Awards
Preceded by Kjell Samkopf	Recipient of the open class Edvardprisen; 2013	Succeeded by Christian Blom
