= Barcelona Municipal Band =

Founded in 1886 by Barcelona City Council, the Barcelona Municipal Band is a musical institution going back a long way. Since 2007, it has been the resident band at the Barcelona Auditorium (L'Auditori), where it offers a fixed season of concerts and where it develops projects in partnership with artists and groups forming part of the international scene as well as those from the local sphere. The resident conductor since 2008 has been the Catalan composer and conductor Salvador Brotons.

== History ==
=== Precedents: 14th to 20th centuries ===
There are records going back to the 14th century of the presence of instrumental groups accompanying official municipal events and celebrations in Barcelona, often under the name of ‘city music’. The trumpets and drums bore the coat of arms of the city and formed part of the entourage of the City Hall authorities. On special occasions, it hired the services of different groups of minstrels, whose function was more to amuse and entertain the public. These musical groups of varying size livened up important celebrations and dates in the city. The earliest mention of them dates from 29 August 1361, when King Peter IV of Aragon ordered five minstrels to attend the arrival of the Infanta of Sicily in the city of Barcelona.

Accounts of performances by groups playing wind instruments in the city abound throughout the 15th and 16th centuries and we even have information about the first steps in the professionalization of Barcelona's musicians with the founding on 13 July 1599 of the first Musicians’ Guild of Barcelona. Throughout the 17th and 18th century we find a variety of documents that speak of regular relations between groups of musicians and the local corporation. The city council set out to strengthen these regular but shaky relations by setting up its own band of music, something that took place at the end of the 19th century.

=== The Band’s beginnings: its creation ===
A formation of great importance in society at the time of its foundation, its purpose was to bring the music of the great composers within reach of the lower classes at a time when this art was reserved for members of the better-off classes. At the start of the late modern period, the city council decided to regularise the situation of municipal music. Since 1837 there had been attempts to set the band up as an independent formation, but this did not happen until 2 March 1886, when it became definitive. It was decided that Barcelona City Council's Municipal Orchestra and Band and the Municipal Music School should be founded at the same time, in a determined policy to professionalise the world of music and make it more stable. The post of Conductor of the band, which was to go hand in hand with that of Head of the Music School, was at first held by Josep Rodoreda i Santigós, a well-known Barcelona musician of the time. Initial contacts with the public were a success and the new band was enthusiastically received. The city council built a bandstand in Parc de la Ciutadella so that the band could give concerts on Sundays in summer, while in winter they were held on the corner of Passeig de Gràcia and Gran Via de les Corts Catalanes. These were short concerts with brilliantly orchestratations of pieces by the composers in vogue: Richard Wagner, Felix Mendelssohn, Jules Massenet, Giacomo Meyerbeer, etc.

=== The Period of Renown: Lamote de Grignon’s band ===
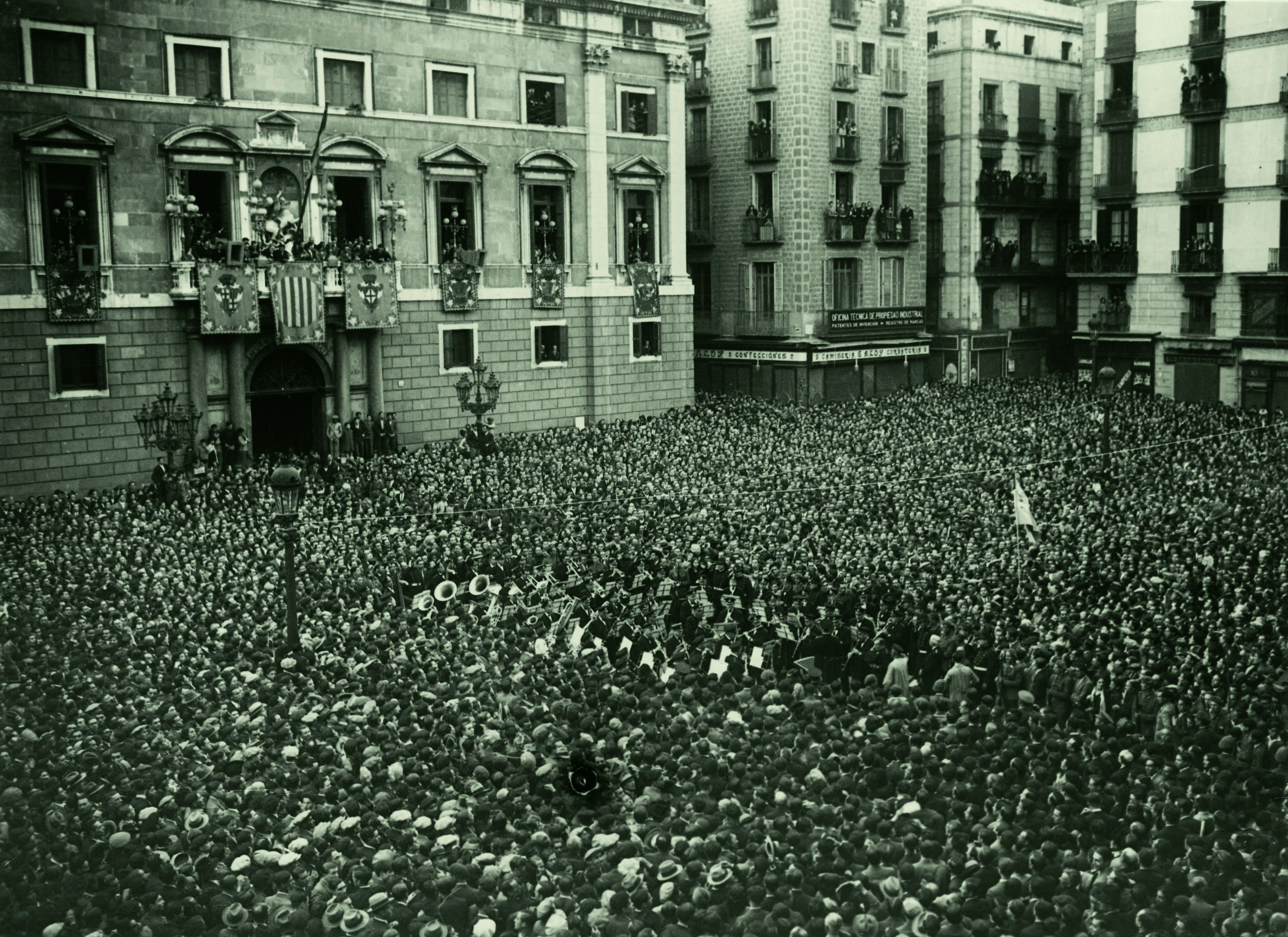
The Barcelona Municipal Band playing in Plaça Sant Jaume during the Proclamation of the Second Spanish Republic (Photo: Josep Maria Sagarra, 1931).

At the start of the 20th century it became a well-known institution everywhere. At that time it was directed by Joan Lamote de Grignon, who in 1951 managed to make the band independent from the city's Music School (today's Municipal Conservatory of Barcelona). It was during this time that it was visited –and even conducted– by great names in music such as Richard Strauss and others. After the days of Rodoreda's baton as the Band's first conductor, other names came and went, such as Antoni Nicolau (1896 -1897), Celestí Sadurní i Gurguí (1897-1910) and Cristòfol Casanyé (1910 -1914). But it was under Joan Lamote de Grignon that substantial improvements were put forward in the way the institution was organised and structured (such as changes in venues, rehearsal rooms of its own, independence from the Music School, better working conditions for the musicians and a larger and better balanced line-up, measures that were soon reflected in the institution's artistic quality.

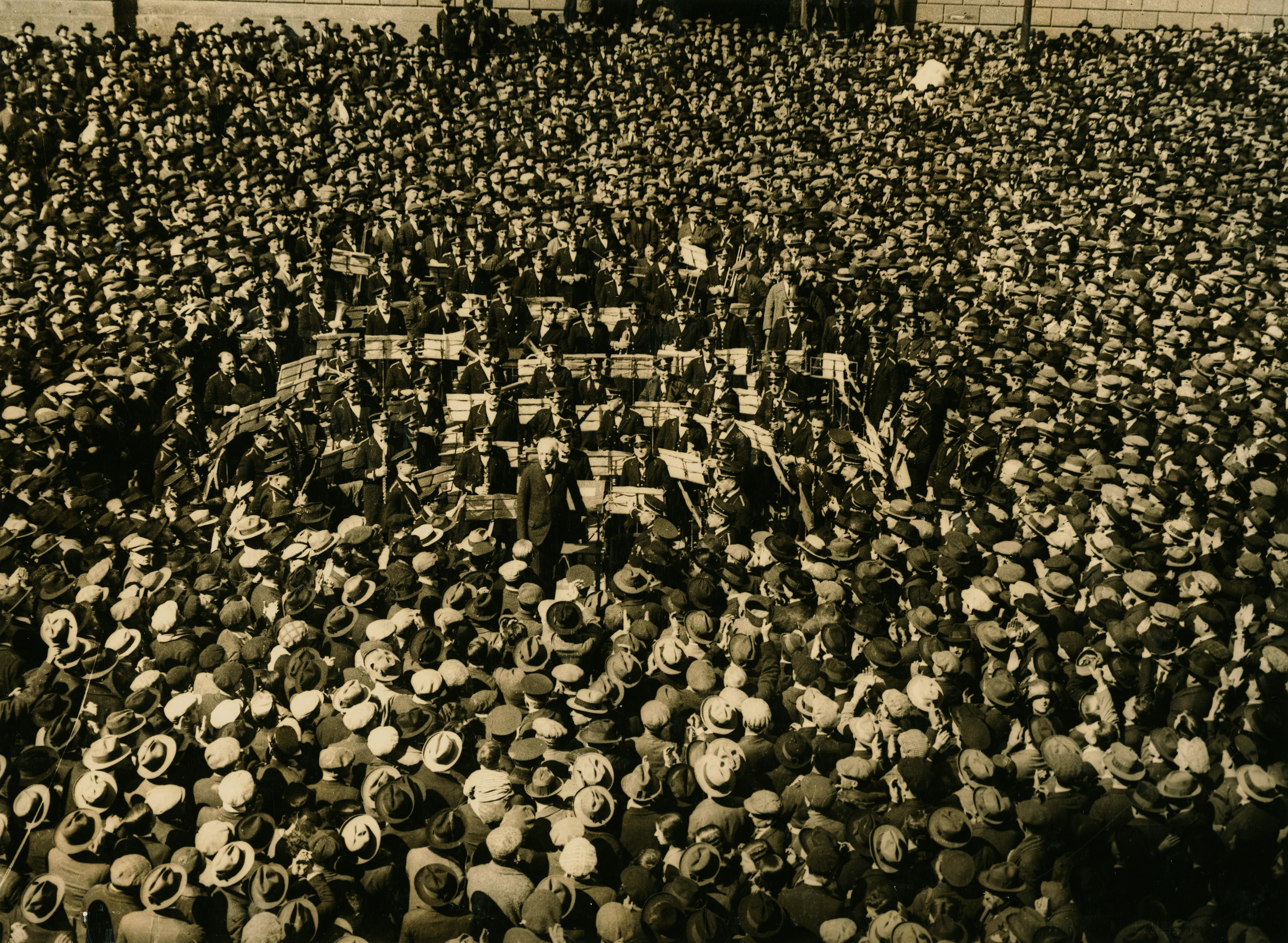
The Barcelona Municipal Band is conducted by Richard Strauss in Barcelona's Plaça Sant Jaume (Photo: Josep Dominguez, 1925).

Contemporary accounts speak of a resurgence, of excellence and of the public's pride in its Municipal Band. One event that speaks for the great artistic moment the institution was experiencing was the concert given by the composer and conductor Richard Strauss in Plaça Sant Jaume on 19 March 1925. Strauss, who was in the city on a visit, heard the band at a concert in Plaça del Rei and was struck by the high quality of the group. The German composer asked if he could conduct the band at a public concert and invited the institution to take part in the International Music Exhibition in Frankfurt in 1927, where it gave eight concerts and was a notable success with the critics. Under Lamote de Grignon, the band began what were called the People's Symphonic Concerts (Conciertos Sinfónicos Populares), with two performances by the group at the Barcelona International Exposition in 1929. People's Symphonic Concerts was the title of a series of Sunday concerts given at the Palace of Fine Arts, built for the Barcelona Universal Exhibition of 1888, where the band also appeared regularly. Out of the series of these annual concerts, one or two were usually given over to the young music students at the municipal schools and should be seen as a pioneering pedagogic and educational initiative in the city. The famous Catalan pianist Alicia de Larrocha played as a soloist with the Barcelona Municipal Band in 1934, when she was only twelve, at the 80th People's Symphonic Concert.

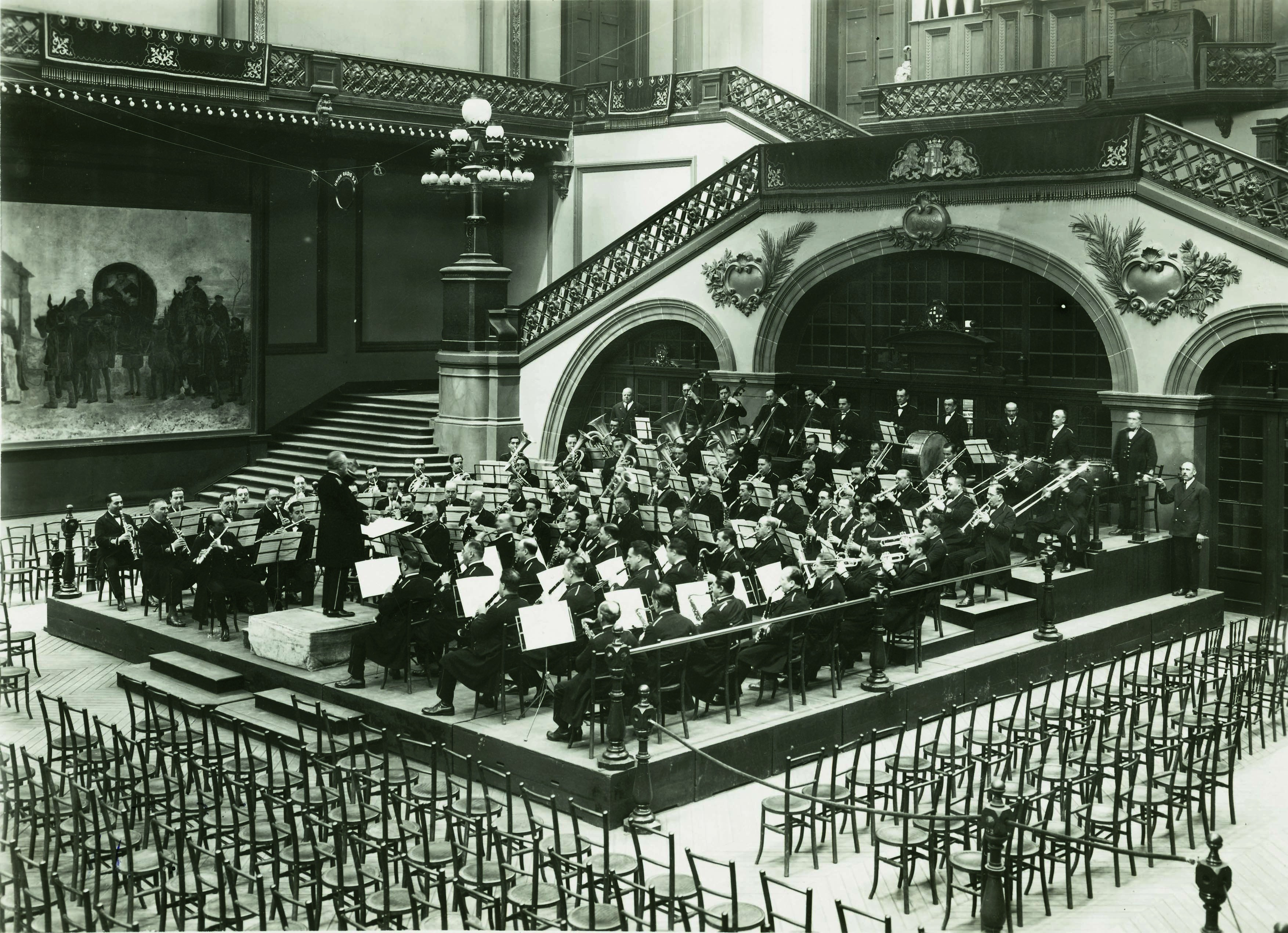
The Barcelona Municipal Band with its leader Joan Lamote de Grignon, at the Palace of Fine Arts in Barcelona (Photo: Jaume Ribera, 1927).

Joan Lamote de Grignon headed the band for 24 years, during which time it reached exceptional technical and artistic heights and put down firm institutional and social roots. In spite of this, on 29 January 1939, three days after Franco's troops entered the new nationalist Barcelona, a field mass in Plaça Catalunya marked the start of the period of purges the band suffered as a public body. In June, Joan Lamote de Grignon was sacked from his post –the same as Ricard Lamote de Grignon, who was the assistant conductor– and a gloomy period of austerity began for the band

=== The long post-war years ===
The political and social situation in Barcelona in the mid-20th century had a profound effect on the city's artistic and cultural sector, which before the Spanish Civil War had enjoyed a period of flourishing creativity. As a public institution, the Municipal Band suffered the cuts and the lack of funds that marked the Franco regime's period of autarky. In June 1943, the Barcelona City Council began a process to convert the Municipal Band into the Municipal Orchestra of Barcelona. This was completed in March 1944, with the formation of what today is called the Barcelona Symphony and Catalonia National Orchestra. Despite this initial break-up and reduction of the group, along with the political situation at that time, the band managed to survive these tough decades thanks to the work of musicians and conductors such as Ramon Bonell i Chanut (1939-1955), Ricard Lamote de Grignon (1955-1957) –the son of Joan Lamote de Grignon and former assistant conductor of the band–, Joan Pich i Santasusana (1957-1967), Josep González (1967-1969) and Enric Garcés Garcés (1969 -1979).

=== The transition and return to democracy ===
The almost three decades from the end of the 1970s to the band's taking up residence at the Barcelona Auditorium (L'Auditori) were directed by Francesc Elias i Prunera (1979-1980), Albert Argudo i Lloret (1980-1993) and Josep Mut (1993-2007). During this period, the band resumed its activity in the city, giving concerts in the districts and continuing its official activity for the City Hall. Despite the political and institutional misfortunes, the band went on offering the city of Barcelona its musical services, regularly changing its headquarters (from the Aliança de Poblenou to the Casinet d’Hostafrancs and the Cotxeres de Sants), until it finally came to rest in the Auditorium.

=== The Municipal Band and the Barcelona Auditorium (L'Auditori) ===
Since 2007, the band has been resident at the Barcelona Auditorium, where it performs a fixed season of concerts with the collaboration of various guest conductors and soloists from the international scenario as well as from local spheres. Coinciding with the band's arrival at this facility, the Catalan composer and conductor Salvador Brotons i Soler took the baton and continues to head the band today. His work has strengthened the commitment to contemporary creations and works have been commissioned from active composers in a move to further the dissemination of Catalan music. The band's own repertory has also been increased to bring this music closer to the public. Today, the Barcelona Municipal Band is a formation committed to the society it forms part of, a participant in its age and an active protagonist on the Barcelona music scene.

=== The present ===
The band has become an essential part of the city's music scene and never fails to take part in all the important events in the city, such as La Mercè, the Festival Grec de Barcelona, the Festival Mas i Mas, the Cycle of Music in the Parks, the National Day of Catalonia, Saint Eulàlia's Day and others. The band has been involved in community projects of an educational type, holding concerts for schools and families in collaboration with L’Auditori Educa and L’Auditori Apropa. The band offers a fixed season of concerts at the Barcelona L'Auditori. This is a long-term programme with guest conductors and musicians, in which the band puts on a wide-ranging offer of music.

== Conductors ==
The following are the conductors who have headed the institution during its history:

- Josep Rodoreda i Santigós (1886-1895)
- Antoni Nicolau (1896-1897)
- Celestí Sadurní i Gurguí (1897-1910)
- Cristòfol Casanyé (1910-1914)
- Joan Lamote de Grignon (1914-1939)
- Ramon Bonell i Chanut (1939-1955)
- Ricard Lamote de Grignon (1955-1957)
- Joan Pich i Santasusana (1957-1967)
- Josep González (1967-1969)
- Enric Garcés Garcés (1969-1979)
- Francesc Elias i Prunera (1979-1980)
- Albert Argudo i Lloret (1980-1993)
- Josep Mut (1993-2007)
- Joan Lluís Moraleda i Perxachs (2007-2008, assistant conductor)
- Jordi Moraleda i Perxachs (2007-2008, assistant conductor)
- Rafael Grimal Olmos (2007-2008, assistant conductor)
- Salvador Brotons i Soler (2008- )
- Marta Carretón (2008-2010, assistant conductor)
- Juan Miguel Romero (2010-2014, assistant conductor)
- Henrie Adams (2014–present, assistant conductor)

== Débuts and commissions by the Barcelona Municipal Band ==
The Barcelona Municipal Band has always maintained its firm commitment to contemporary musical creation in Catalonia. Recently, for its 125th anniversary, it commissioned a series of works which it performed for the first time in public. This drive has persisted to this day and it still débuts works by Catalan composers every season. To illustrate this attitude, these are some of the pieces it has debuted in recent years:

Composer	Works
Josep Alamà Gil	Anaphorisms for Symphonic Band
Joan Albert Amargós i Altisent	Thematic games for symphonic band
Lleonard Balada i Ibáñez	Concerto for viola and wind instruments
Salvador Brotons i Soler	Concerto for double bass and wind instruments
Jordi Cervelló	Concerto for piano, wind instruments and percussion
Elisenda Fábregas	Symphony No. 1
Joan Guinjoan Gispert	Bird fire (New version)
Albert Guinovart	The hands of the wind concerto for piano and symphonic band
José Rafael Pascual Vilaplana	Hernandiana
Jesús Rodríguez Picó	Symphonies for wind instruments and percussion

== Partnerships ==
The Barcelona Municipal Band has partnered with musicians of acknowledged international renown throughout its long history. Some of the people who have recently worked with the band are the conductors:

- Felix Hauswirth
- Jan Cober
- Walter Ratzek
- Franz-Paul Decker
- Andrés Valero Castells
- Manel Valdivieso
- Rafael Sanz Espert
- Arturo Tamayo
- José R. Pascual Vilaplana

The soloists:

- Stefan Schilli, oboe
- Yukiko Akagi, piano
- Shoichiro Hokazono, euphonium
- Arno Bornkamp, saxophone
- Jesús Santandreu, saxophone
- Àlex Alguacil, piano
- Ximo Vicedo, trombone
- Marta Matheu, soprano
- Albert Guinovart, piano
- Enrique Bagaría, piano

Other collaborators include:

- Carles Santos, composer
- Coral Cantiga, Coral Sant Jordi, Coral Càrmina
- Spanish Brass Luur Metalls
- Gelabert-Azzopardi dance company
- Lloll Bertran, actress
- Sol Picó, choreographer

== Discography ==
The Barcelona Municipal Band has been keen to resume recordings of part of its repertory. It has added to its long recording history with new titles in recent years such as: Joan i Ricard de Grignon. Obres per banda simfònica (2013) (Joan and Ricard de Grignon. Works for symphonic band) and the recording of part of the work written for symphonic bands by its present resident conductor, Salvador Brotons, for the Naxos Records international label, to be released in 2015.

== Bibliography ==
Recommended reading about the Barcelona Municipal Band:

- ALMACELLAS I DÍEZ, JOSEP Mª. Banda Municipal de Barcelona: 1886-1944. Del carrer a la sala de concerts. (Doctoral thesis, director of the thesis: Xosé Aviñoa Barcelona University. Faculty of Geography and History. Department of History of Art), 2003.
- ALMACELLAS I DÍEZ, JOSEP Mª. La Banda Municipal. Del carrer a la sala de concerts, 1886-1945. Barcelona: Arxiu Municipal de Barcelona, 2006.
- AVIÑOA, XOSÉ. Història de la Música Catalana, Valencia i Balear. Diccionari I-Z, (Vol. IX), Edicions 62, Barcelona, 2003, p. 26.
- BONASTRE, FRANCESC. The Barcelona Municipal Band: cent anys de música ciutadana. Ajuntament de Barcelona, 1989.
- CABALLÉ I CLOS, TOMÀS. La Música oficial de la ciudad de Barcelona: apuntes para la historia de la Banda Municipal. Barcelona: Ariel, 1946.
- GONZÁLEZ LAPUENTE, A. (Ed.). Historia de la Música en España e Hispano-América. La Música en España en el siglo XX. Madrid, Fondo de Cultura Económica, 2012.
- PÉREZ I VALLVERDÚ, EULÀLIA. La política cultural municipal de l'etapa de l'alcalde Miguel Mateu i Pla (1939-1945): aspectes generals. Barcelona: Fundació Carles Pi i Sunyer, 2010. ‘Àmbit Musical: Banda Municipal’, pp. 49–50.
- BASSEGODA NONELL, Juan. ‘El discurso wagneriano del maestro Rodoreda’. Wagneriana Castellana, No. 34, 1999.
- TEIXIDÓ I COROMINAS, Enric. ‘Compositors catalans: Celestí Sadurní i Gurgui (1863-1910)’. Wagneriana catalana No. 31, 2009.
