= Salvador Brotons =

Catalan composer, flutist and conductor

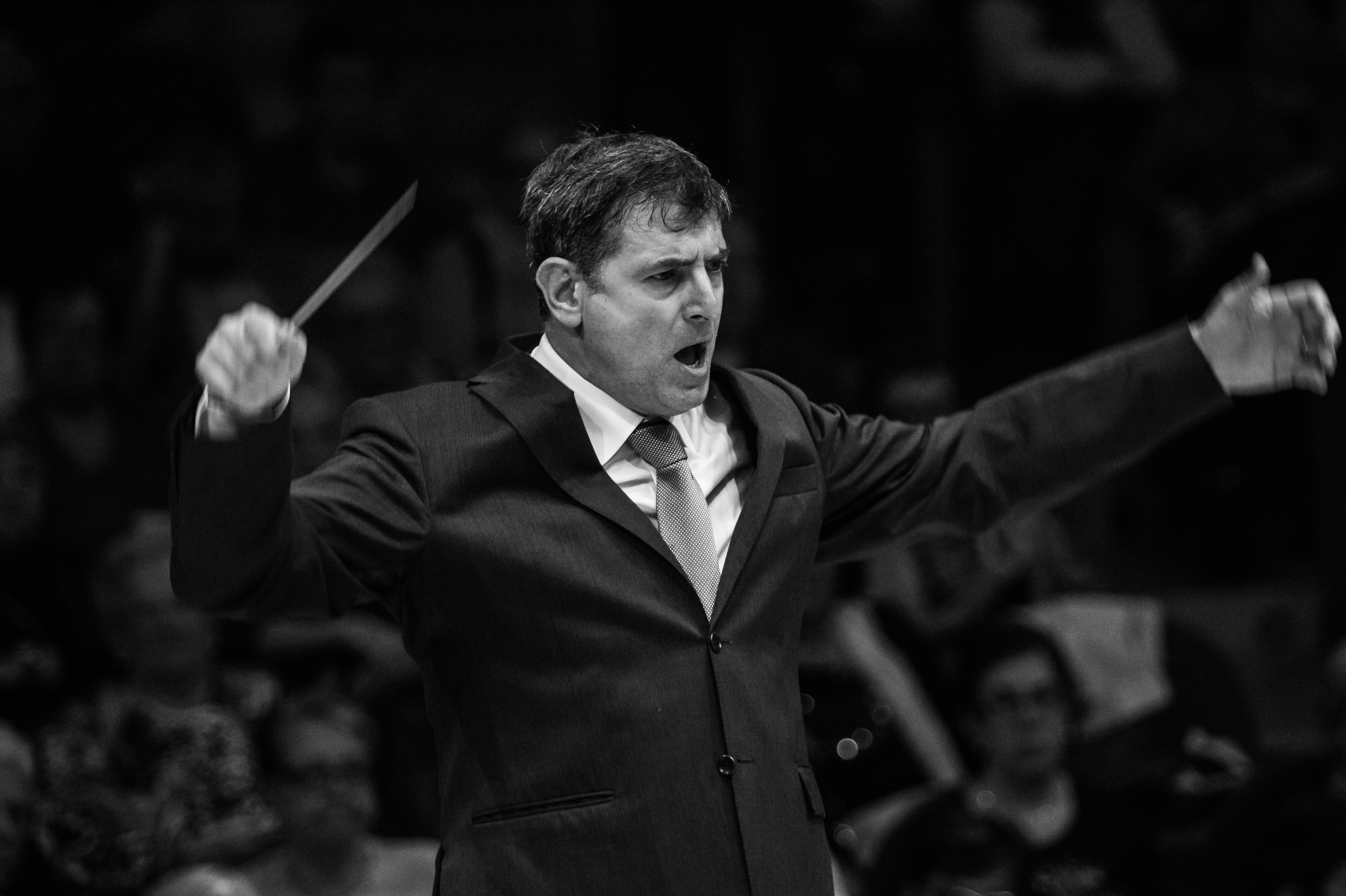
- Brotons in 2013

Background information
- Born: 17 July 1959; Barcelona
- Genres: Symphony, concerto, chamber, cantata, opera
- Occupations: Composer, flautist, conductor
- Member of: Vancouver Symphony Orchestra, principal director (1991-); Orquestra Simfònica del Vallès, principal director (1997 – 2002); Orquestra Simfònica Illes Balears, principal director (1998 – 2002) (2009 – 2013); Banda Municipal de Barcelona, principal director (2008 – 2018); Orquestra Simfònica Sant Cugat, principal director (2022-)
- Website: www.salvadorbrotons.com

Salvador Brotons (born 17 July 1959) is a Catalan composer, conductor, and flautist. He is the conductor of the Vancouver Symphony Orchestra in Vancouver, Washington and, since the 2022-2023 season, has also been the principal conductor of the Orquestra Simfònica Sant Cugat.

Salvador Brotons is a contemporary Catalan composer, with a repertoire performed worldwide. As a composer, he has written more than 170 works, including symphonic, concertante, chamber, choral music, operas, sardanes, and even a children's story. Faithful to his language, he has maintained melody and tonality, without atonality to condition his style. As a conductor, with an international career, he conveys passion to both musicians and audiences. His work as a conductor has also involved programming responsibilities, and in this regard, Brotons has always balanced major works from the international repertoire with compositions by contemporary Catalan musicians.

== Biography ==
=== Youth ===
Brotons was born in Barcelona into a family of musicians; his father, Josep Maria Brotons (piccolo player of the Orquestra de Barcelona), and his grandfather, Salvador, both played the flute. His father was his first flute teacher. He studied at the Municipal Conservatory of Barcelona, where he earned advanced degrees in flute, composition, and orchestral conducting. There, he was influenced by renowned masters such as Antoni Ros-Marbà in conducting, Xavier Montsalvatge in composition, and Manuel Oltra in orchestration.

During the 1970s, Brotons developed an interest in composition at just 14 years old, primarily writing works for solo instruments and small ensembles. Notable examples from this period include Ideals utòpics and Tres peces breus for piano, as well as Dues suggestions for guitar. In 1975, he composed Elegia per a la mort de Xostakóvitx, Op. 7, a piano work reflecting his admiration for Russian nationalist music and, in particular, for Shostakovich. This influence is evident in elements such as a strong rhythmic language, obsessive note repetitions, and harmonies featuring minor seconds, fourths, and fifths. These characteristics converge in one of his first major works, Quatre peces per a cordes, Op. 14 (1977), which at just eighteen years old earned him his first major recognition: the Premio Orquesta Nacional de España. This award led to the inclusion of the work in the orchestra's concert season.

The day after the Catalan premiere of Quatre peces per a cordes, Xavier Montsalvatge wrote in La Vanguardia: "Salvador Brotons possesses three qualities that rarely coincide: he is young—20 years old—, he is already an outstanding professional (a flutist and a member of a family of musicians), and he is brave, sincere, and artistically honest... In these pieces, one can perceive interesting harmonic discoveries that timidly escape tonality, as well as a constructive sense that reveals a gifted composer, capable of facing the future with greater determination, especially after the success achieved, confirmed by the long and unanimous applause."

In 1977, he won the position of principal flute of the Orquestra Simfònica del Gran Teatre del Liceu (1977–1985), and in 1981, he secured the role of second flute in the Barcelona Symphony Orchestra and National Orchestra of Catalonia (1981–1985), holding both positions simultaneously while balancing his studies and his emerging career as a composer. Locally, he was becoming a sought-after flutist.

In December 1979, Brotons unanimously received the first prize awarded by Jeunesses Musicales International de Barcelona for young composers with his work Simetries for violin, clarinet, and piano.

In 1983, he was awarded the Premi Ciutat de Barcelona for his first symphony. The following year, his Second Symphony received the runner-up prize in the Robert Gerhard symphonic music award by the Generalitat de Catalunya, as the first prize was not granted. According to Montsalvatge, "Brotons stands out for the confidence in his writing, the logic of his four-movement structure, and the perfect technical command evident in his orchestration. Perhaps it lacks a more innovative intent, and some direct influences, especially from Bartók, can be detected."

=== Doctorate in Florida ===
After a period of intense work and study in Catalonia, Brotons had the opportunity to further his education in the United States. In 1985, Carl Bjerregaard, a professor of Chamber Winds at Florida State University, was traveling through Europe in search of wind music when he discovered Brotons in Barcelona after hearing the Banda Municipal perform one of his works. Interested in his music, Bjerregaard offered him a Fulbright Scholarship to study in the United States—an opportunity the 24-year-old composer seized to pursue a doctorate in music. This became a major turning point in his career. He had recently married Melissa Mercadal, and the couple decided that gaining experience abroad would be beneficial.

At Florida State University, Brotons studied flute with Charles DeLaney, but soon realized that composition was where he excelled the most compared to his peers. He then pursued a doctorate in conducting and composition—a decision that would become a pivotal moment in his artistic career. Before long, he began receiving significant opportunities in both composition and conducting. His first commission from Chamber Winds led him to compose Sinfonietta da camera for wind ensemble and percussion, which he conducted at its premiere at Florida State University in February 1986, to great acclaim.

In November 1985, his work Jan rara micant sidera premiered in Brussels, a commission from the Europalia Festival, where it received an outstanding reception.

During his studies in Florida, Brotons served as an assistant conductor for the Florida State University Symphony Orchestra (1986–1987). During this time, he composed several works, some as assignments for his courses, intended for increasingly larger chamber ensembles. In Tallahassee, he deepened his understanding of each instrument’s capabilities, and his music evolved towards greater formal solidity, more refined timbral combinations, and a clear, structured exposition. An example of this approach is his Trio for Violin, Cello, and Piano, Op. 39 (1986).

In February 1987, he was awarded the Premi Ciutat de Barcelona for music for his work Absències, Op. 40, for narrator and orchestra. Brotons based the piece on thirteen poems by Miquel Martí i Pol, taken from his collection Llibre d'absències.

=== Conductor in Portland ===
In 1987, Brotons moved to Portland, Oregon, where he resided for ten years and was appointed conductor of the Portland State University Orchestra (1987–1997). Out of approximately two hundred applicants, only three were selected for the final auditions, after which Brotons secured the position. In Portland, he also taught counterpoint, orchestral conducting, music literature, and history. During this period, he composed the Piano Quartet in E major, Op. 48 A Celebration of Living (1988), a significant work in his catalog, commissioned by a private patron. Other notable works from this time include Sextet mixt, Fusió, and Virtus, Op. 53, which won an award in the United States and was later orchestrated, earning the prestigious Queen Sofía Composition Prize in 1991.

In 1989, Brotons composed the two-act opera Reverend Everyman on commission from Florida State University. The opera was later broadcast on American television. It is considered one of his most ambitious and dramatic works, receiving both critical and audience acclaim.

During his years in Portland, Brotons also served as the principal conductor of the Oregon Sinfonietta (1990–1993) and the Mittleman Jewish Community Orchestra (1989–1991).

=== Conductor in Vancouver ===
Since 1991, Brotons has served as the principal conductor of the Vancouver Symphony Orchestra in Washington State. Under his leadership, he received the "Arts Council" award from Clark County and the City of Vancouver. Brotons has led the orchestra since 1991, during which the ensemble expanded its audience, resources, and artistic activities.

During this period, Brotons expanded his repertoire to include larger orchestral and choral works. Notable compositions from this time include the symphonic poems Phaedo and Liliana. The latter premiered with narration by renowned Spanish singer-songwriter Joan Manuel Serrat.

=== Between the United States and Catalonia ===
Brotons’ temporary return to Catalonia allowed him to strengthen ties with his homeland, accepting significant commissions and establishing himself professionally. In Barcelona, his music gained prominence in the classical scene, with frequent premieres and increasing recognition. His desire to promote his work led him to create multiple versions of his compositions, making them more accessible through arrangements for different ensembles and piano reductions, facilitating their diffusion and programming.

Brotons sought to reinforce the connection between his music and Catalan tradition, drawing inspiration from the folk music collections of the 20th century. This sense of national identity and love for the Catalan language were already evident in his early works. His first major piece reflecting a Mediterranean and Catalan style, Terres llemosines, was composed in Portland in 1992, but it was not introduced to the public until the following year with the Orquestra Simfònica del Vallès.

In 1996, Brotons began conducting a series of concerts with this orchestra, and in 1997, he was appointed its principal conductor, a position he held until 2002. In 1998, he was also named principal conductor of the Orquestra Simfònica Illes Balears (1998–2001). As a result, Brotons simultaneously led three orchestras.

Following his stays in the Catalan Countries, a distinctly Catalan flavor became increasingly evident in his works. Brotons demonstrates a remarkable ability to integrate traditional melodies into his own musical language while maintaining his distinctive style. This fusion not only reinforces his musical identity but also enhances his connection with audiences, making his contemporary music more accessible and appealing.

In this regard, not only do his Six Catalan Rhapsodies follow these principles, but so do his concertos for solo instruments and orchestra, such as the Mare Nostrum Guitar Concerto and the Concert Trobadoresc Cello Concerto. The same approach is evident in large-scale vocal works such as the cantata Oda a Verdaguer and Abans del silenci (Chronicle of the Unió Liberal. 1887-1936), a staged cantata in two acts incorporating well-known melodies like El rossinyol and L'Hereu Riera. A similar approach is found in the Concert Catalanesc (2006) for solo tenora, symphony orchestra, and optional cobla.

Starting from the 1999-2000 season, under Brotons’ direction, the Vallès Symphony Orchestra increased its presence at the Palau de la Música, performing at least four concerts.

Throughout his career, and especially during this period, Brotons was committed to promoting and including Catalan composers in his concert programs. At the same time, the Vallès Symphony Orchestra, under his leadership, was achieving great public success with the Symphonic Concerts at the Palau series. The results, considered spectacular by the organizers, led to an expansion of the number of performances starting from the 2000-2001 season, reaching a total of eleven.

In December 2000, Brotons premiered Stabat Mater, op. 73, at L'Auditori, which caused a sensation and was warmly received by the large audience in attendance. In 2002, he left the Vallès Symphony Orchestra and the Balearic Islands Symphony Orchestra. Brotons' tenure as conductor of both orchestras brought respect and confidence, both internally and externally, among the orchestra members, leading to a significant qualitative leap. For his final concert as principal conductor of the Vallès Symphony Orchestra on 22 June 2002, Brotons chose Shostakovich’s Fifth Symphony, one of his favorite works.

In 2001, together with his brother-in-law Juanjo Mercadal, Brotons founded the publishing house Brotons & Mercadal Edicions Musicals S.L., dedicated to promoting works by contemporary composers and reviving high-quality pieces that had fallen into obscurity. The main goal of the publishing house is not profit but ensuring that the works are performed.

On 5 April 2003, Brotons premiered the Concert Trobadoresc for cello and orchestra, op. 90, with Lluís Claret as the soloist. This ambitious work requires the soloist to fully showcase their abilities and is based on ancient songs by Provençal and Occitan troubadours. In May, Brotons premiered the cantata El viatge de Kira i Jan o l'arbre de les llengües with texts by Susanna Rafart. The work was performed by a total of 11,609 children from 282 Catalan schools in 19 concerts.

In 2008, Brotons accepted the position of conductor of the Barcelona Municipal Band, coinciding with the band's relocation to L'Auditori. He led the ensemble for eleven years. The following year, in 2009, he returned to conduct the Orquestra Simfònica Illes Balears after eight years, now with a much more consolidated project and a significantly improved and well-established ensemble. He continued in this role until 2013.

On 13 March 2011, his Fifth Symphony, Mundus Noster, Op. 117, premiered at L'Auditori. The work is characterised by an intimate and lyrical quality, with clear inspiration and an intense, vibrant palette of musical resources. Despite its substantial length, it displays great structural solidity and compositional mastery.

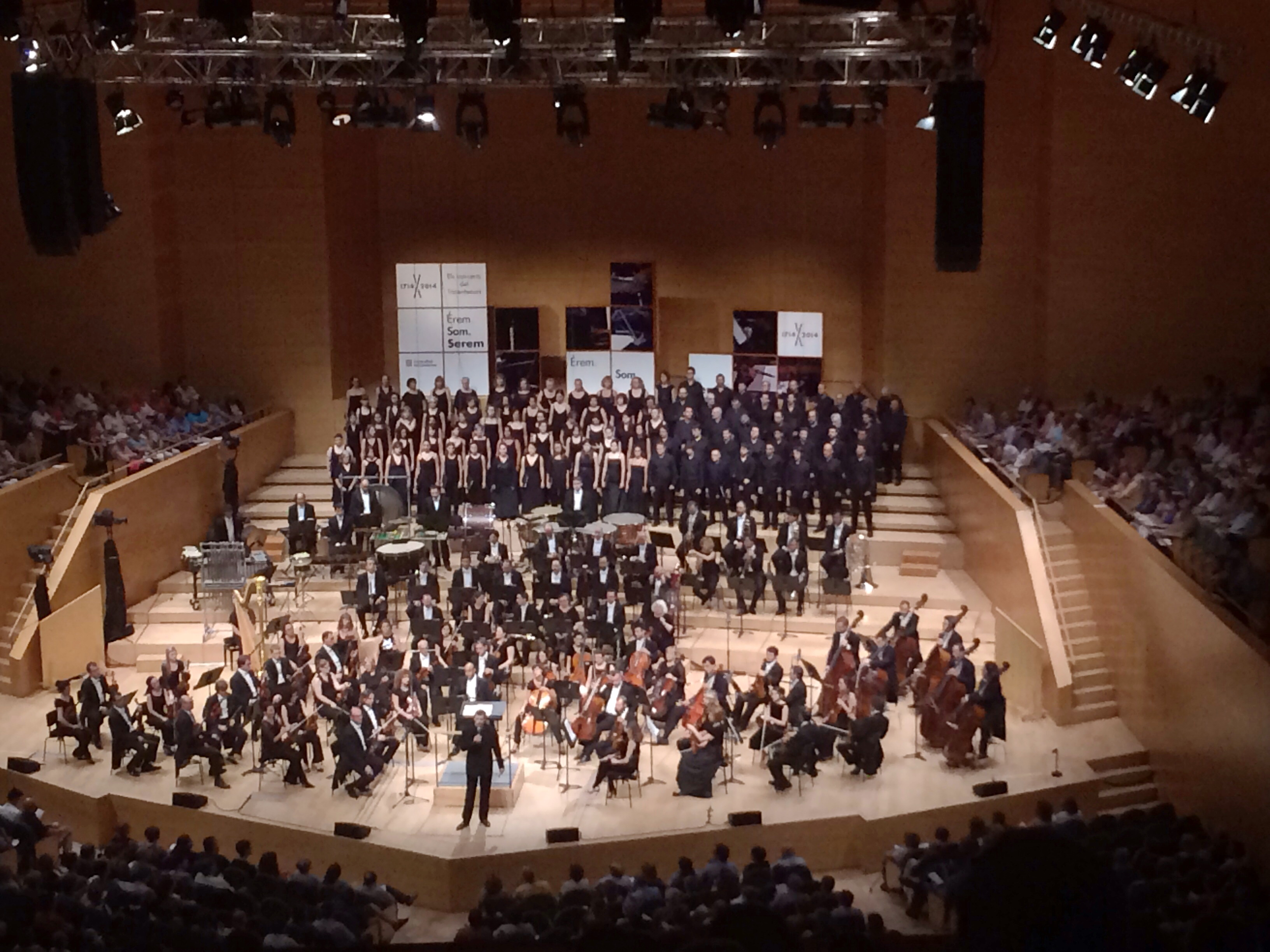
Salvador Brotons presenting his composition Catalunya 1714 on the day of its premiere with the Barcelona Symphony and Catalonia National Orchestra and guest choirs

On 19 July 2014, the symphonic poem Catalunya 1714 premiered as part of the 1714-2014 Tricentennial events. The work is structured in eight sections, outlining a chronology that includes the period leading up to the Siege of Barcelona in 1714, the defeat, mourning for the loss, the will to rebuild, and the present moment of national reaffirmation. The composer guides the listener by incorporating fragments of folk songs, the National Anthem of Catalonia, and a funeral march structure in the most dramatic movements. Brotons drew inspiration from the popular enthusiasm of the massive 11 September 2012 demonstration, a key moment in the wave of pro-independence reaffirmation leading up to 2014, the year of the Tricentennial commemoration. He stated, "This is the piece I have written with the most emotion, cherishing every note I composed." Later, he added choral parts to transform it into a large-scale cantata.

On 13 December of the same year, the musical Fang i setge premiered at the Teatre de la Passió in Olesa de Montserrat, with music by Brotons, text by Josep Pedrals i Urdàniz, and dramaturgy by Marc Rosich. Among the hundred actors in the cast, notable performances included those of Lloll Bertran, Neus Pàmies, Pep Molina, and Teresa Vallicrosa. The production was directed by Joan Font i Pujol of Comediants. The story revolves around Onia, a young woman from a wealthy family who decides to stay in Barcelona to defend the city.

The 2016-2017 season, Brotons was the composer-in-residence at the Palau de la Música Catalana. On 20 January 2017, he premiered a cantata about the life of Ramon Llull titled Cantata de Randa (named after the mountain where Llull retreated), with a libretto by painter Neus Dalmau. The performance featured the Orquestra Simfònica Illes Balears, the Orfeó Català, soprano Marta Mathéu, and baritone Josep Ramon Olivé as soloists, with actress Sílvia Bel as the narrator.

In March 2018, for the 25th anniversary of the Orquestra Nacional Clàssica d'Andorra, in collaboration with GIO Symphonia of Girona, Brotons premiered the Double Concerto for Violin, Cello, and Orchestra, op. 144, featuring Andorran soloists Lluís and Gerard Claret. In February 2022, his Missa per la pau (Mass for Peace), a work for soprano, mixed choir, and orchestra, was premiered.

Since the 2022-2023 season, Brotons has replaced Josep Ferré as principal conductor of the Simfònica de Sant Cugat, a position he combines with a busy schedule as a conductor and composer. In 2024, he was awarded the Felip Pedrell Prize by the Associació Musical de Mestres Directors in recognition of his career and his work in promoting Catalan music and culture.

In May 2024, he premiered his Te Deum, op. 163, for baritone (Carlos Daza), mixed choir, and orchestra at the Auditori de Barcelona, conducting the Orquestra Simfònica de Barcelona.

== Style and awards ==
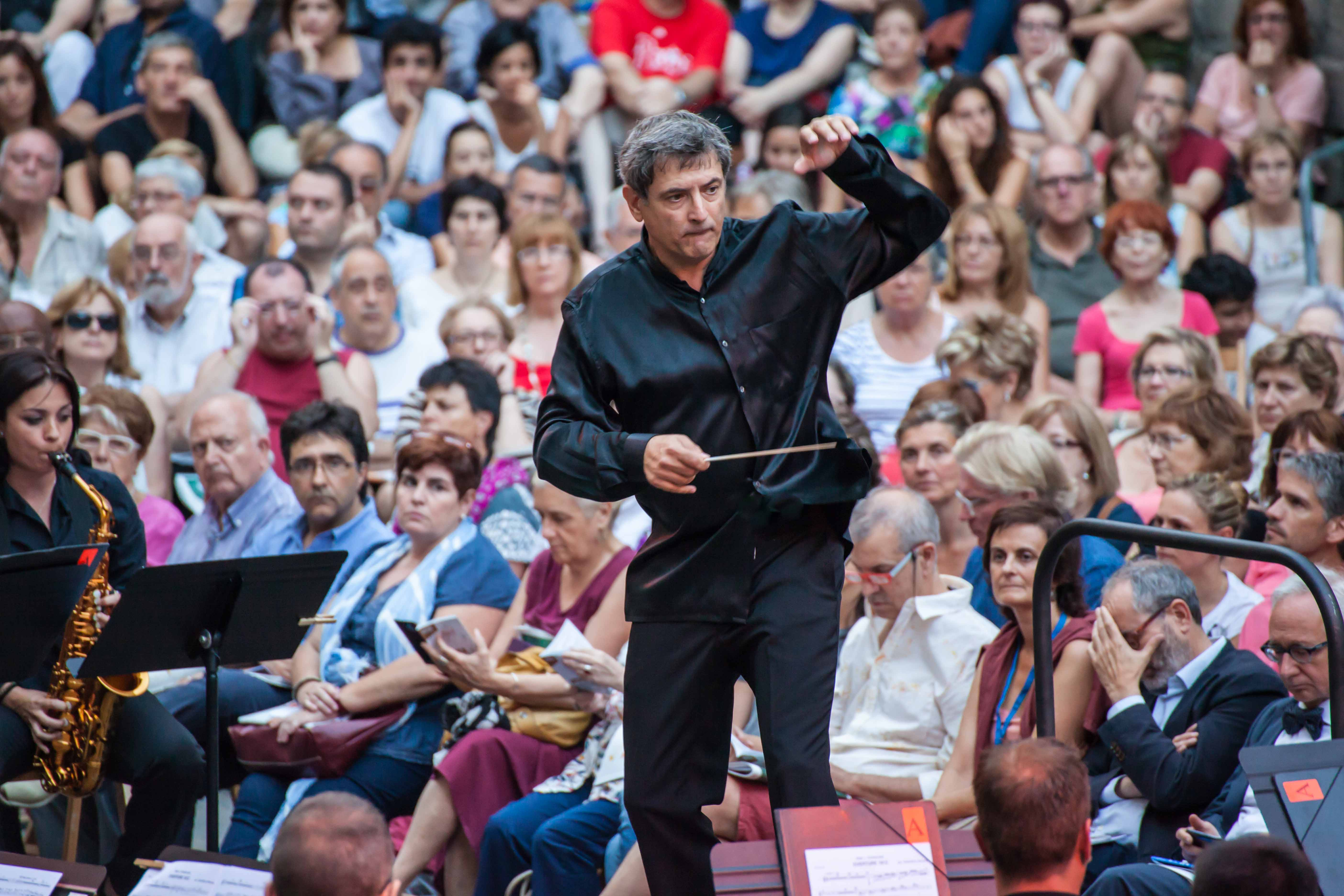
Concert at Plaça del Rei, July 2014, featuring excerpts from the work Catalunya 1714

Brotons' music distances itself from both French influence and Germanism, and consequently, from the avant-garde serialist movement. Instead, it decisively aligns with the musical worlds of Europe's peripheries, such as Russia (with Prokofiev and Shostakovich), Hungary (with Bartók), and even the "provincial" France of Poulenc. This foundation is further enriched by the influence of the American symphonic sound, characterized by its spectacularity, vibrancy in orchestral color, and a continuous pursuit of broad, descriptive, and striking sonorities. The use of bright timbres and a rich palette of instrumental colors clearly reflects the legacy of the American symphonic tradition, particularly that of Gershwin and Copland.

So far, throughout his life, Brotons has composed 143 works and 16 recordings. Brotons mainly produces works for orchestras and chamber ensembles. In the year 1977, he received his first award of the Premio Orquesta Nacional de España, for his Cuatro Piezas para Cuerdas. He later received the Premio Ciutat de Barcelona for his very first symphony in 1983, and for Absències in 1986. Also in the year of 1986, he received the Southeastern Composers League Award for his Sinfonietta de Camara. Shortly after, Brotons received the Madison University Flute Choir Composition Award for his piece Flute Suit in 1987, and the Premio Reina Sofia de Composición in 1991 for his Virtus of Orchestra. Recordings of Salvador Brotons' works have been released by labels like Naxos, EMI, Albany Records, RNE, and Harmonia Mundi. Much of his music has been published under the music company he founded in 2001, Brotons & Mercadal. He has also conducted in Israel, France, Germany, China, Poland, Uruguay, South Korea, Mexico, and Columbia.

== Personal life ==
Since 2001, Brotons has been teaching and conducting at the Escola Superior de Música de Catalunya. He is married to Melissa Mercadal, a flutist, psychologist, and music therapist. They are the parents of Clara Brotons, who works in various film productions in New York.

== Works ==
=== Orchestra ===
- Four Pieces for Strings (1977)
- Symphony No. 1 (1981)
- Symphony No. 2 (1984)
- Ataràxia (1984)
- Sinfonietta da camera (1985)
- Absències, for narrator and orchestra (1986)
- Interrogants (1987)
- Phaedon (1991)
- Virtus (1991)
- Divertimento alla Mozart (1991)
- Obstinació (1991)
- Catalan Rhapsody No. 1 Terres llemosines (1992)
- Symphony No. 3 (1992)
- Liliana, for narrator and orchestra (1993)
- Suite of the Chinese Zodiac (1994)
- Conmemorativa (1995)
- Concerto for Trombone and Orchestra (1995)
- Concerto for Flute and Orchestra (1996)
- Concerto for Violin and Orchestra (1996)
- Prelude, Interlude & Finale from 'Reverend Everyman' (1997)
- Poemes de Rem i Vela (1998)
- Catalan Christmas Carols (1998)
- Balearic Folk Collection (1999)
- Catalan Rhapsody No. 2 L’illa de la galera (2002)
- Catalan Rhapsody No. 4 Obertura Costa Brava (2005)
- Intrèpida. Symphonic Movement No. 9 (2007)
- Glosa de l’Emigrant (2009)
- Symphony No. 5 Mundus Noster (2010)
- Symphony No. 6 Concisa (2011)
- Ceremonial (2012)
- Catalan Rhapsody No. 5 Catalunya 1714 (2014)
- Catalan Rhapsody No. 3 El Llobregat (2017)
- Symphony No. 7 Ausiàs March (2018)
- Catalan Rhapsody No. 6 600 Years Ago (2020)

=== Choir and orchestra ===
- Cant per un vell poble (1983) – Cantata for two choirs and wind ensemble
- Stabat Mater (1997)
- Catalan Christmas Carols (1998)
- Balearic Folk Collection (1999)
- Ode to Verdaguer (2001) – Cantata for mixed choir, children's choir, and baritone
- History of a Millennium (2002) – Cantata for mixed choir, narrator, and orchestra
- Catalunya 1714 (2013) – For choir and orchestra
- Cantata de Randa (2015) – For mixed choir, orchestra, two narrators, soprano, and baritone
- Mass for Peace (2021) – For soprano, mixed choir, and orchestra
- Te Deum (2022) – For baritone, mixed choir, and orchestra

=== Stage works ===
- Reverend Everyman (1989)
- Before the Silence (1998)
- The Dream Merchant (2002)
- Fang i setge (2014)

=== Concertos ===
- Fantasy for Horn and Strings (1979)
- Concerto for Trombone and Orchestra (1995)
- Concerto for Flute and Orchestra (1996)
- Concerto for Violin and Orchestra (1996)
- Concerto Mare Nostrum for Guitar and Orchestra (1999)
- Troubadour Concerto for Cello and Orchestra (2003)
- Concertino for Trombone (2004)
- Percussed Perceptions (2005), Double Concerto for 2 percussionist and string orchestra
- Catalan Concerto for Tenora and Orchestra (2006)
- Concerto for Viola and Strings (2006), orchestrated later for full orchestra
- Concerto for Double Bass and Band (2008)
- Concerto Ab Origine for Horn and Orchestra (2009)
- Concerto for Oboe and Orchestra (2010)
- Concerto for Piccolo and Orchestra Dialogues with Axel (2012)
- Concerto for Bassoon and Orchestra (2013)
- Concerto for Brass Quintet and Orchestra (2014)
- Double Concerto for Flute, Violin (or Oboe), and String Orchestra (2016)
- Double Concerto for Violin and Cello The Andorran
- Concertino for Clarinet Quartet (2018)
- Concerto for Bass Clarinet and Orchestra (2018)
- Concerto for Tuba and Orchestra (2020)
- Concerto for Trumpet and Orchestra (2020)
- Double Concerto for Flute, Violin (or Oboe), and String Orchestra (2020)
- Double Concerto for Trumpet, Trombone, and Orchestra (2022)

=== Band ===
- Rebroll (1983)
- Sonata da Concerto for Trumpet and Band (1990)
- Catalan Christmas Carols (1997)
- Balearic Folk Collection (1998)
- Concerto for Flute (2000)
- Concerto for Trombone (2000)
- Troubadour Concerto for Cello and Wind Ensemble (2003)
- Concerto for Double Bass and Wind Orchestra (2008)
- Tribute to Puig Antich (2009)
- Tribute to Xirinacs (2009)
- Piccolo Concerto "Dialogues with Axel" (2012)
- Glosa de l’Emigrant (2013)
- Obstinacy (2013)
- Catalunya 1714 (2014)
- Romance and Tango (2016)
- Carpe Diem (2019)
- Winter Soufflé (2020)
- Covid-19 Sensations (2020)
- The upper sea (2021)
- Hungarian Festival (2023)
- Sweet Childhood (2023)

=== Voice, Choir ===
==== Mixed Choir a cappella ====
- Nocturne for an Island (1982)
- This Murmur You Hear (1983)
- Your Little Eyes (1983)
- An Oregon Love Poem (1993)
- Journey to the Myth (1992)
- By the Seashore (2002)
- Two Horacian Odes (2019)

==== Mixed Choir and Piano-Organ ====
- Les Quatre Estacions (The Four Seasons) (1993)
- The Grove (also La arboleda) (1994)
- Sardana Universal (The Universal Sardana) (2003)
- Missa Brevis (2007)
- Three Songs from the Musical Fang i Setge (2015)
- Oda Infinita (2016)

==== Vocal and Instrumental Ensembles ====
- Song for an Old Village (1983)
- Jam rara micant (1985)
- The Journey of Kira and Jan (2003)
- Return to Delphos (2005)

==== Voice and Piano ====
- Four Songs on Poems by Martí i Pol (1981)
- Autumn Salon (1999)
- Songs from La Roda del Temps (2013)
- The Beautiful Paths (2019)
- Two Sonnets by J.V. Foix (1992)
- Chromos of Natural History (2007)
- Eight Songs from Fang i Setge (2015)
- Four Arias from Reverend Everyman (2020)
- Two Marine Poems (2023)

=== Chamber Music ===
==== For Two Instruments ====
- Capriccio Brillante (1975/2013), for Flute & Piano
- Diaulos (1976-2010), for two Flutes
- Fantasia (1976), for Horn & Piano
- Autumn Leaves (1978), for Trumpet & Piano
- Sonata for Flute and Piano (1979)
- Divertimento (1978), for Trumpet & Piano
- Sonata for Cello and Piano (1978)
- Sonata for Viola and Piano (1982)
- Sonata for Clarinet and Piano (1988)
- Subtile Dialogues (1990), for Bassoon & Percussion
- Fantasia Concertante (1990), for Flute and Marimba/Vibraphone
- Sonata da Concerto (1990), for Trumpet & Piano
- Sonata for Violin and Piano (1994)
- Tre Divertimenti (1994), for Flute & Guitar
- A Mallet Duet (1994), for Marimba & Vibraphone
- Sonata No. 2 for Flute and Piano (1996)
- Sonata for Alto Saxophone and Piano (2004)
- Contrasting Fantasia (2006), for Clarinet and Marimba/Vibraphone
- Sonata for Oboe and piano (2010), for Violin & Piano
- Sonata for Bassoon and Piano (2013)
- Romance and Waltz (2011)
- Coloured Skies (2015), for Flute & Harp
- Introduction and Galop (2018), for Horn & Piano
- Vital Impulse (2019), for Trumpet & Piano
- Sonata Fantasia (2021), for Cello & Piano
- String Duo (2022), for Violin & Cello

==== For Three Instruments ====
- Ad Infinitum (1976), for Flute, Viola & Harp
- Suite à Trois (1977), for Flute, Oboe & Clarinet
- Miniatures (1977), for two Flutes & Alto Flute
- Mirrors (1979), for Violin, Clarinet & Piano
- Piano Trio Op. 39 (1986), for Violin, Cello & Piano
- Brass Trio (2004), for Trumpet, Horn & Trombone
- Requiem Trio (2004), for Violin, Cello & Piano
- Lament and Divertimento (2009), for three Cellos or our Cellos
- Tree of Flames (2017), for high voice, Flute & Guitar
- Souvenir à Carl et Frank Doppler (2023), for two Flutes & Piano

==== For Four Instruments ====
- String Quartet No. 1 (1978)
- Regret (1980), for Saxophone Quartet
- 5 Little Pieces (1981), for Clarinet Quartet
- Piano Quartet in E A Celebration of Life (1987)
- String Quartet No. 2 Springlike (2016)
- Quartet for Flute (2019), for Flute, Violin, Viola & Cello
- Dalinian Strokes (2020), for Violin, Viola, Cello & Piano
- Resilience (2023), for Saxophone Quartet
- String Quartet No. 3 Elegiaco (2024)

==== For Five Instruments ====
- Emphasis (1975), for Woodwind Quintet
- Struggle, Lament, and Triumph (1979), for Brass Quintet
- Wind Quintet with Saxophone (1977), for Flute, Oboe, Alto Saxophone, Horn & Bassoon
- Theme, Variations, and Coda (1982), for Woodwind Quintet
- Virtus (1990), for Flute, Violin, Viola, Cello & Piano
- Essentiae Vitae (2000), for Woodwind Quintet
- Reed Quintet (2010), for Oboe, Clarinet, Alto Saxophone, Bass clarinet & Bassoon

==== For More Than Five Instruments ====
- Presage (1984), for String Quartet, Flute, Oboe, and Percussion
- Sinfonietta da Camera (1985), for 2 Flutes, 2 Oboes, 2 Clarinets, 2 Bassoons, 2 Horns, 1 Trumpet, 1 Trombone, Tuba, and Percussion
- Flute Suite (1986), for 10 Flutes (2 Piccolo, 6 Flutes, Alto Flute and Bass Flute)
- Fusion (1987), for Flute, Oboe, Clarinet, Bassoon, Horn, Trumpet, Trombone, Percussion & String Quintet
- Mixt Sextet (1992), for Flute, Clarinet, Violin, Cello, Piano & Percussion
- Prada 1950 Op. 81 (2000), for Flute, Clarinet, 2 Violins, Viola, Cello and Double bass
- Epic Sounds (2010), for 8 Horns (also a later version for 8 Trombones)
- Concerto for Brass Quintet (2014), for 2 Trumpets, Horn, Trombone, Tuba & Piano
- Settimino a7 (2016), for Clarinet, Bassoon, Horn, Violin, Viola, Cello & Double bass
- Tuneful Music (2019), for 8 Flutes (1 Piccolo, 5 Flutes, Alto flute & Bass Flute)

=== Instrumental ===
==== For Guitar ====
- Two Suggestions (1979)
- Sonatina (1988)
- Soliloquy (1997)
- Prelude and Dance (1986)
- Scherzo (1988)
- Partita of the Temperaments (2000)
- Three Homage Preludes (2002)
- Two New Suggestions (2011)
- Sephardic Sonata (2017)

==== For Piano ====
- Elegy for the Death of Shostakovich (1975)
- Utopian Ideals (1976)
- Interlude for the Left Hand (1988)
- Crystals (1996)
- Three Nocturnes alla Chopin (2010)
- Three Short Pieces (1975)
- Impromptu (1985)
- Toccata (1993)
- Dedications (2009)
- Sonata for Piano (2011)
- Tres estudis contrastats (2024)

==== For Other Instruments ====
- Subtlety for Harp (1986)
- Sonatina Acquifera (2005), for Marimba
- Clear and clean (2011), for solo Clarinet
- Variations on a Baroque Theme (2017), for solo Violin
- Et in terra pax (2004), for solo Violin
- Sonata for Cello (2006)
- Giravolts (2011), for solo Flute
- Sonata Covid-19 (2020), for solo Viola
- Sonata for Harp (2020)

=== Sardanes ===
- El Port de la Selva (1975, revisió 2008)
- Synera (1978, revisió 2008)
- Les Encaixades (1983)
- Atlanta 96 (1994)
- Germanor (2000)
- Companyonia Universal (2002, revisió 2007)
- Noces d’Argent (2008)
- Ofrena (2008)
- Badalona 2010 (2010)
- Per a tu Catalunya (2014)
- Mar d’estiu (2022)
