= Royal Oude Harmonie of Eijsden =

Royal Oude Harmonie van Eijsden
- Also known as: KOH, De Blôw
- Origin: Netherlands, Eijsden
- Members: Chairman; Willy Martens; Secretary; Kevin van der Laak; Treasurer; Jo Goessens
- Website: koheijsden.nl

The Royal Oude Harmonie, often referred to by their abbreviation KOH or the Limburgish term De Blôw, is a music association with a concert band and percussion ensemble from Eijsden, which was founded in 1874.

In 1949 the Oude Harmonie was the first association in Eijsden to receive the designation "Royal" or "Koninklijk" in Dutch.

In 1963, the Royal Oude Harmonie, under the direction of the then conductor Matthijs Scheffer, was promoted to the highest level: the Superior Division of the Limburgse bond van harmoniegezelschappen (Limburgish Association of Harmony Societies) in the Federatie van Katholieke Muziekbonden in Nederland (Federation of Catholic Music Associations in the Netherlands). New highlights were the musical performances delivered in 1988/1989 under the direction of conductor Jean Steutelings.

In 1993, the Royal Oude Harmonie, conducted by Ben Essers, took part in the World Music Contest (WMC) in Kerkrade and delivered a huge performance. In 1997 this result was surpassed. In 2013, the KOH took part in the WMC again, where a top score of 95.75 was achieved in the First Division Wind Band. With this point total, the KOH is the reigning Dutch champion in his division and vice world champion.

== Concert band ==
Concert band of the Royal Oude Harmonie van Eijsden
- Origin: Netherlands, Eijsden
- Genres: Classical
- Occupation: Concert band
- Years active: 1874-present
- Members: Conductor; Jacques Claessens
- Website: koheijsden.nl/harmonie-orkest

=== Conductors ===
Years	Name	Title
1874 - 1883	Nicolaas Petrus van Polfliet	
1883 - 1890	Jean Defèsche	
1890 - 1893	J. Uutterwulghe	
1893 - 1931	Guustaaf Francies de Pauw	
1931 - 1937	Léon Verhaeghe	Honorary conductor
1937	Jean Thijssens	
1938 - 1939	Maurice Motte	
1939 - 1942	Jean Claessens	
1942 - 1945	World War II	
1945 - 1948	Maurice Motte	
1948 - 1949	Pierre Bovy	
1949 - 1957	Jean Wolfs	
1957 - 1958	Harrie Biessen	Honorary conductor
1959	Jos Diederen	
1959 - 1977	Matthijs Scheffer	Honorary conductor
1977 - 1989	Jean Steutelings	
1989 - 2006	Ben Essers	Honorary conductor
2006 - 2010	Steven Walker	
2010 - present	Jacques Claessens	

== Percussion ensemble ==
Percussion ensemble of the Royal Oude Harmonie van Eijsden
- Origin: Netherlands, Eijsden
- Genres: Classical
- Occupation: Percussion ensemble
- Years active: 1949-present
- Members: Conductor; Henrico Stevens
- Website: koheijsden.nl/slagwerkensemble

=== Musical leaders ===
Years	Name
1949 - ????	Dhr. Geurts
???? - 1960	Jacques Janssen
1960 - 1965	André Heye
1965 - 1976	Martin Warnier
1976 - 1977	Louis Wolfs
1977 - 1991	Martin Warnier
1991 - 1996	Hans Croes
1996 - 2010	Frank Marx
2010 - present	Henrico Stevens

== Trivia ==
In Eijsden the harmony is also known as "De Blôw", because of the blue color of the caps. This distinction is necessary in Eijsden, because there is another concert band in Eijsden, namely the Royal Harmonie Sainte Cécile Eijsden, which are called "De Roei", because of the red color of their caps.
