= National Music Prize (Catalonia) =

The National Music Prize (Premi Nacional de Música) is one of the National Arts Awards awarded annually by the Generalitat of Catalonia. The prize money is 18,000 euros.

== Previous winners ==
- 1992 - Vallès Symphony Orchestra
- 1993 - Victoria de los Ángeles
- 1994 - Manuel Oltra i Ferrer
- 1995 - Joan Guinjoan
- 1996 - Montserrat Torrent
- 1997 - Xavier Montsalvatge
- 1998 - Anna Ricci
- 1999 - Joaquim Homs
- 2000 - Josep Maria Mestres Quadreny
- 2001 - Josep Soler i Sardà
- 2002 - Joan Albert Amargós
- 2003 - Montserrat Caballé
- 2004 - Alicia de Larrocha
- 2005 - Toti Soler
- 2006 - Orfeó Català
- 2007 - Benet Casablancas
- 2008 - Antònia Font
- 2009 - Jordi Savall
- 2010 - Jordi Cervelló
- 2011 - Miguel Poveda
- 2012 - Pere Camps
