= Albert Guinovart =

Spanish-Catalan composer (born 1962)

Albert Guinovart (Catalan pronunciation: [əlˈβɛɾd ɣinuˈβaɾt]; born 1962 in Barcelona) is a Spanish composer and pianist.

Guinovart studied at the Municipal Conservatory of Barcelona (Conservatori Municipal de Música de Barcelona). Since 2002 he has taught composition at ESMUC (Escola Superior de Música de Catalunya).

== Works ==
Musicals: Mar i cel (1988, 2004) Flor de Nit (1992), Desconcerto Grosso (1994), Gaudí, el musical de Barcelona (2003) Paradís (2005).

- Guinovart. Piano Concerto No.1 Mar i Cel (Sea and Sky), from his musical of the same name. Piano Concerto No.2 Traces. Petrenko. Symphonic poem El Lament de la Terra (2008). Roberto Minczuck Toccata Classics
