= Miguel Farré Mallofré =

Spanish pianist and chess player (1936–2021)

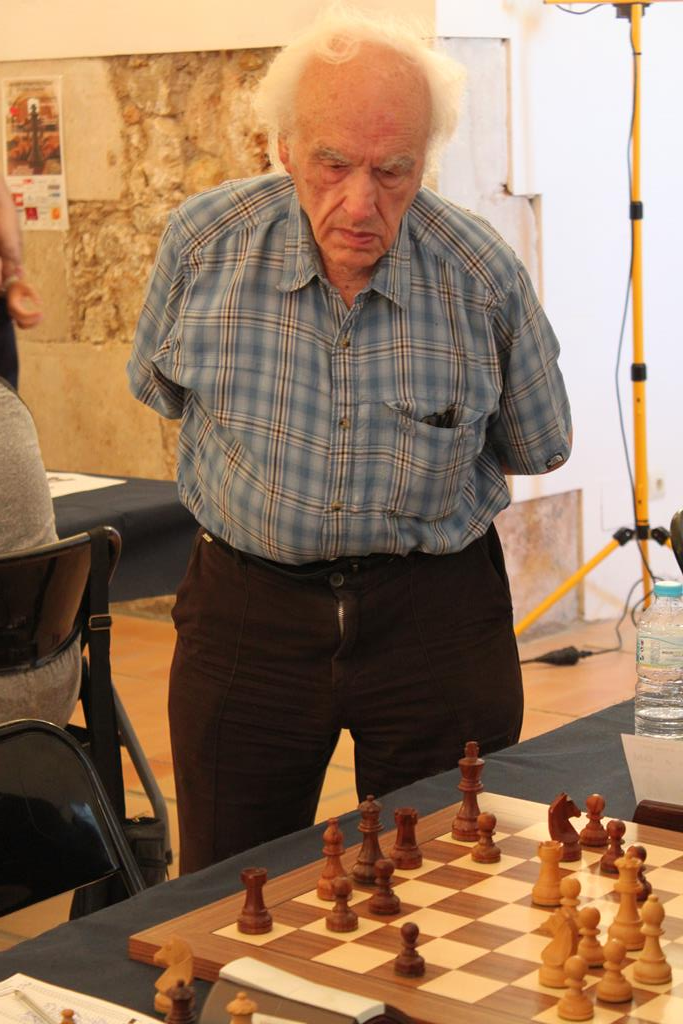
- Farré in Figueres, 2016

Personal information
- Born: February 23, 1936 Terrassa, Spain
- Died: May 29, 2021 (aged 85) Terrassa, Spain

Chess career
- Country: Spain
- Title: International Master (1959)

Miguel Farré Mallofré (23 February 1936 – 29 May 2021), Catalan spelling Miquel Farré i Mallofré, was a Spanish pianist and music professor from Terrassa, Catalonia. As a young man, he was one of Spain's leading chess players, gaining the title of International Master in 1959 and representing Spain at two Chess Olympiads.

== Chess career ==
Miguel Farré Mallofré participated in two World junior championships in 1953 and 1955. In 1953 he finished second in the "B" final (10th overall); in 1955 he finished third behind Boris Spassky and Edmar Mednis.

He finished second in the Catalan championship in 1955 and 1957, and was second in the 1957 Spanish championship behind Arturo Pomar.

Farré represented Spain at two Chess Olympiads. In 1958, on board 4, he scored 10/15; in 1960 he scored 8½/15. He was awarded the International Master title in 1959.

His last major tournament was in Torremolinos in 1961, where he finished in a tie for fourth place behind Svetozar Gligoric and Arturo Pomar. After this, he gave up high level chess to concentrate on his musical career. He remained an active member of his club CE Terrassa, representing them in the Spanish Team Championship until 1981.

== Music career ==
In 1954, Farré won the inaugural Maria Canals International Music Competition. In 1968, he became the chair of the piano department at the Municipal Conservatory of Barcelona, a position he occupied until his death.
