= Joan Lamote de Grignon =

Catalan Spanish musician (1872-1949)

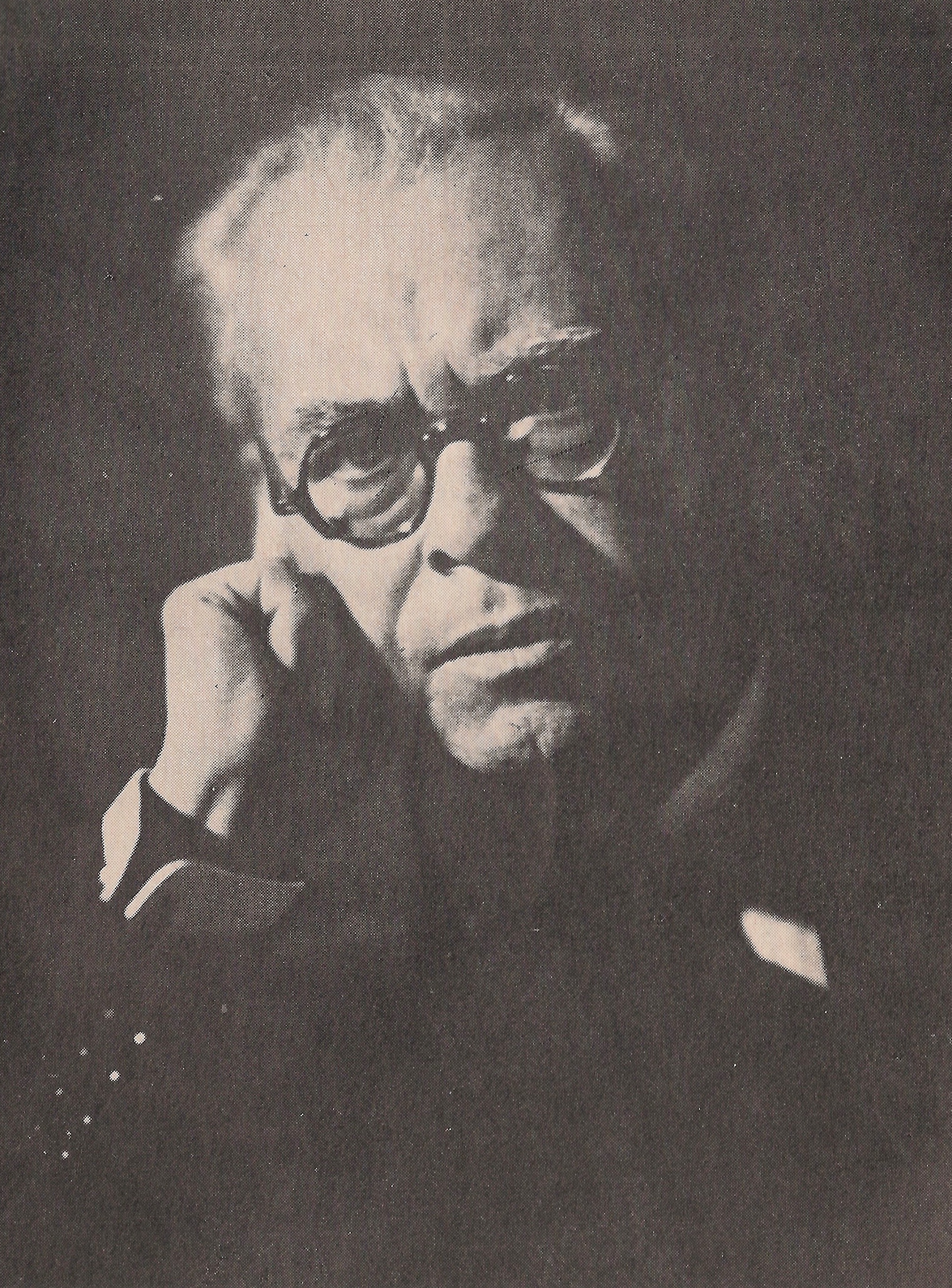
- Born: 7 July 1872; Barcelona, Catalonia, Spain
- Died: 11 March 1949 (aged 76); Barcelona
- Resting place: Sant Gervasi Cemetery, Barcelona
- Occupations: pianist, composer and orchestra director
- Known for: Sardanes for Cobla: El Testament de n'Amèlia, Solidaritat de Flors, La Rosa del folló and Florida.
- Children: Ricard Lamote de Grignon

Signature
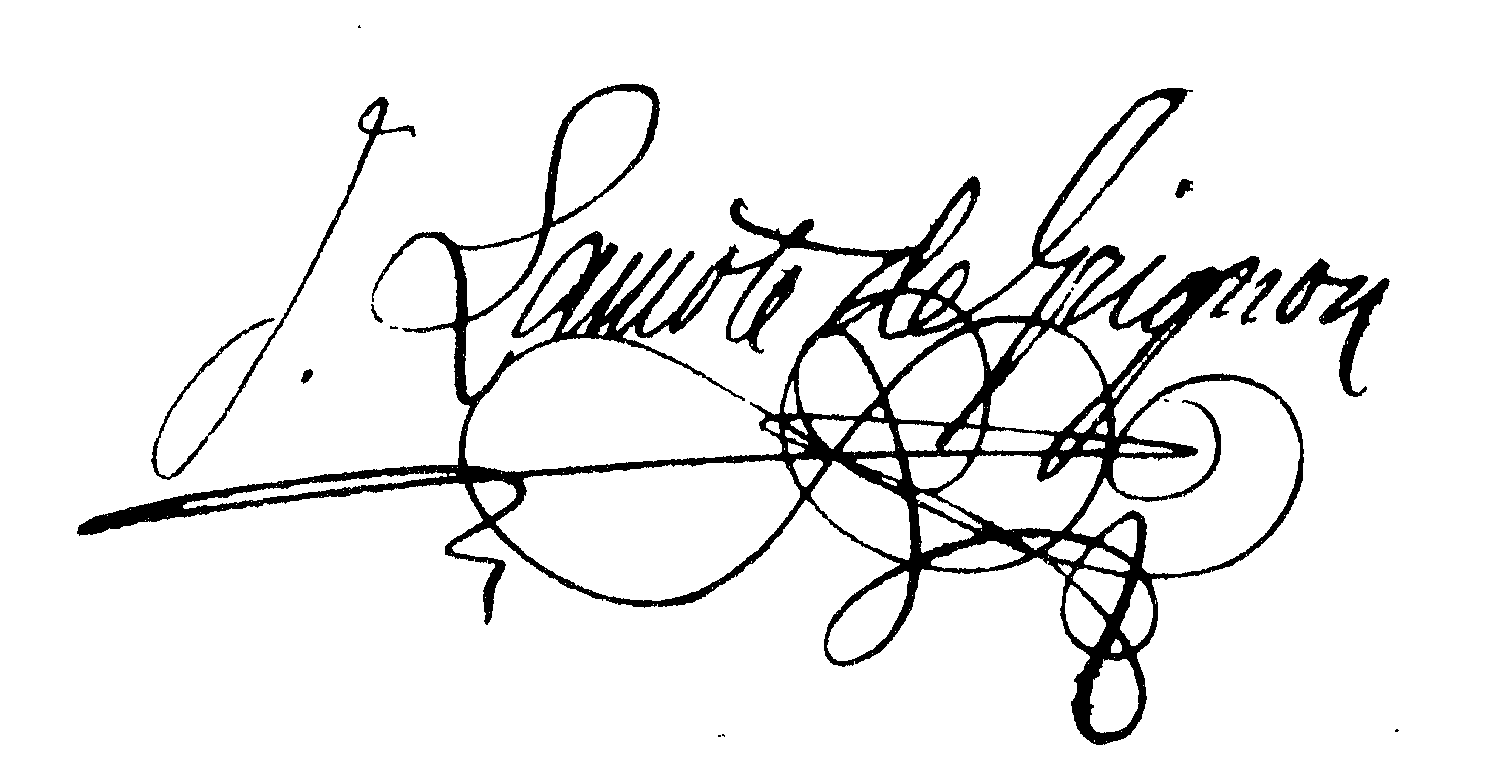

Joan Lamote de Grignon i Bocquet (Catalan pronunciation: [ʒuˈan ləˈmɔd də ɣɾiˈɲɔn]; 7 July 1872 – 11 March 1949) was a Catalan Spanish pianist, composer and orchestra director.

== Life ==
Joan Lamote de Grignon was born and died in Barcelona, the son of parents of French descent, Lluis Lamote de Grignon and Elena Bocquet. He studied with Felip Pedrell in Barcelona. In 1911 he founded the Barcelona Symphony Orchestra, of which he was also music director. He directed the Berlin Philharmonic Orchestra. He was the successor of Celestí Sadurní in directing the Municipal Band of Barcelona in 1914, from where he promoted young performers and provided the Band with an acknowledged repertoire. Three years later he was appointed director of the Conservatory of the Gran Teatre del Liceu of Barcelona. In 1943 he founded the Valencia Municipal Orchestra, which he directed until 1949.

His compositions, including transcriptions and arrangements, comprise some 150 songs, the oratorio La nit de Nadal(1906), the lyric drama Hespèria(1907), a symphonic trilogy, a symphony, a Missa eucarística for two voices and organ, motets and spiritual songs, and El parc d'atraccions for piano. He also wrote various sardanes for cobla and helped to found the band Cobla Barcelona.

His son Ricard Lamote de Grignon followed in his father's footsteps as a composer and orchestra director. Ricard worked alongside him as assistant director of the newly created València Municipal Orchestra.

The archive of the Lamote de Grignon family, with works by Joan and his son Ricard, is at the document repository of the Generalitat of Catalunya and may be studied in the Biblioteca de Catalunya.

He died 1949 and was buried in the Sant Gervasi Cemetery, Barcelona.

== Music ==
Lamote's compositions include about 150 songs, the oratorio La nit de Nadal (Christmas Night) (1906), the lyric drama Hespèria (1907), a symphonic trilogy, one symphony, a Mass for two voices and organ, motets and spiritual songs. There are also works for orchestra with voice, lieder and songs, scenic music, voice and piano, sardanes for cobla, and transcriptions for band.

- Sardanes for cobla: Solidaritat de flors (1907), La Rosa del folló (1908) and El Testament de n'Amèlia (1909). His fourth and last sardana, Florida (1916), was for cobla and men's voices, written for a choir at the Orfeó Gracienc in Barcelona.

== Recordings ==
- Songs of Joan and Ricard Lamote de Grignon

== Bibliography ==
- Francesc Bonastre i Bertran: Joan Lamote de Grignon (Barcelona: Proa, 1998); ISBN 84-8256-708-X
