= Carme Vilà =

Catalan pianist (born 1937)

Carme Vilà i Fassier (born 21 March 1937) is a Catalan pianist. From 1997 to 2001 she was the director of the Municipal Conservatory of Barcelona.

== Biography ==
Vilà was born in Roses, Girona, and is the fourth generation of pianists in her family and her sister, Isabel Vilà Fassier is a violinist. Carmen Vilà started studying piano at the age of four with Emilia Palau. She entered the Conservatori Superior del Liceu in Barcelona at the age of 12, and graduated with the highest grades and with the Silver and gold medals at the age of 16. She later studied with Béla Síki in Switzerland, at the age of 17, and she was one of the finalists in the Geneva International Piano Competition in 1953 and 1955. In 1959 she entered the Musik Hochschule in Vienna at the Konzertfachklasse of the professor Richard Hauser and won the Haydn-Schubert International Competition in Vienna.

In 1961 Vilà obtained the Reifeprühfung from the Musik Akademie in Vienna with the highest qualification. She also studied with Alfred Brendel, Paul Badura-Skoda and Jörg Demus and received an extraordinary prize in the International course that these three great pianists gave in Vienna in 1962, granted and awarded by the Chigiana Academy of Siena where she took the courses with Alfred Cortot and Guido Agosti. In 1966 she obtained the Harriet Cohen Medal in London.

From 1967 to 1972 she worked as an assistant to Paul Badura-Skoda and as a resident artist at the University of Wisconsin–Parkside in the United States, where she is a doctor honoris causa. During this period she gave numerous concerts in South America with Ruggiero Ricci until she returned to Spain In 1977, where she received the Chair of the Municipal Conservatory of Barcelona and was its director from 1997 to 2001. She plays herself in the documentary film "Nocturno" by director Isabel Rivero Vilà.
