= Antoni de Falguera =

Catalan architect

Antoni de Falguera i Sivilla (1876 in Barcelona – 1947) was a Catalan architect. He was a student of Josep Puig i Cadafalch.

== Gallery ==
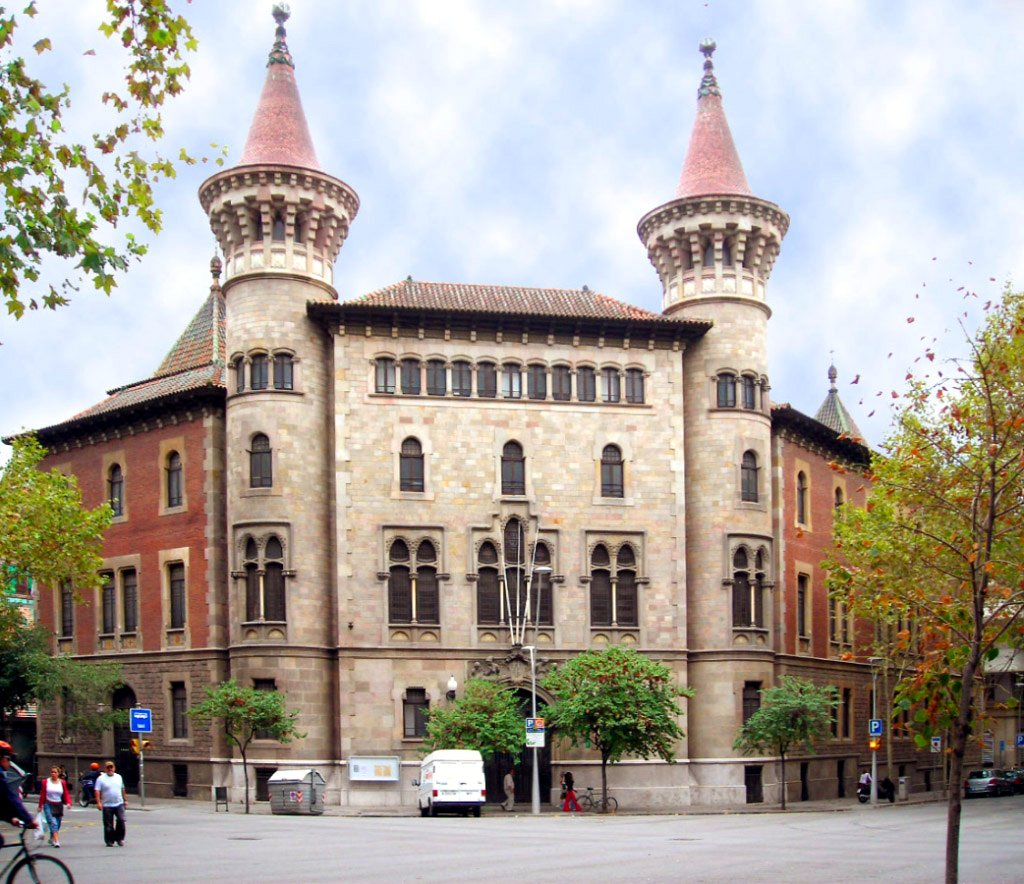
Municipal Conservatory of Barcelona

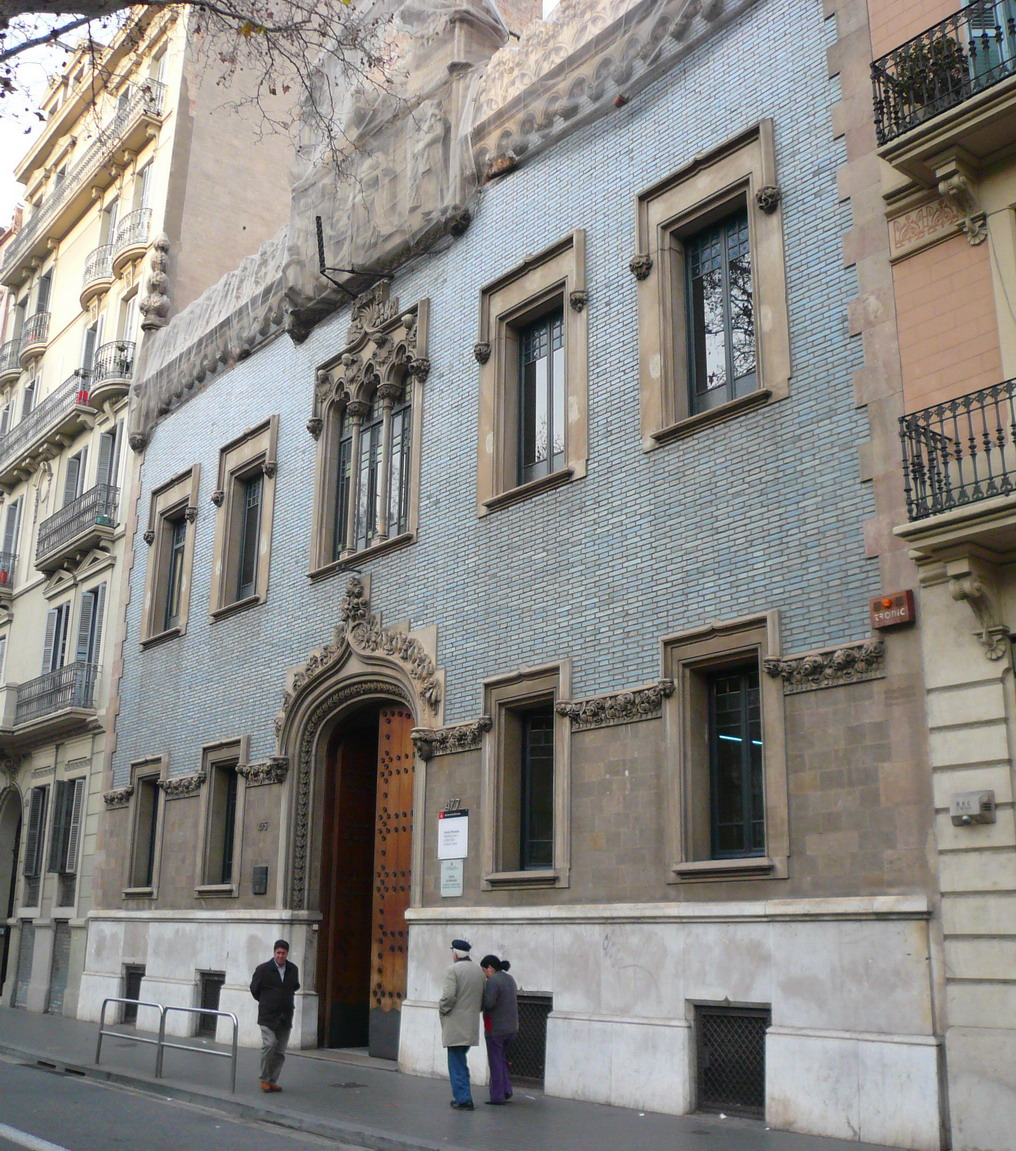
ca:Casa de la Lactància

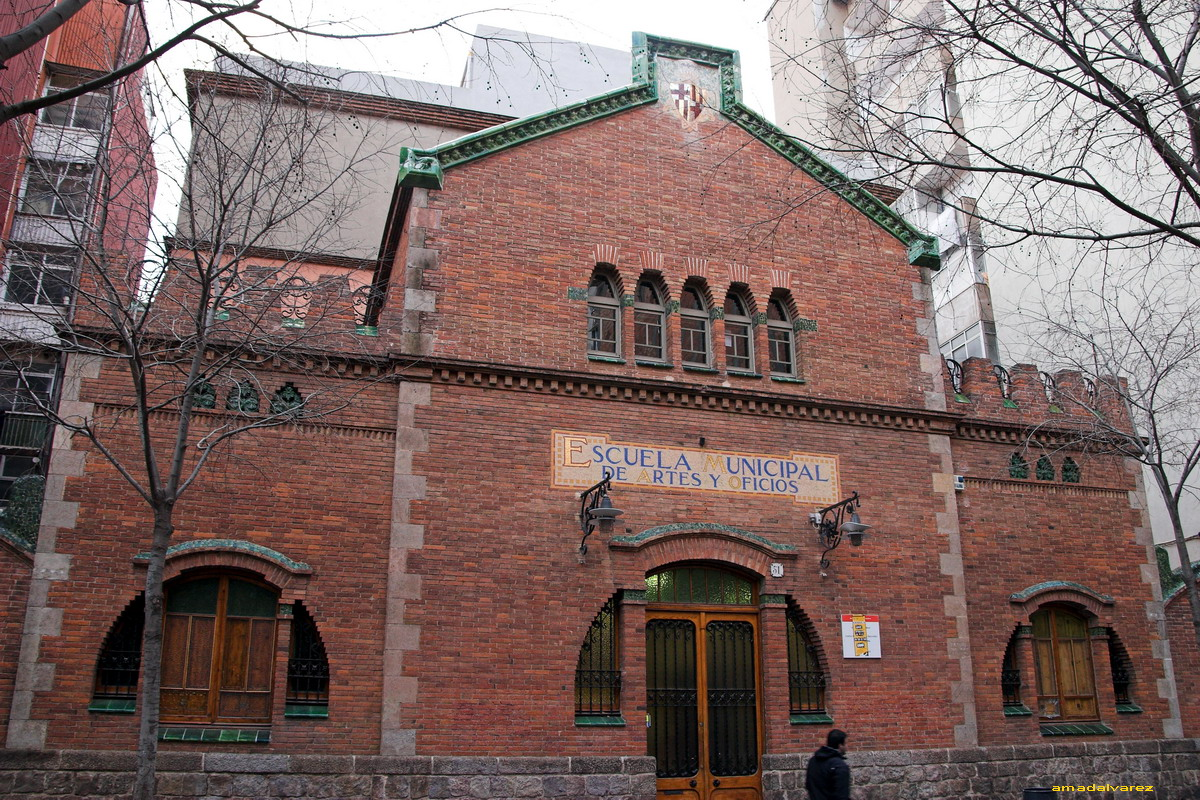
ca:Institut Municipal Juan Manuel Zafra

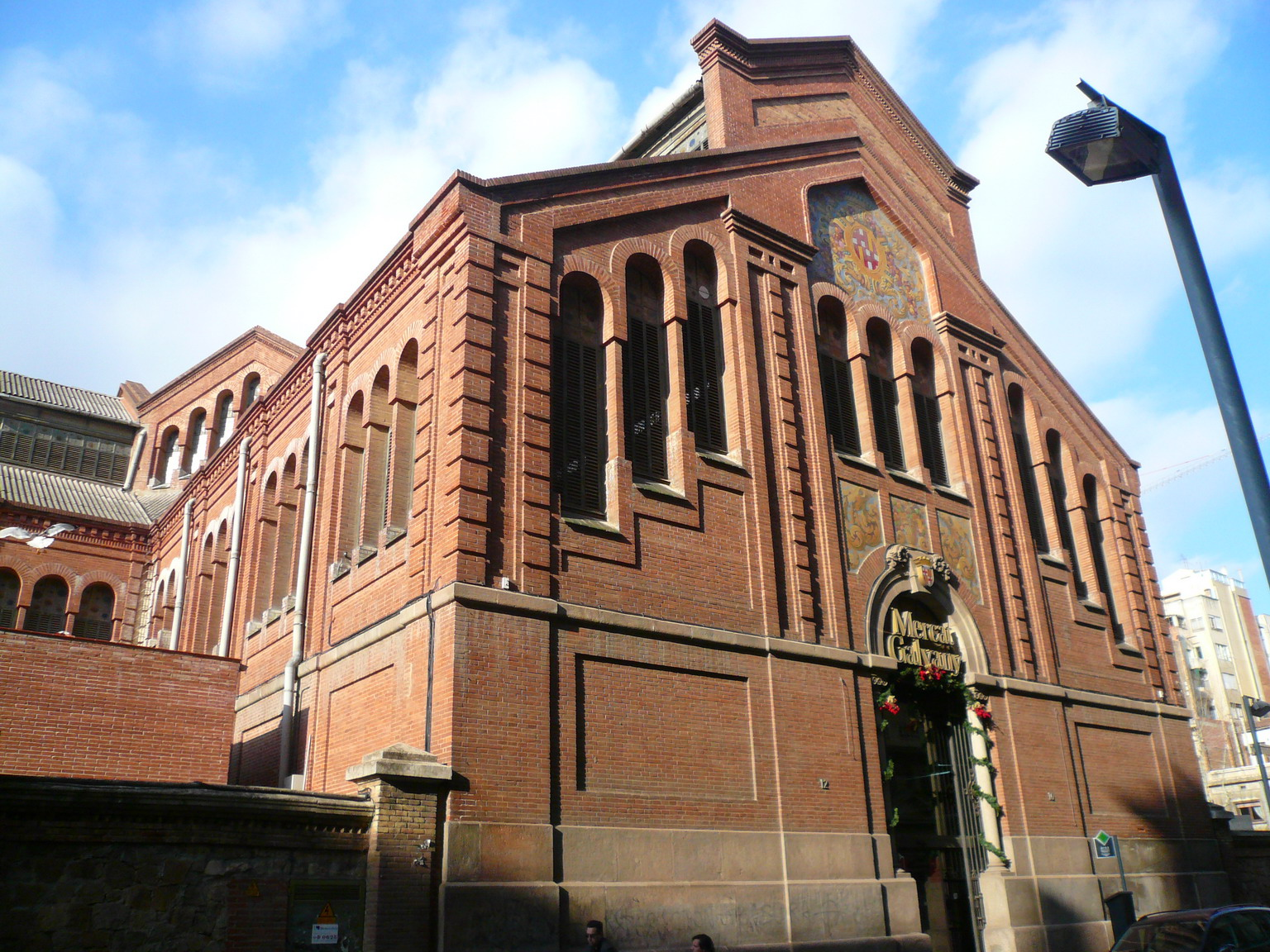
Mercat de Galvany

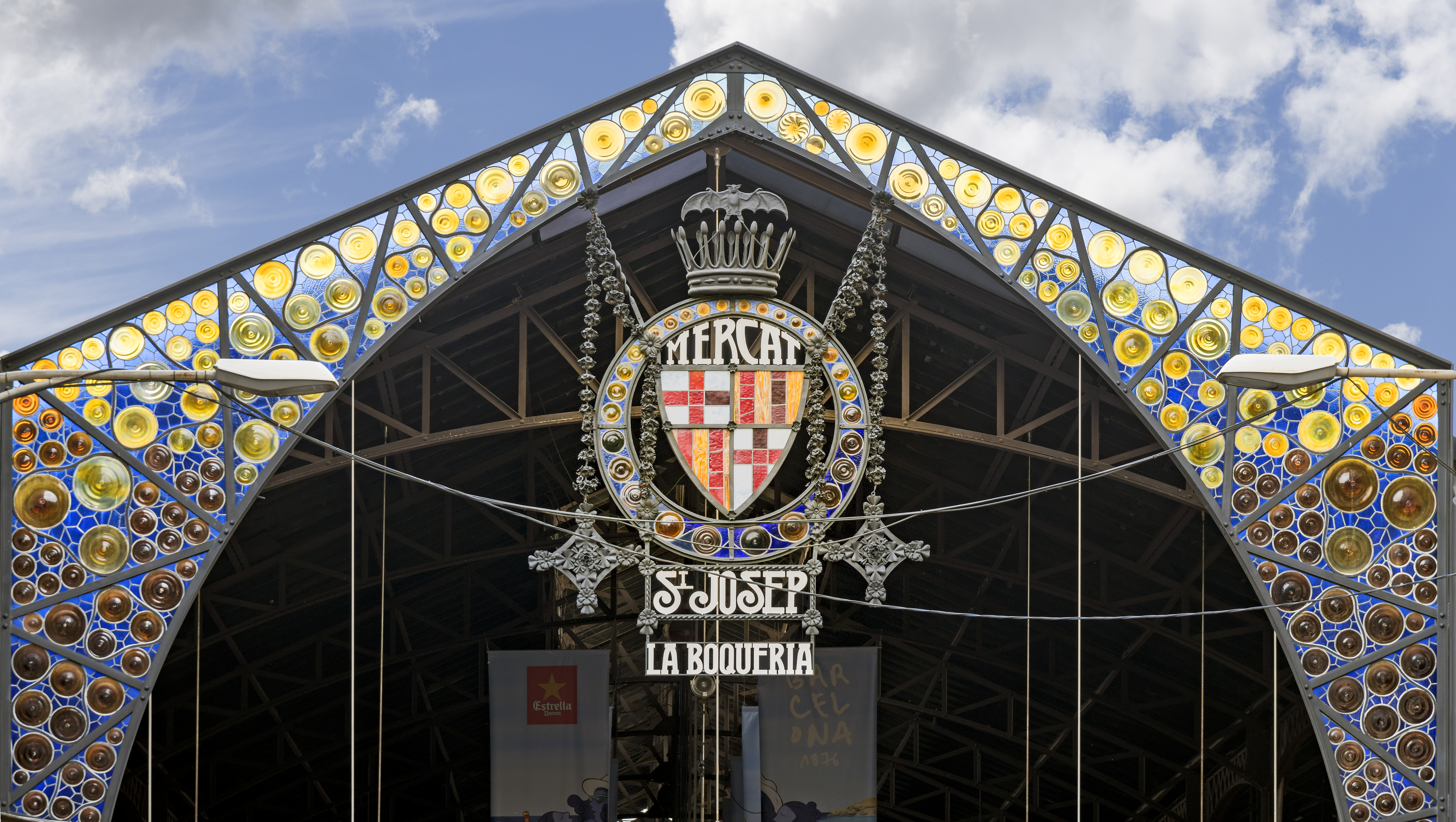
Mercat de Sant Josep La Boqueria

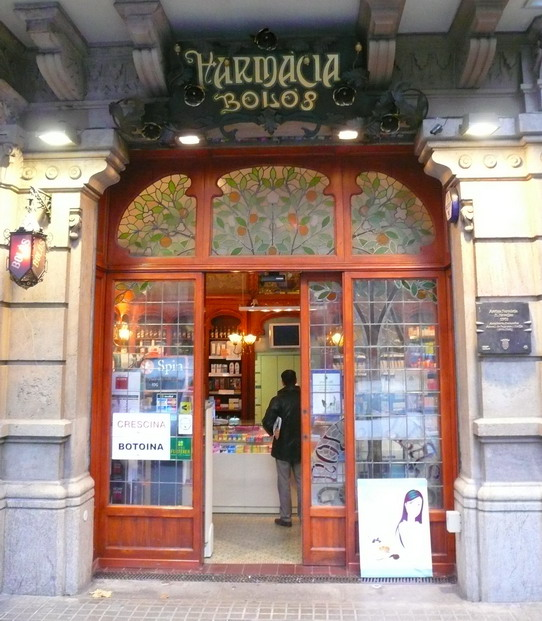
ca:Farmàcia Novellas

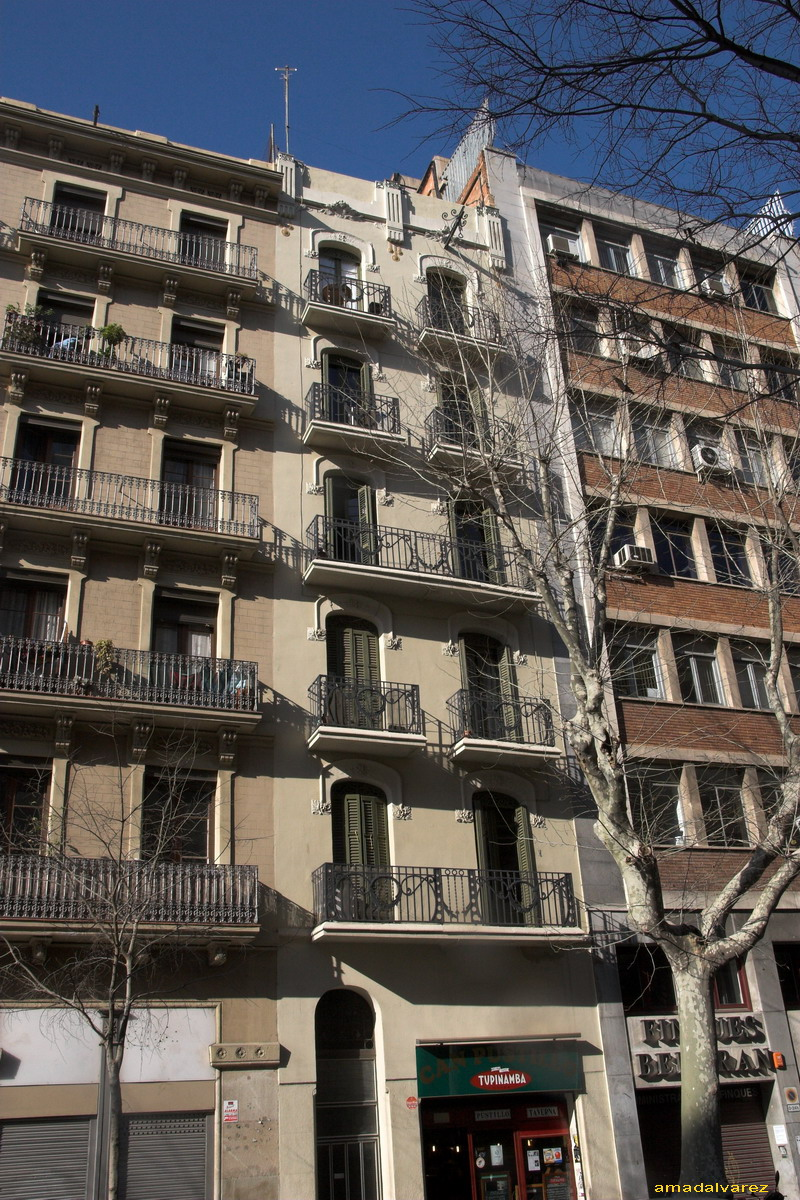
townhouse, Consell de Cent 81

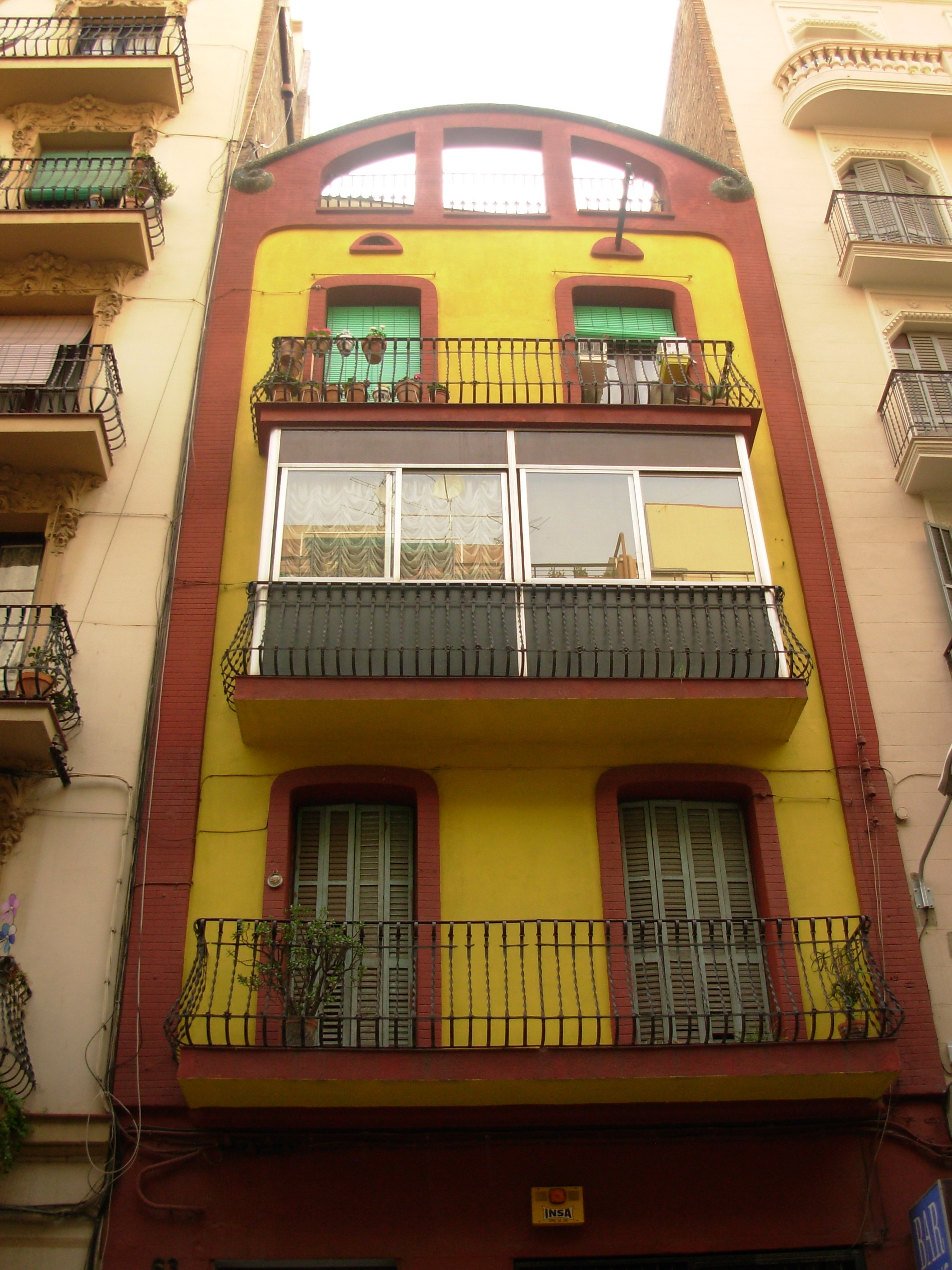
townhouse, Elkano 63

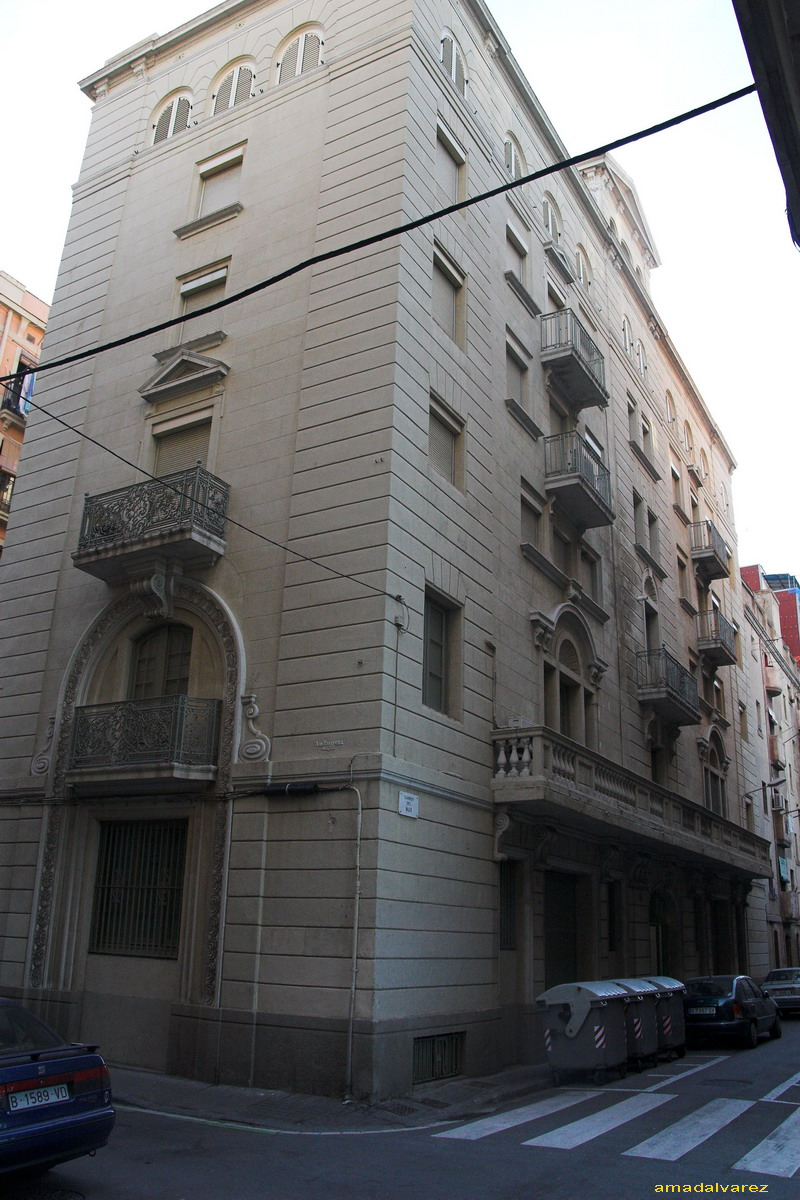
townhouse, Mar 95

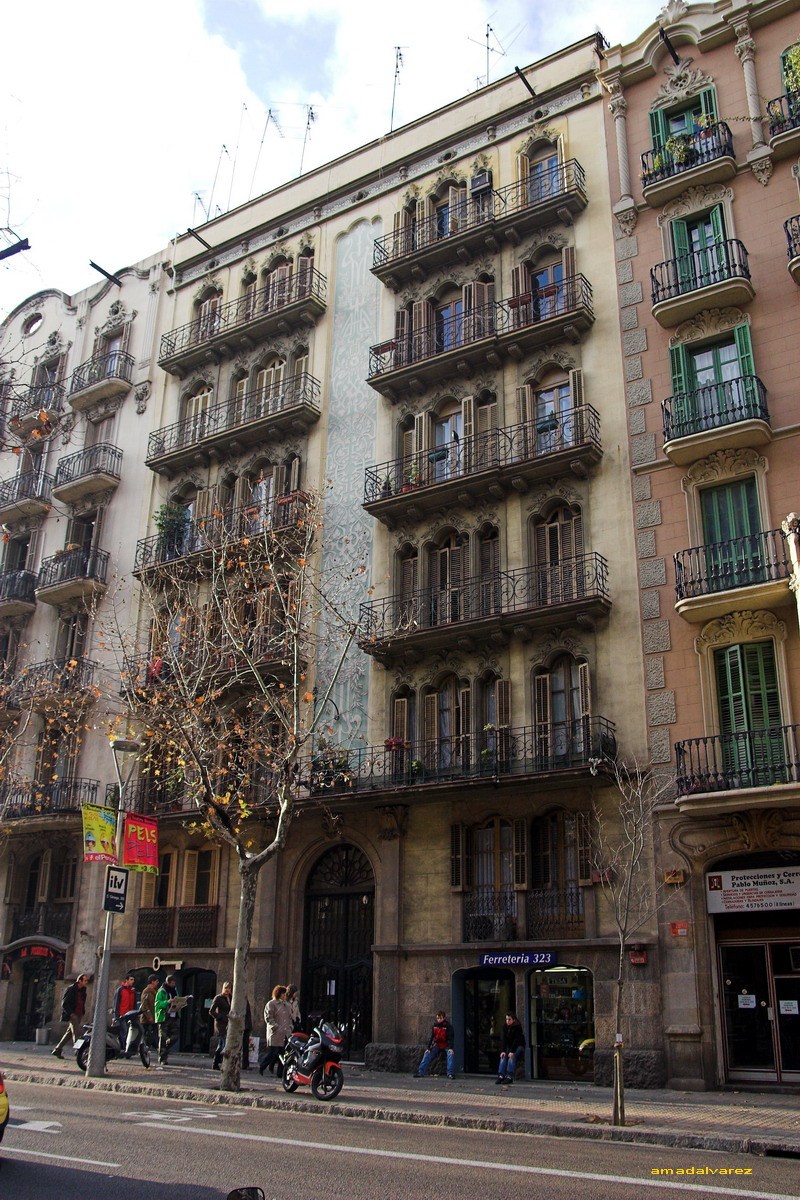
townhouse, Mallorca 323

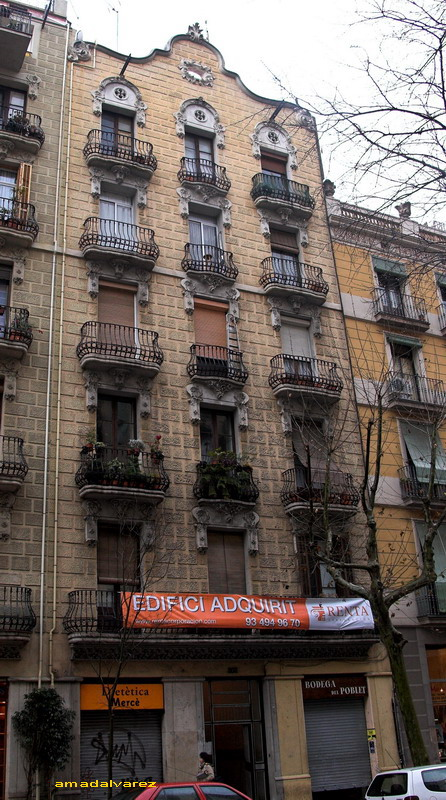
townhouse, Sardenya 302

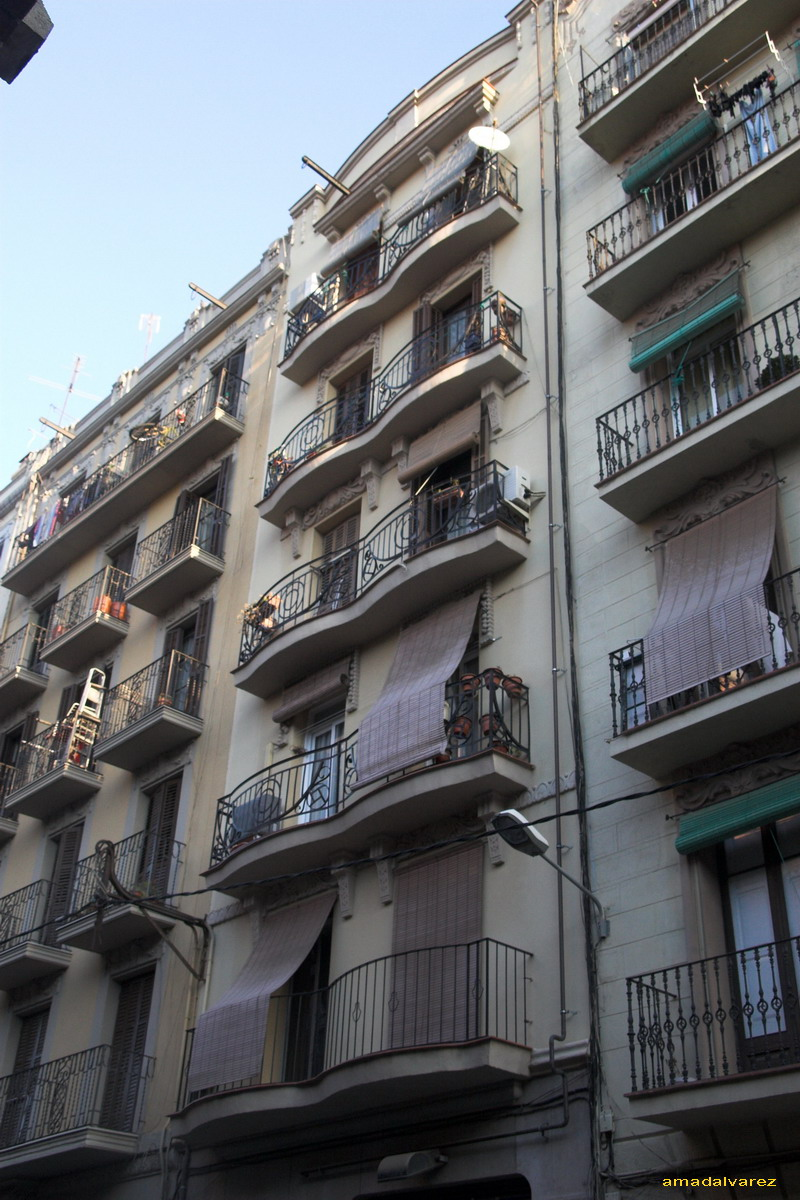
townhouse, Olivera 16

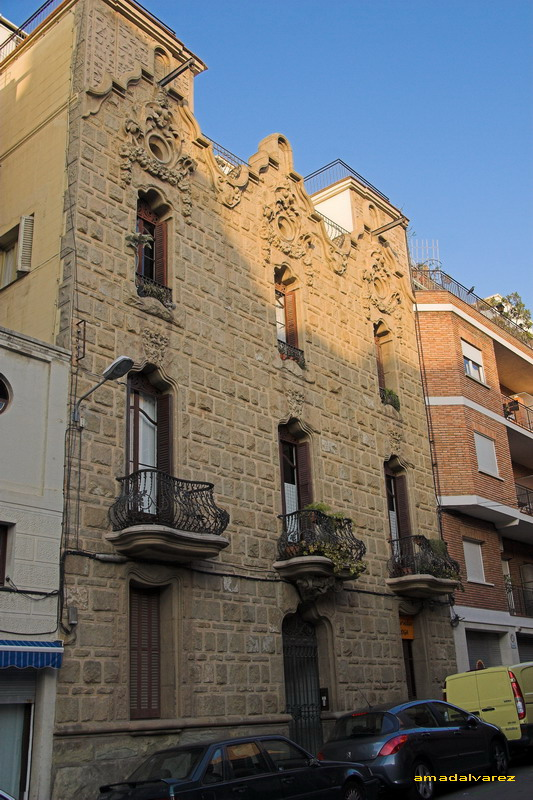
townhouse, Ravella 15

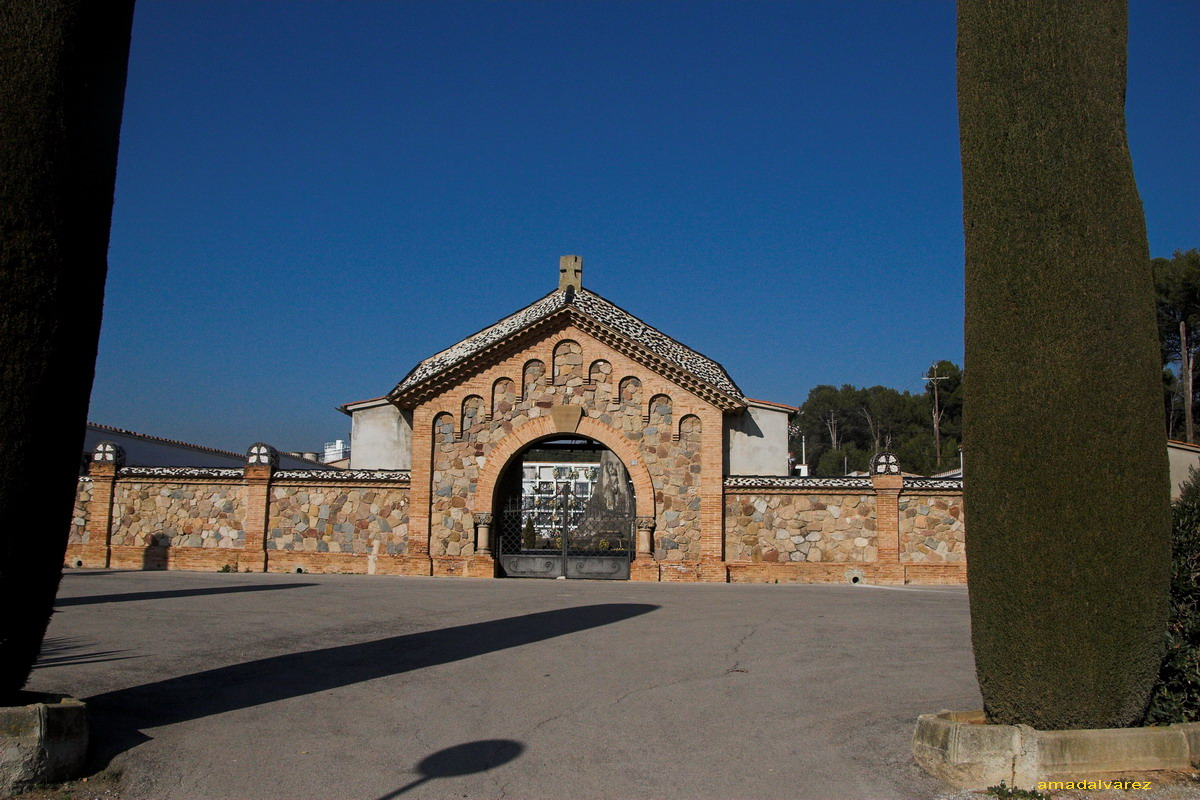
Cemetery in Palau-solità i Plegamans

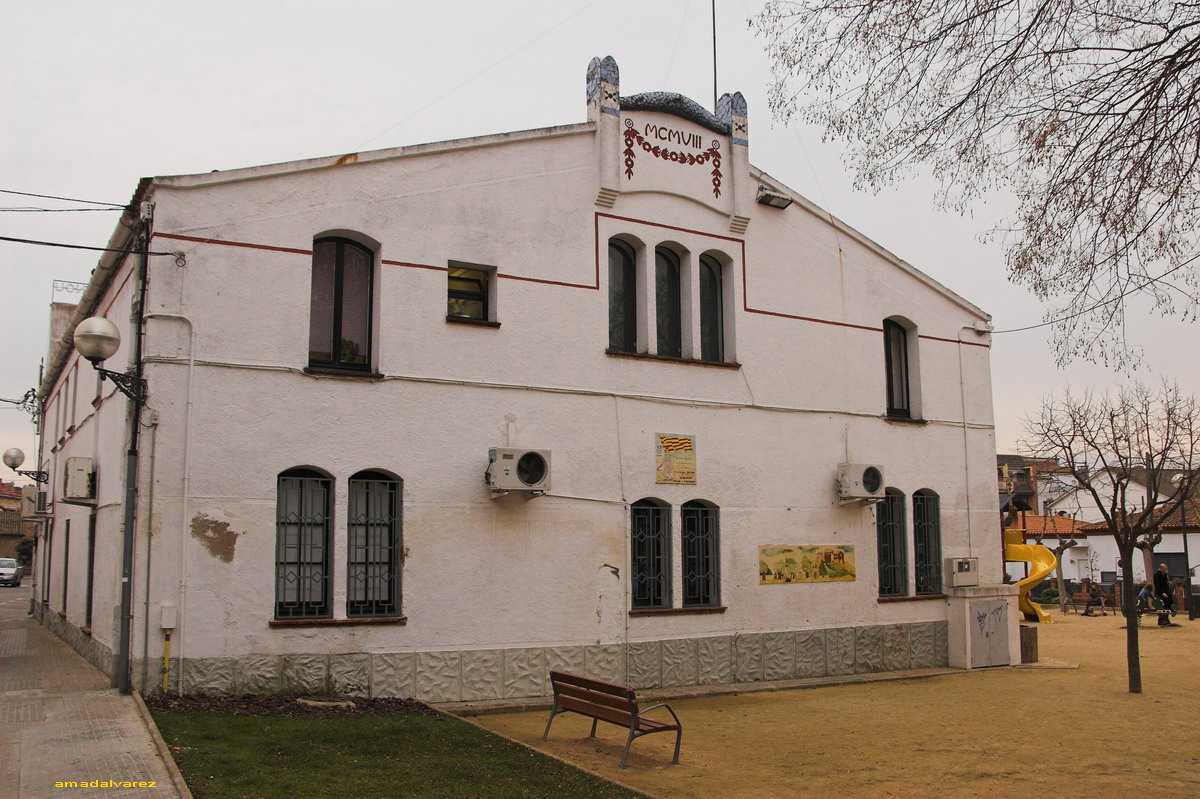
Ajuntament in Palau-solità i Plegamans

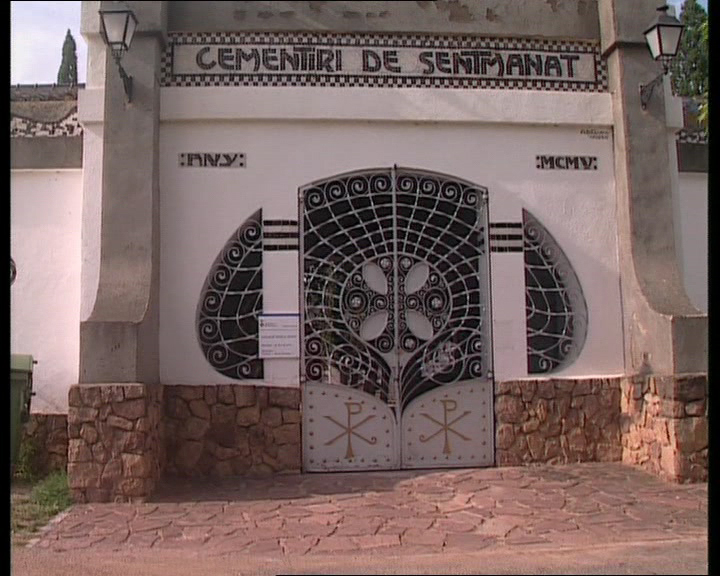
Cemetery in Sentmenat
