= Manuel Oltra =

Spanish composer

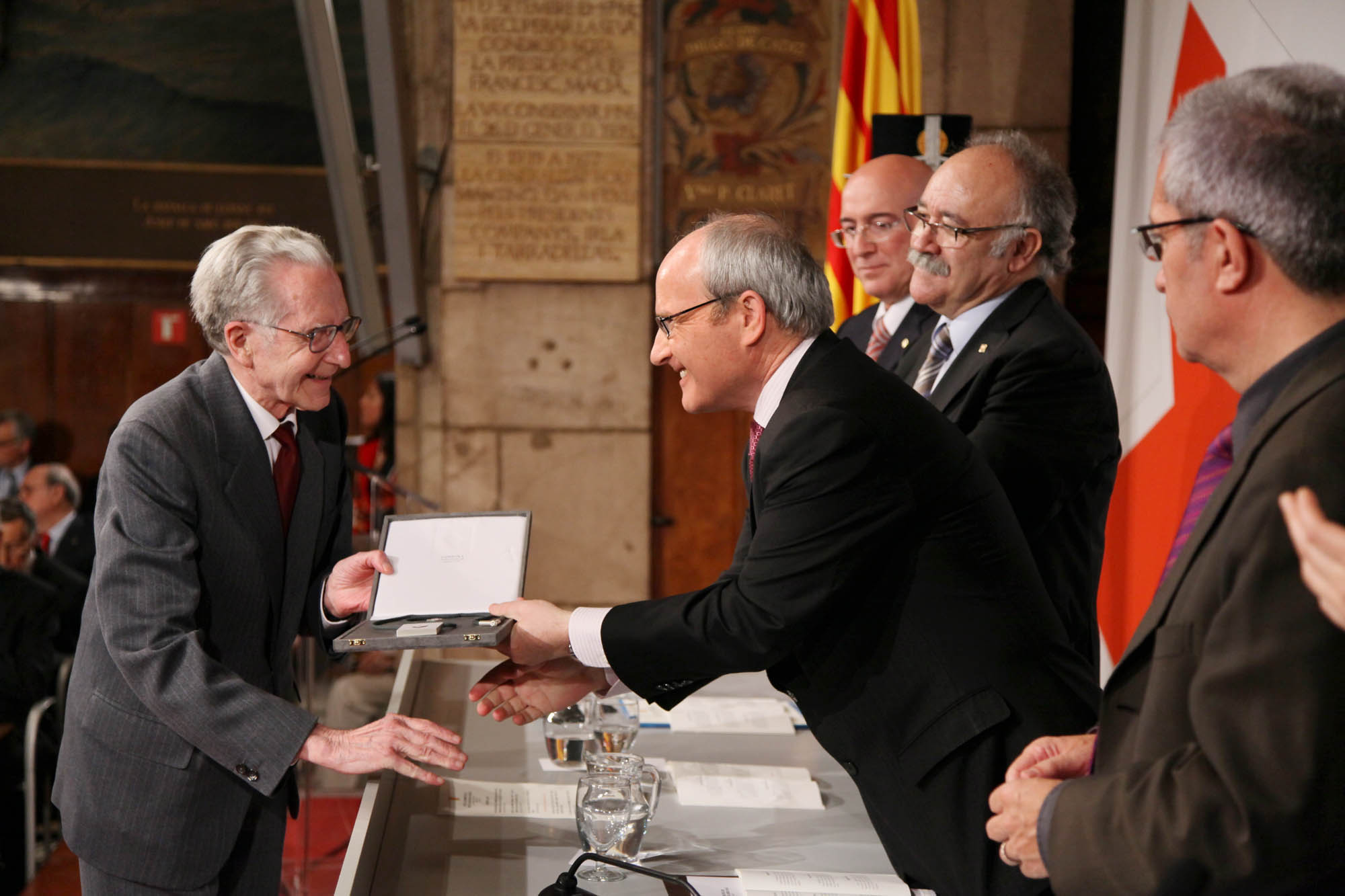
Oltra in 2010

Manuel Oltra i Ferrer (8 February 1922 – 25 September 2015) was a Spanish composer. He was known for composing music about harmony and counterpoint music. He led the Municipal Conservatory of Barcelona from 1959 until its disestablishment in 1987. Oltra was born in Valencia, Spain. He was awarded the 1994 National Music Prize of Catalonia.

Oltra died of pneumonia in Barcelona, Spain at the age of 93.
