= Vallès Symphony Orchestra =

The Orquestra Simfònica del Vallès (Spanish: Orquesta Sinfónica de Vallés), founded in 1987, is a symphony orchestra based in Sabadell, Spain. The principal conductor of the orchestra is Xavier Puig.

== See also ==
- Barcelona Symphony and Catalonia National Orchestra
- L'auditori
- Sabadell
