= Jan Cober =

Dutch conductor and clarinet player

Jan Cober (born 16 August 1951) is a Dutch conductor and clarinet player.

== Life ==
Jan Cober is the child of a musical family from the village of Thorn, Netherlands. He played the clarinet in the Royal Harmony of Thorn. He studied conducting and the clarinet at the Conservatory of Maastricht and completed both studies with a Prix d'Excellence. Between 1972 and 1977, he was the first clarinet of the Nederlandse omroeporkest (Dutch broadcast orchestra), and starting in 1977, he was the solo clarinet player at the Residentie Orkest in The Hague. He has worked with famous conductors Willem van Otterloo and Ferdinand Leitner. At an NOS broadcast course and competition for conductors led by Neeme Järvi, he entered the final rounds.

Since 1976, he teaches clarinet and conductorship at the Brabants conservatorium in Tilburg, the Maastricht Academy of Music and the Conservatory of Utrecht. Additionally, he is part of the European Institute for Conducting in the Italian city of Trento.

In 1995, Jan became the conductor of the Royal Harmonie Sainte Cécile Eijsden.

== Works dedicated to and premiered by Jan Cober ==
European Overture, Op.42 for concert band by Javier Pérez Garrido
