= Royal Harmonie Sainte Cécile Eijsden =

Royal Harmonie Sainte Cécile Eijsden (Koninklijke Harmonie Sainte Cécile Eijsden) is a concert band in Eijsden, Netherlands was founded in 1880.

Royal Harmonie Sainte Cécile Eijsden was led by director Arthur Renkin in the late 1930s until his death (1946).

In 1996, the band has successfully participated in the prestigious The International Wind Band Contest (City of Valencia) in Spain.

In 1997 and 2001, Royal Harmonie Sainte Cécile Eijsden participated in the World Music Contest (Kerkrade) (WMC) and in 2001 was found as "Vice World Champion" in the concert band division. In 2007 the band win the title in the Open Dutch Championship in the concert band section (also called the Mini WMC). In 2009, the band led by Jan Cober won the first prize in the concert band division of World Music Contest (Kerkrade).

== Conductors ==
- ???? -???? A. Bossy
- ???? -???? J. Charlier
- ???? -???? P. Gillis
- ???? -???? H. Cloos
- ???? -???? L. Purnotte
- ???? -???? G. Ruyters
- 1938 - 1946 Arthur Renkin
- ???? -???? Henri Mestrez
- ???? -???? Ch. Bardiau
- ???? -???? A. Dever Pine
- 1950 - 1968 Hubert Vanderweckene
- 1969 - 1978 Wheel Jacobs
- 1978 - 1989 Hennie Ramaekers
- 1989 - 1995 Alex Schillings
- 1995 - Jan Cober
