= Barcelona Symphony Orchestra and National Orchestra of Catalonia =

Symphony orchestra based in Barcelona, Spain

The Barcelona Symphony Orchestra and National Orchestra of Catalonia (Catalan: Orquestra Simfònica de Barcelona i Nacional de Catalunya, OBC; IPA: [uɾˈkestɾə siɱˈfɔnikə ðə βəɾsəˈlonəj nəsi.uˈnal də kətəˈluɲə]) is a symphony orchestra based in Barcelona, Catalonia. Since April 1999, the Orchestra has had its headquarters at L'Auditori. Prior to that, from its foundation to 1998, the orchestra was resident at the Palau de la Música Catalana.

Its current principal conductor is Ludovic Morlot from 2022.

== History ==
In addition to the Orquestra Simfònica del Gran Teatre del Liceu, founded in 1847 and devoted to opera and ballet, Barcelona has had several symphonic orchestras since 1888. From 1910 to 1924, a private-based Orquestra Simfònica de Barcelona gave its concerts in the Teatre Eldorado, led by Joan Lamote de Grignon. After it, the city's principal orchestra was the Orquestra Pau Casals (1920–1936), conducted by Pau Casals, and linked to the Associació Obrera de Concerts (Workers' Society for Concerts). After the Spanish Civil War (1936–1939), both the orchestra and society were banned and Casals went into exile in France.

In 1944, a new Barcelona civic orchestra – the current Orquestra Simfònica de Barcelona – was founded with the name of Barcelona Municipal Orchestra, created by the City Council (Ajuntament de Barcelona) and promoted by the Catalan conductor and composer Eduard Toldrà. Toldrà, through his leadership, helped to consolidate the orchestra's presence very early in the cultural life of the city. Barcelona has since had a regular cycle of symphonic concerts with the collaboration of the main national and foreign performers and with the aim to make classical music reach the greater public and especially to spread the work of Catalan composers.

After Toldrà's death in 1962, Rafael Ferrer became the head of the orchestra until 1967, when Antoni Ros-Marbà succeeded him. From this moment, it received the name of Orquestra Ciutat de Barcelona (City of Barcelona Orchestra, or OCB) until the constitution of the Consortium made up of the Government of Catalonia and Barcelona City Hall, in the 1994–95 season, which gave it the current name of Orquestra Simfònica de Barcelona i Nacional de Catalunya (Barcelona Symphony Orchestra and National Orchestra of Catalonia), known as OBC. In 1994–1995 season a Consortium made up of the Government of Catalonia and Barcelona City Council was constituted.

In September 2015, Kazushi Ōno became principal conductor of the OBC, with an initial contract of three years. Ōno concluded his tenure as OBC principal conductor at the close of the 2021-2022 season. In November 2021, the OBC announced the appointment of Ludovic Morlot as its next principal conductor, effective with the 2022-2023 season, with an initial contract of four seasons.

The OBC has made recordings for such labels as Decca, EMI, Auvidis, Koch, Claves and Naxos Records.

== Music directors / principal conductors ==
- Eduard Toldrà (1944–1962)
- Rafael Ferrer (1962–1967)
- Antoni Ros-Marbà (1967–1978)
- Salvador Mas (1978–1981)
- Antoni Ros-Marbà (1981–1986)
- Franz-Paul Decker (1986–1991)
- Antonio García Navarro (1991–1993)
- Lawrence Foster (1996–2002)
- Ernest Martínez Izquierdo (2002–2005)
- Eiji Oue (2006–2010)
- Pablo González Bernardo (2010–2015)
- Kazushi Ōno (2015–2022)
- Ludovic Morlot (2022–present)

== Premières performed ==
As the city's main orchestra, the OBC has performed many world premières of musical compositions, including the following:

- 1948 Xavier Montsalvatge's Simfonia mediterrània (Mediterranean Symphony).
- 1952 Jaume Pahissa's El camí (The way).
- 1960 Xavier Montsalvatge's Càntic espiritual.
- 1961 Frederic Mompou's Variacions sobre un tema de Chopin for orchestra.
- 1963 Xavier Montsalvatge's Desintegració morfològica de la xacona de J. S. Bach (Morphological disintegration of J.S. Bach's chaconne), and other of the composer's works.
- 1964 Joaquim Homs' Invention for orchestra; other Homs works have had their premieres by OBC: Presències (1967), Brief symphony (1972), Nonet (1979)...
- 1974 Josep Soler's opera-oratorio Oedipus et Iocasta (many Soler works have been first performed by the OBC).
- 1997 Salvador Brotons' oratorio Stabat Mater
