= Municipal Conservatory of Barcelona =

Coordinates: 41°23′45.04″N 2°10′3.47″E

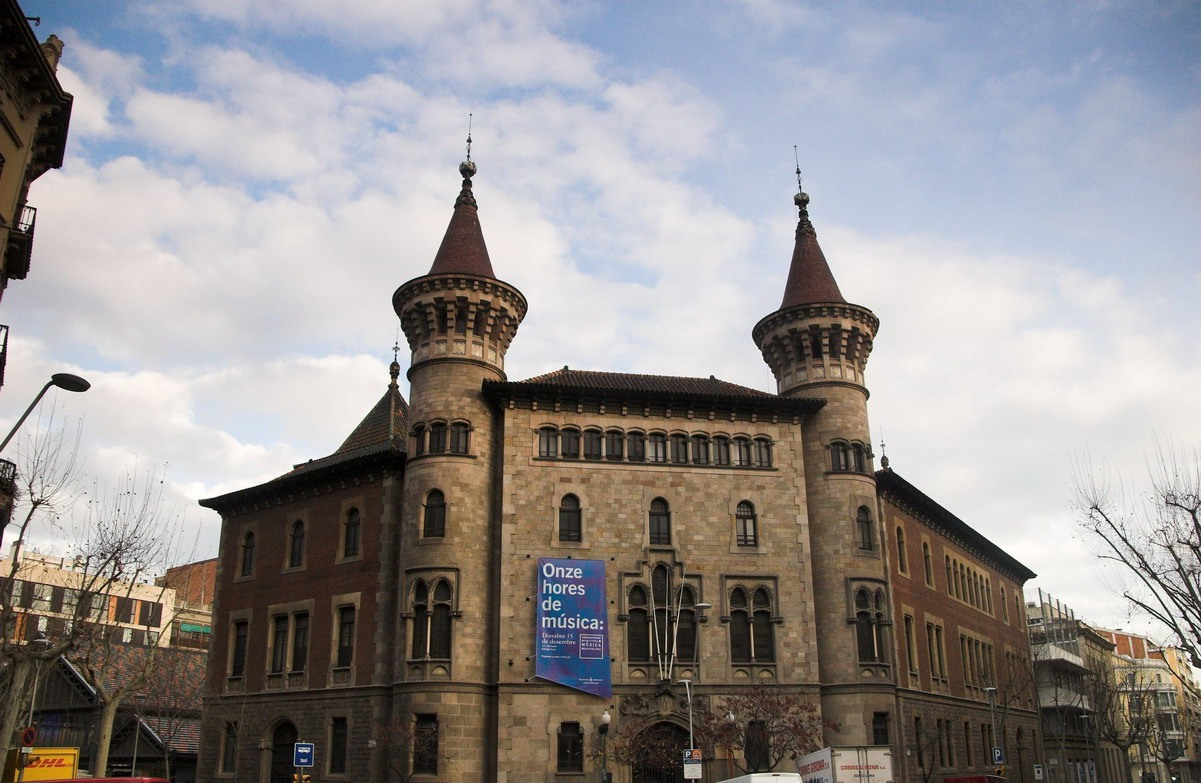
The Conservatory building, designed by Antoni de Falguera.

The Municipal Conservatory of Barcelona (Catalan: Conservatori Municipal de Música de Barcelona, IPA: [kunsəɾβəˈtɔɾi munisiˈpal də ˈmuzikə ðə βəɾsəˈlonə]) is a teaching institution, which is devoted to music education. The present ownership belongs to the Barcelona City Hall.

== History ==
The beginnings took place in 1886; it was founded by the Municipal Band of Barcelona as a school of music, so that the new musicians of the band could be trained there. Other cities that had a band had made the same thing, since they had the same necessity.

The first director was ca:Josep Rodoreda, until in 1896 Antoni Nicolau replaced him. In 1911, the position of assistant director was created. The first assistant director was Enric Morera until 1935. In 1930, when a new director was needed for the band, Lluís Millet was elected. He was more conservative and he was preferred by the Barcelona City Hall. His election for this position created some polemics.

In the meantime, in 1928 the conservatory building was placed in the corner between Bruc and València streets.

Millet left the position in the year that the Spanish Civil War ended (1939). The next year, ca:Joan Baptista Lambert replaced him until 1945. During this time, the institution was transformed from a music school into a conservatory. In 1945 a new studies plan was introduced, which was based on the 1942 decree that unified the studies in all the conservatories of Spain.

When Lambert died Joaquim Zamacois was the new director until 1965. During this period, contacts with other European conservatories were made, important musicians from all Europe were invited, and a new department for ancient music was created. It was also created the Barcelona Music Museum. In 1952 Joan Pich i Santasusana was appointed assistant director, first provisionally until 1968 and officially appointed until 1977. According to the arrival of democracy to Spain, important efforts were made in order to update this institution, and also to decentralize it, since it was during that time the only public educational music institution of the city. Moreover, during Pich's term of office a new studies plan was introduced, according to a 1966 decree. This studies plan ruled the professional music education for four decades. So that the students could perform concerts during their formation, the construction of an auditorium was envisaged, but Xavier Turull (who was appointed director in 1977) inaugurated it. During this period, the students orchestra (conducted by Edmon Colomer) had a certain stability, the Music Museum was moved to the Quadras house, and the first steps in order to create the Library of the Conservatory were made. He resigned in 1982 due to disagreements with the City Hall, and first Maria Cateura and afterwards ca:Marçal Gols succeeded him. He made important reforms, decentralizing the institution, limiting the registration in certain instruments, reducing the teachers in certain specialities, and promoting the registration in string instruments. But not everyone in the institution understood these reforms, and he resigned. He was replaced by Pilar Figueras and then Francesca Ruiz (1988–1997) and Carme Vilà.

In 2001, when the Education Department of the Generalitat de Catalunya opened the Superior School of Music of Catalonia (ESMuC), the Municipal Superior Conservatory of Music of Barcelona did not teach superior music studies any more, and thus it changed its name. At the same time, many teachers began to teach in the new institution.

Since then, the Conservatory has adapted its task to the new situation, inside the Municipal Institute of Education of Barcelona. In this context, many municipal schools of music have been created as well.

== Notable alumni ==
- Adelaida Ferré Gomis (1881-1955), historian, teacher, lacemaker, embroiderer, and folklorist

== Notable teachers ==
- Conxita Badia i Millàs
- ca:Antoni Besses i Bonet
- Miquel Farré i Mallofré
- ca:Francesc Xavier Joaquín Planes
- Joan Massià i Prats
- ca:Manuel Oltra i Ferrer
- Eduard Toldrà i Soler
- ca:Montserrat Torrent i Serra
- Joan Dotras i Vila

== Bibliography ==
- Gran Enciclopèdia de la Música (2000). Barcelona: Gran Enciclopèdia Catalana. Vol. 2.
- AVIÑOA, Xosé (1986): Cent anys de Conservatori. Barcelona: Ajuntament de Barcelona.
