= Antoni Nicolau =

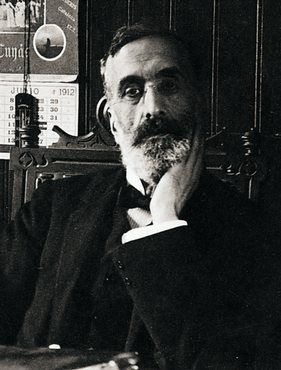
Antoni Nicolau

Antoni Nicolau i Parera (8 June 1858 — 26 February 1933) was a Spanish composer from Catalonia.

== Life ==
Nicolau was born and died in Barcelona. He was a student of Juan Bautista Pujol.

== Works, editions and recordings ==
- Raïms i espigues. Cançó de la Moreneta on Jacint Verdaguer i el lied català. M. Teresa Garrigosa, soprano; Emili Blasco, piano La mà de Guido, 2005.
