= L'Auditori =

Concert hall in Barcelona, Spain

Coordinates: 41°23′54″N 2°11′08″E

L'Auditori

L'Auditori (Catalan pronunciation: [ləwðiˈtɔɾi]) is a modern building of 42,000 square metres designed by the architect Rafael Moneo, opened on 22 March 1999, in Barcelona, Catalonia, Spain. It is in the centre of the new pole of urban development of Plaça de les Glòries, which brings together the three widest and longest avenues in the city (Diagonal, Gran Via and Meridiana) near the old centre of the city, its ‘Avenue’, next to the National Theatre, Glòries junction, the opening of the Diagonal on to the sea, district 22@ and the Forum area.

The building combines sober external modernity with Sala 1 Pau Casals with 2,200 seats, Sala 2 Oriol Martorell with 600 seats and Sala 3 Tete Montoliu with 400 seats. In the central access atrium, a monumental cubic glass light has been built in the shape of an impluvium, decorated with sketched paintings by Pablo Palazuelo. The acoustics of the halls has been carefully studied within the project by the specialised engineer Higini Arau.

In the same musical complex, there are the centres of the Orquestra Simfònica de Barcelona, the Escola Superior de Música de Catalunya and the Museu de la Música. This makes the Auditori a focus of musical life in the city in the different fields of divulgation, teaching and research.

== See also ==
- List of theatres and concert halls in Barcelona
- List of concert halls
