= Orquestra Simfònica del Gran Teatre del Liceu =

Opera orchestra based in Barcelona, Spain

The Orquestra Simfònica del Gran Teatre del Liceu (Symphony Orchestra of the Gran Teatre del Liceu) is the opera orchestra of the Gran Teatre del Liceu in Barcelona, Spain. Founded concurrently with the theatre in 1847 (actually, it continues the orchestra of the Liceu previous theatre, founded in 1837 and active since 1838), it is the oldest orchestra still working in Barcelona, and the oldest in Spain. The orchestra also performs symphony concerts at such venues as the Palau de la Música Catalana and at L'Auditori.

The first conductor of the orchestra was Marià Obiols. The orchestra subsequently worked with guest conductors, including the composers Manuel de Falla, Alexander Glazunov, Richard Strauss, Igor Stravinsky, Ottorino Respighi, and Pietro Mascagni, but with no principal conductor or music director. The first music director was Ernest Xancó, who took up the post in 1959 and served in that capacity until 1961. Subsequent music directors have included Uwe Mund (1987-1994), Bertrand de Billy (1999-2004), Sebastian Weigle (2004–2008), and Michael Boder (2008-2012). In October 2010, the company announced the appointment of Josep Pons as its next music director, as of September 2012, for an initial contract of 6 years.

== Premieres performed by the orchestra ==
The Liceu opera house has been the location for the world premieres of several works, and for the Spanish premieres of many musical works, such as the following:

- 1847 (April 4) Marià Obiols' cantata Il regio imene, the first musical work performed by the orchestra in the inauguration day
- 1853 (January 8) Temistocle Solera's Spanish opera La hermana de Pelayo, first opera premiered by the orchestra
- 1874 (April 14) Felipe Pedrell's opera L'ultimo Abenzerraggio
- 1892 (May 14) Tomás Bretón's opera Garín
- 1895 (May 8) Isaac Albéniz's opera Henry Clifford
- 1896 (January 5) Isaac Albéniz's opera Pepita Jiménez
- 1902 (January 4) Felipe Pedrell's grand opera Els Pirineus
- 1903 (December 3) Joan Manén's opera Acté
- 1906 (January 20) Enric Morera's opera Empòrium
- 1913 (January 15) Jaume Pahissa's first opera Gal·la Placídia
- 1923 (March 31) Jaume Pahissa's Marianela
- 1929 Manuel Blancafort's symphonic poem Matí de festa a Puiggraciós
- 1932 (March 3) Joan Manén's opera Neró i Acté
- 1948 (January 10) Xavier Montsalvatge's children opera El gato con botas
- 1948 (January 10) Carlos Surinach's El mozo que casó con mujer brava
- 1950 (December 14) Conrado del Campo's Lola la Piconera
- 1955 (December 19) Joaquín Rodrigo's ballet Pavana Real
- 1956 (April 28) Frederic Mompou and Xavier Montsalvatge's ballet Perlimplinada
- 1961 (November 24) Manuel de Falla and Ernesto Halffter's scenic cantata Atlàntida
- 1962 (December 11) Xavier Montsalvatge's Una voce in off
- 1974 (January 19) Matilde Salvador's Vinatea
- 1986 (May 22) Josep Soler's Oedipus et Iocasta
- 1988 (September 21) Xavier Benguerel's scenic cantata Llibre vermell
- 1989 (September 24) Leonardo Balada's opera Cristóbal Colón
- 1990 (October 5) Xavier Benguerel's oratory Requiem for Salvador Espriu, at the Torroella de Montgrí International Festival of Music
- 2000 (October 2) José Luis Turina's opera D.Q., Don Quijote en Barcelona, with settings by La Fura dels Baus
- 2004 (November 3) Joan Guinjoan's opera Gaudí

== Recent notable events ==
In the early 2020s, the Orquestra Simfònica del Gran Teatre del Liceu was involved in several major opera, concert and outreach projects connected with the Liceu's 175th anniversary period and with the orchestra's wider artistic profile.

In April 2022, the orchestra took part in the Liceu's 175th-anniversary gala concert, conducted by Marco Armiliato and staged by Valentina Carrasco. The event brought together singers including Sondra Radvanovsky, Lisette Oropesa, Iréne Theorin, Ludovic Tézier, Joseph Calleja, Michael Fabiano, Marta Mathéu and Giacomo Prestia, with excerpts from Macbeth, Lucia di Lammermoor and Turandot.

In the same season, soprano Sonya Yoncheva made her house debut at the Gran Teatre del Liceu in a solo concert with the orchestra, conducted by Nayden Todorov, performing arias by Verdi and Puccini. The concert took place on 30 April 2022 and was broadcast live by Catalunya Música.

In June 2022, Josep Pons and the orchestra took Mahler's Fifth Symphony outside the theatre in concerts at the Teatre Kursaal in Manresa and the Auditori Enric Granados in Lleida, as part of an effort to consolidate the orchestra's presence beyond the Liceu building.

In October 2022, the Liceu presented the world premiere of La gata perduda, a community opera co-created with Barcelona's Raval neighbourhood, with music by Arnau Tordera I and a libretto by Victoria Szpunberg. The project involved around 1,000 people directly or indirectly and later received several awards, including the 2023 Max Award for best musical or lyric show and an Ópera XXI award for best initiative or project contributing to the promotion of opera activity.

In the 2022–2023 season, the orchestra performed Puccini's Tosca in a new production directed by Rafael R. Villalobos and conducted by Henrik Nánási. The production featured a large cast including Maria Agresta, Sondra Radvanovsky, Emily Magee and Monica Zanettin as Tosca, with tenors Michael Fabiano, Vittorio Grigolo and Antonio Corianò, and baritones Željko Lučić and George Gagnidze as Scarpia.

The same season included Puccini's Il trittico, conducted by Susanna Mälkki, with a cast including Lise Davidsen, Ermonela Jaho, Ambrogio Maestri, Daniela Barcellona, Brandon Jovanovich, Ruth Iniesta and Iván Ayón-Rivas.

In May and June 2023, the orchestra and chorus performed Wagner's Parsifal under Josep Pons in Claus Guth's production. The cast included Nikolai Schukoff, Elena Pankratova, René Pape, Matthias Goerne, Evgeny Nikitin and Paata Burchuladze; the production was later streamed internationally through OperaVision. Pons received an Ópera XXI award for musical direction for his work on the production.

In June 2023, the orchestra made its debut at the Opéra national de Paris with Bartók's Bluebeard's Castle, featuring Iréne Theorin and Bryn Terfel. The Liceu described the appearance as a historic milestone in the trajectory of both the orchestra and the theatre.

In March 2025, the orchestra performed Wagner's Lohengrin in a new production directed by Katharina Wagner and conducted by Josep Pons. The production featured singers including Klaus Florian Vogt, Miina-Liisa Värelä, Elisabeth Teige and Tanja Ariane Baumgartner.

== Music Directors ==
- 1959-1961 Ernest Xancó
- 1981-1984 Eugenio Marco
- 1987-1994 Uwe Mund
- 1999-2004 Bertrand de Billy
- 2004–2008 Sebastian Weigle
- 2008-2012 Michael Boder
- 2012–present Josep Pons

== Media ==
"Siccome un di caduto il sole"
The orchestra providing accompaniment to the opera Les pêcheurs de perles by Georges Bizet in 1929
