= Liceu =

Opera house in Barcelona, Spain

Gran Teatre del Liceu
- Teatro del Liceo de Montesión (1837–1847)
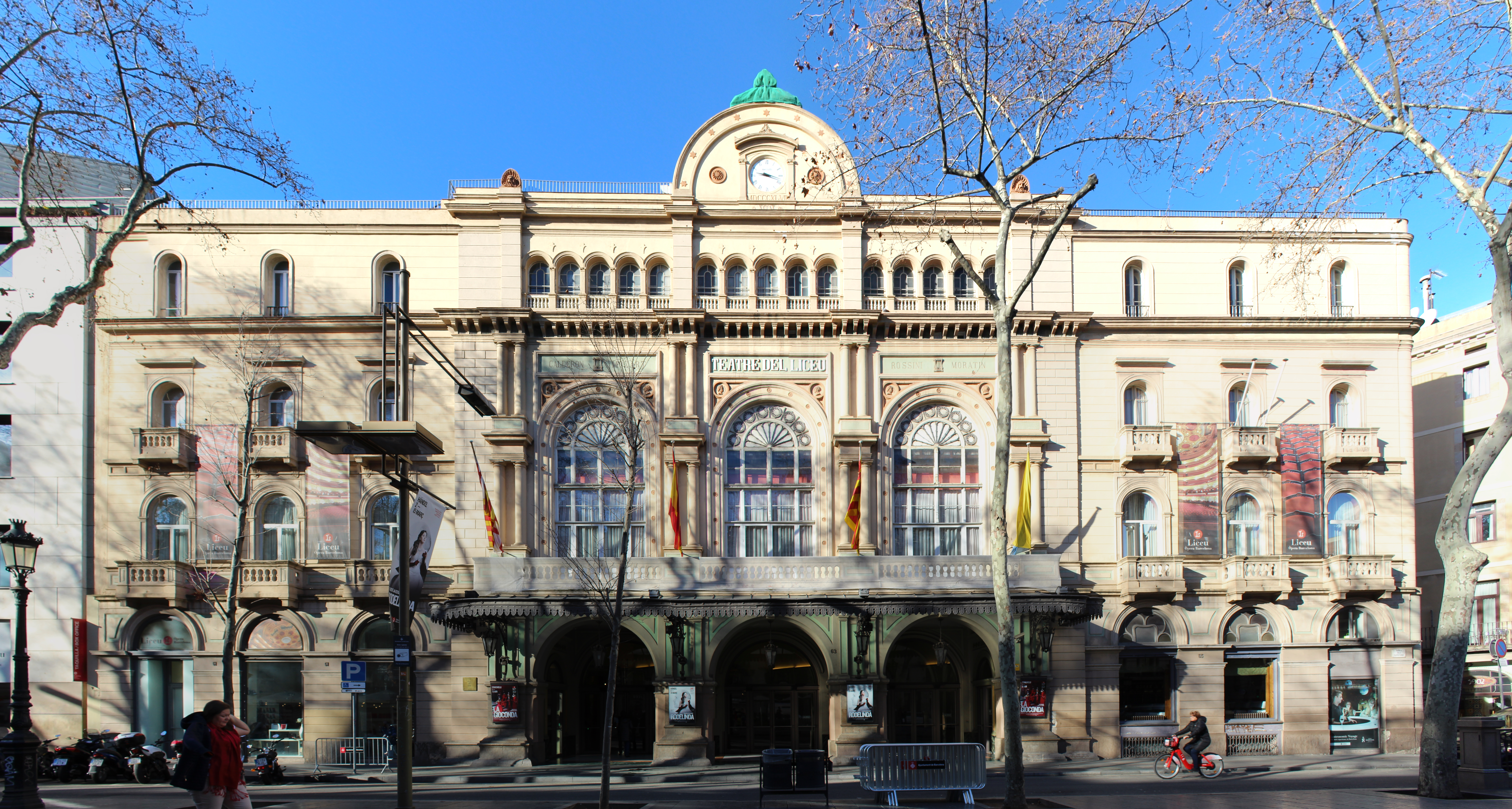
- Liceu façade towards La Rambla
- Interactive map of Gran Teatre del Liceu
- Address: La Rambla, 51–59; Barcelona, Catalonia, Spain
- Coordinates: 41°22′49″N 2°10′25″E
- Owner: Fundació del Gran Teatre del Liceu
- Capacity: 2,292 seats
- Type: Theater
- Event: Opera
- Public transit: Liceu

Construction
- Opened: 4 April 1847; 179 years ago (founded 1837 at another location)
- Reopened: 20 April 1862 (after 1861 fire); 7 October 1999 (after 1994 fire)
- Architects: Miquel Garriga i Roca (1847); Josep Oriol Mestres (1862); Ignasi de Solà-Morales (1999)

Website
- www.liceubarcelona.cat

The Gran Teatre del Liceu (Catalan: [ˈɡɾan teˈatɾə ðəl liˈsɛw]; Spanish: Gran Teatro del Liceo [ˈɡɾan teˈatɾo ðel liˈθeo]; English: "Great Lyceum Theater"), or simply Liceu, is an opera theater in Barcelona, Catalonia. Situated on La Rambla, it is the city's oldest theater building still in use for its original purpose.

Founded in 1837 at another location, the Liceu opened at its current address on 4 April 1847. The theater was rebuilt after fires in 1861 and 1994, and reopened on 20 April 1862 and 7 October 1999. On 7 November 1893, on the opening night of the season, an anarchist threw two bombs into the stalls. About twenty people were killed, and many more were injured.

Between 1847 and 1989, the 2,338-seat Liceu was the largest opera house in Europe by capacity. Since 1994, the Liceu has been owned and managed by a public foundation whose board of trustees represents the Ministry of Culture, the Generalitat de Catalunya, the Provincial Deputation of Barcelona and the City Council of Barcelona. The theater has its own choir (the Cor del Gran Teatre del Liceu), symphony orchestra (the Orquestra Simfònica del Gran Teatre del Liceu) and college of music (the Conservatori Superior de Música del Liceu).

== History ==
=== Origins (1837–1847) ===
In 1837, the Liceo Filodramático de Montesión (Philodramatic Lyceum of Montesión, now named Conservatori Superior de Música del Liceu) was founded in Barcelona to promote musical education (hence the name "Liceo", or lyceum.) It organized opera productions performed by Liceo students.

A theater (Teatro de Montesión, or Teatro del Liceo de Montesión) was founded in a convent building, and plays and operas were performed. The first performance was Vicenzo Bellini's Norma, on 3 February 1838. The repertoire was Italian, the most-performed composers were Donizetti, Mercadante, Bellini and Rossini. The Barcelona premiere of Hérold's Zampa was held here.

In 1838, the society changed its name to Liceo Dramático Filarmónico de S. M. la Reina Isabel II (Dramatic Philharmonic Lyceum of H.M. Queen Isabel II). Lack of space and pressure from the nuns who formerly owned the convent and had the right to return motivated the Liceu to leave its location in 1844. The last performance there was on 8 September of that year.

The Trinitarian convent building in Barcelona's central La Rambla was purchased, and the Liceu's managers entrusted Joaquim de Gispert d'Anglí with construction of a new building. Two societies were created: a "building society" and an "auxiliary building society." Shareholders of the building society obtained the permanent right of use of some theater boxes and seats in exchange for their economic contributions. Auxiliary-building-society shareholders contributed the rest of the money necessary in exchange for rights to other spaces in the building, including some shops and the private Círculo del Liceo club.

Unlike other European cities where the monarchy was responsible for the building and upkeep of opera houses, the Liceu was funded by private shareholders of what would become the Societat del Gran Teatre del Liceu (Great Liceu Theater Society, organized similarly to a trading company or societat). This is reflected in the building's architecture; there is no royal box. Since the queen did not contribute to construction, the society's name was changed to Liceo Filarmónico Dramático.

With Miquel Garriga i Roca as the architect, construction began on 11 April 1845. The theater was opened on 4 April 1847.

=== Opening, fire and rebuilding (1847–1862) ===
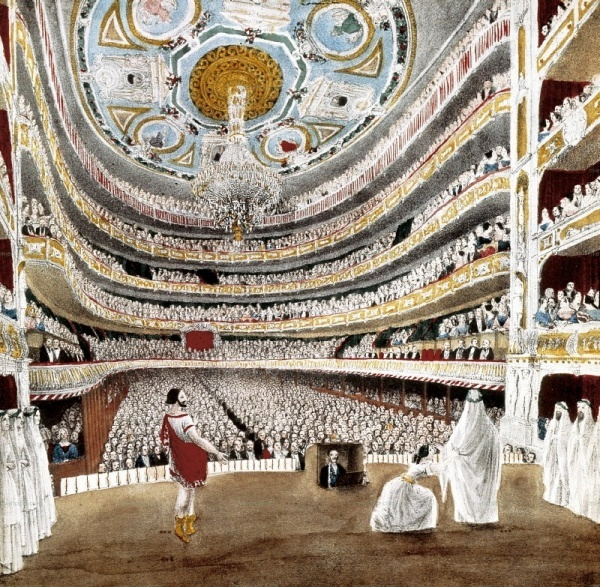
View of the house from the stage, 1847

The opening presented a mixed program which included the premieres of a José Melchior Gomis musical ouverture, the historical play Don Fernando de Antequera by Ventura de la Vega, the ballet La Rondeña (The Girl From Ronda) by Josep Jurch, and the cantata Il regio himene with music by Liceu musical director Marià Obiols. The first complete opera, Donizetti's Anna Bolena, was presented on 17 April 1847.

Liceu was the biggest opera house in Europe, with 3,500 seats. Other operas performed during the first year were (in chronological order) I due Foscari (Verdi), Il bravo (Mercadante), Parisina d'Este (Donizetti), Giovanna d'Arco (Verdi), Leonora (Mercadante), Ernani (Verdi), Norma (Bellini), Linda di Chamounix (Donizetti) and Il barbiere di Siviglia (Rossini).

The building was severely damaged by fire on 9 April 1861, but was rebuilt with a design by architect Josep Oriol Mestres and re-opened on 20 April 1862 with a performance of Bellini's I puritani. Of the old building, only the facade, the entrance hall and the foyer (Hall of Mirrors) remained.

=== Bombing and civil war (1862–1940) ===
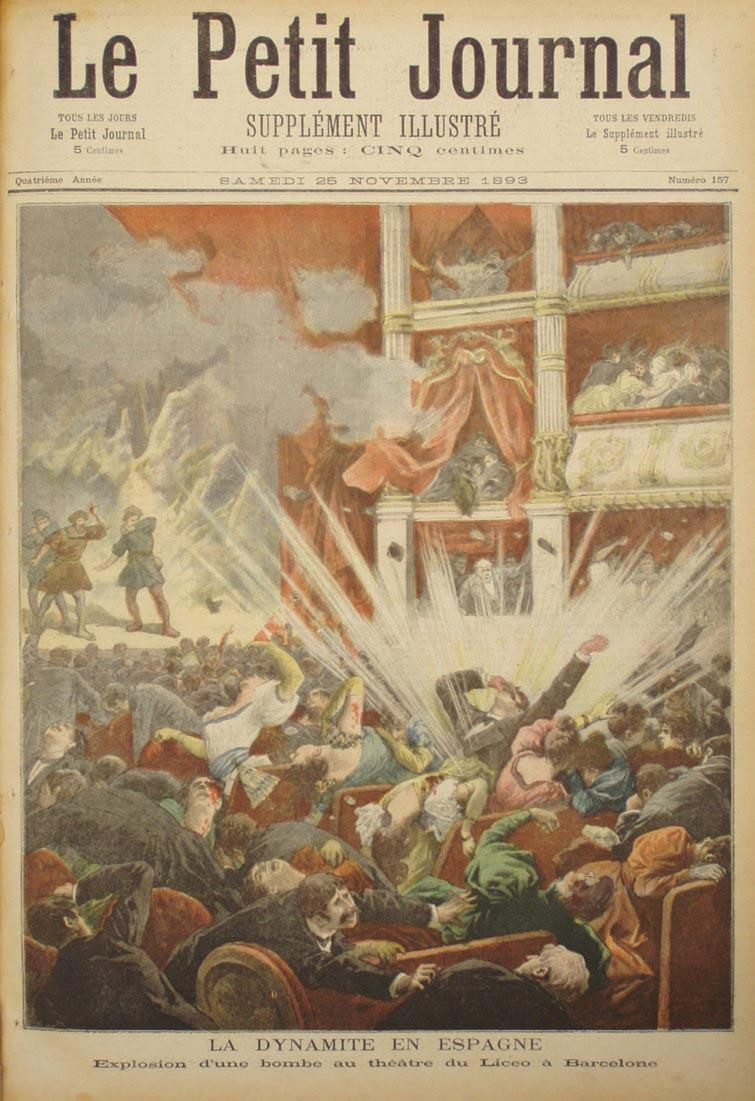
Explosion in the Liceu by anarchist Santiago Salvador on the cover of the newspaper Le Petit Journal, 1893

On 7 November 1893, during the season's opening night and the second act of Rossini’s opera Guillaume Tell, two Orsini bombs were thrown into the Liceu's stalls. Although only one of the bombs exploded, about twenty people were killed and many more were injured. The attack by anarchist Santiago Salvador shocked Barcelona, and became symbolic of the era's social unrest. The Liceu re-opened its doors on 18 January 1894, but the seats occupied by those killed were not used for a number of years. The second bomb was displayed at the Van Gogh Museum in 2007, during the exhibition "Barcelona around 1900".

In 1909, the auditorium was renovated. Spanish neutrality during World War I allowed the Catalan textile industry to amass enormous wealth by supplying the warring parties. The 1920s were prosperous; the Liceu became established, welcoming leading singers, conductors and companies such as Sergei Diaghilev's Ballets Russes.

When the Second Spanish Republic was proclaimed in 1931, political instability triggered a financial crisis for the Liceu which was overcome with subsidies from the Barcelona City Council and the regional Catalonia government. The theater was nationalized during the Spanish Civil War and was renamed Teatre del Liceu – Teatre Nacional de Catalunya (Liceu Opera House – the National Theater of Catalonia); its opera seasons were suspended. After the civil war, in 1939, the Liceu was returned to its original owners.

=== "Silver Age" and crisis (1940–1980) ===
From 1940 to the 1960s, the seasons were high-quality. In 1955 the Bayreuth Festival Company visited. They performed Parsifal, Tristan und Isolde and Die Walküre, with innovative sets by Wieland Wagner and were enthusiastically received. An economic crisis affected the theater during the 1970s; the privately based organization could not afford the increasing cost of modern opera productions, and overall quality declined.

=== New direction and second fire (1980–1994) ===
The death of Joan Antoni Pàmias in 1980 revealed the need for the intervention of official bodies if the Liceu was to remain a leading opera house. In 1981, the Generalitat de Catalunya, Barcelona's City Council and the Societat del Gran Teatre del Liceu created the Consorci del Gran Teatre del Liceu (Consortium of the Great Liceu Theater) responsible for the theater's management.

The Provincial Deputation of Barcelona and the Spanish Ministry of Culture joined the consortium in 1985 and 1986, respectively. The consortium attracted the public back to the Liceu quickly with improvements in its artistic standard. This included a more complete and up-to-date perspective of the nature of an opera performance, improvements to the choir and orchestra, careful casting, and attracting public interest to aspects of productions other than the leading roles. This approach, coupled with new economic support and a more-discerning public, resulted in quality productions.

The consortium maintained high standards in casting, production and public loyalty (measured by attendance) until a 31 January 1994 fire which destroyed the building, caused by a spark that fell on the curtain during a routine repair during the run of Paul Hindemith's Mathis der Maler. The following opera was scheduled to be Puccini's Turandot.

Public and institutional response was unanimous on the need to rebuild the opera house on the same site with improved facilities. The new Liceu is the result of efforts to preserve parts of the building unaffected by the fire which had also survived the 1861 fire. The auditorium was rebuilt with the same layout, with new the roof paintings by Perejaume and state-of-the-art stage technology.

The theater became public to rebuild and improve it. The Fundació del Gran Teatre del Liceu (Great Liceu Theater Foundation) was created, and the Societat del Gran Teatre del Liceu handed over ownership of the building to the foundation. Some stakeholders disagreed with the decision, which was unsuccessfully challenged in court.

=== Reopening (1994–present) ===
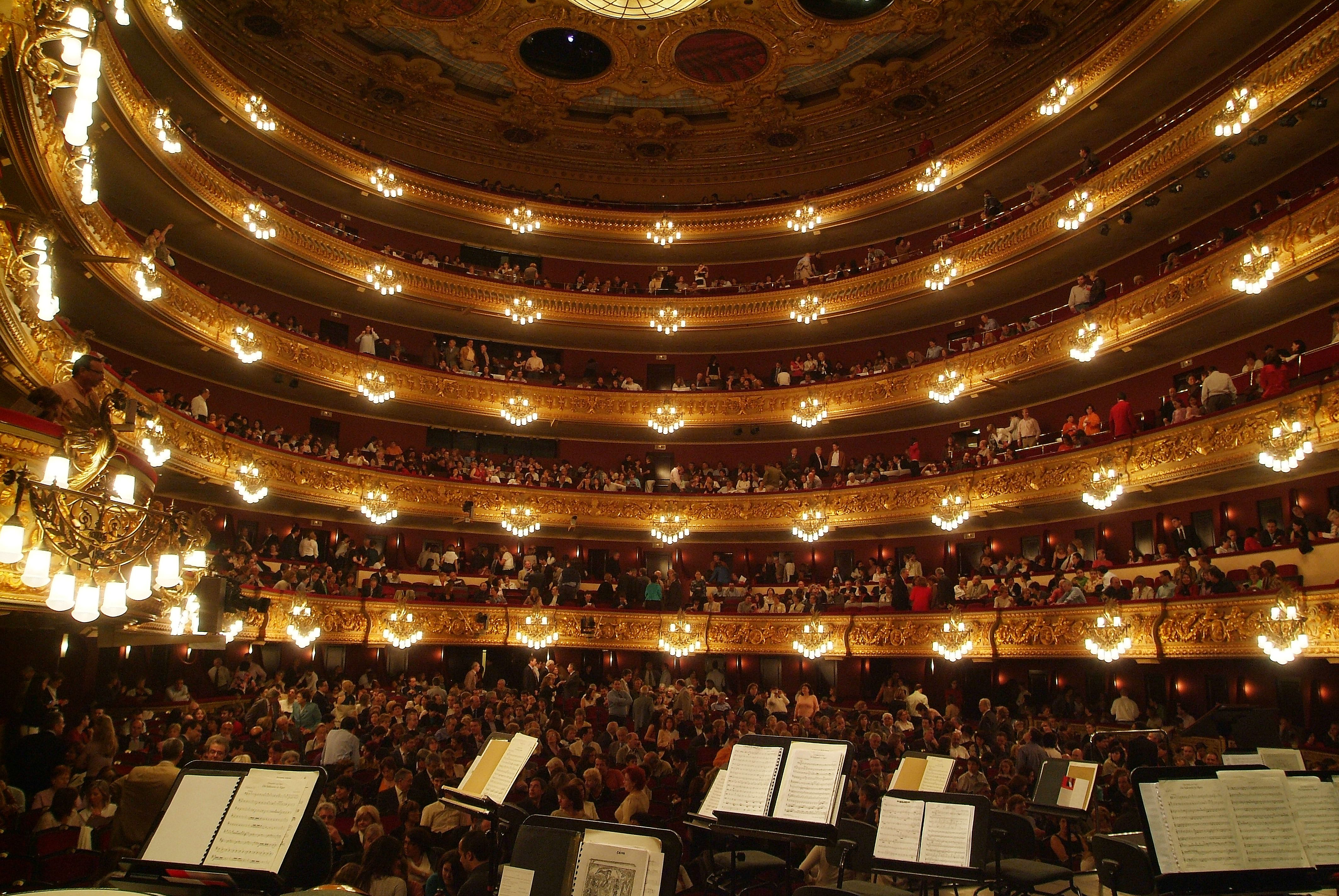
The auditorium after the 1999 reconstruction

From 1994 until the Liceu's reopening in 1999, Barcelona's opera seasons were performed in the Palau Sant Jordi arena (some large-scale performances in 1994), Palau de la Música Catalana, and Teatre Victòria. The rebuilt, improved and expanded theater opened on 7 October 1999 with Puccini's Turandot, the next opera in the season at the time of the 1994 fire. The new venue had the same traditional horseshoe-shaped auditorium, with improved technical, rehearsal, office and educational facilities, a new rehearsal hall, a new chamber-opera and small-performance hall, and more public space. The architects for the rebuilding were Ignasi de Solà-Morales and Xavier Fabré i Lluís Dilmé.

Surtitles, projected onto a screen above the proscenium, are used for all opera performances and some lieder concerts. An electronic libretto system provides translations (into English, Spanish or Catalan) on small, individual monitors for most seats.

During the COVID-19 pandemic in 2020, the Liceu marked Spain's lockdown end with a performance for an audience of 2,292 house plants which was livestreamed on social media. Each plant was then donated to healthcare workers at the Hospital Clinic of Barcelona.

== Building ==
The theater is in La Rambla, in downtown Barcelona. It has two facades, since the other two sides were surrounded until 1994 by residential buildings.

Some parts of the earlier building remain:

- The main façade in La Rambla (1847)
- The hall and the staircase (1861), with a Vallmitjana statue of Music (1901)
- The romantically-ornamental foyer (Saló de Miralls, or Hall of Mirrors, 1847), with paintings of musicians, singers and dancers from the era of Pasta, Rubini, Donizetti, Bellini, Gluck, and Marie Taglioni. It was partially redecorated in 1877 by Elies Rogent, and the roof painting of the Parnassus dates to this period.

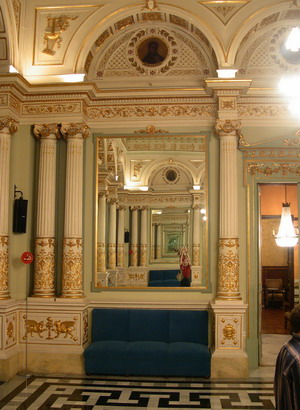
The Saló dels Miralls (Hall of Mirrors), preserved after the 1994 fire

The auditorium was rebuilt after the 1994 fire as an improved recreation of the 1861 auditorium. It has a seating capacity of 2,292 (making the Liceu one of Europe's largest opera houses), and is a typical Italian horseshoe-shaped theater with a maximum length and width of 33 and 27 metres (108 and 89 feet). The auditorium has a platea (main floor) and five balconies. Boxes with small rooms attached are in front of the stage, on the platea and in some galleries. There are no significant physical divisions between boxes; a low screen separates one box from another. There are no columns in the theater except inside the platea, making the balconies look like a golden horseshoe without visual interruptions. The amfiteatre ubicare is a projection of the first balcony with a less-pronounced horseshoe shape accommodating three rows of seats, considered the best in the theater.

Building expenses were covered by the sale of boxes and seats. Boxes were lavishly decorated by their owners, but they were destroyed in the 1994 fire. The proscenium reproduces the old one, which was rebuilt in 1909. It has a large central arch with two Corinthian columns on both sides and, among the columns, four tiers of boxes. These wider, more-luxurious boxes are known as banyeres ("bathtubs").

The auditorium ornamentation reproduces that of 1909: sumptuous, with the golden and polychrome plaster moldings usual in 19th-century European theaters. Its brass lamps have glass in the shape of a drake. The stalls, on the main floor, are made of strained iron and red velvet.

Modern features were introduced in the reconstruction. The eight circular paintings in the roof and the three in the proscenium, lost in the fire, have been re-created by the contemporary artist Perejaume. The stage curtain is by Catalan designer Antoni Miró. The new hemispheric lamp in the center of the roof is a platform for technical facilities (lighting, sound and computer).

Other technical facilities are control and projecting cabins in some balconies, a "technical floor" over the roof, and high-tech equipment to record and broadcast performances. With computerized cameras, the auditorium can also be used for live or recorded televised performances. Stage facilities are modern, allowing quick scene changes and the simultaneous use of four different sets.

A new foyer was built under the main auditorium for the main bar and restaurant and for concerts, small-format performances, lectures, cultural activities, and meetings. The Liceu station of the Barcelona Metro line 3 is adjacent to the theater.

== Artistic history ==
=== Performed works ===
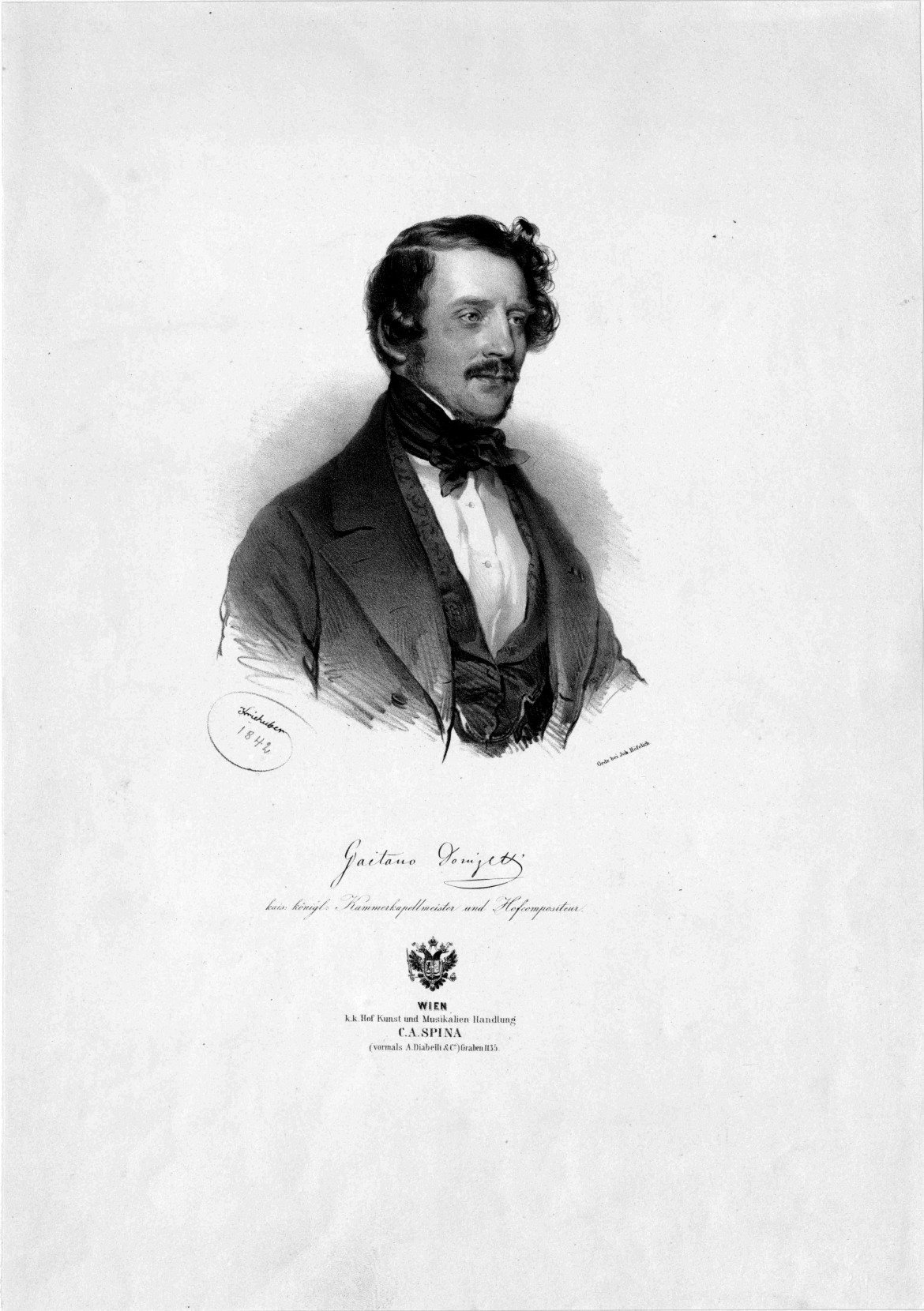
Gaetano Donizetti, composer of Anna Bolena, the first opera performed at the Liceu

The Liceu is a receiving and producing house, with two or three new productions staged each year. Its company consists of a permanent orchestra and choir and singers for supporting roles. Leading roles are usually sung by guest singers. Stagecraft is produced internally by the theater (alone or with other opera houses) and rented from other houses. Until the 1990s, the Liceu also had a ballet company. Most of the operas performed are from 19th-century Italy and Germany: Verdi, Wagner, bel canto composers and, more recently, Puccini, Richard Strauss and Mozart.

The history of Liceu premieres illustrates the evolution of European operatic tastes. Opera was only a part of its artistic activities at first, alternating with zarzuela (Spanish light opera), romantic ballet (Giselle had its first Barcelona performance in 1847), theatrical performances, and magic shows.

The first operas performed, Donizetti's Anna Bolena and Verdi's I due Foscari, are emblematic of the taste for bel canto and Italian romantic melodrama: Rossini, Donizetti, Bellini, and Verdi. They are still in the repertory, and Verdi is the most-performed composer.

The first operas by non-Italian composers which were put on at the Liceu were Ferdinand Hérold's Zampa (1848), Carl Maria von Weber's Der Freischütz (1849), Giacomo Meyerbeer's Robert le diable, Auber's La muette de Portici (1852) and Fra Diavolo (1853). These were sung in Italian, the custom at the time.

The first performances of Il trovatore (1854) and La traviata (1855) led to the crowning of Giuseppe Verdi as the king of opera. In 1866, Mozart's Don Giovanni was staged at the Liceu for the first time.

In 1883, Wagner's Lohengrin was first performed. From the 1880s to the 1950s, Wagner was one of the most beloved and highly regarded composers at the Liceu. It staged the first performance of Parsifal outside Bayreuth on 31 December 1913, after the Bayreuth monopoly ended, with Francesc Viñas in the title role and conducted by Franz Beidler. In 1955, the Bayreuth Festival company visited the theater and performed three operas.

Verismo, especially Puccini, is a late-19th-century tradition. The first Russian opera was staged in 1915 with great success, and Mussorgsky, Rimsky-Korsakov and Tchaikovsky were often performed.

Early in the 20th century, Richard Strauss conducted his works. Siegfried Wagner conducted a concert in 1904, followed a year later by Pietro Mascagni.

In 1915, impresario Mestres Calvet broadened the repertory and introduced composers such as de Falla and Stravinsky. It was a golden age for Russian and German operas, which were now sung in their original language. Mestres also was associated, beginning in 1917, with the success of Diaghilev's ballets with Vaslav Nijinsky, Léonide Massine, Lydia Lopokova, Chernicheva and other dancers. Years later, Anna Pavlova also performed at the Liceu.

In 1947, the directing company came into the hands of Arquer and Pàmias. In contrast with the preceding years, which had been marked by programming of the great repertory works, the first season of the new directorship renewed the repertoire with the first performances in Barcelona of about 100 works by a number of composers. Revivals featured Donizetti's Anna Bolena, which had first been staged at the Liceu one hundred years earlier. For 33 years, Pàmias led Liceu activity when it seemed impossible to maintain the opera house without official aid.

The Liceu's repertory has included the world's most-performed titles since the 1950s, including nearly all the great 20th-century composers (Bartók, Honegger, Gershwin, Berg, Janáček, Weill, Shostakovich, Prokofiev, Britten, Schönberg, and Hindemith) and the baroque and classical composers Monteverdi, Handel and Gluck. Ballet remains an important part of the theater's activities, with performances by some of the world's best-known companies (including the Béjart Ballet).

==== Most-performed operas ====
The Liceu's most-performed operas by January 2009 were:

- Verdi's Aida, with 442 performances from 1877 to 2008
- Verdi's Rigoletto, with 359 performances from 1853 to 2005
- Gounod's Faust, with 297 performances from 1864 to 1988
- Donizetti's Lucia di Lammermoor, with 274 performances from 1849 to 2007
- Donizetti's La favorita, with 263 performances from 1850 to 2002 (the last 10 performances were the French version)
- Verdi's Il trovatore, with 259 performances from 1854 to 1993
- Wagner's Lohengrin, with 241 performances from 1883 to 2006
- Puccini's La bohème, with 238 performances from 1898 to 2001
- Rossini's Il barbiere di Siviglia, with 233 performances from 1847 to 1991
- Verdi's La traviata, with 231 performances from 1855 to 2002
- Meyerbeer's Les Huguenots, with 228 performances from 1856 to 1971 (mostly the Italian version)
- Bizet's Carmen, with 205 performances from 1888 to 1993
- Boito's Mefistofele, with 195 performances from 1880 to 1988
- Meyerbeer's L'Africaine, with 191 performances from 1866 to 1977 (mostly the Italian version)
- Wagner's Die Walküre, with 182 performances from 1899 to 2008

==== Premieres ====
The Liceu has premiered a number of theatrical and musical works, including:

- 1847 (4 April): Ventura de la Vega's history play Don Fernando de Antequera
- 1851 (June): El granuja, a zarzuela with music by N. Gardyn
- 1853 (8 January): Temistocle Solera's Spanish opera La hermana de Pelayo; La tapada del retiro, Nicolau Manent's zarzuela; Sueño y realidad, a zarzuela with music by Felipe Pedrell
- 1854 (16 February): J. Freixas' opera, La figlia del deserto
- 1857 (23 May): Nicolau Manent's opera, Gualtero di Monsonís
- 1858 Pujadas' Catalan zarzuela Setze jutges (Sixteen judges), the first Catalan-language play performed at the Liceu
- 1858 Juan Garín, o, Las peñas de Montserrat, with music by Mariano Soriano Fuertes, Nicolau Manent and Francisco Porcell
- 1859 (12 May): Nicolau Guanyabéns' opera, Arnaldo d'Erill
- 1859 Josep Anselm Clavé's Catalan zarzuela L'aplec del Remei
- 1867 (23 March): Francesc Sánchez Gavagnach's opera Rahabba.
- 1874 (28 January): Marià Obiols' opera, Editta di Belcourt
- 1874 (14 April): Felipe Pedrell's opera, L'ultimo Abenzerraggio
- 1878 (27 November): Salvatore Auteri-Manzocchi's opera, Il negriero
- 1885 (6 June): Manuel Giró's opera, Il rinnegato Alonso García
- 1885 (12 June): Antoni Baratta's opera Lo desengany, the first Catalan-language opera performed at the Liceu
- 1889 (10 July): Francesc Sánchez Gavagnach's opera, La messagiera
- 1892 (14 May): Tomás Bretón's opera, Garín
- 1895 (8 May): Isaac Albéniz's opera, Henry Clifford
- 1896 (5 January): Isaac Albéniz's opera, Pepita Jiménez
- 1902 (4 January): Felipe Pedrell's grand opera, Els Pirineus
- 1903 (3 December): Joan Manén's opera, Acté
- 1906 (20 January): Enric Morera's opera, Empòrium
- 1906 (21 April): Enric Morera's opera, Bruniselda
- 1907 (21 January): Joan Lamote de Grignon's opera, Hesperia
- 1912 (17 January): Enric Morera's Titaina, with libretto by Àngel Guimerà
- 1913 (15 January): Jaume Pahissa's first opera Gal·la Placídia.
- 1913 Jesús Guridi's opera, Mirentxu (premiered as a zarzuela in 1910 in Bilbao, and revised as an opera by the author)
- 1916 (18 January): Enric Morera's opera, Tassarba
- 1919 (15 February): Jaume Pahissa's opera, La morisca
- 1920 (24 January): Joaquim Cassadó's Lo monjo negre
- 1923 (31 March): Jaume Pahissa's Marianela
- 1924 (20 December): A. Marqués' opera, Sor Beatriu
- 1927 (12 January): Facundo de la Viña's opera, La espigadora
- 1928 (28 February): Jaume Pahissa's La princesa Margarida
- 1929 (12 February): Ricard Lamote de Grignon's ballet, Somnis
- 1929 (14 December): Jose Maria Usandizaga's opera, Las golondrinas (premiered as a zarzuela in 1914, and revised as an opera by Ramón Usandizaga)
- 1932 (3 March): Joan Manén's opera, Neró i Acté
- 1935 (15 January): Joan Gaig's opera, El estudiante de Salamanca
- 1938 Salvador Bacarisse's ballet, Corrida de feria
- 1948 (10 January): Xavier Montsalvatge's children's opera, El gato con botas
- 1948 (10 January): Carlos Surinach's opera, El mozo que casó con mujer brava
- 1950 (14 December): Conrado del Campo's opera, Lola la Piconera
- 1952 (12 December): Joan Manén's opera Soledad, and his ballet Rosario la Tirana
- 1953 (21 May): Antoni Massana's Canigó, the first Catalan-language opera after the Spanish Civil War
- 1955 (17 December): Ángel Barrios' opera, La Lola se va a los puertos
- 1955 (19 December): Joaquín Rodrigo's ballet, Pavana real
- 1956 (28 April): Frederic Mompou and Xavier Montsalvatge's ballet, Perlimplinada
- 1959 (1 January): Joan Altisent's opera, Amunt!
- 1960 (17 November): Ricard Lamote de Grignon's opera, La cabeza del dragón (written in 1939)
- 1960 (1 May): Cristóbal Halffter's ballet Jugando al toro, and Matilde Salvador's ballet El segoviano esquivo
- 1961 (24 November): Manuel de Falla and Ernesto Halffter's scenic cantata, Atlàntida
- 1962 (11 December): Xavier Montsalvatge's opera, Una voce in off
- 1969 (1 February): Joan Guinjoan's ballet, Els cinc continents
- 1974 (19 January): Matilde Salvador's opera, Vinatea
- 1975 (29 November): J. Ventura Tort's opera, Rondalla d'esparvers
- 1986 (22 May): Josep Soler's opera, Oedipus et Iocasta (premiered as an oratorio at the Palau de la Música Catalana, 1972)
- 1988 (21 September): Xavier Benguerel's scenic cantata Llibre vermell.
- 1989 (24 September): Leonardo Balada's opera, Cristóbal Colón
- 2000 (2 October): José Luis Turina's opera, D.Q., Don Quijote en Barcelona, with sets by La Fura dels Baus
- 2004 (3 November): Joan Guinjoan's opera, Gaudí
- 2006 (6 April): Josep Mestres Quadreny's camera opera, El ganxo
- 2009 (20 April): Enric Palomar's opera, La cabeza del Bautista

===== Spanish operatic premieres =====
- 1847: Giuseppe Verdi's Giovanna d'Arco (1845)
- 1848: Saverio Mercadante's Orazi e Curiazi (1846)
- 1849: Carl Maria von Weber's Der Freischütz(1821), Giuseppe Verdi's Alzira (1847), and Gaetano Donizetti's Les martyrs (1840, in Italian)
- 1853: Daniel-François Auber's Fra Diavolo (1830)
- 1854: Giuseppe Verdi's Il trovatore (1853)
- 1856: Giuseppe Verdi's Les vepres siciliennes (1855, 1856), in Italian; Giacomo Meyerbeer's Les huguenots (in Italian) (1836)
- 1861: Giuseppe Verdi's Un ballo in maschera (1859)
- 1862: Giuseppe Verdi's Simon Boccanegra (1857)
- 1863: Giacomo Meyerbeer's Le prophète (in Italian) (1849)
- 1864: Charles Gounod's Faust (1859)
- 1868: Giacomo Meyerbeer's Dinorah (in Italian) (1859)
- 1870: Giuseppe Verdi's Don Carlos (1868, Italian version 1869)
- 1875: Giuseppe Verdi's Requiem (1874) and Ambroise Thomas's Mignon (1866)
- 1876: Carlos Gomes' Il guarany (1870)
- 1880: Arrigo Boito's Mefistofele (1868, revised 1875)
- 1883: Amilcare Ponchielli's La Gioconda (1876)
- 1885: Richard Wagner's Die fliegende Höllander (1843)
- 1887: Richard Wagner's Tannhäuser (1845, 1861)
- 1891: Pietro Mascagni's Cavalleria rusticana (1890)
- 1894: Pietro Mascagni's L'amico Fritz (1891) and Jules Massenet's Manon (1884)
- 1897: Camille Saint-Saëns's Samson et Dalila (1877)
- 1898: Giacomo Puccini's La bohème (1896) and Umberto Giordano's Andrea Chénier (1896)
- 1899: Richard Wagner's Tristan und Isolde (1865) and Jules Massenet's Werther (1892)
- 1900: Umberto Giordano's Fedora(1898), Pietro Mascagni's Iris (1898), Richard Wagner's Siegfried (1876), and Christoph Willibald Gluck's Iphigénie en Tauride (1779)
- 1901: Richard Wagner's Götterdammerung(1876) and Engelbert Humperdinck's Hänsel und Gretel (1893)
- 1903: Francesco Cilea's Adriana Lecouvreur (1902)
- 1904: Gustave Charpentier's Louise (1900)
- 1905: Jules Massenet's Thaïs (1894) and Richard Wagner's Die Meistersinger von Nürnberg (1868)
- 1907: Pietro Mascagni's Amica (1905)
- 1908: Camille Saint-Saëns's Les barbares(1901)
- 1910: Richard Strauss' Salome (1905) and Eugen d'Albert's Tiefland (1903) (sung in Catalan)
- 1911: Claude Debussy's L'enfant prodigue (1884)
- 1913: Richard Wagner's Parsifal (1883)
- 1915: Giacomo Puccini's La fanciulla del West (1914) and Modest Mussorgsky's Boris Godunov (1869)
- 1916: Ermanno Wolf-Ferrari's Il segreto di Susanna (1909) and Wolfgang Amadeus Mozart's Le nozze di Figaro (1786)
- 1919: Jules Massenet's Le jongleur de Notre-Dame (1902) and Pietro Mascagni's Guglielmo Rattcliff (1895)
- 1920: Pietro Mascagni's Isabeau (1911)
- 1921: Richard Strauss' Rosenkavalier (1911) and Vincent d'Indy's L'étranger (1901)
- 1922: Nikolai Rimsky-Korsakov's Schneguroschka (1885), Alexander Borodin's Prince Igor (1890), Pyotr Ilyich Tchaikovsky Pikovaia dama (1890)
- 1923: Modest Mussorgsky's Khovanshchina (1886; first Western performance 1913)
- 1924: Antonín Dvořák's Rusalka (1900), Bedřich Smetana's Prodaná nevesta (The Bartered Bride, 1866), Jacques Offenbach's Les contes d'Hoffmann (1881), and Jules Massenet's Hérodiade (1881)
- 1925: Umberto Giordano's La cena delle beffe (1924), Richard Strauss' Intermezzo (1924), and Mozart's Die Zauberflöte(1791)
- 1926: Riccardo Zandonai's Francesca da Rimini (1914), Rimsky-Korsakov's The Legend of the Invisible City of Kitezh (1907, first performance outside Russia), Pskovityanka (1873, 1892), and May Night (1879)
- 1927: Zoltán Kodály's Háry János suite (orchestral suite from opera Háry János)
- 1928: Igor Stravinsky's ballet La sacre du printemps (1913), Giacomo Puccini's Turandot (1926), Mozart's Die Entfuhrung aus dem Serail (1782)
- 1929: Massenet's Don Quichotte (1910)
- 1930: Italo Montemezzi's L'amore dei tre re (1913)
- 1933: Stravinsky's Oedipus rex (1927)
- 1936: Antonín Dvořák's Jakobin (1897, revised)
- 1939: Enric Granados's Goyescas (1916)
- 1943: Richard Strauss' Ariadne auf Naxos (1912)
- 1948: Giacomo Puccini's Il trittico (1918), Ottorino Respighi's La fiamma (1934), and Stravinsky's Le rossignol (1914)
- 1949: Richard Strauss' Elektra (1909) and Édouard Lalo's Le roi d'Ys (1888)
- 1951: Strauss' Die Frau ohne Schätten (1918)
- 1952: Gian Carlo Menotti's The Consul (1950)
- 1953: Riccardo Zandonai's I cavalieri di Ekebù (1925)
- 1954: Menotti's Amelia al ballo (1937), Béla Bartók's Duke Bluebeard's Castle (1919), and Puccini's La rondine (1920, 1924)
- 1955: Ildebrando Pizzetti's Debora e Jaele(1921), George Gershwin's Porgy and Bess(1935), and Pyotr Ilyich Tchaikovsky's Eugene Onegin (1879)
- 1956: Henry Purcell's Dido and Aeneas (1689)
- 1957: Respighi's Maria Egiziaca (1932) and Menotti's The Saint of Bleecker Street (1955)
- 1958: Ildebrando Pizzetti's Assassinio nella catedrale (1958) and Carl Orff's Die Kluge (1943)
- 1959: Francis Poulenc's Dialogues des Carmelites(1959) and Franco Alfano's Cyrano de Bergerac (1936)
- 1962: Strauss' Arabella (1932)
- 1963: Mozart's La clemenza di Tito (1791)
- 1964: Alban Berg's Wozzeck (1925) and Georg Friedrich Handel's Giulio Cesare (1724)
- 1965: Dmitri Shostakovich's Katerina Izmailova (1956) and Leoš Janáček's Jenůfa (1904)
- 1966: José Pablo Moncayo's La mulata de Córdoba (1948), Luis Sandi's Carlota, Salvador Moreno's Severino, Alfredo Keil's A serrana (1899), Francis Poulenc's La voix humaine (1959), Henri Busser's La carrosse du Saint-Sacrement, and Ruggero Leoncavallo's La bohème (1896)
- 1969: Igor Stravinsky's The Rake's Progress (1962), Alban Berg's Lulu (1938), and Mikhail Glinka's One life for the Tsar
- 1971: Kurt Weill's Mahagonny
- 1972: Bohuslav Martinu's A Greek Passion and Smetana's Dalibor
- 1973: Leoš Janáček's Katia Kabanova and Gaetano Donizetti's Caterina Cornaro
- 1975: Benjamin Britten's Billy Budd (1941), Nino Rota's Il cappello di paglia di Firenze, Gian Francesco Malipiero's Il capitano Spavento, and Stravinsky's Mavra
- 1976: Janáček's From the Dead House
- 1977: Sergei Prokofiev's War and Peace, Hector Berlioz's Benvenuto Cellini, and Luigi Cherubini's Medea
- 1985: Arnold Schoenberg's Moses und Aaron
- 1987: Alban Berg's Lulu (Friedrich Cerha's completed version, 1979) and Mozart's Lucio Silla
- 1991: Strauss' Capriccio (1942)
- 1992: Philip Glass' Einstein on the Beach (1976) and János Vajda's Mario and the magician
- 1994: Paul Hindemith's Mathis der Maler (1938)
- 1999: Janáček's Vec Makropoulos
- 2000: Ermanno Wolf-Ferrari's Sly
- 2001: Britten's Gloriana
- 2002: Dmitri Shostakovich's Lady Macbeth de Mtsenk (original 1934 version) and Gaetano Donizetti's La favorite (1850 French version)
- 2003: Philippe Boesmans' Wintermärchen (1999)
- 2004: Jules Massenet's Cléopâtre (1914)
- 2005: Britten's A Midsummer Night's Dream (1960), Giuseppe Verdi's Il corsaro (1848), and Gioacchino Rossini's La gazzetta (1816)
- 2006: Erich Wolfgang Korngold's Die tote Stadt and Handel's Ariodante (1735)
- 2007: Hans Werner Henze's Boulevard Solitude(1952); Jules Massenet's Le portrait de Manon (1894); Giuseppe Verdi's Don Carlos French original version (1868).
- 2008: Britten's Death in Venice and L'ape musicale (a 1789 pasticcio by Lorenzo da Ponte with music by Mozart, Vicente Martín y Soler, Giuseppe Gazzaniga, Domenico Cimarosa, Giordani and Tarchi)
- 2009: Karol Szymanowski's Król Roger (1926) and Héctor Parra's Hypermusic prologue (2009)
- 2010: George Benjamin's Into the little hill (2006)
- 2011: Agustí Charles' Lord Byron: un estiu sense estiu (2011) and György Ligeti's Le Grand Macabre (1978)
- 2013: Kurt Weill's Street Scene (1946)

==== Stage directors and stagecraft ====
During the second half of the 19th century, a school of stagecraft and theatrical scenery was developed at the Liceu. After beginning with Joan Ballester, who was known for his sets for L'Africaine, the leading set designer was Francesc Soler i Rovirosa. The style was realistic, using painted paper flats and curtains. Sets and costumes were made in the theater workshops. From the 1900s to the 1930s, the school was represented by scenery painters who included Maurici Vilomara, Fèlix Urgellés, Salvador Alarma and Oleguer Junyent. The last of these painters was Josep Mestres Cabanes, who painted scenery from 1930 to the 1950s.

==== Singers ====
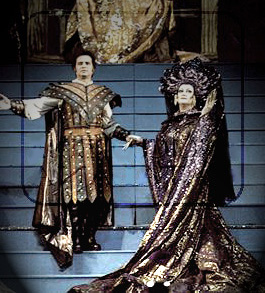
Turandot (1980), with Montserrat Caballé and Pedro Lavirgen

Many notable singers have performed at the Liceu; when Camille Saint-Saëns visited the Liceu, he said: "Ils aiment trop the ténor" ("They [the Liceu public] love tenors too much"). Liceu debuts and final (or most recent) performances are in parentheses:

- 1800s: Manuela Rossi-Caccia (1847), Pietro Mongini (1860/1862), Giuseppe Mario (1863), Roberto Stagno (1867), Rosa Vercolini, Francesco Tamagno (1876/1890), Adelaida d'Alberti, Francesc Mateu (Francesco Uetam) (1874/1877), Carolina Cepeda (1877), Angelo Masini (1881), Julián Gayarre (1881/1888), Victor Maurel, Francesc Viñas (1888/1913), Hariclea Darclée (1894), Luisa Tetrazzini (1896), Geneviève Vix, Josefina Huguet (1896), Maria Barrientos (1898/1918), and Rosina Storchio (1898)
- 1900s: In 1904, Enrico Caruso (in his only Liceu appearance) participated in two performances of Rigoletto. Gemma Bellincioni played the title role in Salomé, where Catalan singer Conchita Supervía made her debut. Other performers included Mario Sammarco (1902), Adamo Didur (1905), Mattia Battistini (1906), Graziella Pareto (1906/1928), Giuseppe Anselmi (1907), Titta Ruffo (1908/1926), and Riccardo Stracciari (1909/1939).
- 1910s–1920s: Elvira de Hidalgo (1911), Ebe Stignani, Conchita Supervía (1912/1928), Hipólito Lázaro (1914/1945), Giovanni Zenatello, Giacomo Lauri-Volpi (1922/1945 and 1972) Miguel Fleta (1925/1933), Toti Dal Monte (1925/1934), Feodor Chaliapin (1927/1934), Lauritz Melchior (1927/1930), Tina Poli Randaccio, Lily Hafgren, Carlo Galeffi, Gilda Dalla Rizza, Georges Thill, Giannina Arangi Lombardi and Gina Cigna
- 1940s: Giulietta Simionato (1945/1951), Victoria de los Ángeles (1945/1968, 1994), Giuseppe Di Stefano (1946/1970, 1986), Maria Caniglia (1947/1954), Gianni Poggi (1947/1963), Kirsten Flagstad (1949/1952), Hans Hotter (1948/1987), and Max Lorenz (1950/1954)
- 1950s: Boris Christoff (1951/1952), Renata Tebaldi (1953/1959), Giuseppe Taddei (1953/1986), Wolfgang Windgassen (1954/1959), Walter Berry (1954/1985), Anton Dermota (1955/1966), Gianna D'Angelo (1957/1965), Enriqueta Tarrés (1957/1992), Fedora Barbieri, Margherita Carosio, Astrid Varnay (1955/1957), Gertrude Grob-Prandl, Birgit Nilsson (1957/1958), Régine Crespin (1958/1966), Carlo Bergonzi (1958/1982), and Alfredo Kraus (1958/1994)
- 1960s: Joan Sutherland (1960/1989), Piero Cappuccilli (1961/1994), Fiorenza Cossotto (1961/1994), Montserrat Caballé (1962/2007), Virginia Zeani (1963/1977), Pedro Lavirgen (1964/1989), Plácido Domingo (1966/2015), Jaume Aragall (1964–1997), Vicente Sardinero (1964/1997), Richard Tucker (1965/1975), Grace Bumbry (1966/1988), and Anja Silja (1966/2000)
- 1970s: Mirella Freni (1970/1994), José Carreras (1958 as a child, and 1970/2008), Joan Pons (1970/2006), Elena Obraztsova (1970/1984), Agnes Baltsa (1971/1992), and Edita Gruberová (1977/2008)
- 1980s: Simon Estes (1981/1997), Matti Salminen (1981/2004), Ewa Podleś (1981/2007), Martti Talvela (1982/1989), Franco Bonisolli Éva Marton (1982/2006), Gwyneth Jones (1985/1997), Nicolai Ghiaurov (1985/1992), Rockwell Blake (1986/1996), and Dolora Zajick (1988/2008)
- 1990s and 2000s: Josep Bros (1992/2007), Deborah Polaski (2000), Angela Denoke (2002), Natalie Dessay, Juan Diego Flórez (2002/2008), Rolando Villazón (2005/2008), Peter Seiffert, Fiorenza Cedolins (2005/2007), and Nina Stemme (2004–2005/2008–2009)

== Company ==
The Liceu has a theater manager (an empresari or administrador). Since 1980, it has also had an artistic director.

=== Managers ===
- Albert Bernis (1901–1911)
- Francesc Casanovas (1911–1913)
- Alfredo Volpini (1913–1914)
- Joan Mestres i Calvet (1915–1947)
- Josep F. Arquer (until 1959) and Joan Pàmias (1947–1980)
- Lluís Portabella (1981–1986)
- Josep M. Busquets (1986–1992)
- Jordi Maluquer (1992–1993)
- Josep Caminal (1993–2005)
- Rosa Cullell (2005–2008)
- Joan Francesc Marco (2008–2013)
- Roger Guasch (2013–2018)
- Valentí Oviedo (2018–present)

=== Artistic directors ===
- Napoleone Annovazzi (1947–1952)
- Lluís Andreu (1981–1990)
- Albin Hänseroth (1990–1996)
- Joan Matabosch (1996–2014)
- Christina Scheppelmann (2014–2019)
- Víctor Garcia de Gomar (2019–present)

=== Orchestra and conductors ===
The Liceu has had its own orchestra, the Orquestra Simfònica del Gran Teatre del Liceu, since it was founded in 1847. In 2024, it was Spain's oldest working orchestra in Spain. Its first conductor was Marià Obiols.

==== Music directors and principal conductors ====
- Ernest Xancó (1959–1961)
- Eugenio Marco (1981–1984)
- Uwe Mund (1987–1994)
- Bertrand de Billy (1999–2004)
- Sebastian Weigle (2004–2008)
- Michael Boder (2008–2012)
- Josep Pons (2012–2026)
- Jonathan Nott (2026–present)

Pons now has the title of honorary music director (director musical honorari) with the company.

=== Choir conductors ===
The choir was consolidated during the 1960s by its, conductor Riccardo Bottino (1960–1982). Since 1982, the choir conductors have been Romano Gandolfi (1982–1993) with Vittorio Sicuri (1982–1990) and Andrés Máspero (since 1990). The present choir conductor is William Spaulding.

== Conservatori de Música del Liceu ==
The Conservatori Superior de Música del Liceu, a music college founded in 1837, is linked to the theater.

== Círculo del Liceo ==
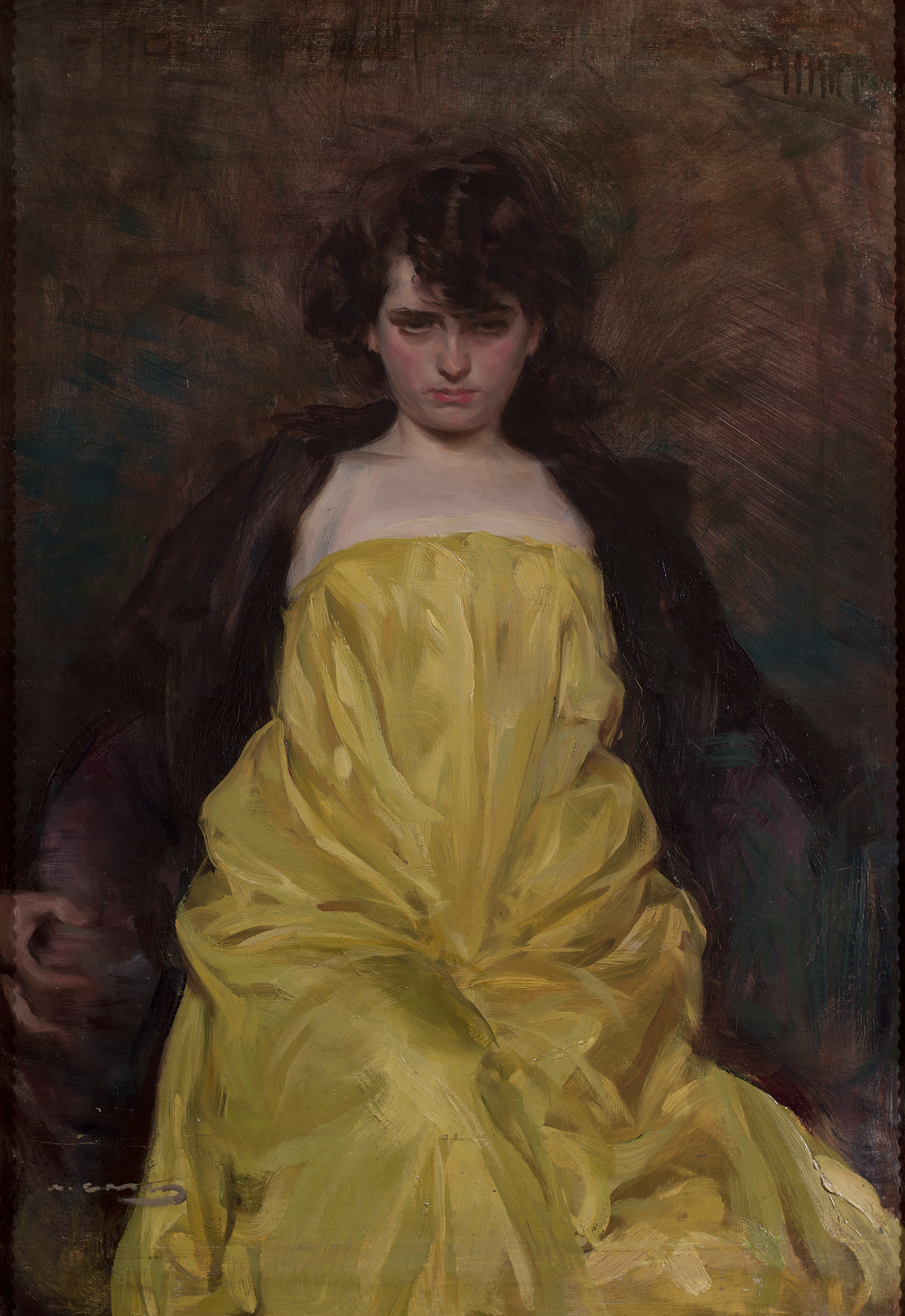
La Sargantain, Júlia Peraire's portrait (1907) by Ramon Casas, is in the Círculo del Liceo

The Círculo del Liceo is a private club in the Liceu building. The "Círculo" opened in November 1847 with 125 founding members, according to its earliest records. The club has lounges, conference rooms, a restaurant, a library and other amenities.

For its first 150 years, only men could join; women were allowed access as guests of male members. In 2001, after controversy about the club's exclusively-male membership, its constitution was amended and ten women (including Montserrat Caballé and relatives of existing members) were permitted to apply for membership. All ten were turned down, but were admitted after a subsequent vote by members (373 votes in favor and 279 against). The club has about one thousand members.

The Círculo del Liceo is Spain's oldest club still at its original location. The club has accumulated a number of artistic works, and many of its rooms are decorated in Art Nouveau style. Four large windows in the low foyer attest the influence of Wagnerism in Catalan culture at the beginning of the 20th century.

In addition to its furniture and decor, the club has a collection of sculptures, marquetry, enamels, engravings, etchings and paintings by Catalan artists who include Alexandre de Riquer, Santiago Rusiñol, Modest Urgell Inglada and Francesc Miralles. The club's most notable art is a set of twelve oils on fabric, commissioned to Ramon Casas and installed in its rotunda. Each of the twelve paintings, Casas' most ambitious work, is inspired by a musical subject.

== In literature and film ==
=== Literature ===
- Frederic Soler's satirical comedy "Liceístas" i "cruzados" (1865), about the 19th-century rivalry between fans of the Liceu and fans of the Teatre Principal (Barcelona's two main opera houses)
- Narcís Oller's novel, La febre d'or (1892)
- Artur Masriera's sketchbook Los buenos barceloneses: hombres, costumbres y anécdotas de la Barcelona ochocentista (1850–1870) (1925)
- Ignacio Agustí's novels Mariona Rebull (1944) and El viudo Rius (1945), about the theater's 1893 bombing
- Eduardo Mendoza's novel La ciudad de los prodigios (1986). The film based on it was filmed at the Teatre Fortuny in Reus.
- Joan Agut's short-story collection, El dia que es va cremar el Liceu (The Day the Liceu Was Burnt, 1995)

=== Films ===
- Mariona Rebull (1947), directed by José Luis Sáenz de Heredia
- Gayarre (1958), by Domingo Viladomat, a biopic about Julián Gayarre (Alfredo Kraus)
- Circus World (1964), directed by Henry Hathaway, with John Wayne and Claudia Cardinale. Some circus scenes were filmed inside the theater.
- Romanza final (1986), directed by José María Forqué, a film about Julián Gayarre's life with Josep Carreras.
- Un submarí a les estovalles (1990), directed by Ignasi Pere Ferré
- La febre d'or (1993), directed by Gonzalo Herralde, with Fernando Guillén, Rosa M. Sardà and Àlex Casanovas, with excerpts of a performance of Gounod's Faust
- The Life of David Gale (2003), directed by Alan Parker, with Kevin Spacey and Kate Winslet

== See also ==
- Conservatori Superior de Música del Liceu
- List of theaters and concert halls in Barcelona
- Orquestra Simfònica del Gran Teatre del Liceu
