= Pedrell =

Pedrell is a surname. Notable people with the surname include:

- Carlos Pedrell (1878–1941), Uruguayan composer, guitarist, and educator
- Felip Pedrell (1841–1922), Catalan composer, guitarist, and musicologist
