= Ignasi de Solà-Morales =

Catalan architect and writer

Ignasi de Solà-Morales Rubió (Barcelona 1942 - Amsterdam 2001) was an architect, historian and philosopher from Catalonia, Spain.

He was professor of composition at the Barcelona School of Architecture, and also taught at the universities of Princeton, Columbia, Turin, and Cambridge.

Among his most notable architectural works are the reconstruction of Ludwig Mies van der Rohe's Barcelona Pavilion, and the reconstruction and expansion of the Liceu Theatre in Barcelona.

Ignasi de Solà-Morales coined the term "terrain vague", applied to “free, available, unengaged” parts of the city that are, as urban scholar Stefano Bloch puts it, "left over as underutilized remnants of capitalist development."

== Publications ==
- 1975: Rubió i Bellver y la fortuna del Gaudinismo
- 1976: L'arquitectura del expresionismo
- 1976: Centenari de l'Escola d'Arquitectura de Barcelona. Un assaig d'interpretació
- 1980: Eclecticismo y vanguardia
- 1983: Gaudí
- 1984: Arquitectura teatral en España
- 1985: L'Exposició Internacional de Barcelona 1914-1929
- 1986: Arquitectura Minimale a Barcelona
- 1986: Contemporary Spanish Architecture
- 1986: Arquitectura balneària a Catalunya
- 1996: Diferencias: topografía de l'arquitectura contemporánea
