= Pedro Blanco López =

Spanish composer, pianist, teacher and music critic

Pedro Blanco López (León, 14 July 1883 – Porto, 1 May 1919) was a Spanish composer, pianist, teacher and music critic.

== Biography ==
Pedro Blanco López was the son of the musician Mateo Blanco del Río and Emilia López y Moya. He began his musical studies with his father in León. Starting in 1897, he studied at the National School of Music in Madrid with teachers such as Felipe Pedrell and Andrés Monge. With them, as well as with Tomás Bretón, he maintained an important epistolary relationship throughout his life. At the Conservatory of Music and Declamation, as the National School was renamed at the turn of the century, he obtained the First Prize for Piano in 1902.

In Madrid, he began a career as a pianist that took him to Porto, where he lived from 1903 until his death. There he married his student Clementina Nogueira and had two children. Shortly after his arrival in Portugal, he joined a literary and artistic circle in the coastal city of Espinho, which included personalities such as the painter Amadeo de Souza-Cardoso, the poet and pedagogue João de Barros and, above all, Dr Manuel Laranjeira. Through this singular intellectual, he met other characters such as Miguel de Unamuno, with whom he corresponded for several years. His Spanish friends and occasional collaborators included the painter Cecilio Plá, the playwright Guillermo Perrín and the cartoonist Ramón Cilla.

Blanco developed an important career as a piano teacher, with many disciples for more than a decade. In addition, he was chosen as a teacher for the newly opened Porto Conservatory of Music, where he taught from 1917 until his death. Blanco had a relevant contribution to the flourishing cultural life of Porto in the first two decades of the 20th century, in movements such as Renascença portuguesa. A passionate and charismatic artist, he had an undeniable influence on the community that he took advantage of to carry out important social work. In Porto he developed a close friendship with personalities of the stature of the sculptor António Teixeira Lopes, the cartoonist Leal da Câmara and the writer Antero de Figueiredo. Likewise, he maintained a fluid correspondence with personalities from the national and international musical and artistic world.

As a writer, Pedro Blanco wrote many articles for newspapers and magazines, mainly in Spanish and Portuguese languages, focused on various fields: music criticism, regenerationism and the defense of the condition of musicians, and dissemination of artistic activities of the close two nations. He carried out a very important, and until now forgotten, work of cultural exchange between Spain and Portugal, actively contributing to a contemporary cultural Iberianism.

Pedro Blanco died on 1 May 1919, a victim of the influenza virus.

== Selected works ==
Despite his premature death, Blanco was the author of many interesting musical works:

- For piano:
  - Mazurca Triste (Op. 1).
  - Hispania (Op. 4. Also for orchestra by L. Lambert)
  - Heures Romantiques. Impressiones Intimes (Op. 6).
  - Galanías (Op. 10).
  - Dos mazurcas: Del amor y Del dolor (Op. 12).
  - Castilla (Op. 16).
- For voice and piano:
  - ¡Guitarra mía! (Op. 2).
  - Los ojos negros (Op. 3).
  - Canções: “O Senhor Reitor”, “Flor da Rua”, “A Fiandeira” (Op.5).
  - Dos melodías: "Rosa e lírio", Barca-bela (Op. 9).
  - Cantiga e Trovas do longe (Op. 11).
  - Duas melodias para piano e canto: "Madrigal", "Quand même" (Op. 14).
- For piano and violin:
  - Romance y Zambra andaluza (Op. 7).
- For Orchestra:
  - Añoranzas (Op. 8).
  - Duas melodias portuguesas: “Anjo da Guarda”, “Noite de Amores” (Op. 13).
  - Concierto en si menor (piano and orchestra, Op. 15).

== Links ==
- Blog Añoranzas y saudades (News about Pedro Blanco, Spanish)
- Festival de Música Española (CDs, concerts and exhibitions, Spanish)
- Pedro Blanco: A vida e a obra para piano (PhD. Nuno Caçote, Portuguese)
- Free scores by Pedro Blanco López at the International Music Score Library Project (IMSLP)
