= Ana Serrano Redonnet =

Argentine author, composer

Ana Serrano Redonnet (30 December 191? -15 June 1993) was an Argentine author, composer, conductor, guitarist and music critic who promoted Argentine folk music and used its themes in her own compositions. Her birth year is variously given as 1910, 1914, or 1916.

Serrano Redonnet was born in Buenos Aires. She studied guitar with Antonio Sinopoli and composition with Gilardo Gilardi and Jaume Pahissa. In addition to composing, she was the music critic for the Tribuna and Cabildo newspapers. She served as the music advisor at the Argentine Ministry of Foreign Affairs’ Department of Cultural Affairs from 1941 to 1945, and produced a folk music program on the national radio, LRA Radio del Estado, in 1947. She conducted orchestras at Teatro Colón and in the Argentine provinces of Santa Fe and Cordoba. Her music was recorded commercially by LP Ten Records.

Serrano Redonnet's works were published by Ediciones Musicales Argentinas and Ricordi Americana.

Her publications include:

== Ballet ==
- El Niño Alcalde

== Book ==
- Panorama Estetico de la Musica Argentina (Aesthetic Panorama of Argentine Music)

== Theater ==
- La Chaya
- Tierra

== Vocal ==
- Argentine Musical Songbook
- Arreos (voice and guitar)
- Bagualas de Chaya (voice and guitar)
- Canción de Cuna India (music by Gilardo Gilardi; text by Ana Serrano Redonnet)
- Cancion del Guagua
- Coplas Tuyas (voice and guitar)
- Danza (voice and guitar)
- El Maule (voice and guitar)
- Indianas (soprano, flute and drum)
- La Generala (voice and guitar)
- La Soledad (soloist, choir and string orchestra)
- Lamento (voice and guitar)
- Melisma de la Soledad (voice and guitar)
- Quebradenas (voice, flute, oboe, clarinet, bassoon, guitar and folk instruments)
- Seis Aires Argentinos (texts by Bernardo Canal Feijoo, Rafael Jijena Sanchez and Domingo Zerpa)
- Vidala (voice and guitar)
- Yaravi (text by Ruben A. Vela)
- Yo Se Lo que Estoy Cantando (voice and guitar)

- Listen to Seis Aires Argentinos by Ana Serrano Redonnet
