= Elsa Laura Wolzogen =

German composer, lute player and singer

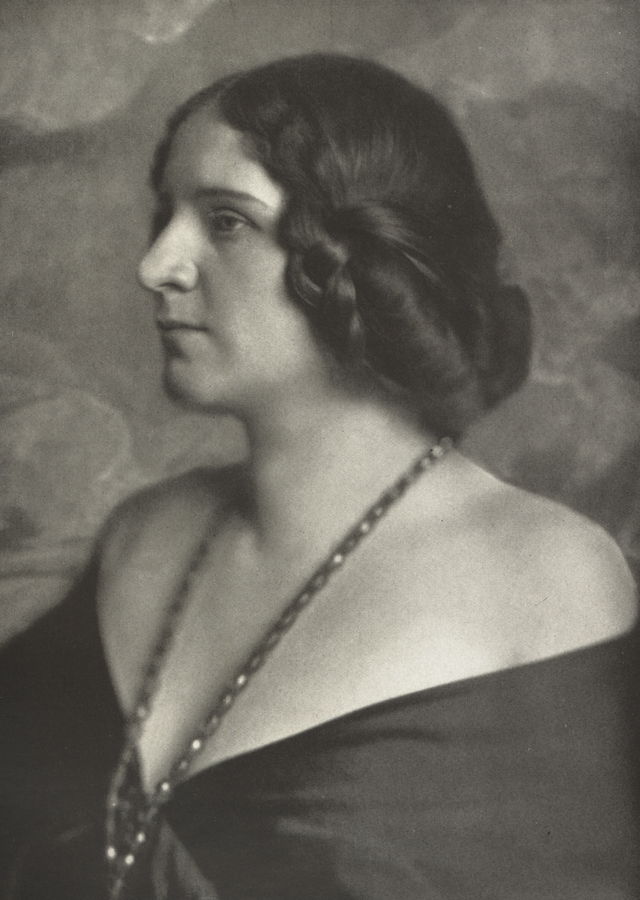
Elsa Laura von Wolzogen by Nicola Perscheid

Elsa Laura Seemann von Mangern von Wolzogen (5 August 1876 – 25 April 1945) was a German composer, lute player, and singer. She was born and grew up in Dresden, where her family owned a guesthouse which entertained well-known artists and scholars like Arthur Rubinstein. Elsa married Ernst von Wolzogen in 1902. Ernst had opened the 650-seat Buntes Theater in Berlin in 1901, one of the first cabarets in Germany. Elsa often sang and accompanied herself on lute at the theater, where Viennese composer Arnold Schoenberg conducted the house orchestra.

Elsa and Ernst toured the United States from 1910 to 1911. An unidentified critic noted in 1911 that "Elsa Laura sings songs in ten different languages and in many dialects. ... she is equally at home in the folk songs of Provence and in the darky songs of America. The French Chanson and the Tyrolian Schnaderhiipfel have no terrors for her."

Elsa composed her own songs and arranged hundreds of French, German and Scandinavian folk songs for voice and lute, which were published by Friedrich Hofmeister Musikverlag in Leipzig. She also set poems by her husband Ernst to music. Her works include:

- Death Rides
- Father Weislein
- Five Songs (words by Ernst and Elsa Wolzogen; music by Juan Manen, opus A-4)
- My Lute and Me (1917)
- My Songs to the Lute (1910)
- Rosemary and Rhombus: Old Lute songs
- Ten Cheerful Little Wise Men (1912)
- Wilhelm Busch Songs
