= Els Pirineus =

Spanish opera

- Based on: Los Pirineos, by Victor Balaguer
- Music by: Felipe Pedrell
- Date premiered: January 4, 1902
- Place premiered: Gran Teatre del Liceu, Barcelona
- Original language: Italian
- Genre: Opera

Els Pirineus (in Spanish: Los Pirineos; in English: The Pyrenees) is an opera in three acts and a prologue with music by Felipe Pedrell and libretto based on the trilogy Els Pirineus (The Pyrenees) by Víctor Balaguer (1892). It premiered, in Italian, on January 4, 1902, at the Gran Teatro del Liceo.

In Spain, musical nationalism appeared during the 19th century as a reaction to German and Italian romanticism, which conditioned European opera. Felipe Pedrell led the efforts to achieve a Spanish opera, a task in which he was seconded by Ruperto Chapí and Tomás Bretón, among others. After the success of the revival of his Italian-language work L'ultimo abenzeraggio (in English: The Last Abencerrage) in 1889, the composer from Tortosa received numerous incentives to return to composing operas. Pedrell intended to reply to Bretón's opera Lovers of Teruel.

The opera was conceived from the beginning as a tragedy that Balaguer wrote in the Casa de Santa Teresa, his residence, next to the current Víctor Balaguer Museum-Library in Villanueva y Geltrú. Pedrell, for his part, began to work on the composition of the opera in 1890, and while he was shaping what would become the first two acts, Balaguer expanded his work on Albigensians, troubadours, and inquisitors with what would become the prologue and third act of the opera. Within months, Pedrell outlined the idea of the trilogy with a prologue, perhaps because of certain affinities with the Wagnerian tetralogy Der Ring des Nibelungen (in English: The Ring of the Nibelung), but with the intention of reforming lyric drama and creating a Hispanic lyric school. The Wagnerian character of the score is not so evident, or at least so exclusive, as one can also trace the influences of the Italian composers of the time as well as the French grand opéra.

== Interpretations ==
Balaguer had to content himself during his lifetime with hearing some fragments of the opera: the prologue composed by Pedrell was presented in Venice in March 1897 (on the 12th, 14th and 17th), and it would not be until a year after his death, in January 1902, when the work would be premiered in its entirety at the Gran Teatro del Liceo in the Italian version, with figurines made by Apel-les Mestres.

The Liceu recovered some fragments in the concert Els hereus de la Renaixença (in English: The Heirs of the Renaissance) of the 1999-2000 season and re-released a complete version on February 17th and 19th of 2003, according to a revision by Edmon Colomer and Francesc Cortés, recovering the archaisms of the original libretto in Catalan, and that counted with Ofelia Sala, Ángeles Blancas, Vicente Ombuena, Marina Rodríguez Cusí, and Stefano Palatchi in the cast.
