= Juan Manén =

Spanish violinist and composer (1883-1971)

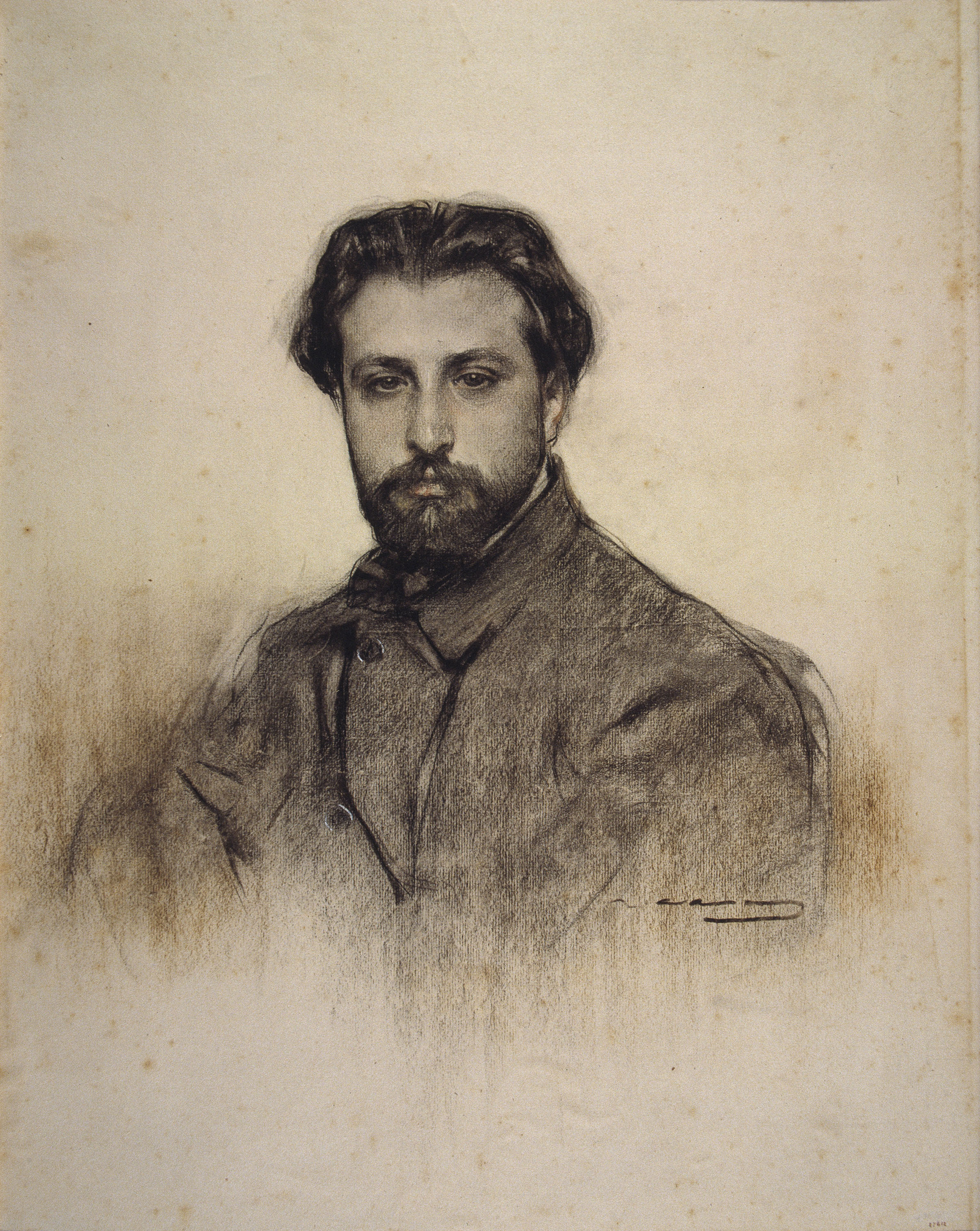
- Manén seen by Ramon Casas (MNAC)
- Born: 14 March 1883; Barcelona, Spain
- Died: 26 June 1971; Barcelona, Spain
- Occupations: Composer, violinist
- Era: 20th-century

Juan Manén (or Joan Manén; 14 March 1883 – 26 June 1971) was a Spanish violinist and composer, born in Barcelona.

As a child, his progress in music was so rapid that his father exhibited him as a piano prodigy. Then, having studied the violin under Clemente Ibarguren, he debuted as a violinist, and met with such success that in Germany he was compared to his famous countryman Sarasate. Likewise he attracted much attention as a composer, not only in Spain, but perhaps to even a greater degree in Germany, where he resided at different times for protracted periods. His works comprise: the operas Giovanni di Napoli (1903), Der Fackeltanz (1909) and Neró i Acté (1928) with his own libretto; the symphonic poem Nova Catalonia; at least three violin concertos; "Fantasia - Sonata" for guitar; a suite for violin and piano; a piano quartet, a string quartet, and a number of exquisite miniatures for violin and orchestra. He also made a completion-cum-arrangement of Beethoven's Violin Concerto in C, which otherwise only survives in its first 259 measures.

== Life ==
Joan Manén was born in Barcelona, Catalonia. Precociously gifted, he learnt solfège and piano with his father from the age of three, and at seven played Chopin concertos in public. Meanwhile, at five, he had begun to study the violin with Vicente Negrevernis. The study of the piano and the violin is kept alike and with little time he develops an unusual facility for sight-reading all kinds of scores. In 1890 his father succeeded in convincing Clemente Ibarguren -formed in Paris- to give violin lessons to his son. They set two classes per week, and he rapidly attained astonishing technical mastery and at the age of nine made his début in Latin America. In the summer of 1892 Juanito's first public presentation takes place at the Nuevo Casino in Castellón, where he is a pianist and violinist in five successful concerts. The programs appear in the pieces "Adiós a la Alhambra" de Jesus de Monasterio, "Air varié" by Charles de Beriot, and "Balade et Polonaise" by Henry Vieuxtemps among others.

A press excerpt shows his success: "Indeed, it does not cease to be surprising in its own years, to see the ease and the ingenuity with which he manages the bow, the tuning and clarity of the sound and the perfection of his articulation, conditions are well directed, over time they will make the artist-child, what the French call a virtuoso " (Mercantil 7-VII-1892, Teatro Pizarro). He made his European début as a violinist in 1898, when he was hailed as a virtuoso of the first rank; he later made five world tours.

Almost entirely self-taught as a composer, Manén had begun to write at 13, and in 1900 he conducted a concert of his own works in Barcelona. It was in 1894 when his father, Joan Manén Abellan, believed that it was not enough that his son triumphed as a virtuoso of the violin and decided to start it in composition. As Joan Manén himself explains in the first volume of "My experiences", his father gave him a blank paper, hoping that he, without knowledge of harmony, would begin to compose some work. The first intents were an absolute failure, but after a while and in an intuitive way, he began to be aware of his talent as a composer. Manén was an involuntary self-taught person because throughout his childhood and adolescence his father, an entertainer, did not allow him to study composition at any conservatory. Looking at the history of music, it is difficult to find in the world of composition such an extraordinary case of self-learning. It must be remembered that his father, the only teacher of his son, was an amateur musician with few musical studies that only played the piano very discreetly. Several teachers offered to give classes of harmony and composition but the father used to say: "He will only learn it from the much music he reads. The instinct when possessed is the best teacher. " The ability to read in sight of the little Joan was extraordinary. He himself tells us that his father gave him many symphonic works and operas so he read them in the piano. In spite of the difficulty they were having, the child came out pretty shamelessly.

His first opera, Juana de Nápoles (produced when he was 19), was well received at the Gran Teatre del Liceu from Barcelona, and he immediately followed this with Acté, for which (as for all his later operas) he wrote his own libretto. He then spent time in Germany, where he acquired an admiration for Wagner and Richard Strauss, which can be observed in his orchestral writing. Strauss's influence on his harmony can also be particularly heard in his songs. He composed prolifically in many genres, but later destroyed, disowned or radically revised everything he had composed before 1907. This led him, for example, almost completely to rewrite Acté - increasing the complexity of the texture - as Neró i Acté.

Manén made numerous arrangements, both instrumental and vocal, of Spanish and Catalan folk melodies, and traditional dance styles (e.g. the Sardana) appear in his works. His music is tonal in idiom and predominantly lyrical, and there are often thematic connections between movements. His writings include many articles in Spanish and French periodicals and a treatise on the violin. In 1927 he became a member of the Spanish Academy of Arts; among many other awards and honours, there has been a plan to name a new concert hall in Barcelona after him.

In 1930 he founded and presided over the Barcelona Philharmonic Society (Societat Filarmònica de Barcelona), an influential entity in the Barcelona musical atmosphere that programmed several concerts. His strong and demanding character and his indolent attitude towards the Franco regime made him, at the same time, loved and hated by the society of the moment; The impositions of the dictatorship prompted him to replace Catalan for a lifetime by the Spanish and to timidly approach the Franco regime in order to maintain his artistic activity throughout the country.

He died in 1971 and was buried in the Cementiri de Montjuïc in Barcelona.

== The composer ==
=== First works ===
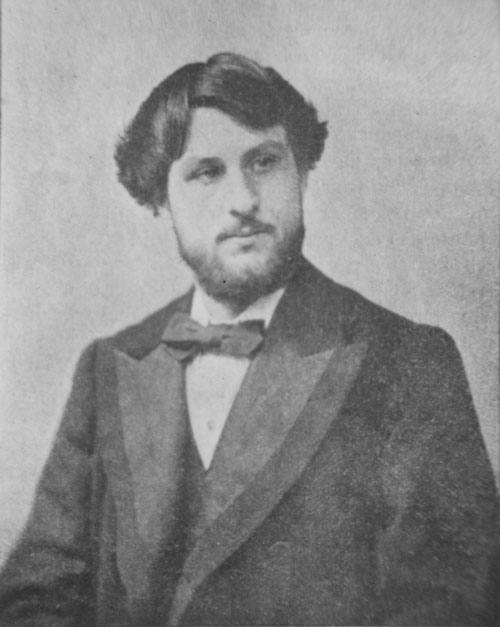

Joan Manén's first works were very simple pieces for violin and piano, lounge music written to be performed at the concerts he himself performed. In this way, the child prodigy could show off in front of the audience as both performer and composer. One of the works that was most successful among the public was a virtuoso transcription made by Manén himself, a Vals-Jota on the famous zarzuela "El Duo de la Africana" by Manuel Fernández Caballero. Among other works, he wrote a small piece titled "Romancita", probably his first work, and one of the first to be published. Little by little his works were increasing in complexity, as in the case of the four Catalan Caprices, and the "Concierto Español" for violin and orchestra Op. A-7. According to Manén, his learning was constant, and every day he was aware he had made mistakes. It is for this reason, as we will see later, that the re-elaboration of his works was a constant throughout the first two decades of the 20th century.

=== Development ===
As for the style and influences of the first works, we can see that in many cases he took Spanish and Catalan popular themes that were reelaborated through a more central European language than Spanish. His fascination with Ludwig van Beethoven, Richard Wagner and later Richard Strauss made him take pleasure in the great forms and from the beginning of the twentieth century he began to tackle works with a Germanic language of poematic and descriptive style very close to what parallel Richard Strauss was cultivating. In a concert in Cologne on January 4, 1900, Strauss himself accompanied him at the piano for several of his works.

As Manén was gaining a greater command of orchestration his music was able to achieve more expressive depth and in operas such as Acté, premiered in 1903 at the Liceu in Barcelona, achieved through a powerful orchestral technique to condense and develop The drama is very effective and poignant. But to get to write an opera of the size of Acté he had to confront the composition of several zarzuelas such as "The Tantalus Infatuation", or "Elixir de amor" works composed during adolescence in difficult times of his career as a violinist. Thanks to the compositional experience of these works as well as the opera "Giovanna di Napoli", premiered at the Liceu in January 1903, he could face what would possibly be his key piece "Acté".

=== Consolidation ===
The opera "Acté", inherited from a traditionally Germanic tradition, premiered at the Liceu in December 1903 and was understood by a Barcelona audience accustomed to the highly Italianized taste in those times. Just after the premiere he declared himself in the Catalan Musical Magazine: "I do not think that in the first performance the audience can follow me in everything I want to express in the score, but I trust that in successive auditions I will allow I get to him, especially his feeling, from which I think that the technique should not be but a transmission vehicle and, the more refined and perfect, the more powerful it will reach the feeling of the audience. " But while Manen was quite misunderstood and in many cases little valued on his land, little by little he was opening doors as a composer in Germany; Acté was represented with great success in Dresden (1908), Cologne (1910) and Leipzig (1913) and thanks to the public recognition that reached the work, his career as a composer acquires a new impulse. It is then when they see the light symphonic works of magnitude such as Nova Catalònia, Juventus and Suite for violin, piano and orchestra. In these first symphonic works we find a clear example of the style and the characteristics that will define the whole of his orchestral work. These are works that combine a highly skilled orchestration and a highly elaborate thematic elaboration, as a result of an assimilation of the Germanic repertoire, with the intuition and spontaneity of an extroverted musician and in many moments of eminently Mediterranean inspiration.

== Works list ==
Compositions by Joan Manén classified by Opus
Title	Instrumentation	Movements	Publisher	Duration
Op A-1 Suite per a violí, piano i orquestra	2.2.2.2- 2.2.3.0-timp., perc.-strings, violin & piano soloist	1. Introduction: Allegro - 2. Scherzo: Allegretto mosso - 3. Catalana: Andante 4. Finale: Allegro energico	Universal Edition	30'
Op A-2 Introducció, Andante i Variacions sobre un tema de Tartini, per a violí i orquestra	2.2.2.2.- 4.2.0.0.- perc., strings, soloist violin	Introducció, Andante i Variacions	Universal Edition	
Op A-3 Petita suite espanyola per a violí i piano	Violin and Piano	1. Rondalla - 2. Marina - 3. Andaluza - 4. Dolora - 5. Moto Perpetuo	Max Eschig	15'
Op A-4 Cinc caninos alemanyes per a ved i piano (based on text by Ernst and Elsa Laura Wolzogen)	Voice and Piano	1. Chopin 2. Mitternacht 3. Rosenbaum 4. Lenz-Tageweis 5. Reife.	Editions Max Eschig / Juan Manén - Grafispania:Madrid / Huntsville, Tex.: Recital Publications (1989)	17'
Op A-4 nº5 "Liebesjubel" per a veu i piano	Voice and Piano		Juan Manén -Grafispania: Madrid	
Op A-5 Juventus. Concerto grosso per a dos violins, piano i orquestra	2 violins, piano & orchestra	I. Commodo- Allegro moderato II. Allegro non troppo III. Adagio IV Allegro	Universal Edition	
Op A-6 Quartet amb piano en fa menor "Mobilis in mobili"	Piano quartet	1. Vigoroso - Allegro moderatto - 2. Allegretto gioccoso - 3. Andante - 4. Allegro ritmico	Vidal & Llimona	31'
Concert per a violí i orquestra (discontinued)		1. Allegro non troppo - 2. Andante sostenuto - 3. Allegro con motto	Universal Edition	
Op A-7 "Concierto español" nº 1 per a violí i orquestra	Violin & orchestra	1. Allegretto ben moderato - 2. Lamento - Adagio ma non troppo - 3. Allegro molto	Universal Edition	31'
Op A-8 Cançó i Estudi per a violí i orquestra de corda / violí i piano	Strings (5. 5. 3. 2. 2.)		Universal Edition / Berlin: Raabe & Plothow 1910 (Op. A-8 nº2)	8'
Op A-9 Tres Cançons franceses per a veu i piano	Voice & Piano		Editions Max Eschig	10'
El Pross (discontinued)		Pròleg- Acté I Primera jornada - Acte II Segona jornada - Acte III Tercera jornada- Epíleg		
Op A-10 Quatre Cançons alemanyes per a veu i piano	Voice & Piano	1-Schimmernder, flimmernder schmetterling 2. Serenade 3. Totenkranz 4.Prinzesschen	Universal Edition / Juan Manén -Grafispania: Madrid (1950) Huntsville, Tex. : Recital Publications (1989)	
Op A-11 Quatre cors Catalans per a veus mixtes i orquestra de cambra / veus mixtes i piano	1.1.1.1-2.0.0.0 - perc.- strings	Papallona i Margarida (13'30'') - Lo Pardal (5') – Els dos camins (6')	Universal Edition (1934-1936) -discontinued	
Ègloga per a cor i orquestra	2.2.2.2-2.2.0.0- timp, perc., harp, strings		manuscript (Arxiu Associació Joan Manén)	14'30
Op A-12 Tres Cançons Ibèriques per a cor de dones i piano	Women Choir & Piano	1. Charmangarria cera (pop.vasca) - 2. Fuíme a la Pola por vino (pop.asturiana)3. Muntanyes regalades (pop.catalana)	Universal Edition	
Op A-13 Concert Simfònic per a piano i orquestra	3.2.2.2.-4.2.3.1.-3 timp.,2 perc.-strings	1. Allegro non troppo - 2. Andante sostenuto - 3. Allegro con motto	Universal Edition (1st version) – Manuscript (2nd version)	36'
Op A-14 Caprici nº 1 en la menor per a violí i orquestra / violí i piano	2.2.2.2. - 2.2.0.0 - perc., strings		Universal Edition	11'30''
Op A-15 Caprici No. 2 en re menor per a violí i orquestra / violí i piano	2. 2. 2. 2 - 2. 2. 0. 0 – perc. - cordes		Universal Edition / Huntsville, Texas: Recital Publications Huntsville (2006)	9'
Op A-16 Quartet per a corda en fa major	String Quartet	I. Matí (Transparencia) – II. Migdia (Exultació) - III. Vespre (Inquietuts)	Universal Edition	30'
Op A-17 Nova Catalònia: Simfonia º1 per a gran orquestra	4. 4 .4. 4. - 6. 4. 4. 1. - percussion, 2 harps, piano, saxophone, strings	1. Terra i Raça 2. Poble i joia 3. La nostre cançó 4. Nova Catalònia	Universal Edition	50'
Op A-18 Quintet per a piano i cordes "Lui et elle" en do menor	Quintet for piano & Strings	1."Lui et elle" Allegro Assai 2. "Caresses" Adagio 3. "Eclat" Allegro	Universal Edition	29'
Op A-19 Der Weg zur Sonne / El Camí del sol	3.3.4.3 - 4.3.3.1- 2 harps, piano (celesta), timpani, 2 percussions, strings	Pròleg- Acté I Primera jornada - Acte II Segona jornada - Acte III Tercera jornada- Epíleg	Universal Edition 1923	
Op A-20 Balada per a violí i piano	Violin & Piano		Universal Edition	11'
Op A-21 Neró i Acté (Opera)	3. 3.3. 3 - 3. 4. 3. 1 - percussion, harp, celesta & strings	Acte I - Acte II - Acte- III - Acte IV	Leipzig: August Cranz 1928/ Karlsruhe : J. Manén, (reduction for voice & piano)	2h. 10'
Op A-22 Fantasia-Sonata per a guitarra	Guitar		Schoot Music – Editorial Berbén	18'
Op A-23 Obertura per a "La vida es sueño"	3.3.3.2 - 4.3.3.1 - timp.-2 perc., strings	Adagio molto, misterioso e pesante-Allegro con fuoco-Doppio più lento	Max Eschig	14'30''
Op A-24 Concerto da camera No. 2 per a violí, orquestra de corda i arpa	Violin, String Orchestra & Harp	1. Presentació i desenvolupament 2. Sardana	Universal Edition	25'
Op A-25 Dansa Ibèrica nº 1 per a violí i piano; Dansa Ibèrica nº 2 per a violí i piano	Violin & Piano		Universal Edition	(n. 1) - 8' (n.2) - 4'
Op A-26 Cançó ibèrica nº1 "Flecha" per a veu i piano; Cançó ibèrica nº 2 "Sardana" per a veu i piano / veu i orquestra	Voice & Piano / Voice & Orchestra		Max Eschig	(n. 1) - 3'30'' (n.2) - 4'
Op A-27 Rosario la tirana, ballet en un acte per an orquestra	3.3.3.3 - 4.3.3.1 - timpani, 2 percussions, celesta, 2 harps, strings (8.8.4.4.4)		Max Eschig	
A-28 Cor nº1: Muntanyes del Canigó; Cor nº2: Caprici sobre el cant popular "El Pardal"	Choir	Cor nº1: Muntanyes del Canigó Cor nº2: Caprici sobre el cant popular "El Pardal"	Madrid, Grafispania (1959)	5'
Op A-29 Quadres, suite per a piano	Piano	1. Entrada rústica 2. Escena en un abanico antiguo 3. Fantasias durante un sueño 4. Fiesta en el pueblo	Max Eschig	25'
Op A-30 Interludi nº1 per a violí i piano	Violin & Piano		Max Eschig	4'30'
Op A-31 Concert per a violoncel i orquestra	2.2.2.2 - 2.2.3.0- timpani, strings	Andante energico e pesante - Allegro con motto - Allegro non tanto	Manuscript	
Op A-32 Divertimento	2.2.2.2. - 2.0.0.0- perc., strings		Schott Music	18'
Op A-33 Caprici català nº3 per a violí i orquestra / violí i piano	2.2.2.2 - 2.2.0.0- timpani, perc.- strings		Los Angeles, Affiliated Musicians (vl & piano version)	10'
Op A-34 Heros; Interludi de l'òpera Heros per an orquestra; Cor nº 5 El petit maridet	3.3.4.3 - 4.3.3.1- 2 harps, piano (celesta), timpani, 2 percussion, strings	Pròleg- Acté I Primera jornada - Acte II Segona jornada - Acte III Tercera jornada- Epíleg	Epoca ideal, 1958 (Madrid: Grafispania)	Interludi: 13' Cor nº 5: 9'
Op A-35 Don Juan; Introducció del segon acte i ball "La tarántula" del tercer de l'òpera "Don Juan", per an orquestra simfònica	3.2(+C.i.).1(+Cl.b.).2(+C-basn.) - 4.3.3.1- harp, celesta, timpani, 2 perc., strings	1ª Part: "Don Juan" - Acte I "El salvamento", Acte II "La violación", Acte III "La quinta de Don Juan" 2ª Part: "El convidado de piedra" - Acte I "Estrella", Acte II "La emboscada", Acte III "La serenata" 3ª Part: "El eterno Don Juan"- Acte I "Orgia y Muerte", Acte II "Inmortalidad", Epíleg "En el espacio sideral"	Manuscript	
Op A-36 Dansa Ibèrica nº3 "Calatayud" per a violí i piano			Max Eschig	7'30''
Op A-37 Concert per a violí i orquestra nº 3 "Ibérico"	2.2.2.2.-2.2.3.0.- timp.- perc. - strings. - soloist violin	1. Allegro energico 2. Enlace: Adagio pesante 3. Finale: Allegro con spirito	Juan Manén, Barcelona	
Op A-38 "El retrat de Dorian Gray" per an orquestra				
Op A-39 Concert per an oboè i orquestra	1.0.2.0. / 2.0.0.0. / harp /strings/ soloist oboe	1. Moderato Cantabile - Allegro un poco mosso - 2. Enlace: Adagio - 3. Scherzo: Finale	Manuscript	
Op A-40 Belvedere: suite per a flauta i orquestra de corda / flauta i piano	Optional extension with wind section (0.2.2.2- 2.2.0.0-timp.)	1-En un prado cimero 2-Garbo 3-Ante la tumba de nuestra inolvidable Memé 4-Danza popular, que no lo es	Los Angeles: Affiliated Musicians / New York: Mills Music	24'30''
Op A-42 "Sonata di concerto" per a violoncel i piano	Cello and Piano	1- Adagio-Allegro energico 2- Andantino amabile 3- Allegro ritmico e giusto	Joan Manén (SGAE)	28'
Op A-43 "Elogio del fandango"	3.3. 2. 2. - 4. 3. 3. 1. - timp., perc., harp and strings		Chester Novello	20'
Op A-44 "Diálogo" per a arpa, flauta, violí, viola i violoncel	Harp, flute, violin, viola and cello		Manuscript	16'
Op A-45 Soledad	2.3.3.2 - 3.4.2.1-, harp, timpani, percussion, strings	Acte I - Acte II - Acte III	Manuscript	Acte I 65', acte II 40', acte III 50'
Op A-46 "Romanza mística" per a violí i orquestra de corda / violí i piano			Unión Musical Española	
Op A-47 Cor nº 3 El dos camins; Cor nº 4 Muntanya de Montserrat; Simfonia Ibèrica nº2	Simfonia: 3.3(C.i.).4.3 – 3.3.3.1- timpani, 2 perc., strings.	(Simfonia Ibèrica n. 2): 1. Andante quasi adagio 2. Allegro scherzando 3. Andante pesante 4. Final	Madrid, Grafispania (1959)	cor n. 3: 6' cor n. 4: 6'
Op A-48 Romança amorosa per a violí i orquestra de corda / violí i piano	String Orchestra and soloist violin		Unión Musical Española	10'
Op A-49 Concertino per a violí i orquestra; "Festividad", poema simfònic evocant una commemoració	(Concertino) 2-2-2-2/2-2-0-0-/ timpani/ strings / soloist violin ("Festividad") 3.3.3.3-4.3.3.1-3 timp., 1 perc., strings.		Manuscript	("Festividad") 13'
Op A-50 Rapsòdia Catalana per a piano i orquestra	2.2.2.2-2.2.0.0 - timp.- strings	Moderato cantabile- Allegretto mosso- Allegro- Doppio più lento- Allegro vivace	Manuscript	

== Discography ==
- 2012: "Obres per a violí i piano 1". Kalina Macuta, violin; Daniel Blanch, piano. Joan Manén Collection Vol. 1
- 2013: "Sardanes per a cobla". Cobla de cambra de Barcelona, conductor: Jordi Molina.
- 2014 "Concert da càmera per a violí i i orquestra nº2 i Concert per a oboè i orquestra". Orquestra Terrassa 48, conductor: Xavier Puig. Violin soloist: Kai Gleusteen. Joan Manén Collection Vol. 2
- 2015 "Obra Coral" Lieder Càmera, conductor Xavier Pastrana. Joan Manén Collection Vol. 3
- 2016 "Obres per a violí i piano 2". Kalina Macuta, violin; Daniel Blanch, piano. Joan Manén Collection, editat per La mà de Guido, LMG2138.
- 2020 Violin Concerto No. 3 Ibérico & Symphony No. 2 Ibérica. Ana María Valderrama, violin. Barcelona Symphony Orchestra, conductor: Darrell Ang. Naxos 8.574274-75
