= Ernst von Wolzogen =

German writer and cultural critic

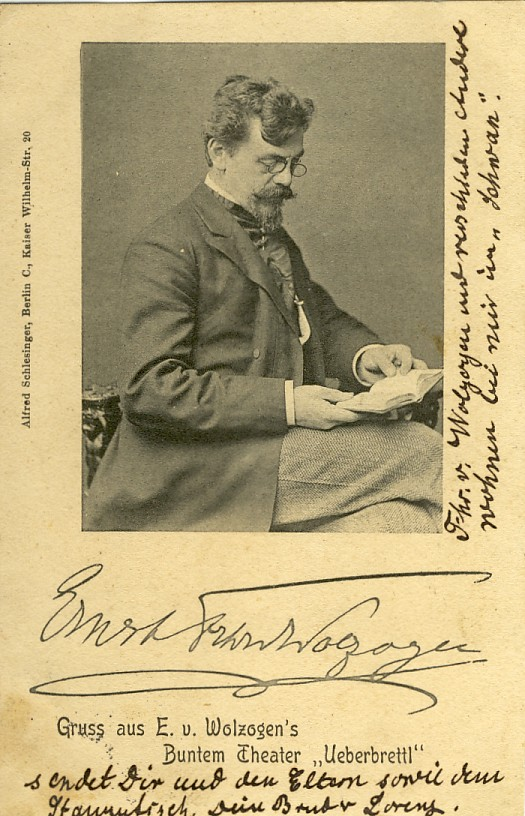
Ernst von Wolzogen

Ernst von Wolzogen (23 April 1855 – 30 August 1934) was a cultural critic, a writer and a founder of Cabaret in Germany.

== Biography ==
Wolzogen came from a noble Austrian family; he studied Literature, Philosophy, and the history of art in Strasbourg and Leipzig. In 1882, he went to Berlin where he worked as an editor at a publishing house and later became an independent writer. From 1892 to 1899, he lived in Munich where he founded the Freie Literarische Gesellschaft, a literary society. In 1899, he returned in Berlin where he established a Kabarett, the Überbrettl, named as a play on Nietzsche's term Übermensch. He married Elsa Laura Seemann von Mangern in 1902, and wrote social satires for Überbrettl. After its closure in 1905, he returned to Darmstadt.

Wolzogen produced a great many works of humorous fiction. Some of his works include Die Kinder der Exzellenz (1888); Das Lumpengesindel (1892); Ein unbeschriebenes Blatt (1896); Der Kraft-Mayr, 2 vols.(1897); Das dritte Geschlecht, 2 vols. (1899). Although primarily a humorist, he also wrote on serious topics. Works such as Fahnenflucht (1894), Das Wunderbare (1898), and Die arme Sünderin (1901) are examples of his more serious side as an author. Wolzogen work is known for its wit and elegance.

== Works ==
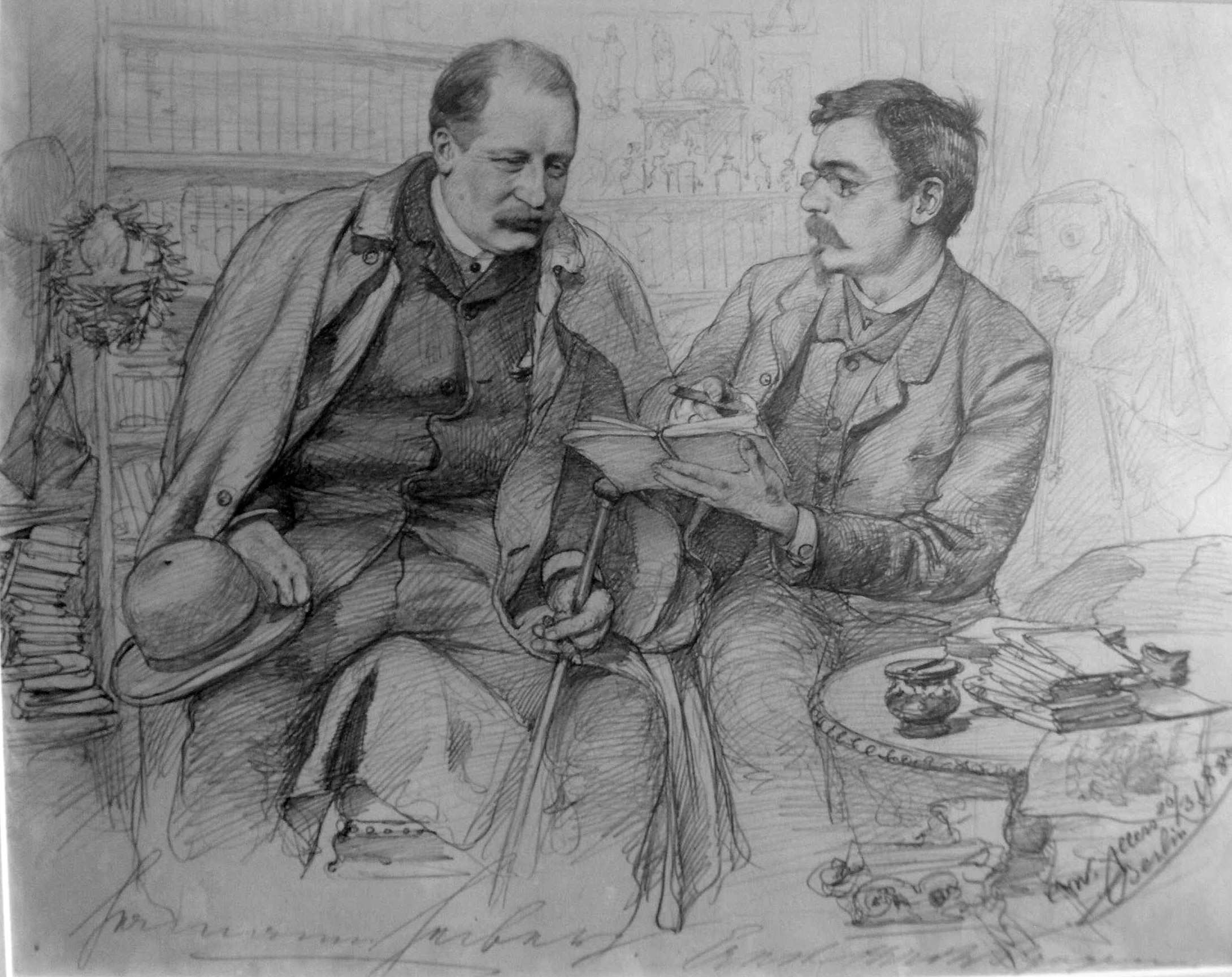
The writers Hermann Heiberg and Ernst von Wolzogen in Berlin

- 1879 Um 13 Uhr in der Christnacht
- 1885 Wilkie Collins: Ein Biographisch-Kritischer Versuch, biography
- 1886 Heiteres und Weiteres, poetry
- 1887 Thüringer Roman
- 1888 Die Kinder der Excellenz, novel
- 1890 Die tolle Komteß, novel
- 1890 Er photographiert, comedy
- 1892 Das Lumpengesindel, tragic comedy
- 1894 Das gute Krokodil und andere Geschichten
- 1897 Der Kraft-Mayr, novel
- 1897 Die Gloria-Hose, short story
- 1899 Das dritte Geschlecht, novel
- 1901 Feuersnot, opera libretto, set to music by Richard Strauss
- 1905 Verse aus meinem Leben
- 1923 Wie ich mich ums Leben brachte (autobiography; anti-semitic)
