= Perejaume =

Spanish contemporary artist

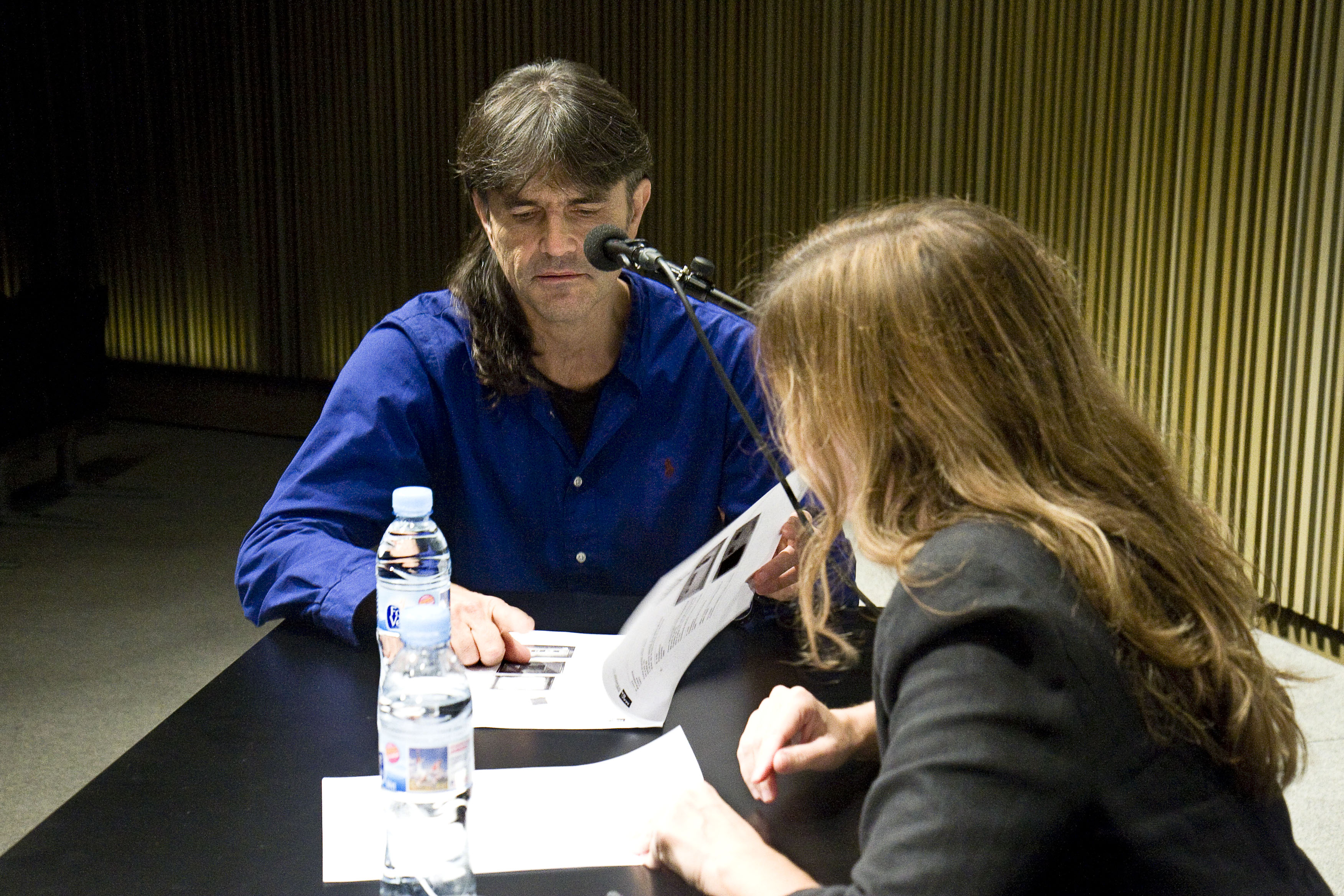
Perejaume being interviewed at MACBA

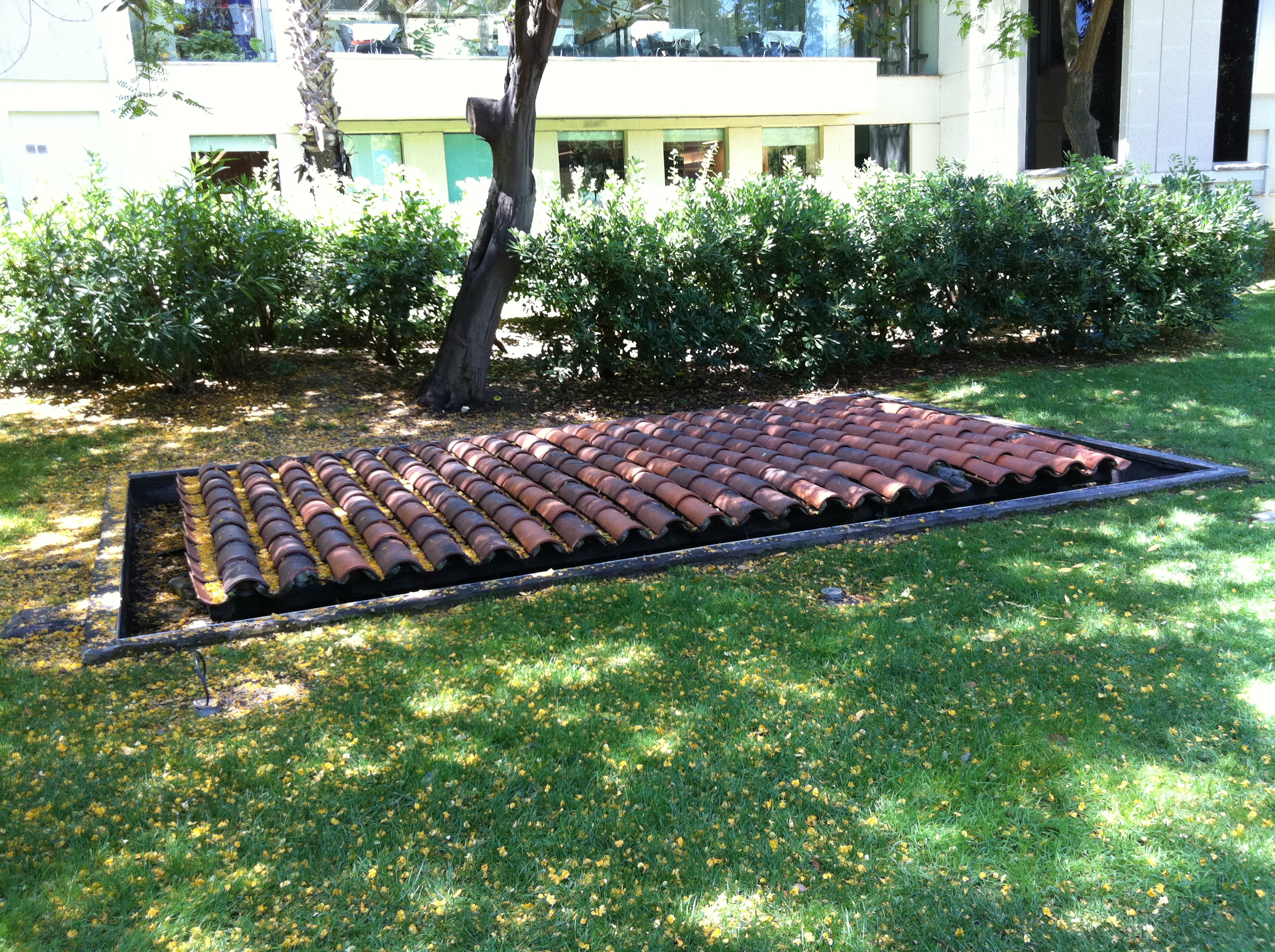
Teulada, 1988–1990, Perejaume's work at the sculpture garden next to the Fundació Joan Miró

Pere Jaume Borrell i Guinart, known as Perejaume, (born in 1957 in Sant Pol de Mar, Catalonia) is a Spanish contemporary artist.

Of self-taught formation he takes clear influences of authors like Joan Brossa, with whom he will share work mixing the painting and the poetry.

His work covers a discursive plane of subject matter that includes humans' relationship with nature, the society of the spectacle, and the reevaluation of modernist painting. He has been exhibiting his work around the world since 1990 in such institutions as the Arnolfini Gallery in Bristol, England, the Meyers Bloom Gallery in Santa Monica, California and the Galeria Joan Prats in Barcelona, Catalonia.

In 2005 he was awarded the Catalan National Prize of Visual Arts (granted by the Generalitat de Catalunya), in 2006 the Spanish National Award for Plastic Arts, and in 2007 the Spanish National Prize of Graphic Arts.

== Exhibitions ==
- 1984: "Postaler"
- 1988: "A 2.000 metres de pintura sobre el nivell del mar"
- 1989: "Fragments de monarquia"
- 1990: "Galeria Joan Prats, Coll de pal. Cim del Costabona"
- 1997: "Girona, Pineda, Sant Pol i la Vall d'Oo"
- 1999: "Deixar de fer una exposició"
- 2000: "Bocamont, Ceret, Figueres, el Prat, Tarragona i Vall"
- 2003: "Retrotabula"

== Published books ==
- 1989: Ludwig-Jujol. Què és el collage sinó acostar soledats?
- 1990: El bosc a casa, with Joan Brossa
- 1993: La pintura i la boca
- 1995: El paisatge és rodó
- 1998: Oïsme
- 1999: Dis-Exhibit
- 2000: Cartaci, with Joan Brossa
- 2003: Obreda
- 2004: Cims pensamenters de les reals i verdagueres elevacions
- 2007: L'obra i la por
- 2011: Pagèsiques (Premi Lletra d'Or, 2012)
- 2015: Paraules locals
