= Pedro Lavirgen =

Spanish tenor (1930–2023)

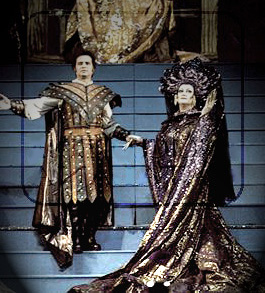
- Lavirgen performing Puccini's Turandot with Montserrat Caballé (1980)
- Born: 31 July 1930; Bujalance, Córdoba, Spain
- Died: 2 April 2023 (aged 92); Madrid, Spain
- Occupation: Tenor

Pedro Lavirgen Gil (31 July 1930 – 2 April 2023) was a Spanish tenor, whose career spanned over 30 years.

== Life and career ==
Born in Bujalance, during the civil war Lavirgen suffered a serious leg injury and remained in hospital for three years, joining the hospital choir and soon becoming a soloist. Once discharged, he studied at the Madrid Royal Conservatory and at the Escuela Superior de Arte Dramático. He started his career as a chorus singer at Radio Nacional de España and, later, at the Teatro de la Zarzuela. He made his debut as first tenor in 1959. In 1968 Lavirgen debuted at the Metropolitan Opera in New York, and in 1975 he made his debut at La Scala and at the Covent Garden Opera House. He also performed at Teatro Colón, Vienna State Opera, Palais Garnier, Verona Arena, and National Theatre Munich, among other venues.

After his retirement in 1993, he taught singing at the Madrid Royal Conservatory. Lavirgen died on 2 April 2023, at the age of 92.
