= Uwe Mund (conductor) =

Austrian conductor (born 1941)

- Born: March 30, 1941 (age 84); Vienna, Austria
- Occupation: Conductor
- Years active: 1962–to date

Uwe Mund (born March 20, 1941) is an Austrian conductor. At the age of fourteen he gave his first concert as solo pianist, and at sixteen he began his studies as a conductor and composer.

Born in Vienna, he became at the age of twenty conductor of the Vienna Boys' Choir, with which he toured Europe and America. He also conducted the Viennese Hofmusikkapelle, a court orchestra dating back to the Middle Ages. He became solo répétiteur for the Vienna State Opera and assistant conductor of the Wiener Singverein in 1963. He was music director at Musiktheater im Revier in Gelsenkirchen from 1977 until 1988, where his work and passion are considered to have defined an era.

He was music director at Gran Teatre del Liceu, Barcelona, from 1987 until 1994 and from 1998 at the Kyoto Symphony Orchestra. He was guest conductor at numerous other (opera) houses.
