= Marià Obiols =

Catalan composer and conductor

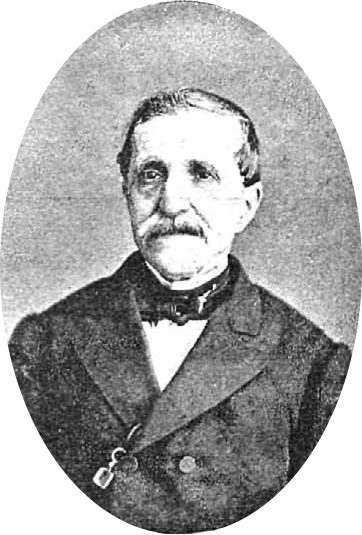
- Born: Josep Maria Obiols i Tramullas; 26 November 1809; Barcelona, Spain
- Died: 10 December 1888 (aged 79); Barcelona, Spain
- Other name: Mariano Obiols
- Occupations: composer; music educator

Marià Obiols (26 November 1809 – 10 December 1888), (Note: While most sources give the birth month of Obiols as November, Radigales i Babí (1998) gives it as September.) also known as Mariano Obiols, was a Catalan composer, conductor, and professor of music. He served as the music director of the Gran Teatre del Liceu in Barcelona from its founding in 1847 until his death. A protégé of Saverio Mercadante, he composed three operas, the cantata Il regio imeneo which inaugurated the Liceu theatre, art songs, chamber music, and several pieces of sacred music. His vocal music was largely Italianate in style, reflecting his years of study in Italy as well as the influence of Mercadante. As a professor at the Conservatori Superior de Música del Liceu, Obiols influenced the development numerous singers, composers, and conductors and wrote books on piano and solfège methods which became standard texts at the conservatory.
