= Carlos Pedrell =

Uruguayan composer, guitarist and educator

Carlos Pedrell (16 October 1878 – 9 March 1941) was a Uruguayan composer, guitarist and educator.

== Life ==
Pedrell was born in Minas, Uruguay; he was the nephew of the Spanish guitarist and composer Felipe Pedrell. Initially, he studied harmony at Montevideo before he went to Spain to study with his uncle. He then worked in Paris at the Schola Cantorum under Vincent d'Indy.

He returned to South America in 1906. Much of his career was spent in Argentina, where he taught at the National University of Tucumán and served as an inspector of schools in Buenos Aires. He returned to Paris in 1921 and died in the southern Paris suburb of Montrouge.

== Music ==
Pedrell's output includes operas (in particular, La guitarra to a libretto by Xavier de Courville) and ballets, and he is particularly remembered for his music for classical guitar. His best-known works for guitar are Lamento, Página romántica, and Guitarreo, which are dedicated to Andrés Segovia.
