= Lilly Hafgren =

Swedish opera singer (1884–1965)

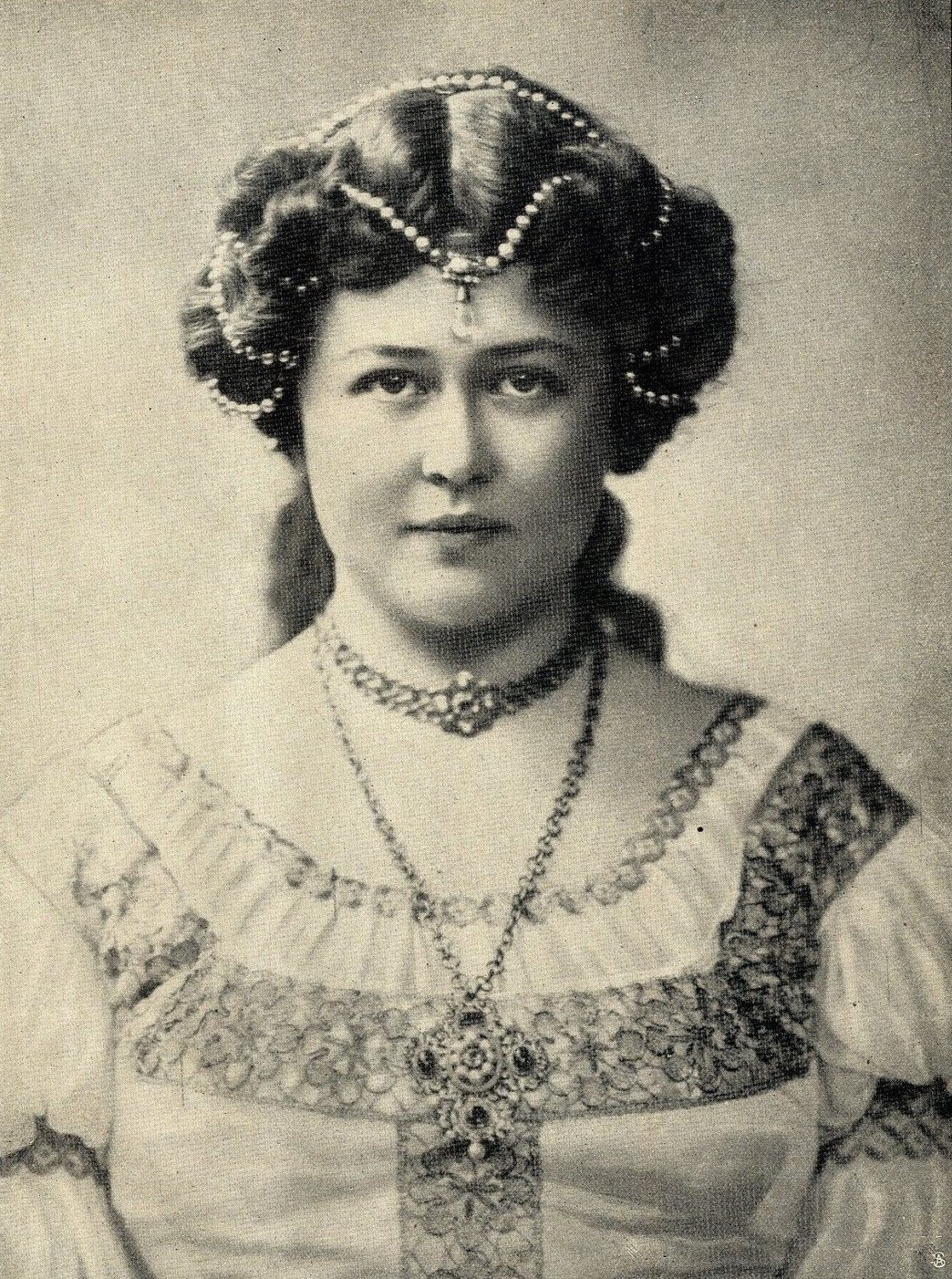
Hafgren as Eva in Wagner's Die Meistersänger (1912)

Lilly Johanna Maria Hafgren, also Lilly Hafgren-Waag, Lilly Hafgren-Dinkela, (7 October 1884, Stockholm — 27 February 1965, Berlin) was a Swedish operatic soprano who performed mainly in Germany. After studying in Frankfurt and Milan, in 1908 she made her debut in Bayreuth as Freia in Wagner's Rheingold. She went on to perform in a variety of roles at the Hofteater in Mannheim and at the Hofoper in Berlin. In the 1920s she appeared widely across Europe, including at Milan's La Scala, the Vienna Opera and the Royal Swedish Opera in Stockholm. Her final engagement was with the Dresen State Opera (1934–35). She is remembered above all for her leading soprano roles in the operas of Richard Wagner and Richard Strauss.

== Early life, education and family ==
Born on 7 October 1884, Lilly Johanna Maria Hafgren was the second child of the theatre director Johan Erik Hafgran (1834–1913) and his wife Maria née Malmgren (1859–1913), a concert singer. Her elder brother Lill Erik Gustaf became a pianist, composer and academic while her younger brother Hans Georg became a violinist. In 1892, the parents moved to Frankfurt, Germany, so that their children could study at the Hoch Conservatory. When she was eight, Lilly Hafgren started piano studies at the conservatory under Max Schwarz but in 1898 changed to voice under Maximilian Fleisch until 1902. Thereafter she received additional voice training in Stuttgart and Milan.

Hafgren was married twice, first in 1905 to the architect and theatre director Hans Waag with a divorce in 1919. From 1919, for the remainder of her life she was married to the art dealer Georg Dinkela from Berlin.

== Career ==
While living in Florence with her first husband, the architect and later theatre director Hans Waag, in 1907 she gave a concert in the home of Countess Blandine Gravina. Primarily performing as a pianist, she also sang a few pieces. Siegfried Wagner who was present invited her to an audition in Bayreuth where he was artistic director of the festival. As a result, in 1908 she made her debut in Bayreuth as Freia in Das Rheingold. Carl Hagermann, the director of the Mannheim opera was so impressed with her singing that he immediately engaged her. In 1910, she sang in Wagner concerts in Rome and Bologna. Over the next four years she performed a variety of youthful roles in Mannheim (1908–1912) but was also able to appear as a guest in the Netherlands, Italy, Austria and Hungary. Among her successes in this period were Elsa in Wagner's Lohengrin and Sieglinde in Die Walküre. Hafgren returned to Bayreuth in 1911, 1912 and 1924, singing Eva in Wagner's Die Meistersinger von Nürnberg. In 1909, she appeared there as Elsa in Lohengrin.

While at the Hofoper in Berlin (1912–1920), she sang Élisabeth in the German premiere of the later version of Verdi's Don Carlos in 1913. Other roles included the Countess in Mozart's The Marriage of Figaro, Leonora in Beethoven's Fidelio, Agata in Carl Maria von Weber's Der Freischütz, the title roles in Bizet's Carmen and Puccini's Tosca, and the Empress in Richard Strauss's Die Frau ohne Schatten. In 1920, she sang the Empress in the premiere of Richard Strauss's Die Frau ohne Schatten. Also while in Berlin, in 1913 at the Schauspielhaus she sang the title role in the premiere of Strauss's Ariadne auf Naxos.

From 1921, she appeared in the principal opera houses of Europe. In addition to those throughout Germany, these included Vienna, Basel, Prague, Rome, Lyon and Monte Carlo. In the spring of 1926, she spent two weeks in Stockholm where she performed her Wagner roles with the tenor Oscar Ralf under the baton of Armas Järnefelt. She spent no less than seven seasons at Milan's La Scala singing her Wagner roles under Arturo Toscanini. These included Brünnhilde in Die Walküre (1925–26) and the same role in 1924–25 in the full cycle of Der Ring des Nibelungen.

In 1934, she was engaged by the Dresden Staatsoper. Quite unexpectedly, in 1935 following her appearance in Die Frau ohne Schatten she announced her retirement. Despite the efforts of Richard Strauss who had conducted the work, she never returned to the stage. She spent the remainder of her life with her husband Georg Dinkela in Berlin.

Lilly Hafgren died in Berlin on 27 February 1965, aged 81.
