= Jaume Pahissa =

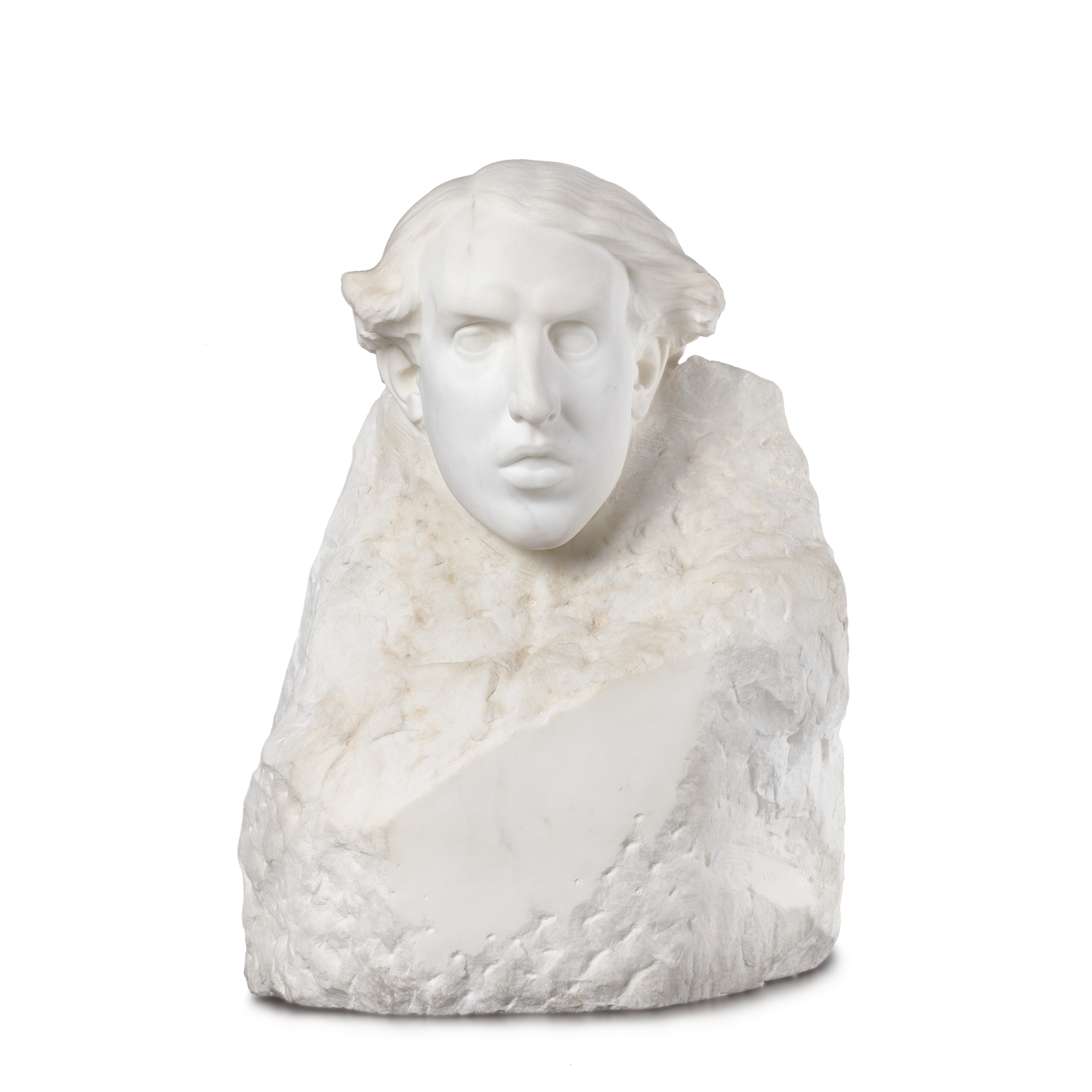
Bust of Jaume Pahissa

Jaume Pahissa i Jo (also Jaime; October 8, 1880 – October 27, 1969, in Buenos Aires, Argentina) was a Spanish-born composer and musicologist.

His students included Ana Serrano Redonnet.

The personal papers of Jaume Pahissa are preserved in the Biblioteca de Catalunya.
