= Felip Pedrell =

Catalan composer and musician

Felip Pedrell Sabaté
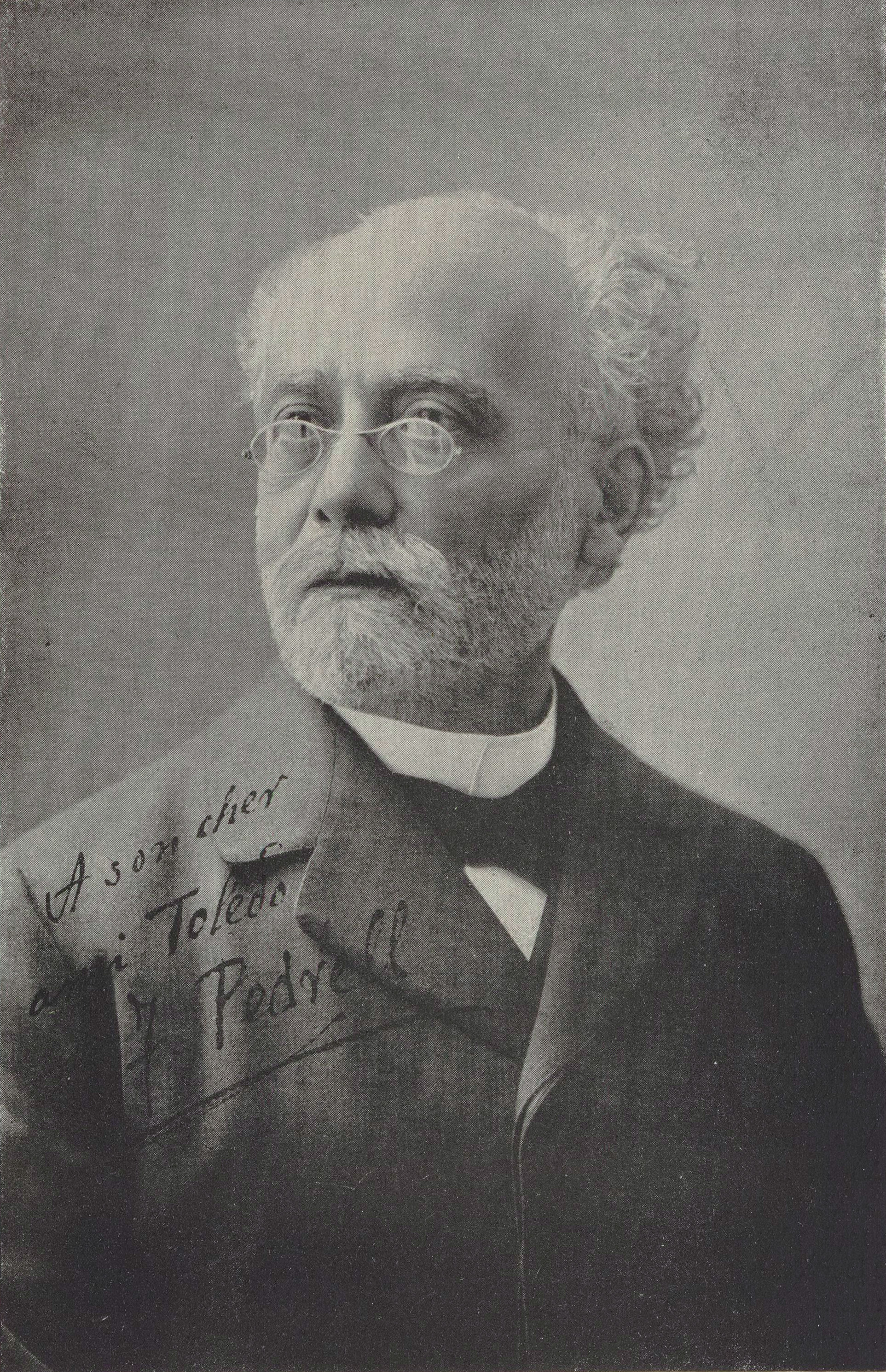
- Felip Pedrell
- Born: 19 February 1841; Tortosa, Catalonia, Spain
- Died: 19 August 1922 (aged 81); Barcelona, Catalonia, Spain
- Resting place: Sant Gervasi Cemetery, Barcelona
- Occupations: composer, guitarist and musicologist
- Known for: L'último Abenzeraggio (in Italian; Spanish title: El último abencerraje) (libretto: J. B. Altés), opera in 4 acts

Felip Pedrell Sabaté (Spanish: Felipe) (19 February 1841 – 19 August 1922) was a Catalan composer, guitarist and musicologist.

== Life ==
Pedrell was born in Tortosa (Catalonia), and sang as a boy soprano at Tortosa Cathedral from age 9, where he also received most of his musical education from its chapel master Joan Nin i Serra (1804–1867). On 29 September 1867 he married Carmen Domingo, with whom he had one daughter, also named Carmen.

In 1873 he went to Barcelona where he co-directed a zarzuela troupe and studied the guitar with José Brocá. As a guitarist, he became deeply influenced by Francisco Tárrega and dedicated several of his compositions to him (Impromptu, Floriada). By this time he had already written over 100 compositions, most of which salon music for piano, some songs, and works for the stage such as the opera L'último Abenzeraggio (first version: 1868), which was performed at the Teatro del Liceo in 1874. Between 1876 and 1880, Pedrell lived mainly in Italy and France: in Rome he discovered his musicological interest, and in Paris he worked mainly in composition, writing his song-cycle Orientales (words by Victor Hugo) and the symphonic poem Excelsior (1880).

In February 1880, he settled in Barcelona as a music teacher and composer, where he made the acquaintance of Isaac Albéniz and Enrique Granados who became his first pupils. Other notable pupils included the composers Rosa García Ascot, Manuel de Falla, and Joan Lamote de Grignon. After another performance of L'último Abenzeraggio in 1889, Pedrell seriously considered the founding of an "escuela nacional de música" (national school of music), combining elements of Spanish traditional music with the classical art music of his time. The first result was the opera Els Pirineus (1891), underlining his concept theoretically with the publication Por nuestra música (To Our Music; 1891), which made many composers and guitarists of his time aware of Spanish folklore. Influences were visible in Roberto Gerhard's eight Pedrell-derived folk-tunes (Cancionero de Pedrell), and Manuel de Falla's "Pedrelliana" – the last of his four Homenajes ("homages") (1939).

Between 1891 and 1904, Pedrell lived in Madrid, where he became a member of the Real Academia de Bellas Artes de San Fernando in 1895 and had a professorship in musical aesthetics and music history at the Real Conservatorio. In 1894, the first volume of his Hispaniae schola musica sacra appeared, a series of edited scores of renaissance and baroque church music from Spain. As a musicologist, Pedrell worked particularly in the early music field and edited Victoria's opera omnia and the requiem of Joan Brudieu. This and other of his writings fostered a keen interest in the early music of Spain. He returned to Barcelona in 1904, when his opera Els Pirineus was eventually performed.

When his daughter died in 1912, Pedrell fully withdrew from public life. His last pupils, the musicologist Higinio Anglès and the composer Roberto Gerhard, assisted Pedrell in his last publications and compositions. He died in Barcelona and was buried in the Sant Gervasi Cemetery. The composer Carlos Pedrell (1878–1941) is his nephew. The personal papers of Felip Pedrell are preserved in the Biblioteca de Catalunya.

Among his main direct disciples are Isaac Albéniz, Enrique Granados, Cristòfor Taltabull, Pedro Blanco, Joaquín Turina and Manuel de Falla.

== Works ==
Operas

- L'último Abenzeraggio (in Italian; Spanish title: El último abencerraje) (libretto: J. B. Altés), opera in 4 acts (1868, revised 1874 and 1889)
- Quasimodo (libretto: J. Barrer, after Victor Hugo), opera in 4 acts (1875)
- Els Pirineus (libretto: Victor Balaguer), opera in a prologise and 3 acts (1891)
- La Celestina (libretto: Pedrell, after Fernando de Rojas), opera in 4 acts (1902)
- El comte Arnau (libretto: Joan Maragall), "festival lirich popular" (1904)
- five other operas and eight zarzuelas

Instrumental works

- Nocturnos-trío (1873)
- La veu de les muntanyes (1877), symphonic poem
- Excelsior (1880), symphonic poem
- many works for piano and guitar

Songs for voice and piano

- Noches de España (1871)
- Orientales (Victor Hugo) (1876)
- Consolations (Théophile Gautier) (1876)
- La primavera (F. Matheu) (1880)
- Canciones arabescas (1906)

Choral music

- 56 sacred songs in Latin
- 27 works in colloquial Spanish or Catalan
- 18 works for chorus and orchestra
