= Music of Catalonia =

The music of Catalonia comprises one of the oldest documented musical traditions in Europe. In tandem with the rest of Western Europe, it has a long musical tradition, incorporating a number of different styles and genres over the past two thousand years.

== History ==
Among the earliest references to music from Catalonia date to the Middle Ages, when Barcelona and the surrounding area were relatively prosperous, allowing both music and arts to be cultivated actively. Catalonia and adjacent areas were the home for several troubadours, the itinerant composer-musicians whose influence and aesthetics was decisive on the formation of late medieval secular music, and who traveled into Italy and Northern France after the destruction of Occitan culture by the Albigensian Crusade in the early 13th century. The so-called Llibre Vermell de Montserrat ("Red Book of Montserrat") stands as an important source for 14th-century music.

Renaissance polyphony flourished in Catalonia, though local composers never attained the fame of either the Spanish composers to the South and West or the French composers to the North. Joan Pau Pujol wrote four books of polyphonic masses and motets in honor of the patron saint of Catalonia, St. George.

Performances of opera, mostly imported from Italy, began in the 18th century, but some native operas were written as well, including three by Isaac Albéniz and seven by Enrique Granados. The Barcelona opera house, Gran Teatre del Liceu, which opened in 1847, remains one of the most important in Spain; in addition, in the mid-19th century the first Barcelona Philharmonic Society was founded for the performance of orchestral music. Several symphonic orchestras exist in Catalonia today, including the Barcelona Orchestra.

=== 20th century ===
Around the beginning of the 20th century, two Catalan composers—Enric Granados and Isaac Albéniz—became the most famous composers in Spain. Francisco Tárrega and Miquel Llobet expanded the technical possibilities of guitar. Their music remains in the standard classical repertory today. Cellist Pau Casals is admired as an outstanding player. Frederic Mompou (1893–1987) is known for his delicate piano works, which often have a Catalan flavor. He spent most of his life in Paris, returning to his native Barcelona only during and after World War II.

A tradition of Catalan art songs also developed, following a similar popularity in the rest of Spain. These have been performed and promoted by Catalan artists, including an album of Catalan folk-songs by Victoria de los Angeles (1991) and an album of more classical songs by José Carreras (1991).

== Folk and popular music ==
Originally from northern areas of Catalonia, Sardanes are popular dances, and were especially widespread at the end of the 19th century. Currently, two main types, the original sardana curta (short sardana) style and more modern sardana llarga (long sardana), are generally performed. While music is performed by a cobla musical group, sardanes are danced in a circle dance. Other less common sardanes include the sardana de lluïment and the sardana revessa.

The cobla itself is an 11-piece band, that includes genuine folk instruments such as the flabiol (tabor pipe) and tambori, tenora, tible which are also used in other regions of Spain. Coblas also frequently play as concert bands without the dance.

Other popular music are the ball de bastons (stick dances), galops, espunyolets, ball de panderetes, ball de gitanes and the music of gralla (music) (a kind of Catalan shawm)and drums used in cercaviles or by colles diableres, etc.

Catalan music incorporates a number of unique instruments, including the flabiol, a type of pipe woodwind, tambori, a small drum, and the guitarra de canya, a xylophone-like instrument made of bones or reeds that is suspended from the musician's neck.

In areas around the river Ebre, like in nearby Aragon and Valencia, the jota is a popular dance.

Sung in both Catalan and Spanish, Havaneres have been very popular at parties since the end of the 19th century when sailors returned from the War of the Cuban Independence.

In the last half century, the rumba catalana genre has spread in Catalonia, played mostly by Gypsies, including popular performers like Peret and Gato Pérez.

During the end of the Franco period, a movement known as Nova Cançó emerged. Nova Cançó singers sang in Catalan, denouncing the official oppression of the language. The pioneering group of singer-songwriters, Els Setze Jutges, was founded in 1961 in Barcelona and came to include several singers from Catalonia, including Joan Manuel Serrat and Lluís Llach, as well as members from the Balearic Islands and Valencian Community. Grup de Folk and Esquirols were other notable cançó groups.

In the last 20 years, rock and roll has become popular, and a Catalan scene called rock català has appeared. Some very popular groups are Lax'n'Busto, Sau, Els Pets or Sopa de Cabra. and more recently, groups such as Doctor Prats and Buhos

In the wake of Mano Negra and Manu Chao's success, Catalonia has also produced a number of popular fusion and world music bands, such as Dusminguet or Cheb Balowski. Ojos de Brujo, a band from Barcelona merging traditional flamenco with hip-hop, has also become popular.

Contemporary music sung in Catalan has been relatively successful, and includes music in genres such as pop (Antònia Font, Manel, Els Amics de les Arts, Mishima, Obeses, Sanjosex) and hip-hop (At Versaris, Guillamino).
