= Vicenç Bou i Geli =

Vicenç Bou i Geli (19 January 1885 – 6 January 1962) was a Catalan Spanish composer. He was most well known for his compositions of the traditional sardanes, which he wrote with great fluency and little sophistication, but with a gift for charming and ingenious melody.

== Biography ==
Vicenç Bou was born in Torroella de Montgrí. His father was Genis Bou Carreras and his mother Rita Geli Fontanet. He had his first music lessons from his father who was a fiscorn player of the town cobla band La Lira, one of the oldest in Catalonia. Later he learnt his principal instrument, the flabiol, with Pere Rigau. However he first joined the La Lira band at the age of 15, as a trombonist.

He learnt violin with Josep Reixac and composition with Josep Maria Soler and Josep Pi, completing his formal musical education in 1906.

In 1906 he married Teresa Robau, with whom he had five sons.

== Sardanas ==
In 1909 he composed the first of his more than 175 sardanes, which are the works he is most well known for. Among his most popular are

- Esperança
- Cants de maig
- L'anell de prometatge
- Voliaines
- Angelina
- Continuïtat
- Girona aimada
- Festamajonera
- Mimosa
- Mar de xaloc
- Revetlla
- Esclats de joventut
- Tossa
- Flor de mar
- L'espigolera
- De Sant Feliu a S'Agaró
- Els meus de Barcelona
- La somrienta
- Montserrat
- Regalims del cor
- Èxtasi
- Mariagna
- Sospirs d'amor
- Otília
- Flor de llevant
- La mare cantora
- Mirambell
- Tonades de pastor
- El saltiró de la cardina
- Llevantina
- La cardina encara salta
- Pescadors bons catalans
- Torroella vila vella
- Record de Calella

== Musical legacy ==
In 1984 the family of the composer donated his personal archive to the Arxiu Historic de Torroella de Montgri. This consisted of 250 works in manuscript, 150 books and 200 written works. His sardana El saltiró de la cardina with words by Josep Maria Francès (composed 1912) is played in the 1957 film Spanish Affair.
