= Josep Maria Ventura i Casas =

Catalan musician and composer (1817–1875)

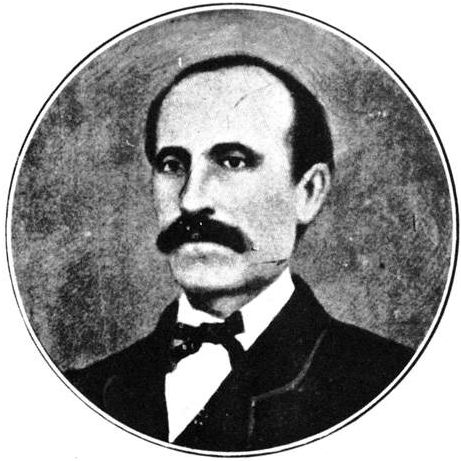
Pep Ventura

Josep Maria Ventura i Casas (Alcalá la Real (Jaén), 1817 – Figueres (Catalonia), 1875), popularly known as Pep Ventura, was a Spanish musician and composer from Catalonia who consolidated the long sardana and reformed the cobla, adding instruments to give it its current formation.

He is considered the father of the modern Sardana by the profound transformation that he printed to these compositions, based on giving it greater musical extension, in the inclusion of new instruments, especially the tenora (instrument creation of Andreu Turon) from 1849 and its arrangement in the cobla, which will imitate another musical formations of this type. His performance before the Queen Isabella II of Spain in the Monastery of Montserrat together with other artists of the Renaixença consecrated him as a figure in the Catalan cultural world.

== Life ==
Ventura's family came from the Catalan region of Empordà. He was born in Andalusia, where his father, a low-ranking military officer, was assigned to participate in the operations of repression of banditry that followed the War of Spanish Independence. At the age of two years, the family moved again to Catalonia, to the Gironan town of Roses in 1819, when the father was assigned to that city. The boy was soon left an orphan and went to live with his paternal grandfather. He learned the office of tailor and notions of solfège from his future father-in-law, Joan Llandrich, director of the cobla that bore his name. Around 1848, Ventura inherited the direction of the Llanrich cobla.

Ventura considered the sardana form too limited, always 98 measures and hardly two minutes in length, emerging as an important figure in the period of innovation of the sardana with an unlimited number of measures (long sardanes) in opposition to the traditional, short sardana.

He altered the composition of the cobla, which he likewise considered too limited, transforming the archaic cobla de tres quartans (bagpipes, shawm, flabiol and tambori) into a formation that was initially composed of five or seven musicians but which progressively incorporated brass instruments. He organized the woodwind and brass instruments into two rows, headed by a double bass. Other cobles adopted this model, which has endured with only small changes.

Ventura died in 1875 in Figueres, leaving his mark on Catalan musical culture. His melodies, arranged by masters like Pujol, Nicolau, and Lluís Albert, have made Pep Ventura immortal. He left 312 long sardanes, many of them untitled, and many short sardanes and choral compositions. His opus of 550 pieces is conserved, in Ventura's originally handwriting, in the archives of the Orfeó Català. There is a small street named after him in Barcelona, as well as a subway stop, presumably because of this achievement.
