= Xavier Montsalvatge =

Spanish composer and music critic (1912–2002)

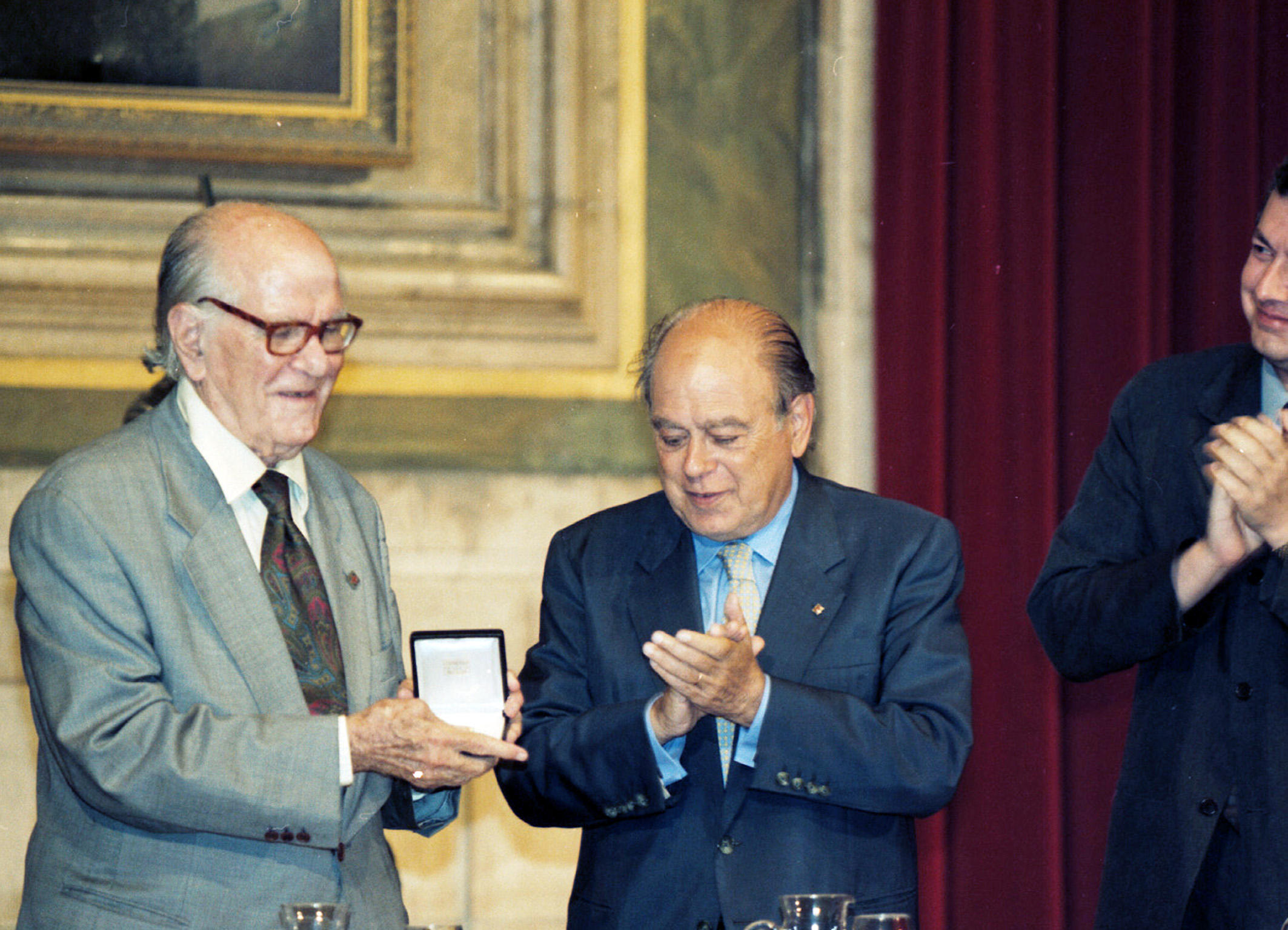
- Xavier Montsalvatge in 1999
- Born: 11 March 1912; Girona, Catalonia, Spain
- Died: 7 May 2002 (aged 90); Barcelona, Catalonia
- Resting place: Cementiri de Sant Gervasi, Barcelona, Spain
- Education: Conservatori Municipal de Música de Barcelona
- Occupations: Composer, music critic, music professor
- Known for: Cinco canciones negras
- Title: Creu de Sant Jordi (1983), Spanish "Premio Nacional de Música" (1985), Catalan "Premi Nacional de Música" (1997), Medalla d'Or de la Generalitat de Catalunya (1999); Doctor Honoris Causa, Universitat Autònoma de Barcelona; Chevalier de l'Ordre des Arts et Lettres.
- Spouse: Elena Pérez de Olaguer (m. 1947)
- Children: Xavier, Yvette
- Website: https://www.montsalvatgecompositor.com/

Xavier Montsalvatge i Bassols (Catalan: [ʃəβiˈe munsəlˈβadʒə]; 11 March 1912 – 7 May 2002) was a Spanish composer and music critic. He was one of the most influential figures in Catalan music during the latter half of the 20th century.

== Biography ==
=== Life ===
Montsalvatge was born in Girona, and studied violin and composition at the Barcelona Conservatory. His principal teachers were Lluís Maria Millet, Enric Morera, Jaume Pahissa, and Eduard Toldrà. After the Spanish Civil War, Montsalvatge began work as a music critic when he joined the weekly Destino in 1942, a publication he would eventually direct in 1968 and 1975. He wrote additionally for the daily La Vanguardia after 1962. Montsalvatge also returned to teach at his alma mater, becoming a lecturer in 1970, and then a professor of composition in 1978. In 1982 he served on the jury of the Paloma O'Shea Santander International Piano Competition. He was awarded Spain's Premio Nacional de Música for composition in 1985. He died in Barcelona, aged 90, and was buried at the Sant Gervasi Cemetery Barcelona.

=== Work ===
Montsalvatge's style evolved over several different phases. At the start of his career, he was strongly influenced by the twelve-tone technique and by Wagnerism, which together dominated the Catalan music scene during the period represented by his Sinfonía mediterránea of 1949. In the following period, he found inspiration in the music of the Antilles (Cinco canciones negras, 1945; Cuarteto indiano, 1952). His steady contact with the French composers Olivier Messiaen and Georges Auric led to a crucial change in his style, which soon became characterized by free polytonality (Partida, 1958). The final phase of Montsalvatge's work revealed the influence of the avant-garde.

Montsalvatge explored virtually all musical forms in his composition. His work ranges in scale from operas (El gato con botas, Una voz en off) to chamber music (Cuarteto indiano), in between which lie his orchestral works, such as the Desintegración morfológica de la Chacona de Bach, the Laberinto o Sinfonía de réquiem, and the prizewinning Sinfonía mediterránea and many solo piano works including the well known Sonatine pour Yvette (Sonatina for Yvette) written and inspired by his young daughter at the time. He owed his international fame chiefly to one charming and outstanding work: the Cinco canciones negras for mezzo-soprano and orchestra, a blend of Antillean rhythms and themes; among them, the best known is the Canción de cuna para dormir un negrito (Lullaby to sleep a black child). He wrote film music and in 1987, his score for the picture Dragon Rapide, about Francisco Franco, was nominated as the best original music at the Goya Awards.

== Important works ==
- Cinco canciones negras (1945) (Five black songs)
- Concerto breve (1953) for piano and orchestra
- Canciones Para Niños (1953) (Songs for Children)
- Sonatine pour Yvette - piano solo (1962)
- Babel (1967)
- Homenaje a Manolo Hugué (1971)
- Serenata a Lydia de Cadaqués (1971)
- Reflexions-obertura (1975)
- Concert capriccio (1975) for harp and orchestra
- Fantasía (1985) for harp and guitar
- Simfonia de Rèquiem (1985)
- Bric à brac (1993)
- "Partita 1958" (1958)
- "Euro fanfàrria"

Choral works

- Tres canciones negras (1946) for soprano, mixed chorus, and piano

Operas

- El gato con botas (Puss in Boots), adapted from the fairy tale by Charles Perrault
- Una voce in off
- Babel 46 (opera, 2002 premiere)

Ballet

- Perlimplinada, music in collaboration with Federico Mompou
- Manfred (1945)

Music for cobla ensemble

- Elegia a Juli Garreta (1946)
- Madrigal en forma de sardana (1945)

Piano Music

- 3 Impromptus (1933)
- 4 Dialogues for piano (1940)
- 3 Divertimentos (1941)
- Divagación (1950)
- Elegía a Maurice Ravel (1952)
- Sonatina para Yvette (1961/2)
- Sketch (1966)
- Alegoría a la Memoria de Joaquín Turina (1982)
- Si, a Mompou, for left hand alone (1983)
- Berceuse a la memoria de Oscar Esplá, for left-hand alone (1986)
- Una página/Balada para Rubinstein, for left-hand alone (1987)
- El Arca de Noë (Noah's Ark) Suite (1990)
- Dialogues in Memory of Ricardo Viñes
- Schubertiana (1993)
- Pastoral d'Automne (1995)
- 5 ocells en llibertat (1997)
- Bressoleig (1998)
- Homenatge a Victoria de los Ángeles (Piano 4 hands) (1998)
- Alborada en Aurinx (1999)
- Improviso epilogal (1999)
