= Sanjosé =

Sanjosé is a surname. Notable people with the surname include:

- Carles Sanjosé (born 1977), known professionally as Sanjosex, Spanish/Catalan musician and architect
- Francisco Sanjosé (1952–2026), Spanish footballer
