= Mazoni =

Catalan singer-songwriter and record producer

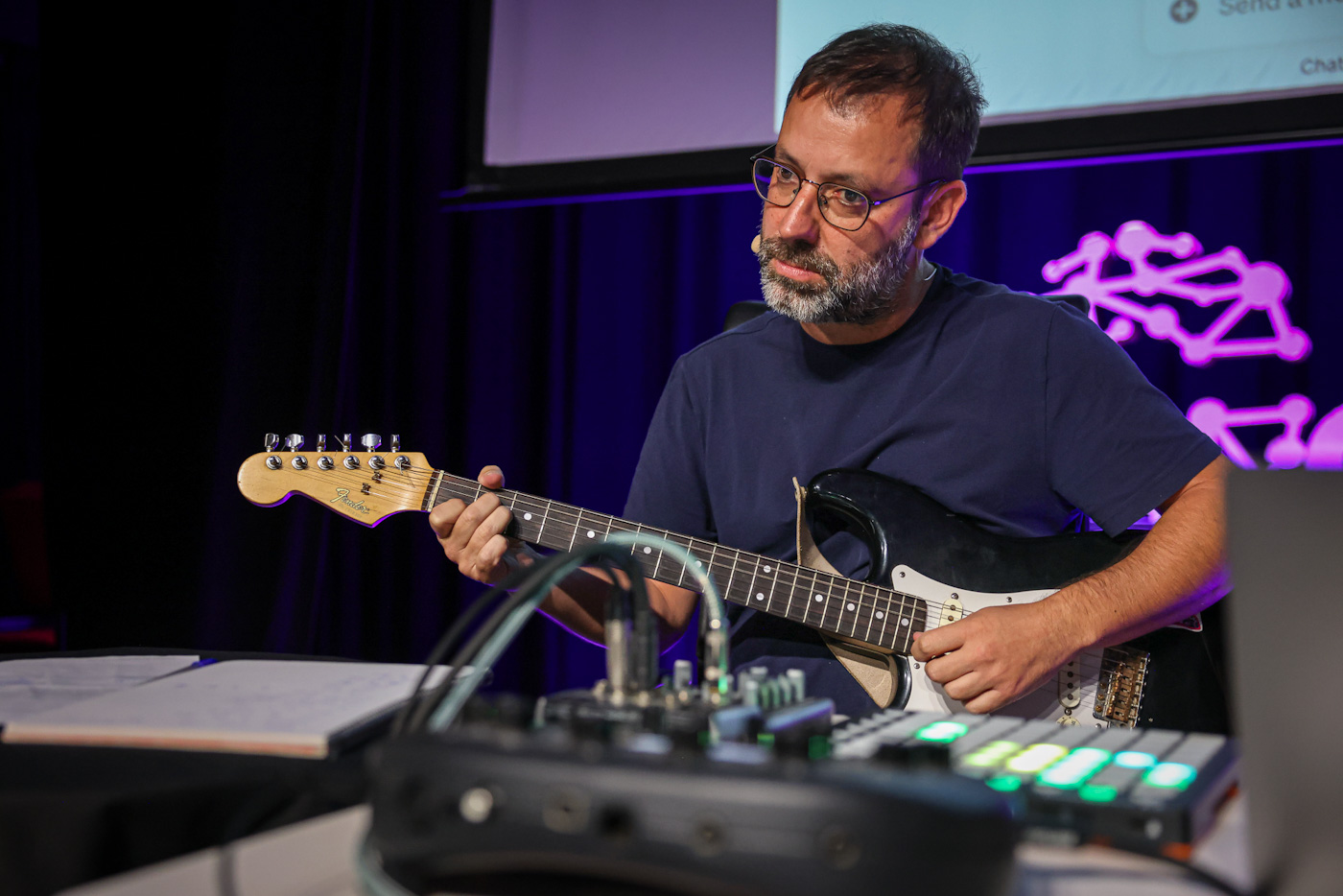
- Mazoni at Catosfera 2023

Background information
- Born: Jaume Pla; 1977 (age 48–49); La Bisbal d'Empordà, Catalonia
- Genres: Indie rock, Pop rock, Indie pop
- Occupations: Singer-songwriter, record producer
- Years active: 2004–present
- Label: Bankrobber

Jaume Pla (born 1977), known professionally as Mazoni, is a Catalan singer-songwriter and record producer. He began his solo career in 2004 and has since become a prominent figure in contemporary Catalan independent music.

== Biography ==
Jaume Pla was born in La Bisbal d'Empordà, in the Baix Empordà region of Catalonia. He began playing music at an early age and formed his first band at 13 with Carles Sanjosé (later known as Sanjosex). He later became the singer of the indie band Holland Park.

Mazoni released his debut solo album, 7 songs for a sleepless night, in 2004 through the independent label Bankrobber.

In 2006, he released Esgarrapada, followed by Si els dits fossin xilòfons in 2007. His 2009 album Eufòria 5 – Esperança 0 consolidated his presence in the Catalan indie scene.

In 2010 Mazoni undertook an ambitious project: a tour of 31 concerts in 31 consecutive days, later documented in the live album 13.31.

In 2011 he released Fins que la mort ens separi, presented live at the prestigious Palau de la Música Catalana.

In 2014 Mazoni released Sacrifiqueu la princesa, a record marking a shift towards electronic textures and keyboard-driven arrangements.

In 2016 he returned to English-language songwriting with 7 songs for an endless night, produced by Brendan Lynch.

Mazoni received critical attention for his 2019 album Desig imbècil, released through Enderrock.

In 2021 he released Ludwig, an album built from fragments of public-domain works by Ludwig van Beethoven. In interviews, Pla explained that the project was inspired by reading a biography of the composer.

=== Recent work ===
After a brief hiatus, Mazoni announced his return in 2025 with a new album titled Banderes per daltònics, to be released in September. He discussed the themes of the album in an interview with VilaWeb.

== Discography ==
- 7 songs for a sleepless night (2004)
- Esgarrapada (2006)
- Si els dits fossin xilòfons (2007)
- Eufòria 5 – Esperança 0 (2009)
- 13.31 (live, 2010)
- Fins que la mort ens separi (2011)
- Sacrifiqueu la princesa (2014)
- 7 songs for an endless night (2016)
- Carn, os i tot inclòs (2017)
- Cançons robades (2018)
- Desig imbècil (2019)
- Ludwig (2021)
- Banderes per daltònics (2025)
