= La Santa Espina =

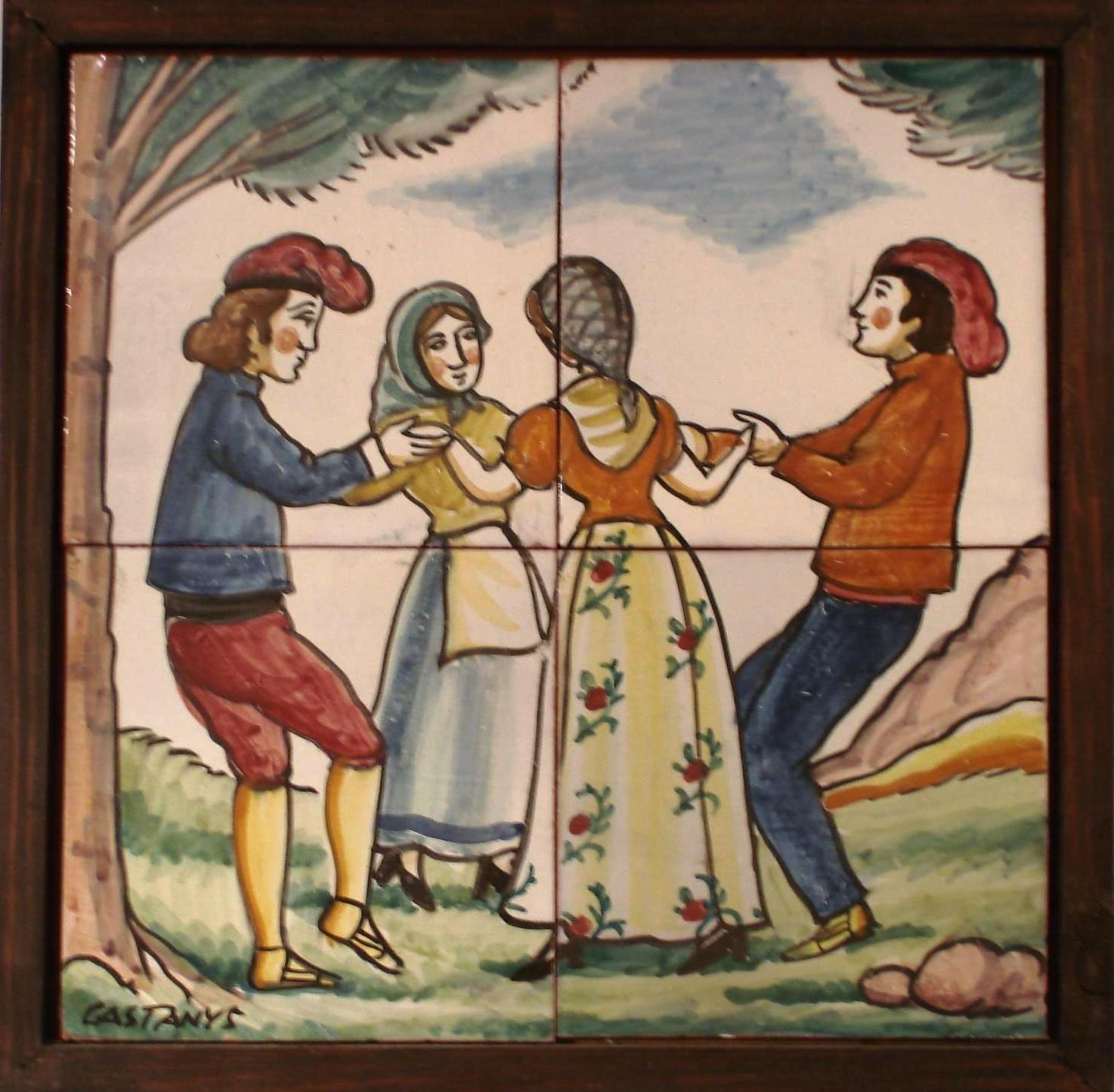

Song by Enric Morera i Viura
- Language: Catalan
- English title: The Holy Thorn
- Released: 1907
- Genre: Sardana
- Songwriter: Àngel Guimerà

La Santa Espina (Catalan pronunciation: [lə 'santəs'pinə]; The Holy Thorn) is a sardana composed by Enric Morera with lyrics written by Àngel Guimerà. It is the most emblematic of all sardanas and is considered a patriotic hymn by the Catalans.

It was premiered in 1907 in the Teatre Principal of Barcelona as part of a zarzuela of the same name and nowadays is usually performed as the final piece in many cobla concerts. Because of its Catalanist connotations La Santa Espina was prohibited during the dictatorships of Primo de Rivera (1923–1930) and Francisco Franco (1939–1975), when also the Catalan national anthem Els Segadors was forbidden.

== Lyrics ==
Original text

Som i serem gent catalana
tant si es vol com si no es vol,
que no hi ha terra més ufana
sota la capa del sol.

Déu va passar-hi en primavera
i tot cantava al seu pas.
Canta la terra encara entera,
i canta que cantaràs.

Canta l'ocell, lo riu, la planta
canten la lluna i el sol.
I tot treballant la dona canta,
i canta al peu del bressol.

I canta a dintre de la terra
el passat ja mai passat,
i jorns i nits, de serra en serra,
com tot canta al Montserrat.

Som i serem gent catalana
tant si es vol com si no es vol,
que no hi ha terra més ufana
sota la capa del sol.

English translation

We are and we shall be Catalan people
Whether others like it or not,
For there isn't a more beautiful land
Anywhere under the sun.

God passed through it in Springtime
And everything sang as He walked by.
The land still entire is singing
And it shall keep on singing more and more.

The bird, the river and the plant sing,
As do the moon and the sun.
And as she works, the woman sings,
She sings right at the foot of the cradle.

And inside the land is singing
The past that never came to be,
And days and nights, from a mountain range to another,
As everything sings in Montserrat.

We are and we shall be the Catalan people
Whether others like it or not,
For there isn't a more beautiful land
Anywhere under the sun.

== Recorded versions ==
La Santa Espina was first recorded in 1907 by the cobla La Principal de Peralada and is always included in all recording compilations of the best and most popular sardana songs. Due to its popularity and symbolic relevance, it has been also performed by many musicians other than classic sardana bands.

One of these alternative versions is the jazzy cover by Charlie Haden and Carla Bley in the famous Liberation Music Orchestra's album The Ballad of the Fallen (1983). More recently, it has been also interpreted in different styles by Catalan artists like Marina Rossell and Toti Soler.
