= The Ballad of the Fallen =

Studio album by Charlie Haden
- Released: 1 October 1983
- Recorded: November 1982
- Genre: Avant-garde jazz, experimental big band
- Length: 51:51
- Label: ECM 1248
- Producer: Manfred Eicher

Charlie Haden chronology
Time Remembers One Time Once (1983)	The Ballad of the Fallen (1983)	Quartet West (1987)

Liberation Music Orchestra chronology
Liberation Music Orchestra (1970)	The Ballad of the Fallen (1983)	Dream Keeper (1990)

The Ballad of the Fallen is a jazz album by bassist Charlie Haden, with arrangements by Carla Bley. It was recorded in November 1982 and released on ECM Records in October 1983.

The album is the second by Haden's Liberation Music Orchestra, the follow-up to their 1969 Liberation Music Orchestra. Carla Bley, Don Cherry, Michael Mantler, Paul Motian, Dewey Redman, and Haden appeared in the LMO's new incarnation with six new members.

== Reception ==
Professional ratings
Review scores
Source	Rating
AllMusic	3/5 stars
The Penguin Guide to Jazz Recordings	3.5/4 stars
The Rolling Stone Jazz Record Guide	4/5 stars

The album was voted jazz album of the year in DownBeat's 1984 critic's poll. Haden and Carla Bley placed first in that 1984 poll's “Acoustic Bass” and “Composer” categories, respectively.

== Track listing ==
- Side A

1. "Els Segadors" ("The Reapers") (Catalan traditional) – 4:14
2. "The Ballad of the Fallen" (folk song from El Salvador) – 4:19
3. - "If You Want to Write Me" ("Si Me Quieres Escribir") (traditional) – 3:55
4. - "Grandola Vila Morena" (José Afonso) – 2:11
5. - "Introduction to People" (Carla Bley) – 3:55
6. - "The People United Will Never Be Defeated" ("El Pueblo Unido Jamás Será Vencido!") (Sergio Ortega) – 1:40
7. "Silence" (Charlie Haden) – 5:49

- Side B

1. "Too Late" (Carla Bley) – 8:24
2. "La Pasionaria" (Charlie Haden) – 10:26
3. "La Santa Espina" (Àngel Guimerà/Enric Morera) – 6:58

== Personnel ==
Liberation Music Orchestra

- Charlie Haden – double bass
- Carla Bley – piano, glockenspiel, arrangements
- Dewey Redman – tenor saxophone
- Jim Pepper – flute, soprano saxophone, tenor saxophone
- Steve Slagle – clarinet, flute, alto saxophone, soprano saxophone
- Michael Mantler – trumpet
- Gary Valente – trombone
- Sharon Freeman – French horn
- Jack Jeffers – tuba
- Don Cherry – pocket trumpet
- Mick Goodrick – guitar
- Paul Motian – percussion, drums
