= Flugelhorn =

Brass musical instrument

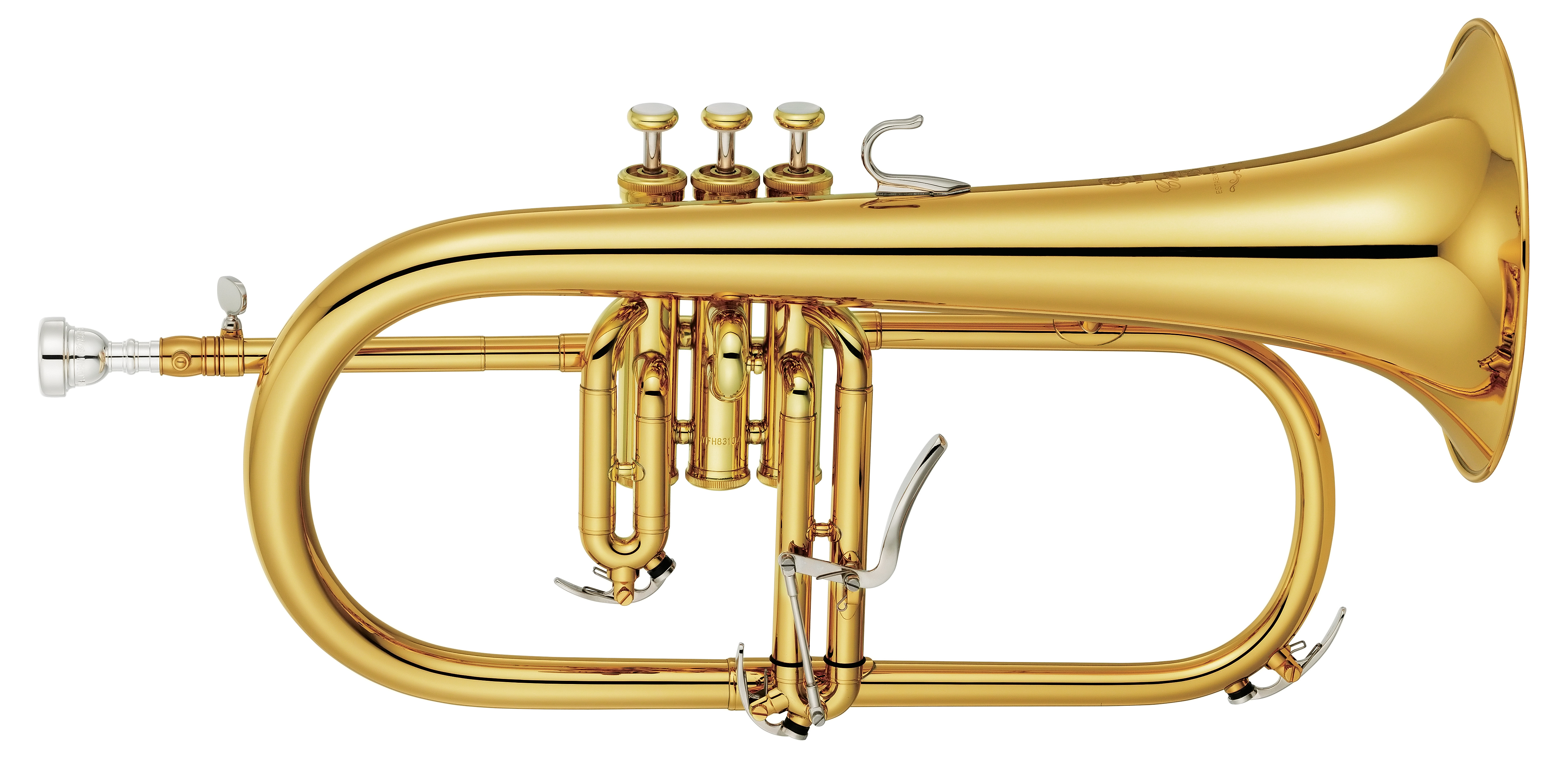
- A standard 3-valved B♭ flugelhorn

Brass instrument
- Classification: Aerophone; Wind; Brass
- Hornbostel–Sachs classification: 423.232 (valved lip-reed aerophone with wide conical bore)
- Developed: Early 19th century

Playing range
- Range of the three-valve flugelhorn in B♭

Related instruments
- Trumpet; Cornet; Keyed bugle; Saxhorn; Tenor horn; Fiscorn

The flugelhorn (/ˈfluːɡəlhɔːrn/, also fluegelhorn, flugel horn; from German, Flügelhorn) is a high brass instrument similar to the trumpet and cornet, but with the wider conical bore of a bugle, producing a darker, mellower sound or timbre. Like trumpets and cornets, most flugelhorns are built in B♭, though some are in C. Developed in Germany in the late 18th century from earlier traditional signal instruments, bugles were fitted with tone holes to produce keyed bugles around 1800. The keyed bugle was soon replaced by valved bugles after the invention of valves in the 1820s. Modern flugelhorns usually have piston valves, though flugelhorns with rotary valves are common in central and eastern Europe. Initially adopted by military and brass bands in Europe, the flugelhorn began to be used as a solo jazz instrument in the mid 20th century by musicians including Miles Davis, Shorty Rogers, Clark Terry, and Chuck Mangione. It has established a place in band, jazz, and popular music, and is commonly played by trumpet players as a doubling instrument.

== History ==
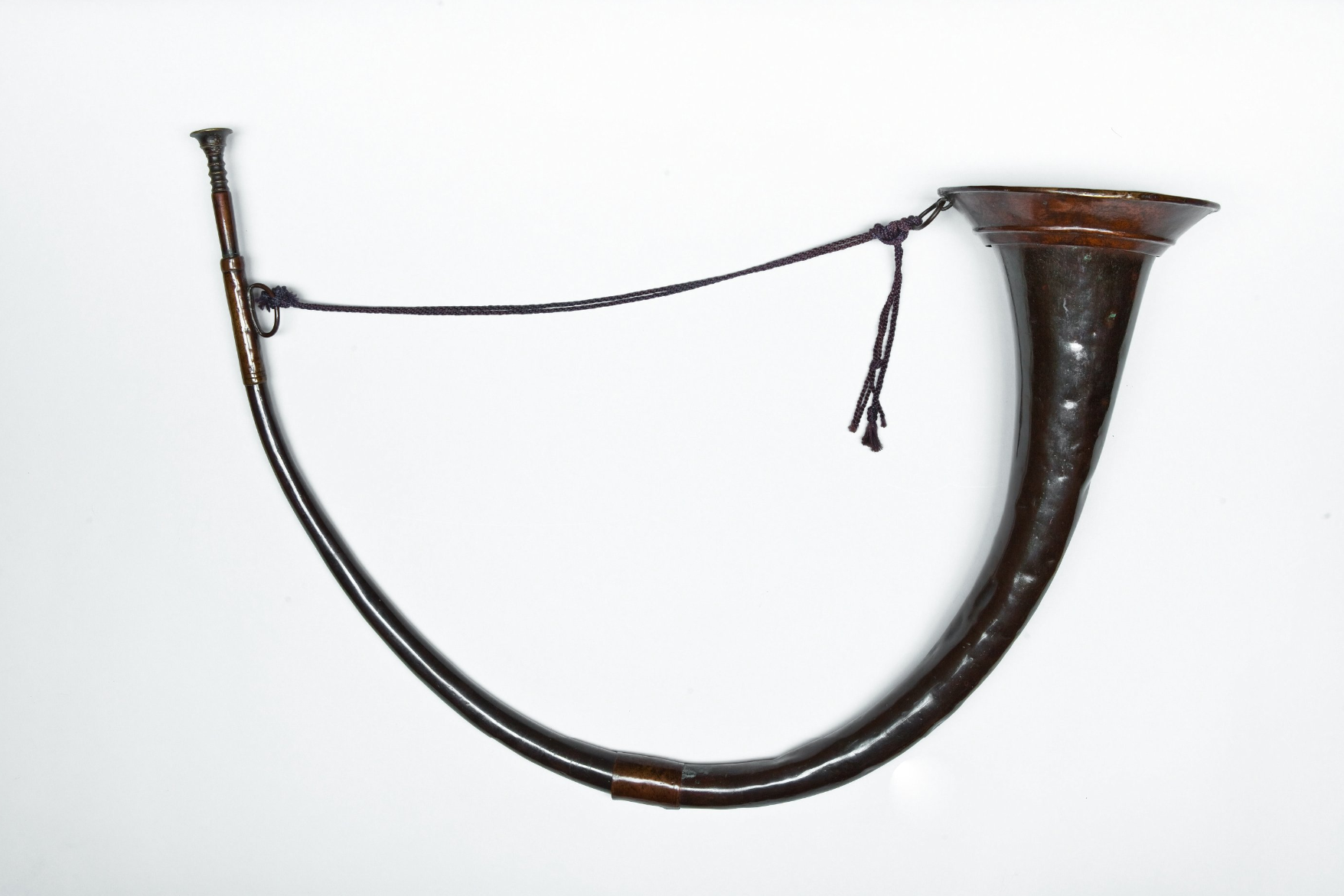
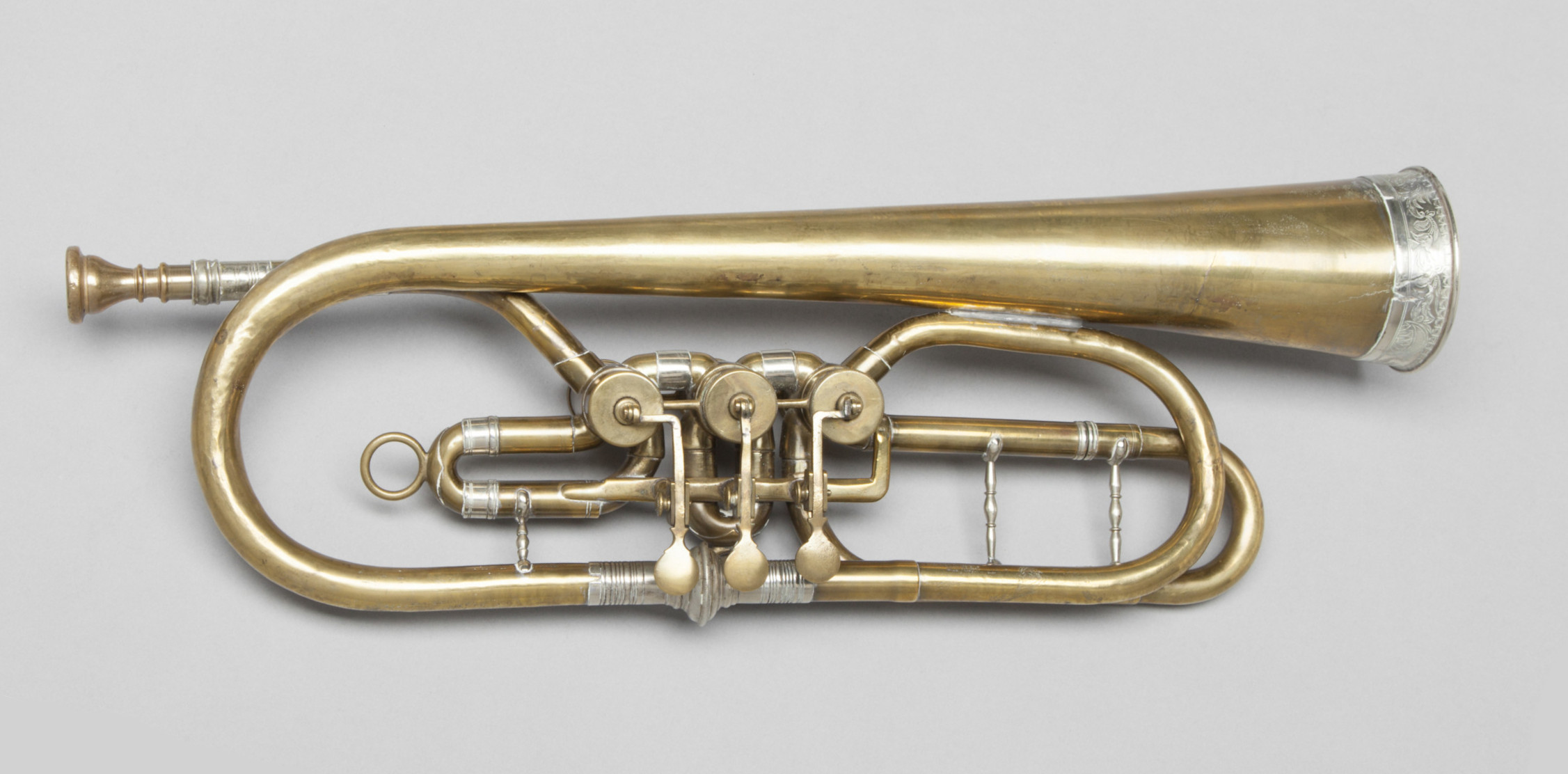
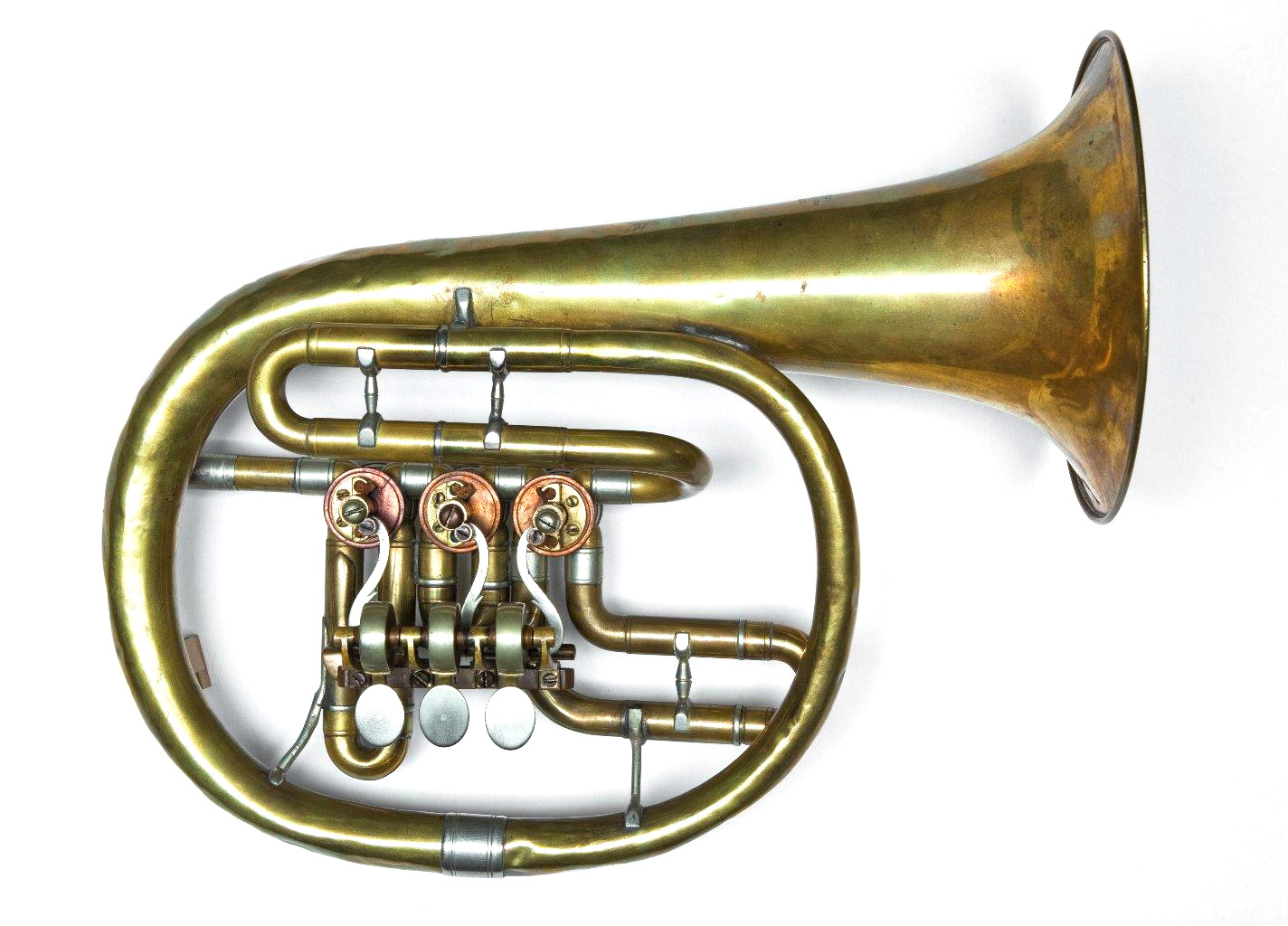
Hanoverian Halbmond bugle horn c. 1790, top; flugelhorn by Moritz, early 1840s; kuhlohorn, c. 1920 (University of Edinburgh; Musical Instrument Museum, Berlin)

The German word Flügel means wing or flank in English. In early 18th century Germany, a ducal hunt leader known as a Flügelmeister used a Flügelhorn to direct his wing of the hunting party. It was originally a form of signal horn called a Halbmond (lit. 'half-moon'), a large, semicircular brass or silver valveless horn with a conical bore. Military use dates from the Seven Years' War, during which the instrument was employed as a predecessor of the bugle.

By the end of the 18th century, attempts were made to extend the bugle's limited natural series of six to eight notes to a full chromatic scale using tone holes and keys, resulting in the first keyed bugles appearing in Dublin and London around 1800. The keyed bugle was adopted by British and European military and brass bands, and helped to popularize the melodic and virtuosic playing of brass instruments to new and wide cross-sections of the general public.

The first bugles with valves were sold in Berlin in 1828 by Heinrich Stölzel, inventor of the first piston valves. Based on the keyed bugle, the valved bugle retained the bell construction of red brass or copper with brass or nickel silver keys and fittings. The valved bugle was called the Flügelhorn in Bavaria and replaced the keyed bugle as the primary soprano melody instrument in Bavarian bands and ensembles, and has remained in that role since. The valved bugles also provided the Paris-based instrument maker Adolphe Sax, creator of the saxophone, with the inspiration for his saxhorn family of instruments, including the B♭ soprano size which served as the model for the modern piston-valve flugelhorn.

A variant of the rotary valve flugelhorn is the oval-shaped kuhlohorn in B♭ developed in the late 1890s by Johannes Kuhlo. Kuhlo and his father Eduard Kuhlo founded the Posaunenchor movement, which introduced brass ensemble music to German Protestant churches. The kuhlohorn provided a softer soprano, closer to the human voice than the trumpet.

== Construction ==
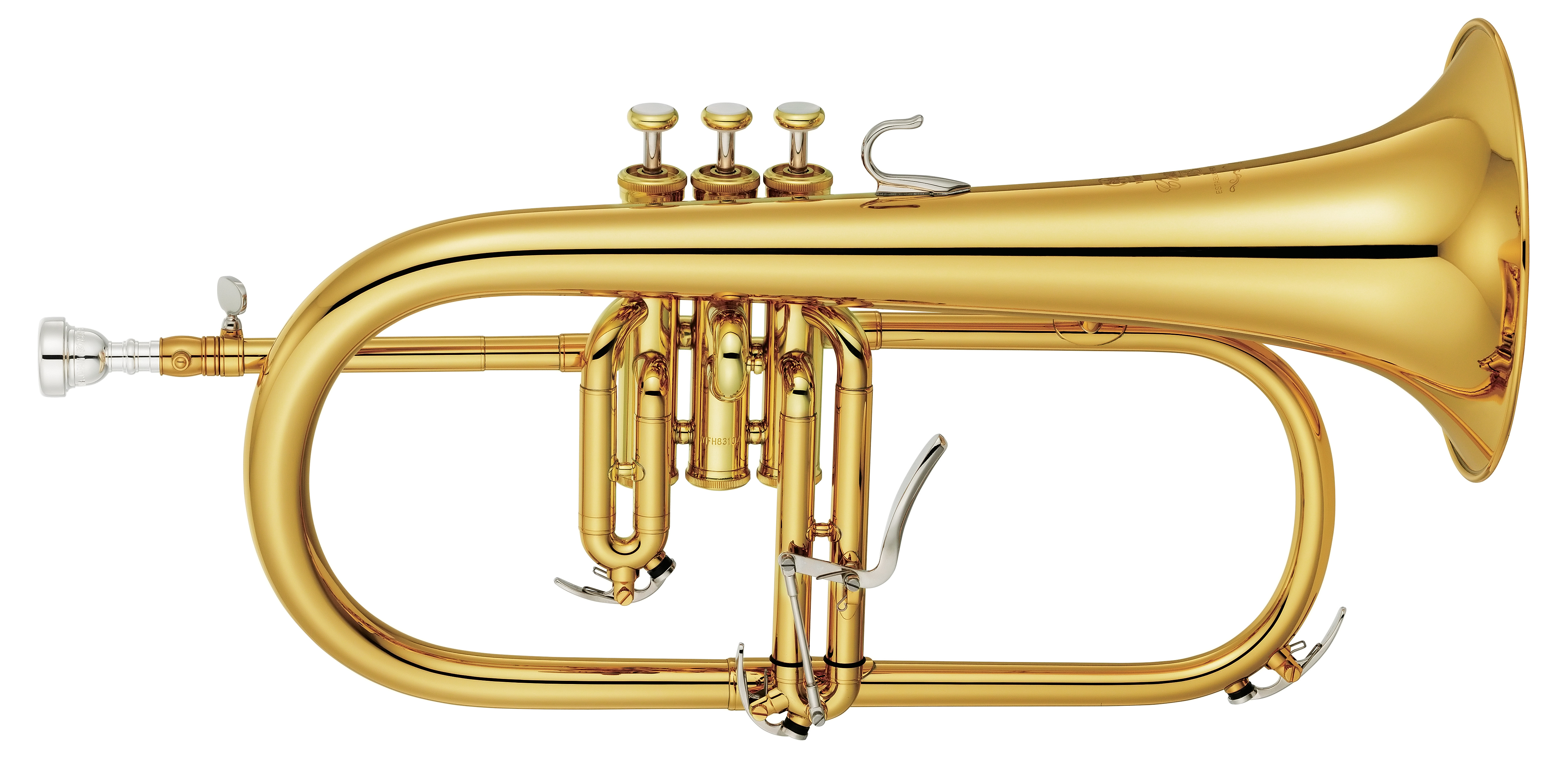
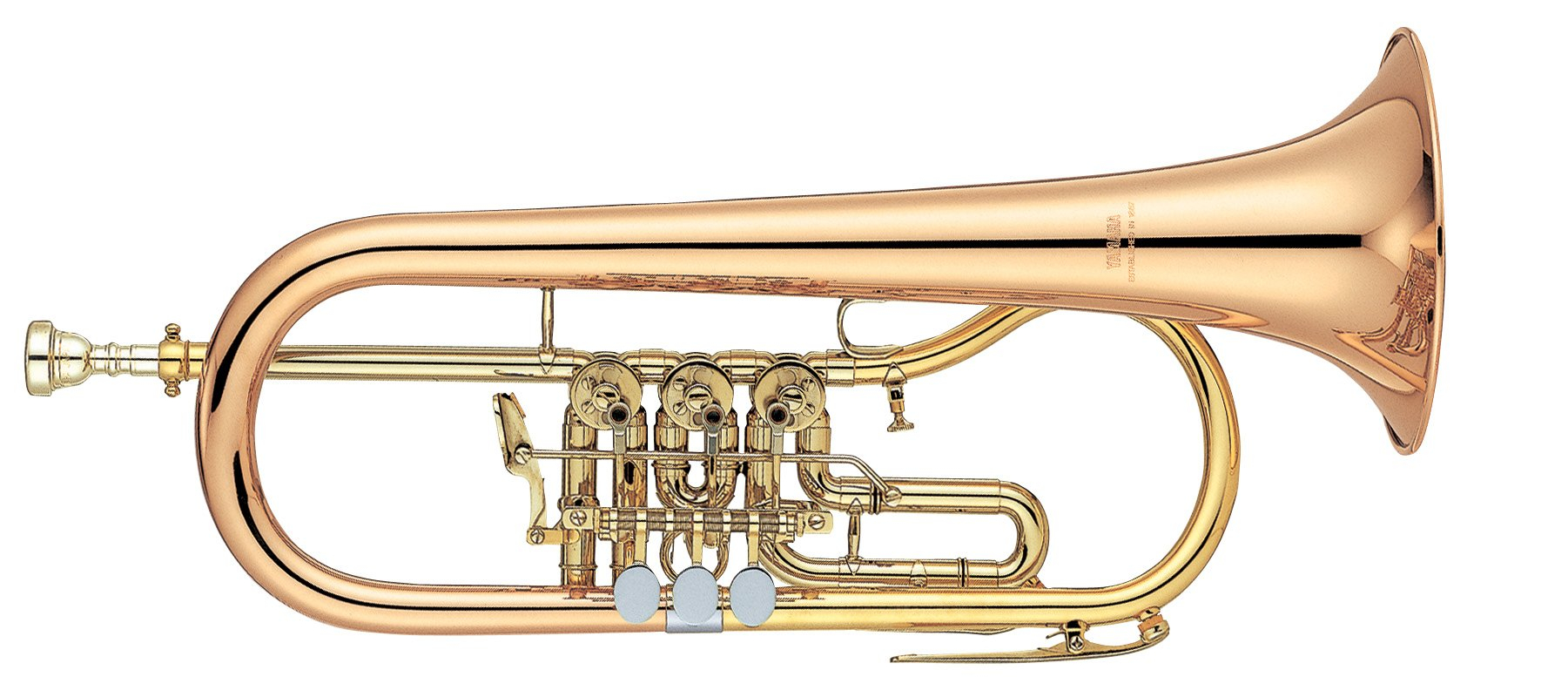
Modern flugelhorns, with piston valves left, and rotary valves, right (Yamaha Corporation)

The modern flugelhorn is usually pitched in 4½-foot (4½′) B♭, like most trumpets and cornets, with three piston valves. It is also sometimes built in 4′ C. Instruments made with rotary valves are used in central and eastern Europe, and feature a "shepherd crook" shape in the first tubing bend, retained from the earliest Prussian cornets and valved bugles.

The internal profile of a flugelhorn mouthpiece is more deeply funnel-shaped than trumpet and cornet mouthpieces, which are shaped more like a cup, but less conical than a horn mouthpiece.

Typical conical bore expansion and bell taper in a flugelhorn (1) compared to a trumpet (2)

The flugelhorn is mainly distinguished from both the cornet and trumpet by its wider conical bore, which undergoes conical expansion for a longer proportion of its tubing. The flugelhorn's cylindrical valves are mounted directly onto the leadpipe a short distance from the mouthpiece receiver, leaving a much longer proportion of its length after the valves to gradually expand into the bell flare. On the trumpet and cornet, the leadpipe is much longer, and the valves are mounted after the first bow, resulting in a higher proportion of cylindrical bore tubing.

=== Variants ===
Some flugelhorns are built with a fourth valve that lowers the pitch by a perfect fourth, like the fourth valve often found on euphoniums, tubas, and piccolo trumpets. This adds a useful low range that, coupled with the flugelhorn's darker sound, extends the instrument's capabilities. At least one manufacturer makes a four-valve flugelhorn where the fourth valve is instead tuned to a quarter tone, enabling the playing of microtonality and other extended techniques.

The flumpet, designed by the trumpet builder David Monette in 1989 for the jazz musician Art Farmer, combines the sound qualities of the flugelhorn with the construction of the trumpet. A bass flugelhorn in 8′ C, called a fiscorn, is used in pairs in the cobla bands of Catalonia that provide music for sardana dancers.

== Performance ==
The valves give the flugelhorn the same facility and agility as the cornet or trumpet. It employs the same fingering, and its similarity in size means it can be played by trumpet and cornet players, with some adjustment to breath and embouchure. Its upper range can be more difficult to articulate clearly and with correct intonation compared to the trumpet, due to the wider bore and more free-flowing mouthpiece. On brass instruments with wide conical bores such as the flugelhorn, notes above the bell cutoff frequency around the tenth harmonic become more difficult to center and continuous glissandi are possible, making valve fingering largely redundant.

=== Timbre ===
Flugelhorn

Trumpet

The same musical excerpt played on a flugelhorn and trumpet

The timbre of the flugelhorn is softer than the trumpet or cornet. Its wide conical bore dampens the higher frequency partials in the sound to produce a mellow, more rounded tone quality compared to instruments with a cylindrical bore at the same pitch. The sound of the flugelhorn has been described as halfway between a trumpet and a horn, whereas the cornet's sound is halfway between a trumpet and a flugelhorn.

=== In ensembles ===
The flugelhorn is used frequently in jazz and popular music. Flugelhorns have occasionally been used as the alto or low soprano voice in North American drum and bugle corps, and a single flugelhorn is also standard in the British brass band. The British film Brassed Off (1996) features a flugelhorn performance of the Adagio from Rodrigo's Concierto de Aranjuez as a pivotal plot device. The solo was played by Paul Hughes.

The flugelhorn is found in the Dutch and Belgian Fanfareorkesten (lit. 'fanfare orchestras'), where it has a significant role. They are pitched in B♭ and occasionally add an E♭ solo part, although it is often played on a soprano cornet.

=== Notable players ===
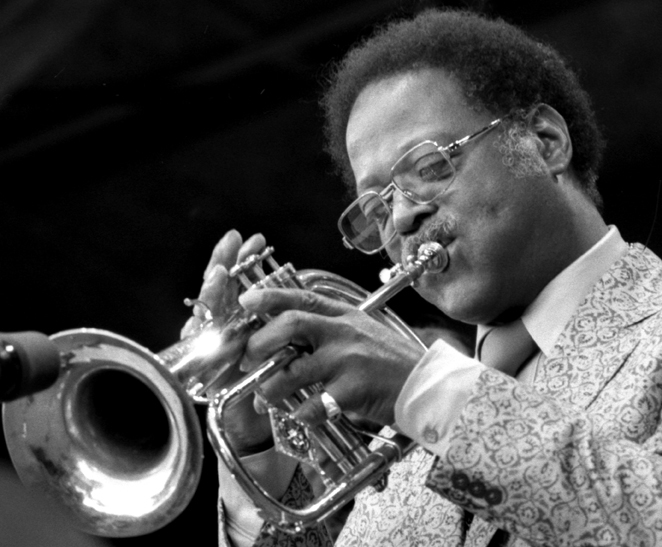
Shorty Rogers (1924–1994) and Clark Terry (1920–2015) adopted flugelhorn in jazz in the 1950s

As a member of the Woody Herman band in 1936, Joe Bishop was one of the earliest jazz musicians to use the flugelhorn. Shorty Rogers and Kenny Baker began playing it in the early 1950s, and Clark Terry used it in Duke Ellington's orchestra in the mid-1950s. Miles Davis further popularized the instrument in jazz on his early albums Miles Ahead (1957) and Sketches of Spain (1960), both arranged by Gil Evans. Chet Baker recorded several albums on the instrument in the 1950s and 1960s.

The American bebop trumpeter Marvin Stamm performed the flugelhorn solos on the song "Uncle Albert/Admiral Halsey" from Paul McCartney's album Ram (1971). While most jazz flugelhorn players used the instrument as an auxiliary to the trumpet, in the 1970s Chuck Mangione gave up playing the trumpet and concentrated on the flugelhorn alone, notably on the title song from his jazz-pop album Feels So Good (1977).

In popular music, other notable flugelhorn players include Rick Braun, Mic Gillette, Jeff Oster, Scott Spillane, Terry Kirkman, and Rashawn Ross. The British-Bahraini musician Yazz Ahmed commissioned a quarter-tone flugelhorn to explore Arabic influences on her album La Saboteuse (2017) which received wide critical acclaim, including "Jazz Album of the Year" in the British music magazine The Wire.

== Repertoire ==
The flugelhorn appears occasionally in orchestral music. Igor Stravinsky's Threni (1957) and Ralph Vaughan Williams's Symphony No. 9 (1958) include flugelhorn; both composers were inspired by hearing contemporary players. Michael Tippett's Symphony No. 3 (1972) also includes a flugelhorn part. The flugelhorn is sometimes used for modern performances of the post horn solo in Gustav Mahler's Symphony No. 3 (1898). The flugelhorn is also used for the soprano flicorni called for in the fourth movement of Ottorino Respighi's Pini di Roma (1924), intended to be played on replicas of the buccine from Ancient Rome.

Contemporary chamber and solo works for trumpet sometimes require the player to double on flugelhorn. Notable examples include trumpet concertos by Tim Souster (1988) and H. K. Gruber (Busking, 2007).

== Bibliography ==
- Adler-McKean, Jack (2020). The Techniques of Tuba Playing (in multiple languages). Kassel: Bärenreiter. ISBN 978-3-7618-2421-4. OCLC 1201192145. Wikidata Q134349391.
- Baines, Anthony (1976). Brass Instruments: Their History and Development. London: Faber & Faber. ISBN 0-571-10600-5. OL 4955460M. Wikidata Q125474545.
- Baines, Anthony; Herbert, Trevor (2001). "Flugelhorn". Grove Music Online (8th ed.). Oxford University Press. doi:10.1093/gmo/9781561592630.article.09887. ISBN 978-1-56159-263-0. (subscription, Wikilibrary access, or UK public library membership required)
- Dudgeon, Ralph T. (2004). Das Flügelhorn: die Geschichte des Flügelhorns, illustriert am Beispiel der Sammlung Streitwieser im Musikinstrumentenmuseum Schloss Kremsegg (in English and German). Translated by Streitwieser, Franz X. Bergkirchen: Edition Bochinsky. ISBN 978-3-932275-83-8. Wikidata Q139677729.
- Forsyth, Cecil (1914), Orchestration, London: Macmillan Publishers, LCCN a14002863, OCLC 408500, OL 177040M, Wikidata Q121879329
- Herbert, Trevor; Myers, Arnold; Wallace, John, eds. (2019). The Cambridge Encyclopedia of Brass Instruments. Cambridge University Press. doi:10.1017/9781316841273. ISBN 978-1-316-63185-0. OL 34730943M. Wikidata Q136027509.
- Klaus, Sabine Katharina (2013). Ways to Expand the Harmonic Series. Trumpets and Other High Brass. Vol. 2. Vermillion: National Music Museum. ISBN 978-0-9848269-2-6. Wikidata Q116447957.
- Klaus, Sabine Katharina (2017). Valves Evolve. Trumpets and Other High Brass. Vol. 3. Vermillion: National Music Museum. ISBN 978-0-9848269-5-7. OL 26416925M. Wikidata Q116447974.
- Koehler, Elisa (2014). Fanfares and Finesse: A Performer's Guide to Trumpet History and Literature. Bloomington: Indiana University Press. ISBN 978-0-253-01179-4. JSTOR 10.2307/j.ctt16gzc9v. Wikidata Q136110383.
- Lasocki, David (2009). "New Light on the Early History of the Keyed Bugle Part I: The Astor Advertisement and Collins v. Green". Historic Brass Society Journal. 21: 10–55. Archived from the original on 5 December 2022.
- Yurochko, Bob (1993). A Short History of Jazz. Chicago: Nelson-Hall. ISBN 978-0-8304-1331-7. OCLC 25245818. Wikidata Q139677644.
