= Fiscorn =

Musical instrument

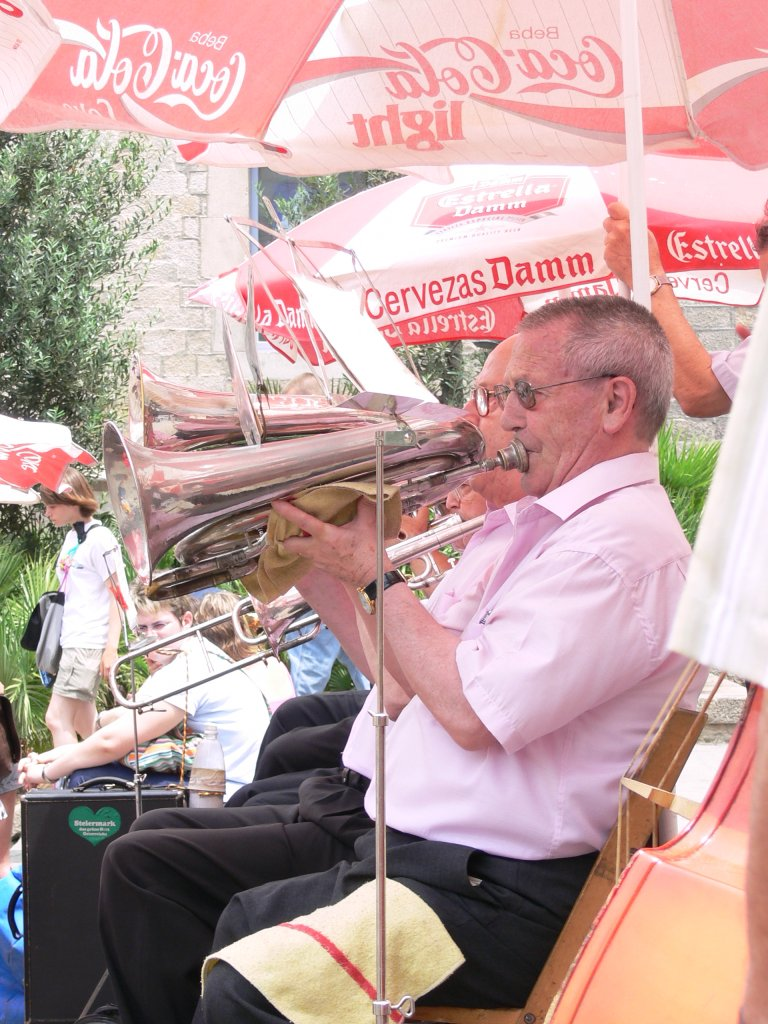
A fiscornaire of the Cobla Popular playing in front of a Barcelona cathedral

A fiscorn (Catalan pronunciation: [fisˈkɔɾn]) is a brass instrument. It is a bass flugelhorn in the key of C. In the cobla, it has the deepest sound among the brass instruments.

== Background ==
Originally played in polka bands throughout Germany and the former Czechoslovakia, as well as in military bands in Italy, the instrument has migrated to find its home today in Catalonia. Favored over other valved low brass for its haunting mellow tone and bell front projection, the fiscorn quickly became an essential instrument of the cobla band, along with the tenora, tible and flabiol. While the instrument has been dropped from most music ensembles for intonational concerns, the instrument's powerful baritone voice has no counterpart, (save perhaps the piston-valved marching baritone), in the organology. The forward-projected sound makes a pair of fiscorns the most suitable two instruments to join the shrill Catalan shawms (tenoras and tibles) and flabiol pipe, together with trumpets and trombone in the outdoor town-square setting where the cobla bands play for sardana dancers.

== Musicians ==
While the instrument is often played by trombonists, its conical nature is easily mastered by tuba or euphonium players. Several instrument manufacturers have attempted to solve the intonational discrepancies of the instrument in recent years, with a varied success. The instrument is taught throughout Catalonia, most notably in the traditional music departments of the Catalonia College of Music (ESMUC) in Barcelona and at the Conservatoire à rayonnement régional (CRR) in Perpignan, France.
