= Liberation Music (disambiguation) =

Liberation Music is an independent Australasian record company.

Liberation Music may also refer to:

- Liberation Music Orchestra, a large jazz ensemble headed by bassist Charlie Haden featuring arrangements by Carla Bley
- Liberation Music Orchestra (album), the 1969 eponymous debut album of Charlie Haden's Liberation Music Orchestra
- Liberation Records, a Southern California record company
