= Faixa =

Clothing accessory

The faixa (Catalan pronunciation: [ˈfa.ʃə] (central), [ˈfaj.ʃa] (Valencia), plural faixes) is a traditional Catalan clothing accessory. It is a sash made of a long piece of cloth, worn around the waist and wrapped around several times. During the 19th century, farmers and artisans wore it to protect the lumbar area during work in the fields. The bourgeois used to wear it as a sign of power, with different colours and 3 meters long. Nowadays, it is present in many traditional dances and festivals. This garment was common in Catalan and Occitan areas.

== Catalan traditional uses ==
In Catalonia the faixa is worn for many traditional dances and spectacles:

- Castellers: The faixa is an essential part of the castellers' uniform. It is almost always black (those visiting or just joining a colla may be lent a red faixa so others know to make allowance for their inexperience), with different lengths and widths, depending on the wearer's age, height, weight, and function in the castell. It is worn tightly at the height of the kidneys, and it has two functions: to protect the lumbar region of the back against on the weight and movements of the structure, and to be used as a support point for other castellers when climbing up and down. Members of the colla who do not require a faixa for practical purposes (e.g. musicians, the cap de colla) may or may not wear one for symbolic reasons.
- Sardana: an optional clothing item for male sardanistes.
- Falcons: (Catalan version of the Czech sokol gymnastic demonstration sport) The faixa is used to differentiate the teams by coloring. It also serves to protect the lumbar region and to assist with the various figures.

== Gallery ==
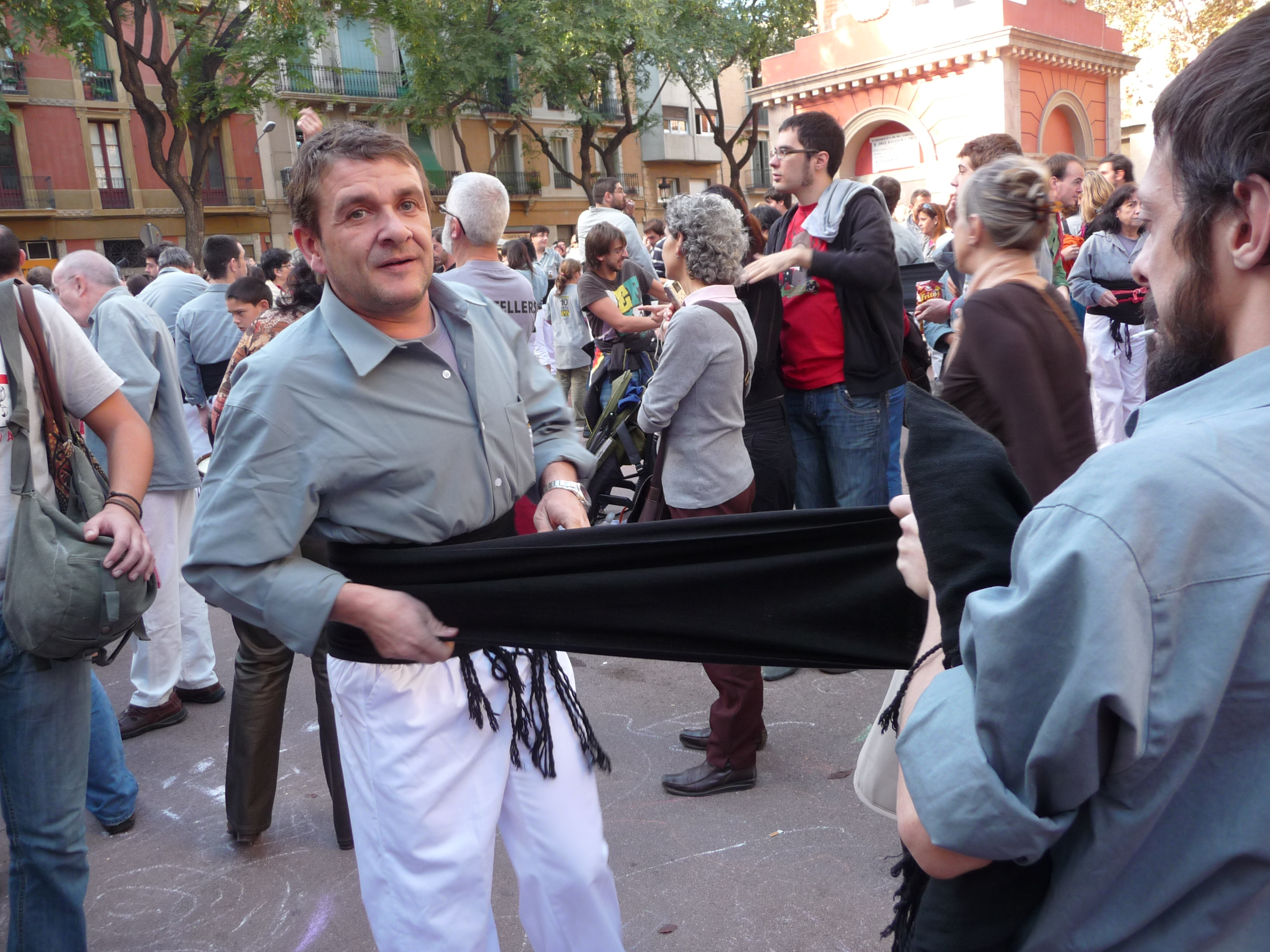
Casteller putting on a faixa (enfaixant-se)

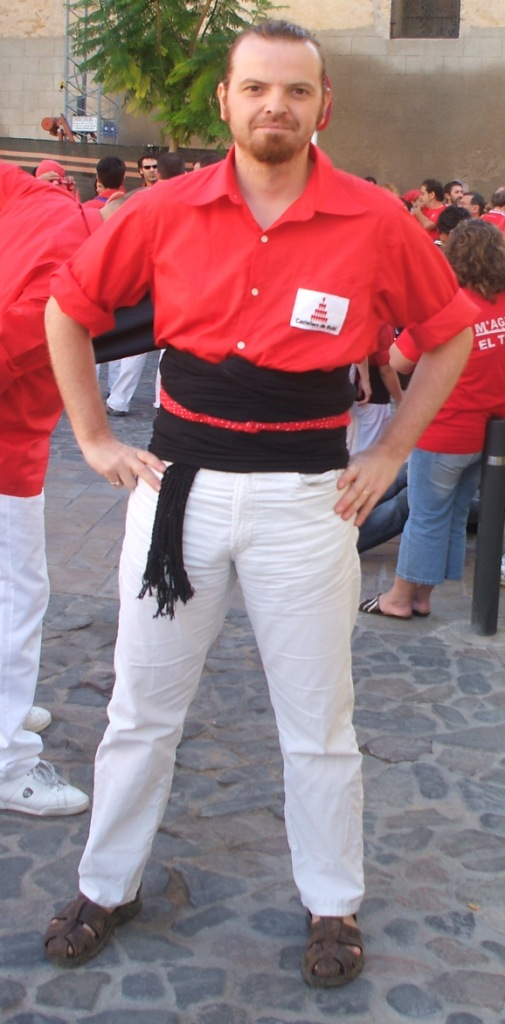
Casteller wearing a faixa

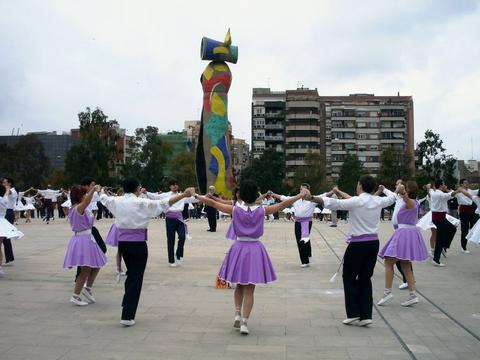
Sardanes

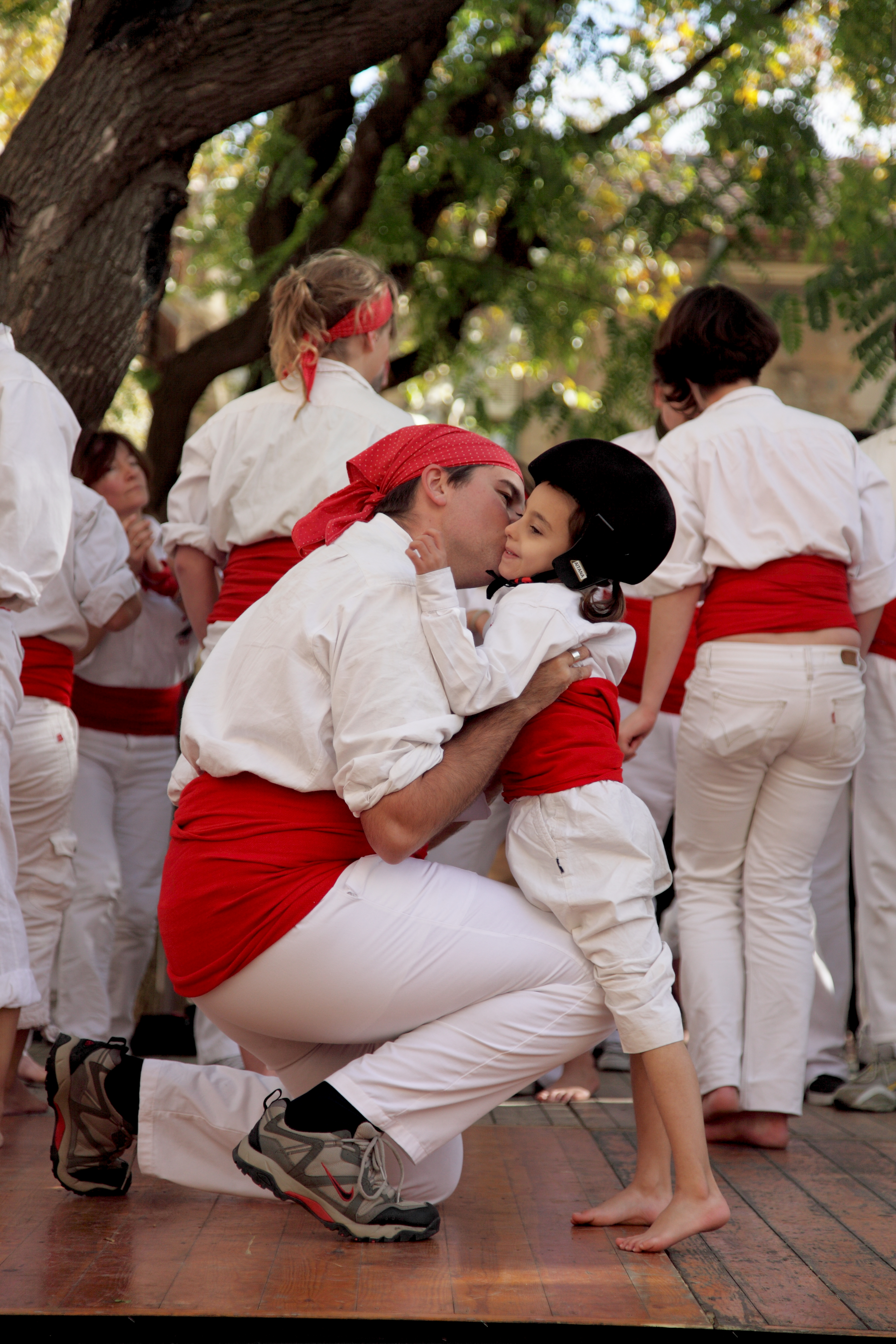
Falcons

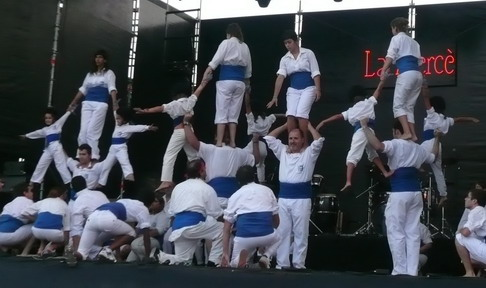
Falcons performing
