= Manuel Infante =

Spanish composer

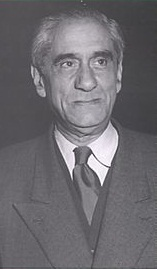
Portrait of Manuel Infante

Manuel Infante (July 29, 1883 – April 21, 1958) was a Spanish composer, long resident in France.

A native of Osuna, Infante studied piano and composition with Enric Morera, and settled in Paris in 1909. While there, he presented numerous concerts of Spanish music; a Spanish nationalist element is predominant in his own works. His most significant music was written for piano, and included 2 suites for two pianos. His works became popular through performances by his countryman José Iturbi, to whom many of them are dedicated.

Infante died in Paris on April 21, 1958.
