= Juli Garreta =

Spanish composer

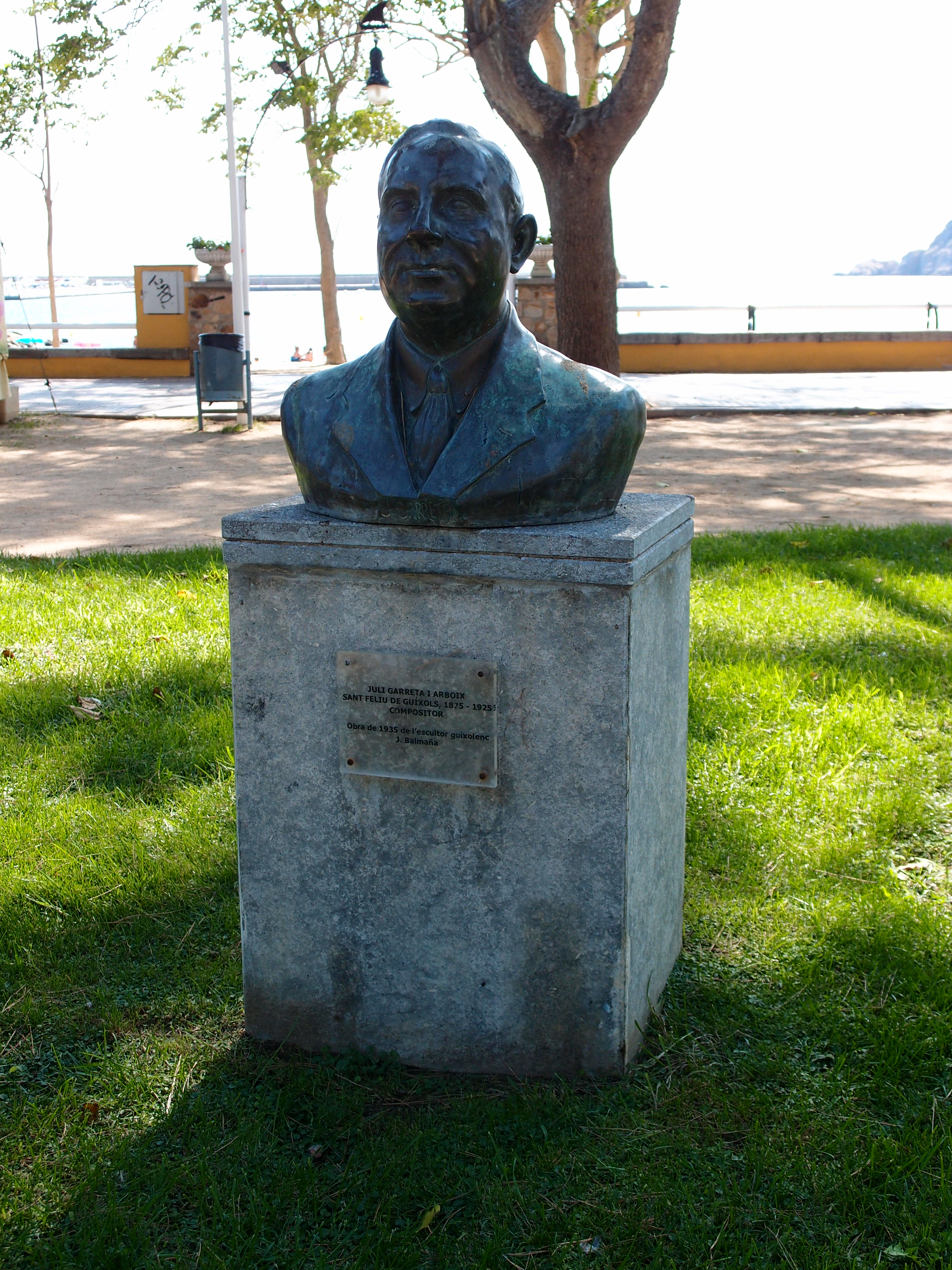

Juli Garreta i Arboix (12 March 1875, in Sant Feliu de Guíxols – 2 December 1925) was a Spanish composer, noted for his sardanes.

== Works, editions and recordings ==
- Records i somnis. on Jacint Verdaguer i el lied català. M. Teresa Garrigosa, soprano; Emili Blasco, piano La mà de Guido, 2005.
