= Enric Morera i Viura =

Spanish musician and composer

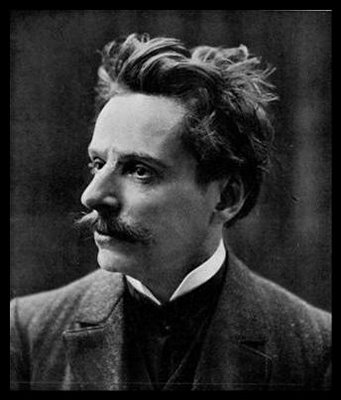
Enric Morera i Viura.

Enric Morera i Viura (Catalan pronunciation: [ənˈriɡ muˈɾeɾə]; 22 May 1865 – 11 March 1942) was a Catalan musician and composer from Spain.

== Career ==
Morera was born in Barcelona but moved with his father, a musician, to Buenos Aires, Argentina in 1867, studying organ, trumpet, and violin there. He returned in 1883 to Barcelona, studying with Isaac Albéniz and Felip Pedrell. Later he lived for two years in Brussels before returning to Argentina. He finally returned to Barcelona in 1890 where he was prominent in the movement Catalan Musical Modernism, with for example the opera La fada (The Fairy) in 1897. He founded the choir "Catalunya Nova". He wrote books on musical theory such as a "Practical Treatise on Harmony".

Among his students were Vicente Asencio, Agusti Grau, Manuel Infante, Xavier Montsalvatge and Carlos Surinach.

His music is generally strongly nationalist in character and forms part of the repertory of Catalan national compositions. He wrote more than 800 compositions, including songs, a requiem mass, lyric works, symphonic works, operas, symphonic poems, and sardanes for cobla.

Although he spent some time in Argentina and Belgium, Morera spent most of his life in Barcelona and died there in 1942.

The personal papers of Enric Morera are preserved in the Biblioteca de Catalunya.

== Selected compositions ==
- Dansa del gnoms, 1893
- Introducció a l'Atlántida, symphonic poem, 1893
- Minuet per a quartet de corda, 1889
- Jesús de Nazareth, 1894
- La fada, opera, 1897
- L'alegria que passa, 1898
- Missa de rèquiem, 1899
- La nit de l'amor, 1901
- El comte Arnau, 1905
- Bruniselda, 1906
- Empòrium, opera, 1906
- Don Joan de Serrallonga, 1907
- La Santa Espina, patriotic song and sardana, 1907
- Cançons populars catalanes harmonitzades, 1910
- Titaina, opera, 1912
- Tassarba, opera, 1916
- Concert per a violoncel i orquestra (cello concerto), 1917
- El poema de la nit i el dia i de la terra i de l'amor, symphonic poem, 1920
- Cançons de career, 1926
- La marieta de l'ullviu, 1926
- La cançó dels Catalans, 1930
- El castell dels tres dragons, 1931
- Dotze cançons del Llibre de la Pàtria, 1936

== See also ==
- Conservatori Superior de Música del Liceu
- Escola Municipal de Música
- Sardana

== Bibliography ==
- Aviñoa, Xosé: Morera (Barcelona: Nou Art Thor, 1985) (= Gent Nostra, vol. 37) (in Catalan)
- Morera, Enric: Moments viscuts (auto-biografia) (Barcelona: Gráficas Barcelona, 1936), (in Catalan)
- Pena, Joaquim: Enric Morera : assaig biogràfic (Barcelona: Institució del Teatre, 1937) (= Estudis Institut del Teatre, vol. 17) (in Catalan)
- Planes, Ramon: El mestre Morera i el seu món (Barcelona: Pòrtic, 1972) (= Llibre de butxaca, vol. 55), (in Catalan)
- Saperas, Miquel: El mestre Enric Morera (Andorra la Vella & Barcelona: Editorial Andorra, 1969) (= Collecció Ahir-Demà, vol. 4), (in Catalan)
