= Liberation Music Orchestra (album) =

Studio album by Charlie Haden
- Released: January 1970
- Recorded: April 27–29, 1969; Judson Hall, New York City
- Genre: Avant-garde jazz
- Length: 51:16
- Label: Impulse! AS-9183
- Producer: Bob Thiele

Charlie Haden chronology
Liberation Music Orchestra (1970)	Closeness (1976)

Liberation Music Orchestra chronology
Liberation Music Orchestra (1970)	The Ballad of the Fallen (1983)

Professional ratings
Review scores
Source	Rating
Allmusic	4.5/5 stars
DownBeat	4/5 stars
The Penguin Guide to Jazz Recordings	3.5/4 stars
The Rolling Stone Jazz Record Guide	5/5 stars
The Village Voice	C+

Liberation Music Orchestra is a band and jazz album by Charlie Haden released in 1970, Haden's first as a band leader.

== Background ==
The inspiration for the album came when Haden heard songs from the Spanish Civil War. He included three of those songs on the album (the trilogy "El Quinto Regimiento", "Los Cuatro Generales", and "Viva la Quince Brigada", which are old Spanish folk songs given new words during the war, in that order "El Vito", previously adapted by John Coltrane as “Olé", "Los Cuatro Muleros", for which Federico García Lorca also wrote lyrics, and "Ay Carmela").

Other tracks on the album include Ornette Coleman's "War Orphans", which Haden had played with Coleman in 1967, three pieces by Carla Bley, who also contributed much of the arranging, two of Haden's own compositions, one dedicated to Che Guevara and one inspired by the 1968 National Convention of the U.S. Democratic Party:

"After the minority plank on Vietnam was defeated in a vote taken on the convention floor, the California and New York delegations spontaneously began to sing 'We Shall Overcome' [the last track on the album] in protest. Unable to gain control of the floor, the rostrum instructed the convention orchestra to drown out the singing. 'You're a Grand Old Flag' and 'Happy Days Are Here Again' could then be heard trying to stifle 'We Shall Overcome'. To me this told the story, in music, of what was happening in our country politically." (Charlie Haden, original liner notes)

In "Circus '68 '69" the musicians are thus divided into two bands in recreation of the events on the convention floor.

The Liberation Music Orchestra's next album, The Ballad of the Fallen, didn't appear until 1983.

== Critical reception ==
Lester Bangs' Rolling Stone review stated, "The arrangements by Carla Bley are miracles of dynamics, rising and falling in volume and velocity and the awe-inspiring balance of collective ensembles improvising freely through swellings and contractions of individual voices entering and leaving the mysterious swirling circle of simultaneous songs as diverse as the number of performers yet never lacking in the kind of transporting telepathic unity that makes this multiplicity of musical lines such a far cry from the chaos of the charlatans in other sections of the avant-garde hiding under the mantle of these geniuses. An extremely tight, moving substantial record." Robert Christgau was less impressed in The Village Voice, regarding the album as merely "competent Jazz Composer’s Orchestra style ensemble jazz, full of nice dissonances and not much more".

== Track listing ==
LP side A:

1. "The Introduction" (Bley) / "Song of the United Front" (Bertolt Brecht, Hanns Eisler) – 3:07
2. "El Quinto Regimiento" ("The Fifth Regiment") (Traditional; arranged by Bley)
  "Los Cuatro Generales" ("The Four Generals") (Traditional; arranged by Bley)
  "Viva la Quince Brigada" ("Long Live the Fifteenth Brigade") (Traditional melody; words by Bart Van Derschelling) – 20:58
3. "The Ending to the First Side" (Bley) – 2:07

LP side B:

1. "Song for Ché" (Haden) – 9:29
2. "War Orphans" (Ornette Coleman) – 6:42
3. "The Interlude (Drinking Music)" (Bley) – 1:24
4. "Circus '68 '69" (Haden) – 6:10
5. "We Shall Overcome" (Zilphia Horton, Frank Hamilton, Guy Carawan, Pete Seeger) 1:19

== Personnel ==
- Perry Robinson — clarinet
- Gato Barbieri — tenor saxophone, clarinet
- Dewey Redman — alto saxophone, tenor saxophone
- Don Cherry — cornet, flute, Indian wood & bamboo flutes (3,5)
- Michael Mantler — trumpet
- Roswell Rudd — trombone
- Bob Northern — French horn, hand wood blocks, crow call, bells, military whistle
- Howard Johnson — tuba
- Sam Brown — guitar, Tanganyikan guitar, thumb piano
- Carla Bley — piano, tambourine
- Charlie Haden — bass
- Paul Motian — drums, percussion
- Andrew Cyrille — drums, percussion (8)
