= Tambori =

Catalan percussion instrument

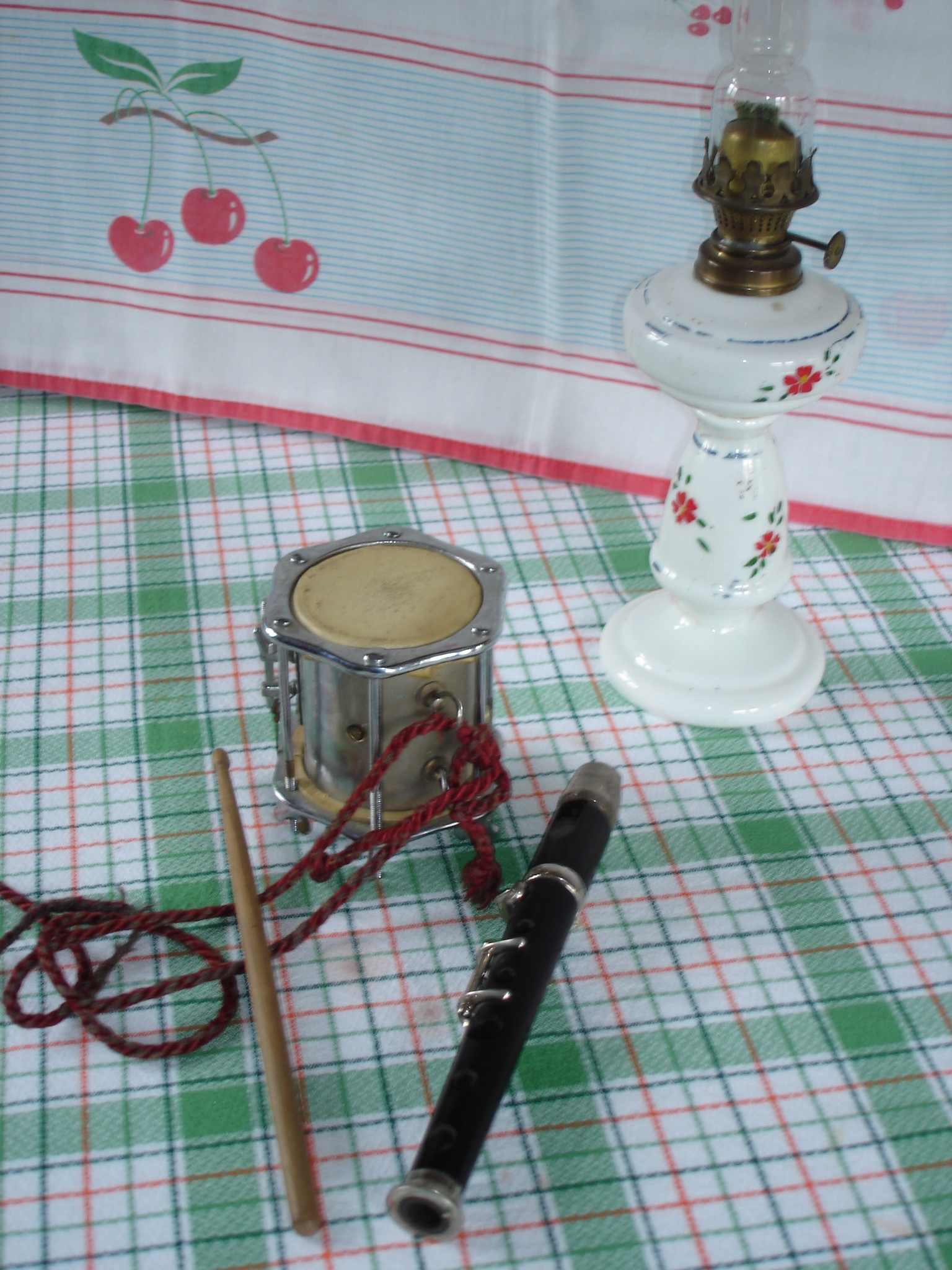
Tamborí and keyed flabiol

The tambori (Catalan: tamborí [təmbuˈɾi]) is a percussion instrument of about 10 centimetres diameter, a small shallow cylinder formed of metal or wood with a drumhead of skin. Its usual function is to accompany the playing of the flabiol in a cobla band, beating the rhythm of the sardana, the traditional dance of Catalonia.

It is attached to the elbow of the left arm and struck with a little drumstick called a broqueta held by the right hand, while the flabiol can be played at the same time with the left hand.

== See also ==
- Pipe and tabor
