= Sardana =

Catalan musical genre and cultural dance

The sardana (Catalan pronunciation: [səɾˈðanə]; plural sardanes in Catalan) is a Catalan musical genre typical of Catalan culture and danced in circle following a set of steps. The dance was originally from the Empordà region, but started gaining popularity throughout Catalonia from the late 19th century to beginning of the 20th century after the modernisation done by Josep Maria Ventura i Casas.

Men and women join together in a circle by holding hands and facing inwards to dance either the historical sardana curta (with an approximate duration of 5 minutes) or the present-day sardana llarga (with a duration of approximately 12–13 minutes). Other more unusual sardanes are the sardana de lluïment and the sardana revessa.

The steps are meticulously counted as two- or three-step movements taken sideways within the circle. The direction of the steps is alternated. The hands stay on the hip or shoulder level depending on the step structure. The pattern of the choreography has jumping intervals changing with the music. Usually there is more than one circle with varying tempo and levels of dance knowledge.

The participants are called sardanistes. Professional dancers organise themselves in colles sardanistes, colla meaning group or club. All colles are united under the Confederació Sardanista de Catalunya.

Sardana is mainly danced during festivities and on weekends. Sardanes danced during a festival are termed aplecs. Brief public dances are known as ballades. The accompanying orchestra of 11 people, a cobla, includes 10 wind instruments and a bass. One person plays the flabiol (a flute) and the tambori (a small hand drum). Since the 1980s female musicians are also allowed in the cobles.

This dance stands out from others because it allows people to join a public dance circle at any time, for anyone of any age and background who is familiar with the sardana can drop their coat and bag in the centre of the circle and join in. It is emphasised by sardanistes as the specialty of the sardana.

== History ==
The origin of the Sardana is unknown. However the dance is very similar to the folks music danced in the island of Sardinia associated with the Shardana people. The oldest found reference to the word Sardana is from 1552. From the 16th century to the 19th century a folk dance known as sardana propagated around the territory of the present province of Girona. The sardana was a popular dance in Empordà, Rosselló and Garrotxa at the middle of the 19th century. Sardana llarga fits the prototype of invented traditions common in the Industrial Revolution. It is believed that the invented traditions are a way to stabilize cultural anchors in a time of rapid socioeconomic or political change. The modern sardana was created in the context of the Renaixença period, in which some people wanted to relate the Sardana with dances of Ancient Greek origin, with the purpose of linking Classical antiquity with old Empúries while taking advantage of the rising popularity of the modern sardana in Empordà. This imagined account is the legendary origin of the dance. The invention served to symbolize the distinct Catalan ethos promoted by the then-newborn Catalan nationalism. In fact, today Catalans are known for their musicality throughout Spain and much of Western Europe; sardana has emerged as a major source of personal and social identity.

Ignoring the myth, the creation of sardana llarga or its evolution was driven by three people: Andreu Toron, Miquel Pardàs, and Josep Maria Ventura (Pep Ventura). Andreu Toron was responsible for introducing a type of oboe-tenor known in Catalonia as the tenora. This happened in 1849 at Perpignan. In parallel, influences to the music composition of sardana llarga include the popular Italian and German operas of the time as well as Contrapàs, a Catalan dance which in religious celebrations preceded sardana curta. These influences evolved into sardanes (plural of sardana) of different lengths. As a consequence, people started counting steps in order to finish at the same time. Shorter choreographies could be accommodated in longer melodies. The new melodies which progressively were made popular required new instruments, increasing the size of the cobla. Similar to what happened with the Catalan language when in 1891 Pompeu Fabra published his grammar, the different sardanes were standardised into what today is known as sardana llarga. Choreography was updated with slight differences from the original North-Catalan dance. Pep Ventura is credited for stabilizing the different variants around a clear 6/8 rhythm and making the instrumental ensemble of a fixed size. He included the today's standard long steps (els llargs) and the eleven player cobla band. Though some Iberian and Mediterranean circle dances follow similar patterns, instrumental music for the sardana has achieved a complexity of its own.

In 1850 Miquel Pardàs publishes Método per aprender á ballar sardanas llargas ('Method to learn how to dance sardana llarga').

By 1860 the dance was popular in Barcelona and from there it disseminated through Catalan towns and villages. Between 1840 and 1860 the sardana was established as "dance of the Catalans". Its influence was extended throughout the 20th century thanks to the dance group Obra del Ballet Popular, which organised aplecs and other sardana events in communities where it was previously unknown.

In 1924, during the dictatorship of Miguel Primo de Rivera, the civil governor of Barcelona banned the patriotic sardana La Santa Espina, seen as being Catalanist. This fact increased the identification of the sardana with Catalanism. The creation of associations and cobles grew dramatically thanks to the continuous attack from the Establishment and Lerrouxism.

Sardana was temporally prohibited in the 1940s in Francoist Spain because it was considered to foment false feelings of pride and superiority among the Catalans. The prohibition was made on certain locales in and around Barcelona. Nevertheless, sardana was considered relatively innocuous in Spain and this allowed the use of sardana as a peaceful protest against the more effective and oppressive campaign to eliminate the public use of the Catalan language. Even more, pro-Franco Catalans continued to dance sardana throughout the Franco period.

Since the 1960, the Obra de Ballet Popular travels from one city to another with the Flama de la Sardana ('Eternal light of the Sardana'). Each city is named "Heir to the Sardana" for the year in which it conserves the Eternal Light.

In the year 2010, the Government of Catalonia added the sardana to the Catàleg del Patrimoni Festiu de Catalunya ('Catalonia's festivities heritage catalogue') and declared it a festivity of national interest.

In 2015 the Spanish parliament approved unanimously an initiative of the People's Party of Spain to urge the Spanish Government to promote sardana for inclusion in the UNESCO Intangible Cultural Heritage. The same vote was done in 2002 in Spain's senate and was rejected due to the negative vote of People's Party of Spain.

== Sardana and Catalan identity ==
The dance became a national symbol because it is identified with the core Catalan values including harmony, brotherhood, and democracy. People of all classes, ages, genres and origins are encouraged to dance sardana together. It is hard to believe this dance had emerged without expressing qualities appreciated by Catalans. The sardana is considered by Catalans one of the most prominent elements of their culture and deserving to be defended against threats from outsiders. This view was greatly increased with the suppression of La Santa Espina in 1924 and the prohibition of sardana in 1940s Francoist Spain and its use as a protest mechanism. Fear of culture loss is notable among Catalans because they define themselves in cultural terms, so suppressing their culture is considered equivalent to annihilation as a people. This vexes and baffles Castilians and other Spaniards whose custom believes that birthplace and descent primarily define national identity. The tradition of Catalan people is that biology and culture are separable. Catalan ethnic identity can be acquired by learning, they do not consider it a biological or race matter. However, this concept of culture by acquisition represents also a fear of being consumed by the dominant Castilian culture. In the case of sardana, the rigidity of the dance rules and group exclusivity by those who follow the detailed rules is a handicap for inclusion. In sardana the dancers who do not follow the rules are excluded to their own circle until they master the technicalities.

Andalusian immigration in the 20th century introduced the Andalusian feria de abril and flamenco dancing. The dance was perceived by some as a manipulation by the Spanish state, to be used as an instrument of cultural domination. Ensuring that sardana prevailed was somehow seen as vital to Catalan culture survival. In fact, learning sardana can be considered a way of expressing solidarity with Catalans. A quote from Montserrat Roig's novel Molta roba i poc sabó ... i tan neta que la volen reads:

I know people in the government who are very well-intentioned and are able to participate in our way of life ... They're people of good faith who have danced Maragall [a great Catalan poet], who understand our language, and who send their children to spend the summer at the beaches of Girona.

— Montserrat Roig, Molta roba i poc sabó (1970)

The protagonist of the novel says this to defend Castilians who support Catalan culture. The sardana forms part of Catalan culture and as such has to be protected from possible incursions by the dominant Castilian culture. Failing to adopt Catalan culture might cause it to disappear, effectively annihilating Catalan people.

Another issue recently introduced by Spanish nationalism concerns the origins of the creator of the modern sardana (sardana llarga), Josep Maria Ventura i Casas. He was born in 1817 in Andalusia from Catalan parents, and when he was 2 years old he moved to Catalonia along with his father. Castilian custom would define Pep Ventura as Andalusian due to his birthplace. The attributed denial of Pep's Catalan identity is reflected in some Spanish press such as the digital "El Español". Historians and ethnomusicologists generally refer to Pep Ventura as Catalan due to his lineage (his parents were from the Catalan region of Empordà), the first language he spoke (Catalan) and his habitual residence. The attributes and values in which Catalan people are invested make the sardana of Catalan nature, and it express Catalan qualities. As a result, both sardana llarga and Pep Ventura have become symbols of national resistance against the power of Castile.

Nowadays sardana is considered too rigid and conservative. Only a few younger dancers care about learning sardana and dance. Still, the Catalan government continues to invest in dance schools and training. Its socio-political relevance has decreased but holds its symbolic value.

== Sardana band ==
Music for the sardana is played by a cobla, a band consisting of 10 wind instruments, double bass and a tamborí (little drum) played by 11 musicians. The cobla has five woodwind instruments: the flabiol which is a small fipple flute, and the tenora and tible (two of each) which belong to the oboe family. These and the tamborí are typical Catalan instruments. The brass instruments are: two trumpets, two fiscorns, and a trombone (usually a valve trombone). The double bass was traditionally a three-stringed one, but now the part is usually written for and played on the modern four-stringed instrument.

In Catalonia, about one hundred and thirty cobles are active, most of which are amateur bands. Outside Catalonia, there is at least one more cobla: Cobla La Principal d'Amsterdam.

== Sardana dance ==
Sardana in the Plaça Sant Jaume in Barcelona

The music written for the dance is a sardana (plural: sardanes), and is usually in two sections (tirades), called curts and llargs, each of which may be repeated in various ways to form the pattern for the complete dance. There is usually an experienced dancer leading the circle. The dancers hold hands throughout the dance: arms down during the curts and raised to shoulder height during the llargs.

- The introit is a few introductory notes played freely by the flabiolist, typically ending with an upward scale and a tap of the tamborí, signalling the other players and dancers to begin the curts.
- The first tirada played by the band, called the tirada de curts ("short steps"), is of length between 20 and 50 measures and has a two-measure pattern. The tempo is typically about =112 to 120, in 2/4 and/or 6/8 rhythm. It is danced with the arms down: (point-step-step-cross) to the right followed by (point-step-step-cross) to the left. The curts is usually repeated the first time it is played.
- The tirada de llargs ("long steps") is of 50 to 100 measures and has a four-measure pattern. It is danced with the arms up to shoulder level, and is more lively than the curts. However the tempo is typically slower than the curts, about =100 to 108, with long lyrical tunes accompanied by variants of a dactyl rhythm. The llargs is usually repeated the first time it is played.
- The contrapunt is played by the flabiolist, and is a two-measure break signalling the last repeat of the llargs.
- The cop final ("final beat") concludes the dance with a unified movement from all the dancers, still holding hands.
- A modern sardana dance has the following typical pattern, which shows all the repeats of the curts and llargs:
1. introit
2. 1st tirada: curts
3. 2nd tirada: curts
4. 3rd tirada: llargs
5. 4th tirada: llargs
6. 5th tirada: curts
7. 6th tirada: llargs
8. contrapunt
9. 7th tirada: llargs
10. cop final

The number of measures in the curts and llargs, called the tiratge or "run", is important to the players, and may be indicated before the start of the dance (e.g. a "run" shown as 25x79 indicates 25 measures of curts and 79 measures of llargs) in order to terminate the tirada correctly with the correct foot, though a method commonly used is to count the measures in the first tirada and not dance until the second has begun.

A dancer is called a sardanista (plural: sardanistes).

As a relatively slow, non-performance dance, the sardana does not require special fitness. The dance circle can be opened to a highly variable number of dancers. When danced in the streets and town squares, small circles of dancers can be seen to form and grow: these are open circles called rotllanes obertes, and passers-by can join, leaving their bags in the center of the circle. When a dance circle is too big it may split into smaller circles. The dancers are alternate men and women – with the man's partner on his right – and care must be taken by those joining not to split partners. Another kind of circle may be formed by members of organised sardana clubs called colles, and each colla may wear its own costume.

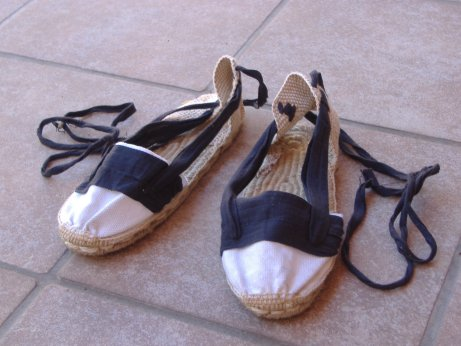
Espardenya: traditional shoes used to dance sardanes

In order to dance sardanes comfortably the footwear must be flexible enough to allow the dancer to jump slightly when the llargs come. Traditionally sardanistes wear special dancing shoes called espardenyes made of esparto grass fabric and with two long fabric strips to tie them up around the ankle. Nowadays most people have replaced these with regular trainers.

Many sardanes have sung versions, but mostly instrumental versions are used for dancing. Recordings of sardanes or sardanes played in concert usually contain the introit, two curts and two llargs. Sardanes may be recorded for dancing, having all the entrades in order. Often sardanes are written for special occasions or to commemorate people.

== Composers of sardanes ==
- Josep Maria "Pep" Ventura (1819–1875)
- Enric Morera i Viura (1865–1942), composer of the most popular sardana La Santa Espina
- Joan Lamote de Grignon i Bocquet (1872–1949)
- Josep Serra i Bonal (1874–1939)
- Juli Garreta i Arboix (1875–1925)
- Vicenç Bou i Geli (1885–1962)
- Eduard Toldrà i Soler (1895–1962)
- Roberto Gerhard (1896–1970)
- Ricard Lamote de Grignon i Ribas (1899–1962), son of Joan Lamote de Grignon
- Francesc Mas i Ros (1901–1985)
- Joaquim Serra i Corominas (1907–1957), son of Josep Serra i Bonal
- Pere Buxó i Domènech, (born Amer, Girona, 13 November 1916 – died Girona, 30 December 1998)
- Josep Maria Mestre Miret (1918–2002), winner of two sardana awards
- Pepita Llunell i Sanahuja (1926-2015), singer and actress, winner of the Creu de Sant Jordi
- Joan Gibert Canyadell (Joan Gibert i Canyadell; born 1941)
- Joan Lluís Moraleda i Perxachs (born 1943)

== See also ==
- Armenian dance
- Assyrian folk dance
- Ballu tundu
- Catalan shawms, discussing the tenora and tible
- La Sardana de l'alcalde
- Faroese dance
- Kurdish dance
- Turkish dance
