= Flabiol =

Musical instrument

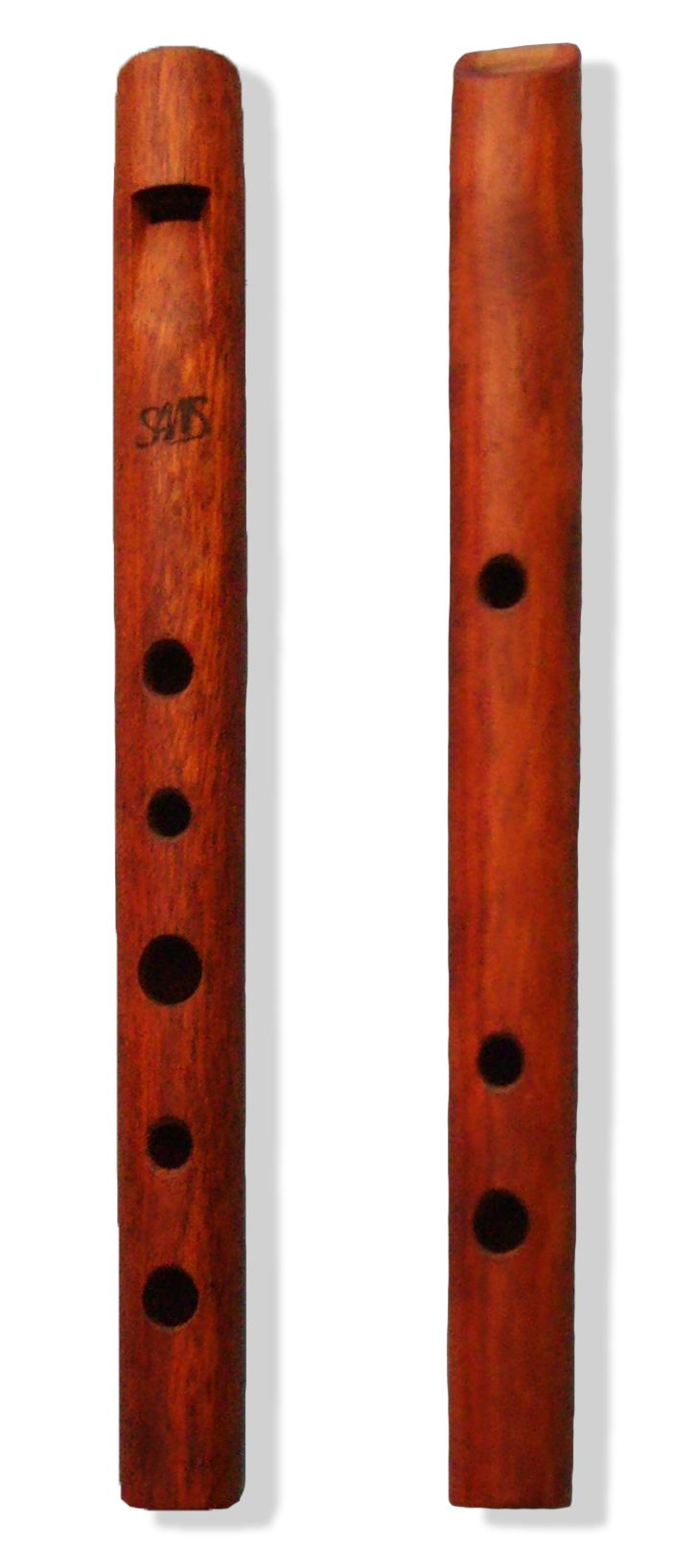
- Flabiol of bubinga wood, top side (left) and bottom side.

Woodwind instrument

Playing range
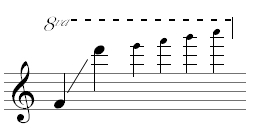

The flabiol (Catalan pronunciation: [fləβiˈɔl]) is a Catalan woodwind musical instrument of the family known as fipple flutes. It is one of the 12 instruments of the cobla. The flabiol measures about 25 centimeters in length and has five or six holes on its front face and three underneath.

== Overview ==
The two main types are the dry flabiol without keys, usually made of a hardwood such as bubinga, and the keyed flabiol, used in coblas for sardana dances and in other folk music ensembles.

The flabiol is normally played by the left hand while the player uses the right hand to beat a small drum (called tamborí) attached to the left elbow.

All sardanes played by a cobla begin with a short introduction (introit) from the flabiol which is terminated by a single tap of the tamborí.

Its traditional geographic zone extends from the south of Catalonia to the Roussillon area of France, and from the Eastern strip of Aragon to the Balearic Islands, where it is used as solo instrument with its own melodies.

Apart from being in the cobla for the performance of sardanes, the flabiol is also found in the reduced version of the cobla known as cobla of three quarters formed of one tarota or tible, a flabiol and a sac de gemecs (bagpipes).

A specific type of flabiol is the flabiol de gralla. This is a flabiol made to be played with the same fingering as the gralla, an instrument used in traditional music such as that played during castells performances. This is helpful for children and others as it is easier to play than the gralla, helping them learn skills that can be transferred to the gralla later. It is also useful for gralla players to practise at home or otherwise indoors where the loud sound of the gralla would disturb others.

== Flabiol fingering ==
The flabiol is a transposing instrument in the key of F, and the played notes sound an eleventh (octave and a perfect fourth) higher than those written. The Flabiol requires special playing skill, because it is generally played only with the left hand, using the thumb and the first three fingers, with the little finger able to play a tone hole under the instrument and providing the required stability. The four holes at the lower end are used as vent holes and for tuning with wax plugs. If any of the four lowest semitones are required, the thumb and one or two fingers of the right hand have to be used. Keyed versions have the key pads between the top 3 toneholes for fast play. The Flabiol is the original model for the modern Tonette or Flutophone, popular with school children.

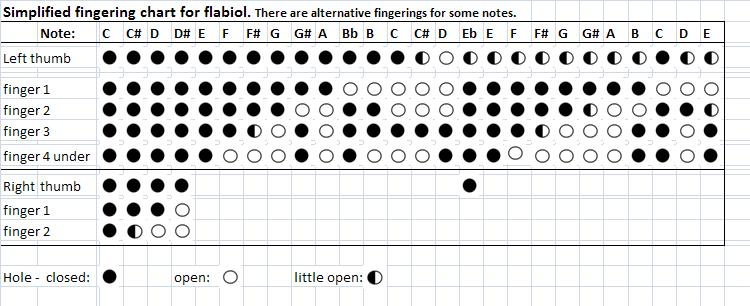
Fingering chart

== See also ==
- Pipe and tabor
