= Sanjosex =

Spanish musician; architect (born 1977)

Carles Sanjosé
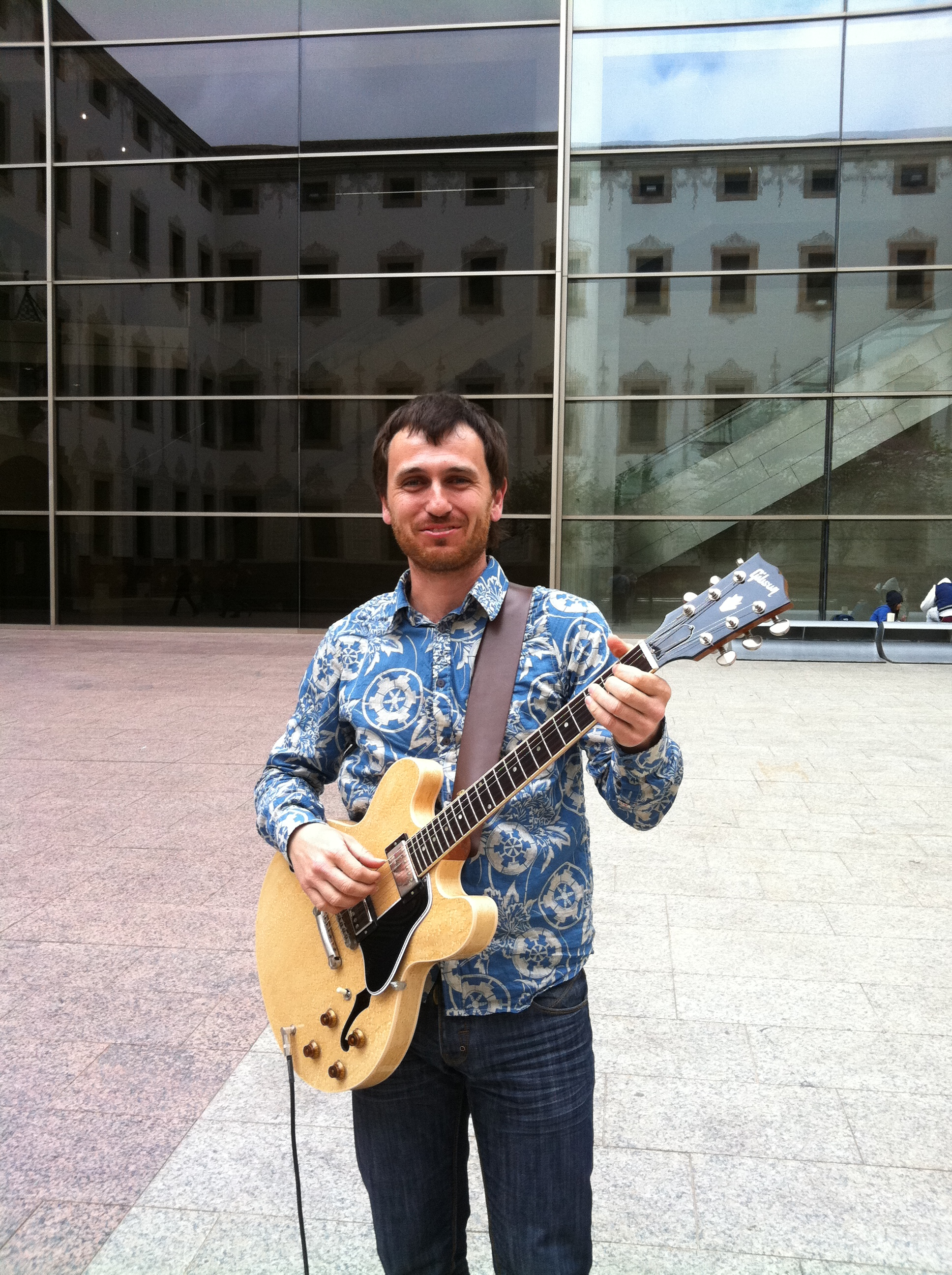
- Sanjosex in CCCB (Barcelona, Catalonia) (2012)

Background information
- Born: Carles Sanjosé; 1977 (age 48–49); La Bisbal d'Empordà, Catalonia, Spain
- Origin: Catalonia, Spain
- Occupations: Musician, Architect
- Years active: 2005–present
- Label: Bankrobber
- Members: Pep Mula, Miquel Sospedra, Juliane Heinemann

Carles Sanjosé, better known by his stage name Sanjosex (born 1977 in La Bisbal d'Empordà, Catalonia), is a Catalan musician and architect. In 2025, his band's members were Pep Mula (drums), Miquel Sospedra (bass) and Juliane Heinemann (guitar, keyboards, and backing vocals). Former members of the band include Richie Álvarez, Paco Jordi, Sisu Coromina, Toni Molina, Eduard Font, and Xarim Aresté.

== History ==
Sanjosex has released five studio albums, plus the live album La viu-viu: Sanjosex en concert. Several songs from these albums appeared in the TV3 series Porca misèria. He also performed the soundtrack for the final season of Ventdelplà.

The band has appeared at festivals such as Primavera Club, BAM, MMVV, popArb, Senglar Rock, and Altaveu, and at the Festival du Désert in Mali.

In 2012, Sanjosex toured with flamenco guitarist Chicuelo.

In 2020, Sanjosex released Dos Somnis, his first new material in six years.

From 2020 to 2023, Sanjosex revisited collaborative projects, including performances with Carles Belda during the Càntut tour.

== Discography ==
- Viva! (Bankrobber, 2005)
- Temps i rellotge (Bankrobber, 2007)
- Al marge d’un camí (Bankrobber, 2010)
- La viu-viu: Sanjosex en concert (Bankrobber, 2012)
- Festival (Bankrobber, 2014)
- Càntut (Bankrobber, 2016)
- Dos Somnis (Bankrobber, 2020)
