= Catalan shawm =

Type of shawm

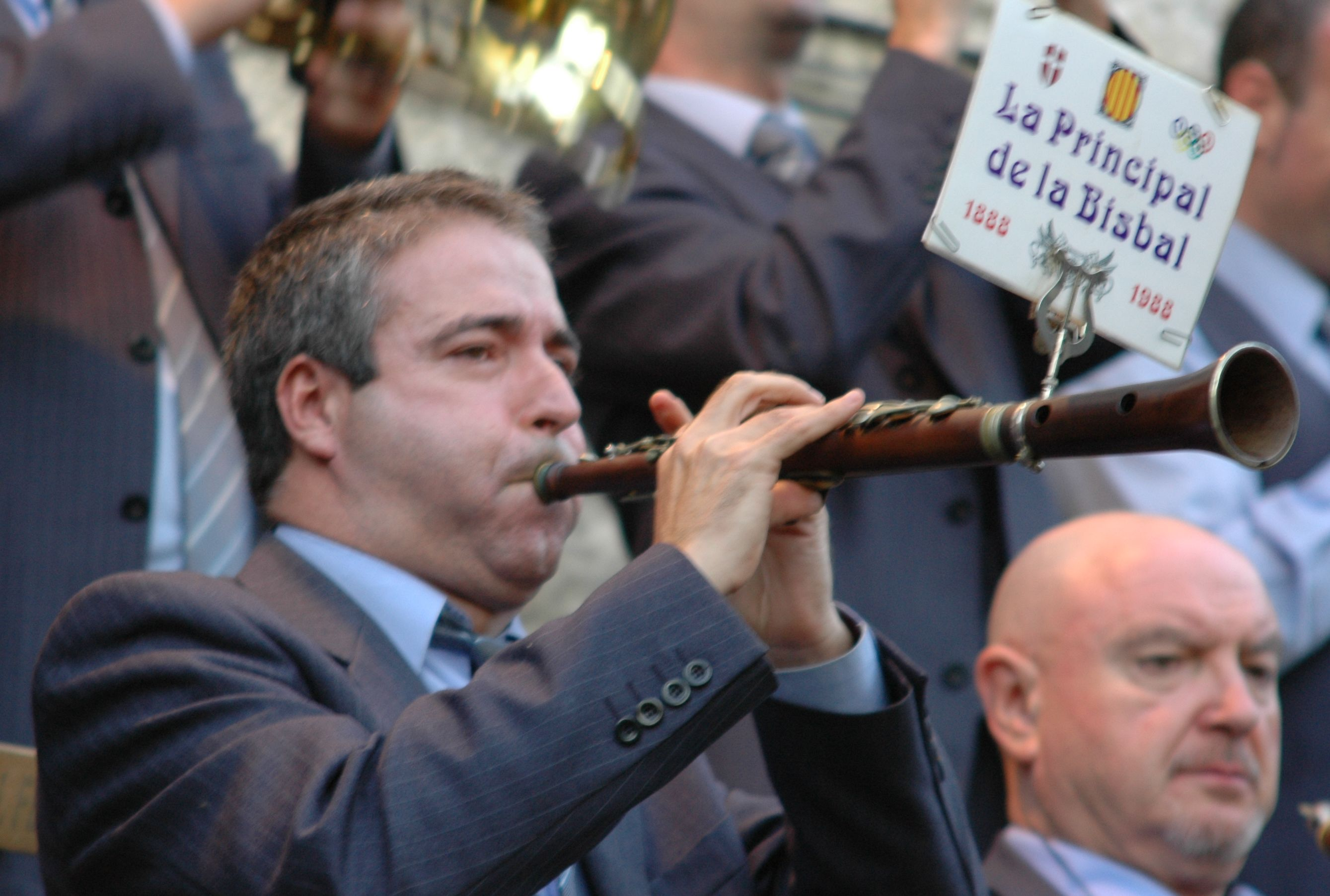
Catalan tible in the cobla La Principal de la Bisbal

In music, a Catalan shawm is one of two varieties of shawm, an oboe-like woodwind musical instrument played in Catalonia in northeastern Spain.

== Region, types, and uses ==
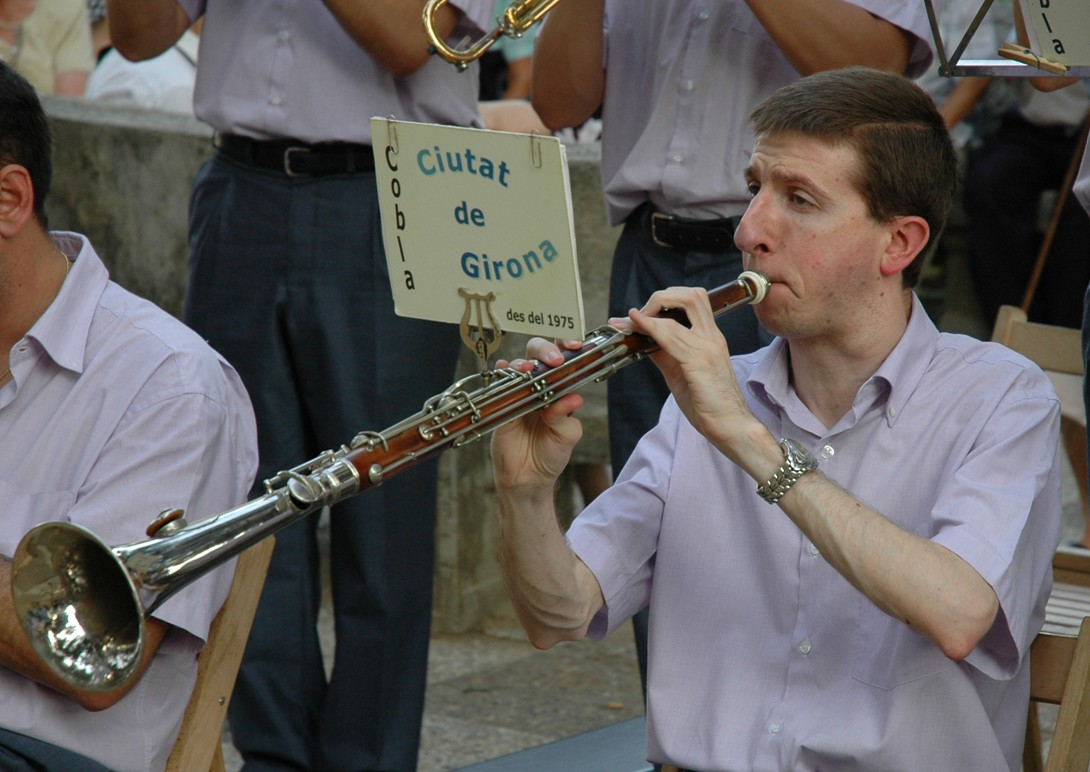
Catalan tenora in the cobla Ciutat de Girona

The types of shawm commonly used in Catalonia are the tible (pronounced [ˈtibːlə], Catalan for "treble") and the tenora (pronounced [təˈnoɾə], Catalan for "tenor"). The tenora is pitched a fifth lower than the tible. These shawms are usually used with other instruments to accompany the traditional Catalan circle dance, the Sardana.

Other Catalan folk shawms are the tarota (pronounced [təˈɾɔtə]) the original keyless version of the tible, and the gralla (pronounced [ˈɡɾaʎə]), a short, strident instrument with a steep conical bore. Both of these resemble shawms from other parts of Spain, such as the dolçaina of Aragon and Valencia, and both employ open fingering.

== Difference between shawms and oboes ==
There are several distinct differences between shawms and oboes. Shawms normally have a larger bore, which makes them louder and more suitable than the oboe for outdoor playing. In addition, the bore is more "sword-shaped" than that of the oboe (it is more like a narrow parabola than a perfect cone). This gives the shawm a stronger, earthier, more fiery tone. Though favored in ancient times, some today find the sound harsh and irritating. The difference in bore shape also gives shawms additional problems with intonation. It was the goals of easier fingering, better intonation, and a sound and volume level more suitable for indoor use that prompted the innovations that turned the shawm into the oboe. The tible and tenora, however, were modernized with a modified bore and fully chromatic keywork without giving up their place in traditional bands and at festivals.

== Catalan shawms and other types of shawms ==
There are many shawms throughout the world (many of them in the Middle East and Asia) but Catalonia is one of the few places in Europe where they are still frequently used, and the only place where they have been given a modern mechanism (keywork) like orchestral woodwind instruments. Shawms used to be widespread in Europe up into the Renaissance. They were chiefly of two types: shawms that evolved from bagpipe chanters, and shawms that evolved from Middle Eastern instruments. The Italian ciaramella is an example of the former, and the tible and tenora of the latter. The oboe features aspects of both designs.

== Source and additional information ==
- Woodwind Instruments and Their History by Anthony Baines.
