= Cobla =

Catalonian music ensemble

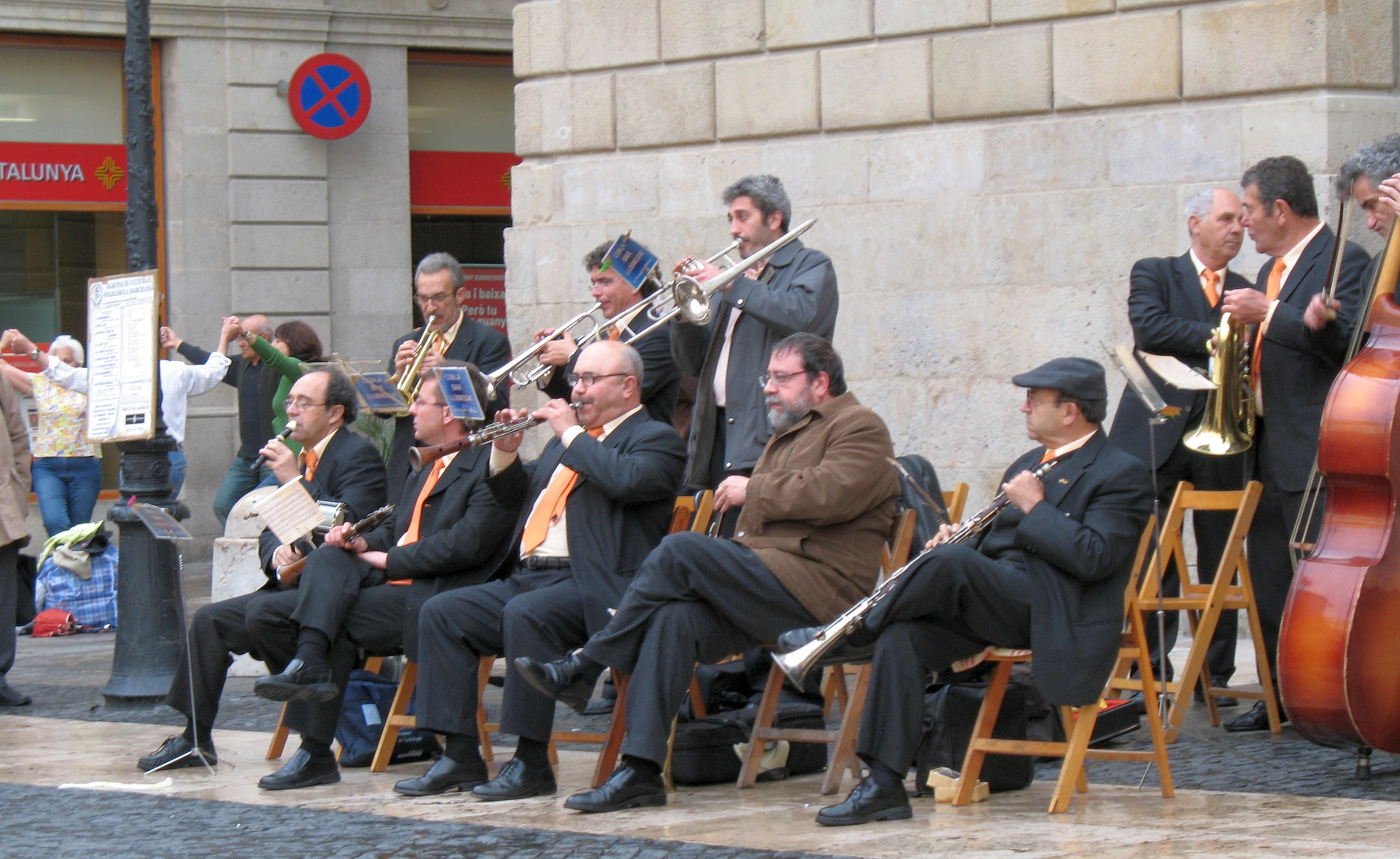
"Cobla Baix Llobregat" playing in front of the Palau de la Generalitat in Barcelona

The cobla (Catalan pronunciation: [ˈkobːlə], plural cobles) is a traditional music ensemble of Catalonia, and in Northern Catalonia in France. It is generally used to accompany the sardana, a traditional Catalan folk dance, danced in a circle.

== Structure ==
The modern Cobla normally consists of 11 players with the following instruments:

- One flabiol, a type of fipple flute played with the left hand while a tamborí, a small drum attached to the left arm of the player, is played with the other hand.
- Four Catalan shawms – double-reed woodwinds
  - Two tibles – a tible is like an oboe, but with a louder sound
  - Two tenores – a tenora is a larger version of the tible
- Five brass instruments
  - Two trumpets
  - A trombone – often a valve-trombone
  - Two fiscorns – a fiscorn is a rotary-valved baritone saxhorn with the bell facing forward, similar in appearance to a large flugelhorn
- A string bass – originally and still often a three-string double bass

There are small variations to this instrumentation in contemporary coblas: for example there is sometimes a third trumpet player.

The playing formation has two rows. The front row has (as seen by the audience from left to right) the flabiolist (with pipe and drum), the second and first tibles, and the first and second tenores. The back row, often raised, has the second and first trumpets, the trombone, and the first and second fiscorns. The double bass player, often standing, is on the right of the band.

== History ==
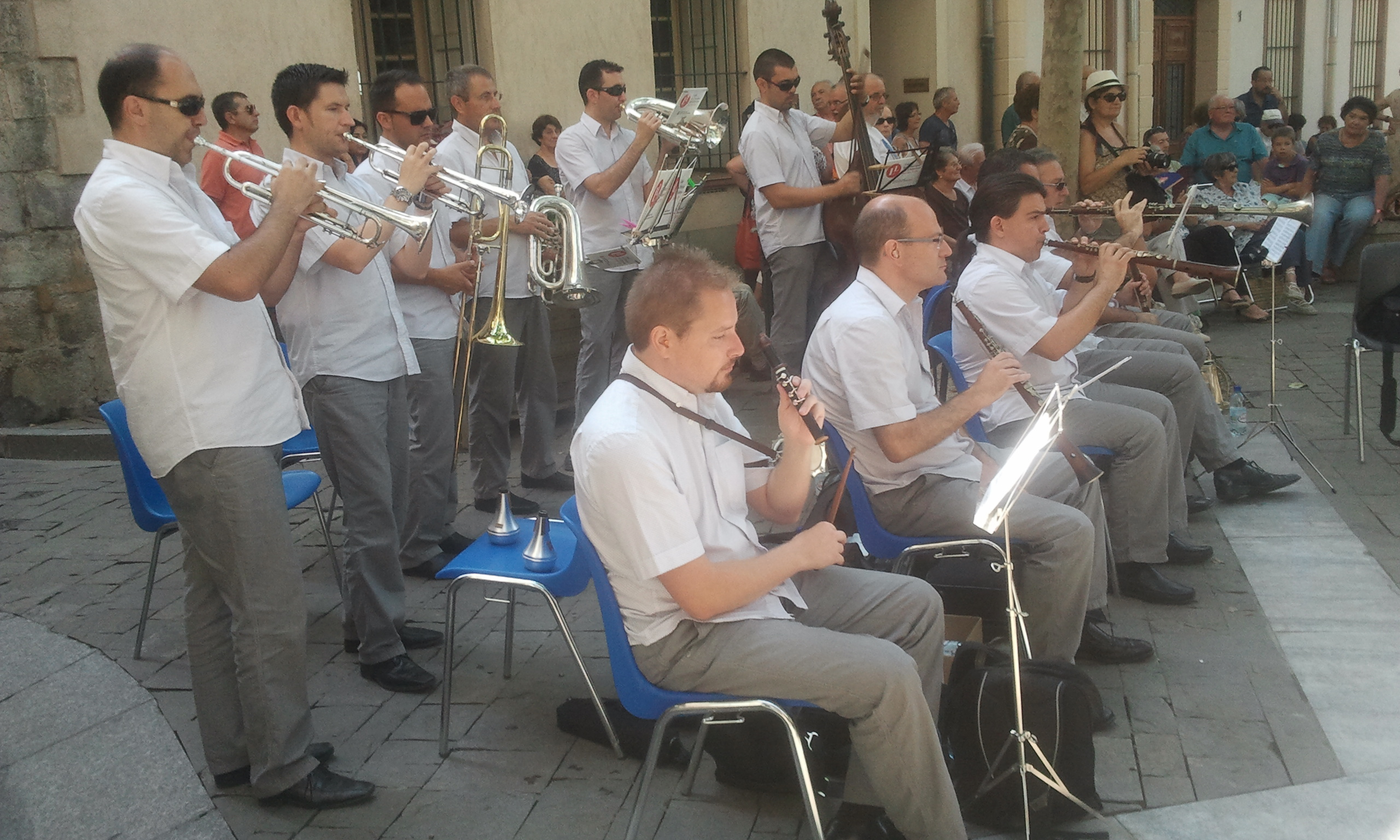
Cobla Principal de Llobregat playing in Céret (2013)

Originally, the cobla was a 3-piece band:

- One person played the flabiol and drum
- The second person played the tible
- The third played bagpipes

The main instrument in the cobla, the tenora, was developed around 1850 by French-Catalan luthier Andreu Toron, in Perpignan/Perpinyà.

The modern 11-piece cobla was developed by the Catalan musician Josep Maria "Pep" Ventura. He wrote over 200 Sardana compositions.

== See also ==
- Sardana
