= Laura Almerich =

Spanish classical guitarist (1940–2019)

Laura Almerich Santacreu
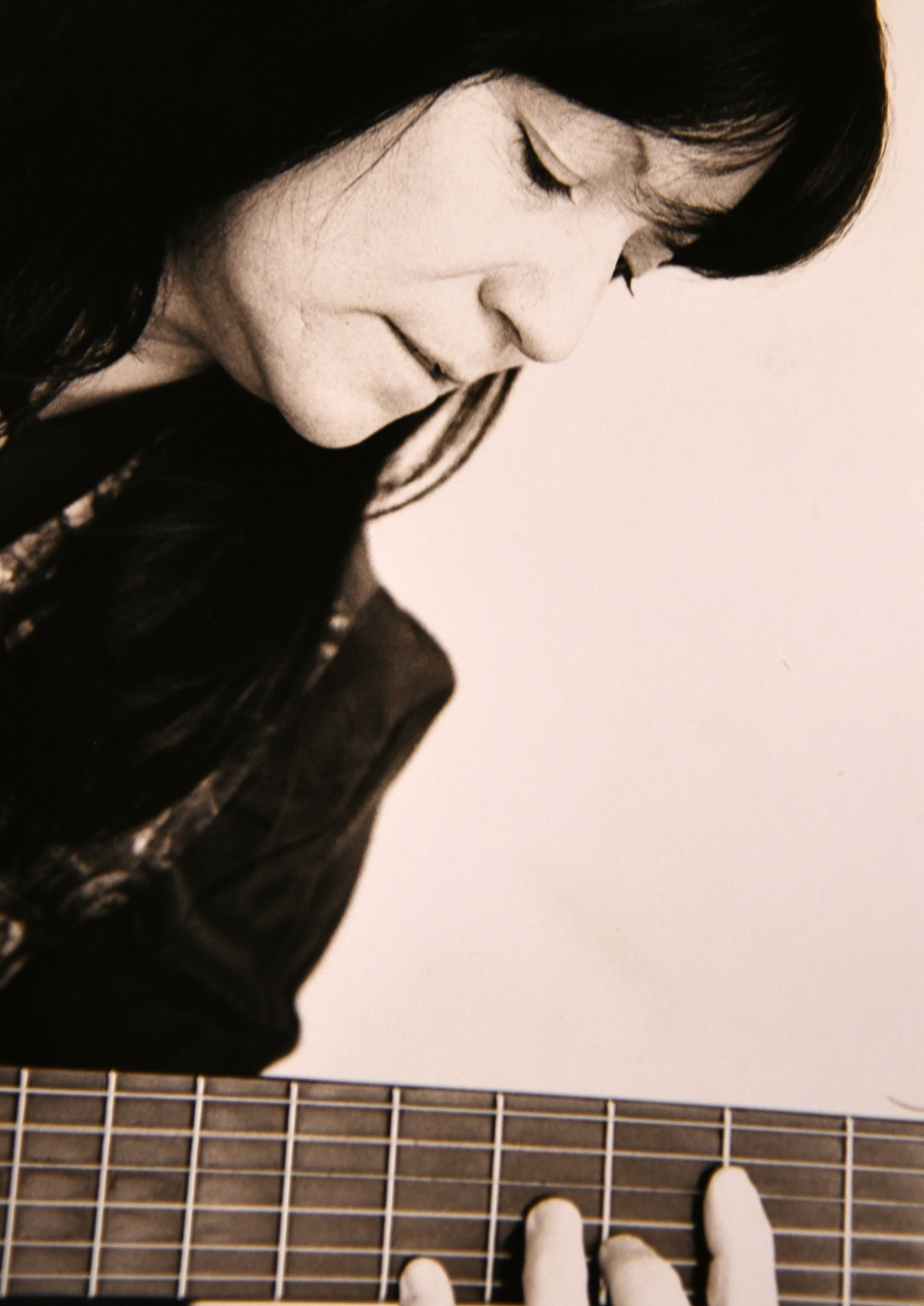
- Laura Almerich

Background information
- Born: 3 July 1940; Barcelona, Spain
- Died: 14 June 2019 (aged 78); Barcelona, Spain
- Genres: Nova Cançó
- Instrument: Classical guitar
- Formerly of: Ars Musicae de Barcelona, Quartet Tarragó

Laura Almerich Santacreu (3 July 1940 – 14 June 2019) was a classical Spanish guitarist from Barcelona. She is remembered in particular for accompanying the successful Catalan-language singer Lluís Llach since he embarked on his career in the late 1960s. As a result, she was closely associated with the Catalan Nova Cançó movement. Llach dedicated two songs to her: "Laura" (1977) and "Roses blanques" (White Roses, 1994).

== Biography ==
Born on 3 July 1940 in Barcelona, Almerich studied piano at the Barcelona Conservatory before concentrating on the guitar under Renata Tarragó. She was one of the members of the medieval music group Ars Musicae and a founding member of the Quartet Tarragó.

It was Tarragó who introduced her to Nova Cançó as the second guitar on Maria del Mar Bonet's first record in 1967. From 1969, she became the constant companion and confidant of Lluís Llach, accompanying him on the guitar throughout his career. When for political reasons, Llach had to perform outside of Spain, he always used his initial savings to have Almerich come and join him. She did not normally expect to be paid for her services, only for the cost of the trip.

At the end of a concert in 1977, he surprised her by dedicating "Laura" to her. It has become one of the Catalans' most beloved songs. The two sang it together during their concert at Camp Nou in 1985. Almerich was so overcome by emotion that she was unable to complete her solo, breaking down in tears. In 1994, Llach dedicated a second song to her "Roses blanques".

Laura Almerich died in Barcelona on 14 June 2019 after a long illness.
