= Ars Musicae de Barcelona =

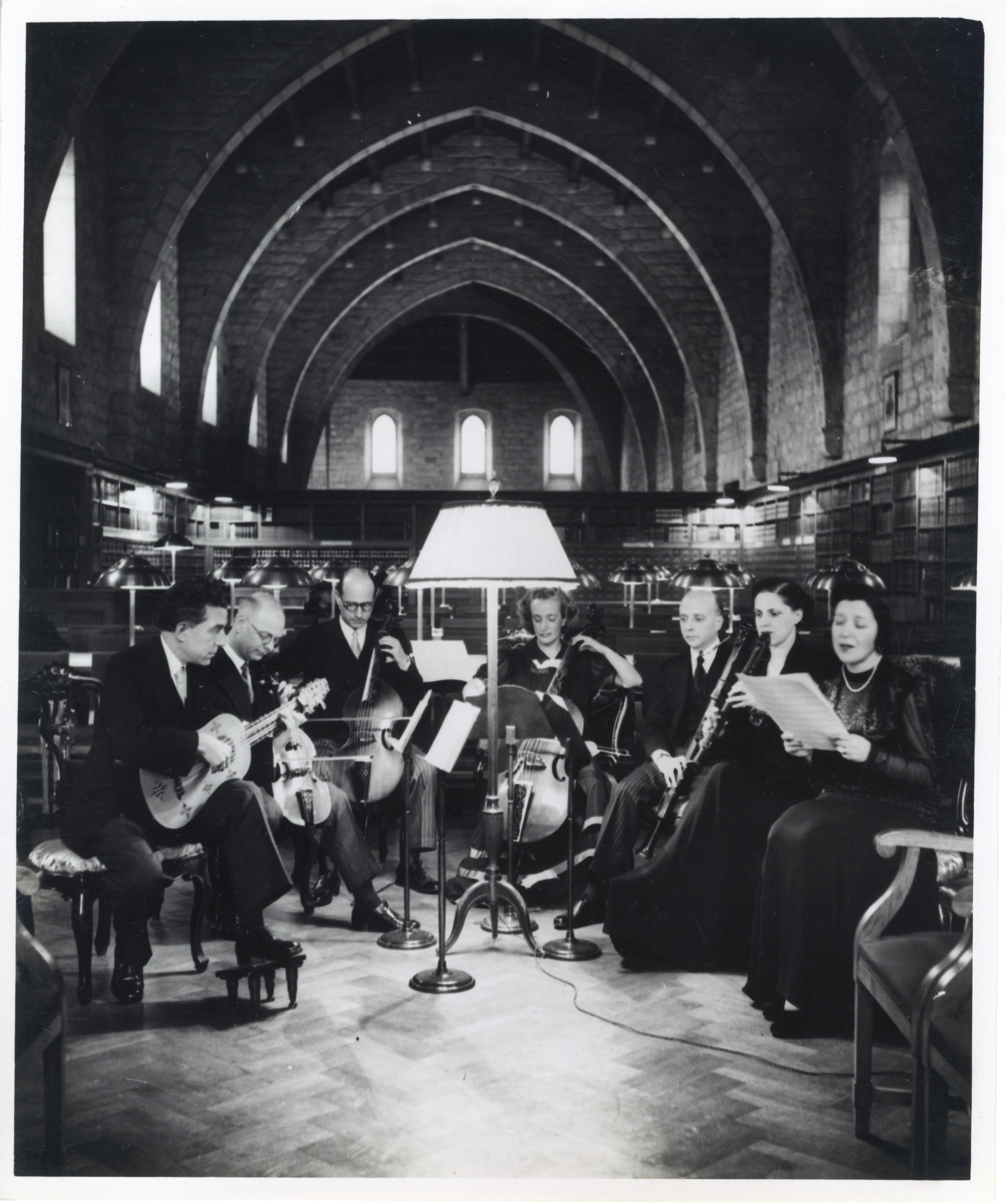
1941, Ars Musicae, Biblioteca de Catalunya.

Ars Musicae de Barcelona was a Catalan ensemble for the performance of medieval music active between 1935 and 1979.

The directors were:

- Josep María Lamaña (1935–1957); industrial engineer and amateur musician.
- Enric Gispert (1957–1972); a choral conductor.
- Romà Escalas Llimona (1972–1979); director of the Museu de la Música de Barcelonafrom 1981 to 2011.

Victoria de Los Angeles had a long association with the group, and her earliest surviving recording (from 1942) is with Lamaña. Jordi Savall and Montserrat Figueras both performed early in their careers with Ars Musicae of Barcelona while it was directed by Gispert.

== Selected discography ==
for a more complete discography click the original Spanish Wikipedia article

- Victoria de Los Angeles Songs of Spain with Barcelona Ars Musicae - Enrique Gispert, Rec.: 04/1967. His Master's Voice "Angel Series" SAN 194 [LP]
- Le Moyen Age Catalan de l'art Romain a la Renaissance LP 1970, Harmonia Mundi, CD Musique d'abord HMA 190051 36'14
- La música en la corte española de Carlos V, Ministerio de Educación y Ciencia, Book and LP MEC-1004
