= Antonio Herrera-Vaillant =

Venezuelan journalist

Antonio A. Herrera-Vaillant
- Born: 24 December 1942 (age 83); Havana, Cuba
- Citizenship: Venezuela
- Occupations: Writer, business leader, historian, journalist
- Title: President of the Venezuelan Institute of Genealogy

Antonio Alfredo Herrera-Vaillant y Buxó-Canel (born 1942) is an exiled Cuban Venezuelan business leader, writer, journalist and historian. In addition to heading the Venezuela-America Chamber of Commerce (VenAmCham), Herrera is the author of six books, including the latest Bolivar, Empresario, which author and El Nuevo Herald columnist Carlos Alberto Montaner named as his "most interesting" book of 2014. In addition to his business and writing success, Herrera is the first non-Spaniard to be honored with a Gold Medal from Spain's prestigious Real Academia de la Historia. Herrera-Vaillant is the president of the Venezuelan Institute of Genealogy.

== Background ==
Herrera-Vaillant was born in Havana, Cuba, in 1942 to Antonio M. Herrera-Vaillant (of Spanish, French and Irish descent), of Santiago de Cuba, who served as treasurer of Cuba's National Industry Association, and Laura María Buxó-Canel Decurnex (of Spanish, French-Swiss and Irish descent), of Buenos Aires, Argentina; by his mother, he is great-grandson of Spanish-Cuban authors Eloy Perillán y Buxó and Eva Canel. After the 1959 Cuban Revolution, Herrera-Vaillant fled Cuba for Florida and began an early career in television and radio journalism in Miami in 1961.

Ancestors of Antonio Herrera-Vaillant

16. Antonio José Herrera y López del Castillo (1810–1895)
8. José Joaquín Herrera y Bell (1842–1888)
34. Ricardo María Bell Maxwell (born Richard Maxwell Bell; c. 1775–1847)
17. Isabel María Bell Yrady
35. María Candelaria Irady del Castillo (†1837)
4. Antonio Norberto Herrera del Castillo (1870–1953)
18. Emiliano del Castillo y Rizo
9. María de las Mercedes del Castillo y Jústiz
19. María de la Concepción Jústiz y Ferrer
2. Antonio M. Herrera-Vaillant (1901–1979)
40. Antonio Cándido Vaillant Berthier, 1st Marquis of La Candelaria del Yarayabo (1758–1829)
20. José Mariano Vaillant y de las Cuevas (1801–1881; cousin of #43)
41. Juana María de las Cuevas y Duany (1767–1828; aunt of #43)
10. Mariano de Jesús Vaillant y Girón (1839–1906)
42. Andrés María Girón Loyzaga (1757–1833)
21. Rafaela Girón de las Cuevas (1807–1847)
43. Beatriz Josefa Felipa de las Cuevas y Hernández (niece of #41)
5. María Magdalena Vaillant López del Castillo (1874–1965)
22. Antonio Herrera Muñoz (1740–1820)
11. María Dolores López del Castillo y de la Cruz (1849–1925)
23. Isabel López del Castillo y Garzón (1761–1830)
1. Antonio Alfredo Herrera-Vaillant y Buxó-Canel (1942)
12. Eloy Perillán y Buxó (1848–1889)
6. Eloy Emilio P. Buxó-Canel (1878–1924)
26. Pedro Infanzón
13. Agar Eva Infanzón Canel (1857–1932)
27. Epifanía Canel y Uría
3. Laura María Buxó-Canel y Décurnex (1912–1968)
14. Justin Marc Décurnex Henry (1845–1933)
7. Elisa Julia Margarita Décurnex MacAlister
15. MacAlister

== Biography ==
Herrera-Vaillant began his career in television and radio journalism in Miami in 1961 as producer of "La Semana en Español", one of the first Spanish language programs on Florida television, at WCKT Channel 7, a Cox and Knight publishing family NBC affiliate, which is now called WSVN. Herrera became the station's Latin America News Editor, and then became Bureau Manager for ABC News Latin America, based in Miami.

Herrera-Vaillant's success helped him transfer to Washington, D.C., bureau of the American Broadcasting Company as associate producer of Issues and Answers, the Sunday interview program on that network, and as a Field Producer for news and special events. He completed a bachelor's degree at Georgetown University. In 1968 he put together the debate between Democratic senators Robert Kennedy and Eugene McCarthy, running for the party's nomination that year.

=== 1970s ===
In 1970, Herrera-Vaillant was recruited by General William Henry Draper, Jr. to serve as Western Hemisphere Resource Development Director at the International Planned Parenthood Federation to promote fundraising on behalf of birth control throughout Latin America.

After a brief period based in Brazil, Herrera-Vaillant settled in Caracas as a founder and director of Fundación Paternidad Responsible (1971), promoting planned parenthood in Venezuela.

In 1974 Herrera-Vaillant served as commissioner for Caracas Governor Diego Arria and later as secretary general in Venezuela's newly created Ministry for Information and Tourism (1976–1978). As such, he served as chairman of the OAS Tourism Commission, of the Caribbean Tourism Association, and the Caribbean Hotel Association; and member of the executive committee of the UN World Tourism Organization, based in Madrid (1977–1978).

Herrera-Vaillant took part in Venezuela's 1978 presidential campaign ( ) as secretary general of CAUSA COMÚN which was founded by Presidential candidate Diego Arria. After Copei's Luis Herrera Campins was successful, Herrera-Vaillant returned to his consultancy, working with the Latin American Economic System (SELA), the Caracas Chamber of Commerce and as a campaign consultant with Gerald Rafshoon Associates, as a political image and campaign consultant for candidates Luis Bedoya Reyes in Peru; and Napoleón Duarte in El Salvador.

=== 1980s ===
In 1982 Herrera-Vaillant joined Grupo Cisneros working directly with Gustavo Cisneros as the group's director for institutional affairs for eight years. During this period he was a four term president of the Cosmetics, Toiletries and Fragrances Industrial Association (CAVEINCA), served as treasurer and Secretary of the board of directors of CONINDUSTRIA, Venezuela's Council of Industries; and as president of the Legislative Affairs, Integration (Andean Pact) and International Affairs Committees of FEDECÁMARAS, the Federation of Chambers of Commerce and Industry, the country's main business organization. As such, he was private sector chief negotiator in drafting the Consumer Protection, Foreign Investment and Labor laws of the time.

Between 1983 and 1986, Mr. Herrera-Vaillant also served internationally as Hemispheric Secretary General of the Inter-American Trade and Production Council (CICYP), which was the principal group representing private enterprises in the Americas and Spain.

=== 1990s ===
In June 1990, Herrera-Vaillant became chief executive officer of the Venezuelan American Chamber of Commerce and Industry (VENAMCHAM), a position he held until April 2006. During this period the chamber grew into one of the largest overseas American chambers and the most influential business organization in Venezuela. Corporate membership grew from around 842 to 1200, participating executives rose from 2660 to close to 9000, and staff increased from 17 to 106. Service committees increased from 16 to 38, plus six regional operations were created in Maracaibo, Barquisimeto, Valencia, Puerto La Cruz, Maturín, and Porlamar and Herrera took control of Business Venezuela as editor-in-chief and re-designed it as a monthly magazine, making it profitable and second in circulation for all economic magazines in Venezuela. Herrera also created an "ALIANZA SOCIAL" to identify private sector contributions to social problems, promote corporate responsibility, and foster synergy and strategic alliances to accomplish socially valuable goals. He also created one of Venezuela's first private arbitration centers: The Business Center for Conciliation and Arbitration (CEDCA).

Herrera-Vaillant led Venamcham's to establish a U.S.-Venezuela Bilateral Investment Protection Treaty (BIT) and helped obtain the passage of a Treaty to Avoid Double Taxation between both nations (1999), as well as the solution of numerous bilateral trade and investment issues, including formation of a Bilateral Trade and Investment Council.

=== 2000s ===
Herrera-Vaillant was active internationally in the Association of American Chambers of Commerce in Latin America (AACCLA), where served as member of the board of director and chairman of the nominating committee, and of the management committee which oversees the functioning of American chambers throughout the Americas. During this time he actively participated in lobbying on behalf of NAFTA, CAFTA and the Chile and Colombia Free Trade Agreements, and was an active speaker on Venezuelan and Latin American issues.

In 2000, as the Chamber celebrated its 50th anniversary and Herrera-Vaillant served as editor of a 500-page history of bilateral relations in Spanish: "Venezuela y Estados Unidos a través de 2 siglos".

Upon retiring from VENAMCHAM he founded the Inter American Corporate Advisory Network (I-CAN) to assist corporate regional operations through high-level consulting services in public affairs, business facilitation and opportunity development. I-CAN VENEZUELA became affiliated with the OGILVY Group of Companies; and I-CAN COLOMBIA has been a strategic ally of ARAÚJO IBARRA ASOCIADOS, Colombia's leading consulting firm on international trade.

At the same time, Herrera-Vaillant was appointed Senior International Advisor at TORRES PLAZ & ARAUJO ABOGADOS, one of Venezuela's premier law firms; and was named International Consultant at Venezuela's GLOBOVISION TV Network.

He also served for two years (2007–2009) as Regional representative for ENTERPRISE FLORIDA in Northern South America, with offices he established in Bogotá, Colombia.

In 2009 became International Partner for Venezuela, Colombia, Central America and the Caribbean at UPITE CONSULTING SERVICES S.L. (Underperformance Improving Technologies Enterprise), a Spanish consulting firm that provides revenue enhancement services to banks and other financial institutions.

== Publishing ==
Mr. Herrera-Vaillant has continued to work within his principal avocation as a historian and writer, and is a newspaper columnist syndicated bi-monthly in EL UNIVERSAL (Caracas), NOTITARDE (Valencia), EL IMPULSO (Barquisimeto), LA NACIÓN (San Cristóbal), EL TIEMPO (Puerto La Cruz), and MIAMI DIARIO, in Florida. He served on the board of directors of the now defunct DAILY JOURNAL, Venezuela's English language daily, and is editor of VENEZUELAN DAILY BRIEF, an overview of the economy, finance, politics and more, published twice a week in association with Duarte Vivas & Asociados and The Selinger Group.

He has published numerous articles and several books, including:

- "Efectos y resultados del trabajo: hacia la renovación del crecimiento económico en América Latina" (Fondo Editorial Latino n 19, Santiago, Chile, 1988
- "Bolívar, Empresario: También víctima de la inseguridad jurídica", Academia Nacional de la Historia; reprinted by CEDICE and in Ecuador.
- "Venezuela y los Estados Unidos a través de 2 siglos", a 510-page history of bilateral relations. (Caracas, 2000), as editor).
- "La Estirpe de las Rojas", two volumes, published by the National Academy of History and the Venezuelan Genealogical Institute (2007)
- "El Nudo Deshecho: Compendio genealógico de El Libertador", published by the National Academy of History and the Venezuelan Genealogical Institute (2010)
- "Bolivar, Empresario", published by Editorial PLANETA in Caracas, October 2014

When asked for his favorite book of 2014, the award-winning writer and columnist Carlos Alberto Montaner named "Bolivar, Empresario." ""I found interesting an essay titled "Bolívar, Empresario" by Cuban-Venezuelan historian Antonio Herrera-Vaillant, published by Planeta," said Montaner. "It reveals the difficulties of 'The Liberator' in the fight against bureaucracy to produce from mines he owned. For Chavez it is a blow confirming that the revered Bolívar was or wanted to be a successful capitalist. The work, moreover, proves how the state can be a tremendous source of unhappiness. Maybe that's why Bolívar went on to state that 'the only thing you can do in America is emigrate.'"

== Awards ==
He serves as president of the Venezuelan Genealogical Institute, and is the first person not born in Spain to be honored with a gold medal, bestowed by Spain's Royal Academy of History. He is also a member of the board of the New York-based Venezuelan American Endowment for the Arts (VAEA).

Herrera-Vaillant has also received Venezuela's Order Francisco de Miranda, and Order of Merit at Work.

== Family ==
Herrera-Vaillant and his wife Carolina Stone Tovar, a banking and cultural executive who serves as chairman of FUDENA live in Caracas and Margarita Island. They have two children: Laura María (aka Lala Canel), a lawyer, writer and art curator; and Antonio J. Herrera-Vaillant, an engineer and free lance film director and editor in California; as well as two grandsons.
