= Agustí Grau =

Spanish (Catalan) composer

Agustí Grau i Huguet (1893–1964) was a Spanish (Catalan) composer.

Grau was born in Alforja, province of Tarragona, and studied with Enric Morera at the Liceu Conservatory of Barcelona. He directed the Orfeó Alforgenc (a choir) between 1912 and 1920 and was active as accountant for the Associació Intima de Concerts in the city. In 1923, he was the founder and first editor of the journal Revista Catalana de Música.

He was the least well-known member of the short-lived CIC (Independent Composers of Catalonia) in the early 1930s, which was made up of Federico Mompou, Roberto Gerhard, Manuel Blancafort, Ricard Lamote de Grignon, Baltasar Samper, Eduard Toldrà and the pianist Joan Gilbert Camins.

In 1930, Grau composed the barcarolle Tamarit for piano, a fairly ambitious work, which makes use in its central section of folk songs with mozarabic inflections from the area of Tarragona (in the south of Catalonia). He composed for a wide range of instruments and was particularly successful with publications of his music for the classical guitar. For the fingering of these works he cooperated with Miguel Llobet and Emilio Pujol.

== Selected works ==
- Berceuse ancienne (Évocation) (1957), for guitar
- Corranda (Ancienne danse catalane) (1929), for guitar
- Escenes de la llar, for violin and piano
- Fable (Petite tragédie imaginaire entre deux belettes) (1934), for guitar
- Hores íntimes, for piano
- Tamarit (Barcarolle) (1930), for piano
