= Jordi Savall =

Spanish-Catalan musician, conductor and composer (born 1941)

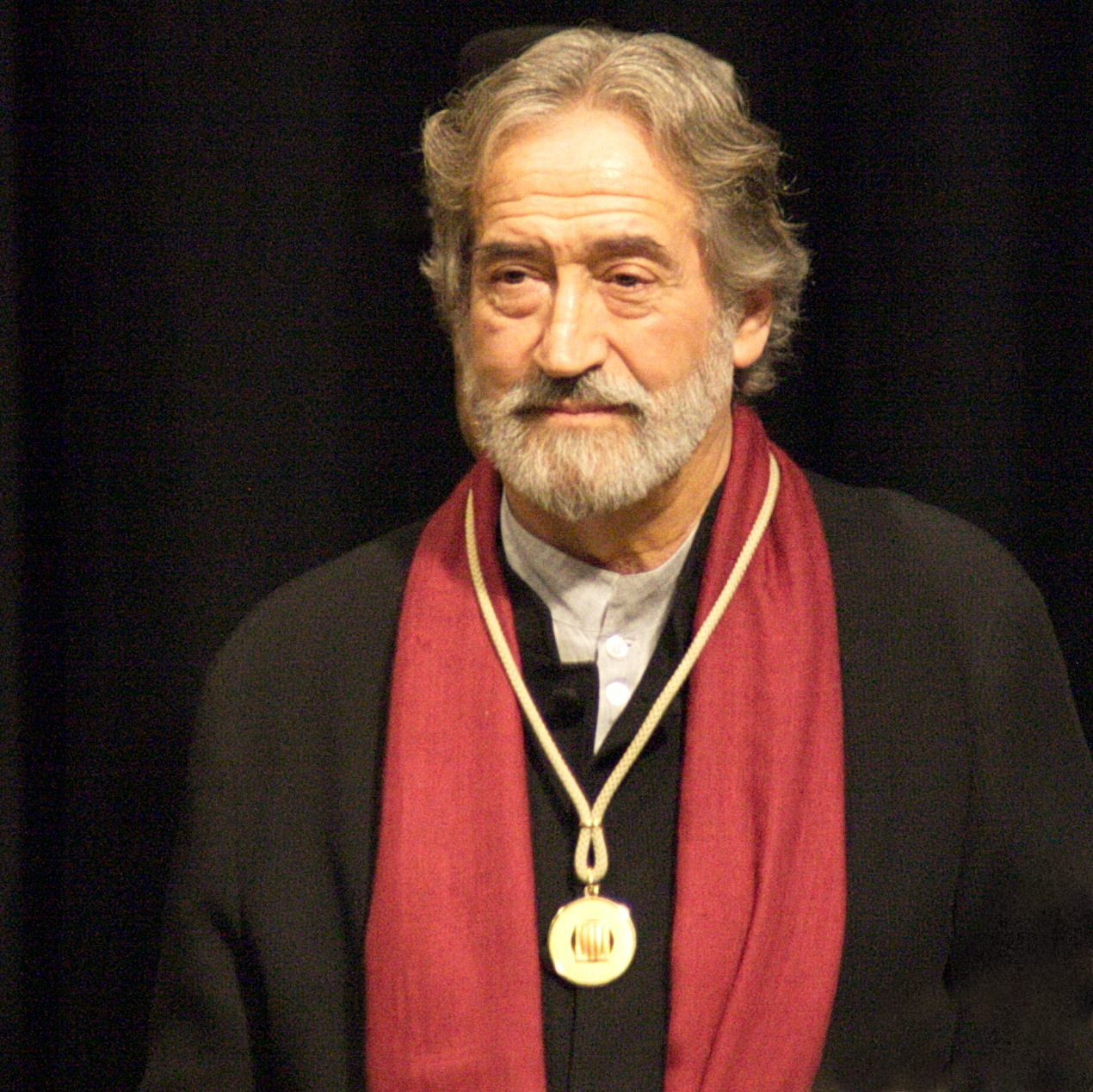
- Savall in 2014, when he received the Gold Medal of the Generalitat de Catalunya

Background information
- Born: Jordi Savall i Bernadet; 1 August 1941 (age 85); Igualada, Barcelona, Catalonia, Spain
- Genres: Classical, western early music
- Occupations: Conductor, gambist, composer
- Instruments: Viola da gamba, viola da braccio
- Labels: EMI Classics, Astrée, Alia Vox
- Spouse(s): Montserrat Figueras (1968–2011); Maria Bartels (2017–present)
- Website: www.alia-vox.com

Jordi Savall i Bernadet (Catalan: [ˈʒɔɾði səˈβaʎ i βəɾnəˈðɛt]; born 1 August 1941) is a Spanish conductor, composer and viol player. He has been one of the major figures in the field of Western early music since the 1970s, largely responsible for popularizing the viol family of instruments (notably the viola da gamba) in contemporary performance and recording. As a historian of early music his repertoire features everything from medieval, Renaissance and Baroque through to the Classical and Romantic periods. He has incorporated non-western musical traditions in his work including African vernacular music for a documentary on slavery.

== Musical education ==
His musical training started at age six in the school choir of his native Igualada (1947–55). After graduating from the Barcelona's Conservatory of Music (where he studied from 1959 to 1965) he specialized in early music, collaborating with Ars Musicae de Barcelona under Enric Gispert, studying with August Wenzinger at the Schola Cantorum Basiliensis in Basel, Switzerland (1968–70) and eventually succeeding Wenzinger in 1974 as professor of viola da gamba at the Schola Cantorum Basiliensis.

== Ensembles ==
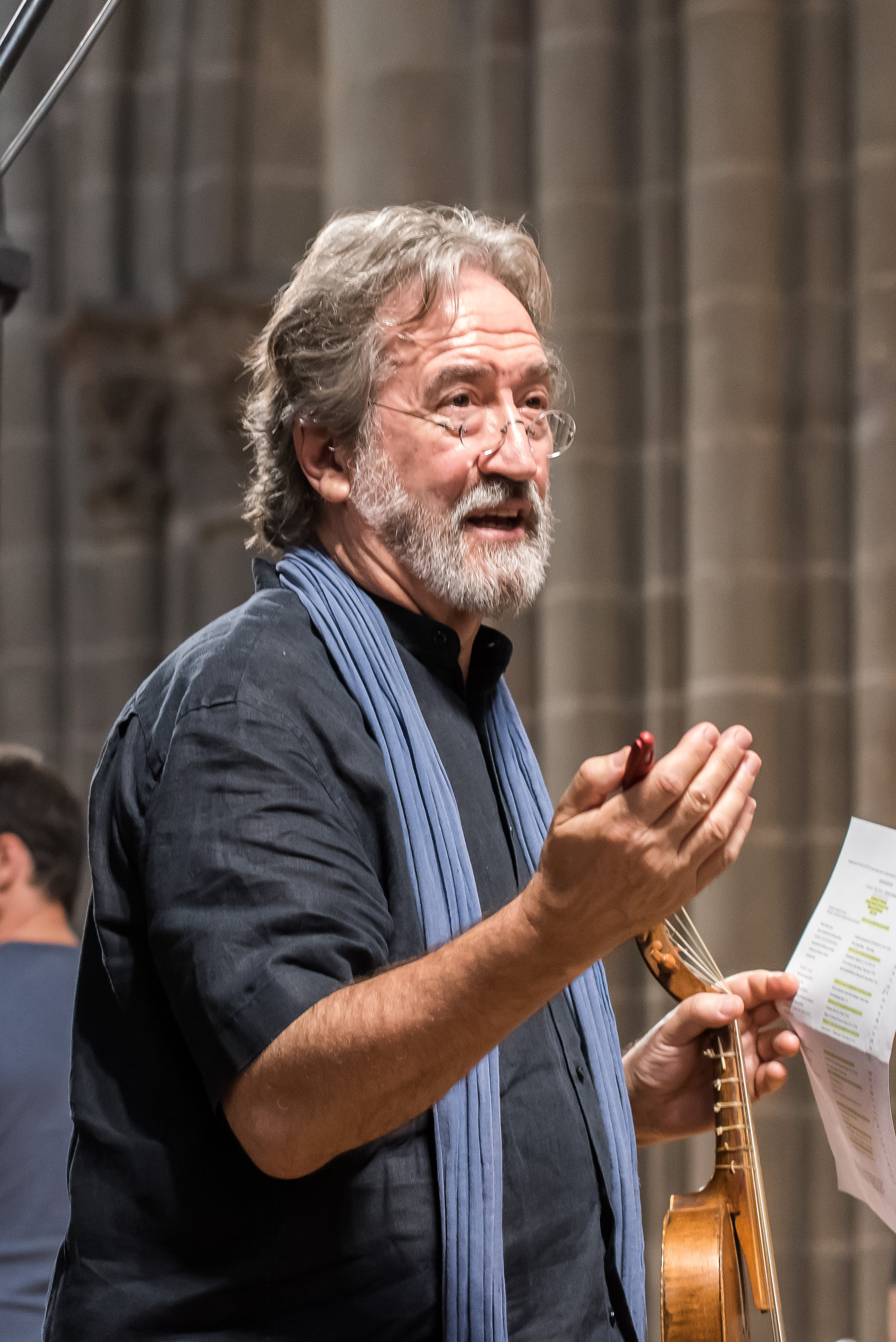
Savall rehearsing for the creation of Les routes de l'esclavage for Festival Agapé at Geneva Cathedral, June 2015

In 1974 he formed the ensemble Hespèrion XX (known since 2000 as Hespèrion XXI), together with his wife soprano Montserrat Figueras, Lorenzo Alpert and Hopkinson Smith. Hespèrion XX favored a style of interpretation characterized simultaneously by great musical vitality and maximum historical accuracy.

In 1987 he returned to Barcelona to found La Capella Reial de Catalunya, a vocal ensemble devoted to pre-eighteenth-century music. In 1989 he founded Le Concert des Nations, an orchestra generally emphasizing Baroque period, but sometimes also Classical and even Romantic music such as, for example, Sinfonía [por] Grande Orquesta by Juan Crisóstomo Arriaga (1806–1826).

More recently Savall has performed with family members. The family ensemble has included his wife Montserrat Figueras (who died in 2011) and their two children, Arianna and Ferran. Arianna plays the harp and sings, like her mother; Ferran plays the theorbo (bass lute) and sings, not only with his family, but also in Barcelona jazz clubs.

In several of his recordings and concerts, Savall and his ensembles have incorporated non-western musical traditions, including African vernacular music played by musicians of the ensemble 3MA (Driss el Maloumi, Ballake Sissoko, Rajery) in Les Routes de l’Esclavage or The Routes of Slavery (2017). In their performances and albums titled Orient-Occident, Savall and musicians from the Middle East have presented traditional Arabic, Christian and Sephardic music, originating from medieval Al-Andalus, Syria, Morocco and Turkey.

Additionally, Savall has created music festivals, such as the Festival musique et histoire in the Fontfroide Abbey in southern France and the Jordi Savall Festival, set in historic monasteries of Catalonia.

== Personal life ==
Savall was married to Montserrat Figueras from 1968 to her death in 2011. They had a daughter, Arianna Savall, and a son, Ferran Savall. On 23 June 2017, Savall married the Dutch philosopher Maria Bartels, in Cardona.

== Recordings ==
Savall's discography includes more than 200 recordings. Originally recording with EMI Classics, and then from 1975 on Michel Bernstein's Astrée label, since 1998 he has recorded on his own label, Alia Vox.

== Honours and awards ==
- 2000 – Premi d'Honor Lluís Carulla for service to Catalan culture or for scientific, cultural or civic works in the Catalan language
- 2006 – Honorary doctorate from the University of Barcelona
- 2008 – Appointed European Union ambassador for intercultural dialogue
- 2008 – Savall and his wife, Montserrat Figueras, were named "Artists for Peace" by UNESCO.
- 2009 – Handel Prize from the city of Halle, Germany
- 2009 – National Music Prize from the National Council of Music and Arts of Catalonia
- 2010 – Praetorius Musikpreis Niedersachsen
- 2010 – MIDEM Classical Award for his album "Jerusalem – la ville des deux Paix: La paix céleste et la paix terrestre"
- 2011 – Grammy Award for Best Small Ensemble Performance for Dinastia Borja. Església i poder al Renaixement
- 2012 – Léonie Sonning Music Prize
- 2013 – Chevalier de la Légion d'honneur (France)
- 2013 – Honorary doctorate from the University of Basel
- 2014 – Gold Medal of the Generalitat of Catalonia
- In 2014 he refused the Premio Nacional de Música awarded by the Spanish government, in protest at the government's artistic policies, accusing them of "grave incompetence" and "dramatic disinterest".
- 2016 – Honorary doctorate from Utrecht University
- 2022 – Honorary membership of the Royal Philharmonic Society
- 2026 – Ernst von Siemens Music Prize

== Discography with Alia Vox ==
Full discography as published on Alia Vox website:

- 1998 – Juan Cabanilles (AV9801)
- 1998 – José Marín (AVSA9802)
- 1998 – Les Voix Humaines (AV9803)
- 1998 – Elizabethan Consort Music 1558 – 1603 (AV9804)
- 1998 – La Folia 1490- 1701 (AVSA9805)
- 1999 – El Cant de la Sibil·la (AVSA9806)
- 1999 – Jean-Baptiste Lully (AVSA9807)
- 1999 – Missa Bruxellensis – Heinrich Ignaz Franz von Biber (AV9808)
- 1999 – Diaspora Sefardi (AV9809)
- 2000 – La Barcha d'Amore (AV9811)
- 2000 – Die Sonaten für Viola da Gamba und Cembalo (with Ton Koopman) – J.S. Bach (AV9812)
- 2000 – The Teares of the Muses. Anthony Holborne (AV9813)
- 2000 – Carlos V. La Canción del Emperador (AVSA9814)
- 2000 – Battaglie & Lamenti (1396–1458) (AV9815)
- 2001 – Alfons V El Magnànim (AV9816)
- 2001 – Harmonie Universelle (AV9810
- 2001 – Johann Sebastian Bach (AV9817)
- 2001 – Musikalisches Opfer – J.S. Bach (AVSA9818)
- 2001 – Die Kunst der Fuge- J.S. Bach (AV9819)
- 2001 – Ostinato (AV9820)
- 2001 – Tous les Matins du Monde (AVSA9821)
- 2002 – Farnace. Antonio Vivaldi AV9822)
- 2002 – William Lawes (AV9823)
- 2002 – L'Orchestre de Louis XIII (1601- 1643) (AV9824)
- 2002 – Henrich Ignaz Franz Biber (AV9825)
- 2002 – Ninna Nanna (AV9826)
- 2003 – Monsieur de Sainte Colombe le Fils (AV9827)
- 2003 – Le Parnasse de la viole (AV9829)
- 2003 – Pièces de Viole du Second Livre. Marin Marais (AV9828)
- 2003 – Bella Terra (AV9833)
- 2003 – Entremeses del siglo de oro (1550- 1650) (AVSA9831)
- 2003 – Alfonso Ferrabosco The Younger (AV9832)
- 2003 – Villancicos y Danzas Criollas (AV9834)
- 2003 – La Viola da Gama in Concerto – Antonio Vivaldi (AV9835)
- 2004 – Homenatge al Misteri d'Elx. La Vespra (AV9836)
- 2004 – Musicall Humors. Tobias Hume (AV9837)
- 2004 – Isabel I. Reina de Castilla (AVSA9838)2004 – Harmonie Universelle II (AV9839)
- 2005 – Les Concerts Royaux. François Couperin (AVSA9840)
- 2005 – Du temps & de l'instant (AVSA9841)
- 2005 – Les Grandes Eaux Musicales de Versailles (AV9842)
- 2005 – Don Quijote de la Mancha (AVSA9843)
- 2005 – Altre Follie (AVSA9844)
- 2005 – La Musica notturna delle strade di Madrid. Luigi Boccherini (AVSA9845)
- 2006 – Eine Kleine Nachtmusik. Wolfgang Amadeus Mozart (AVSA9846)
- 2006 – Lux Feminæ (AVSA9847)
- 2006 – Orient – Occident (AVSA9848)
- 2006 – Metamorphoses Fidei (AV9849)
- 2006 – Marin Marais Suitte d’un Goût Etranger (AVSA9851)
- 2006 – Christophorus Columbus (AVSA9850)
- 2007 – Lachrimae Caravaggio (AVSA9852)
- 2007 – Ludi Musici (AV9853)
- 2007 – Septem Verba Christi in Cruce. Joseph Haydn (AVSA9854)
- 2007 – Claudio Monteverdi (AVSA9855)
- 2007 – Francisco Javier – The Route to the Orient (AVSA9856)
- 2008 – Estampies & Danses Royales (AVSA9857)
- 2008 – Fantasias for the Viols. Henry Purcell (AVSA9859)
- 2008 – Water Music. Georg Friederich Haendel (AVSA9860)
- 2008 – Invocation a la nuit (AV9861)
- 2008 – Su la Cetra Amorosa. Tarquinio Merula (AVSA9862)
- 2008 – Mireu el nostre mar (AV9858)
- 2008 – Jérusalem (AVSA9863)
- 2009 – Ministriles Royales. Ménestrels royales – Royal Minstrels (AVSA9864A+B)
- 2009 – The Celtic Viol – La Viole Celtique (AVSA9865)
- 2009 – The Fairy Queen. The Prophetess. Henry Purcell (1659- 1695) (AVSA9866)
- 2009 – Maestros del Siglo de Oro (AVSA9867)
- 2009 – Peiwoh (AV9869)
- 2009 – Istanbul. Dimitrie Cantemir (AVSA9870)
- 2009 – Septem Verba Christ in Cruce. Joseph Haydn (CD/DVD) (AVDVD9868)
- 2009 – Le Royaumé Oublié (AVSA9873)
- 2010 – The Brandenbourgh Concertos – JS. Bach (AVSA9871)
- 2010 – El Nuevo Mundo (AVSA9876)
- 2010 – Le Concert Spirituel. Corelli. Telemann. Rameau (AVSA9877)
- 2010 – The Celtic Viol II. Treble Viol & Lyra Viol (AVSA9878)
- 2010 – Dinastia Borgia (AVSA9875)
- 2010 – Pièces de Viole des Cinq Livres. Marin Marais (AVSA9872)
- 2011 – Requiem. Wolfgang Amadeus Mozart (AVSA9880)
- 2011 – El Cant de la Sibil·la a Catalunya (AVSA9879)
- 2011 – Cançons de la Catalunya Mil·lenària. Planys & Llegendes (AVSA9881)
- 2011 – L'orquestre de Louis XV. Jean-Philippe Rameau (AVSA9882)
- 2011 – Hispania & Japan (AVSA9883)
- 2011 – Aria e Lamenti. Madrigali. Claudio Monteverdi (AVSA9884)
- 2011 – Concerts à Deux Violes Esgales. Sieur de Sainte-Colombe (AVSA9885)
- 2011 – La Sublime Porte (AVSA9887)
- 2011 – Mare Nostrum (AVSA9888)
- 2012 – La Voix de l'Emotion. Montserrat Figueras (AVSA9889)
- 2012 – Les Quatre Ouvertures. J.S Bach (AVSA9890)
- 2012 – Jeanne D'Arc (AVSA9891)
- 2012 – Ésprit D'Arménie. Armenian Spirit (AVSA9892)
- 2012 – Pièces de Violes 1728. François Couperin (AVSA9893)
- 2012 – Pro·Pacem AVSA9894)
- 2013 – Messe en Si Mineur . J.S. Bach (AVDVD9896A)
- 2013 – Erasmus (AVSA9895)
- 2013 – 25 anys Capella Reial de Catalunya. 25 años La Capella Reial de Catalunya. (AVSA9897)
- 2013 – Esprit des Balkans/Balkan Spirit (AVSA9898)
- 2013 – Recercadas del Tratado de Golsas. Diego de Ortiz ( AVSA9899)
- 2013 – Orient- Occident II ( AVSA9900)
- 2013 – Lachrimae or Seven Teares. John Dowland (AVSA9901)
- 2013 – Bal·Kan: Miel & Sang (AVSA9902)
- 2014 – Alcyone. Marin Marais (AVSA9903)
- 2014 – The Voice of Emotion II. Montserrat Figueras (AVDVD9904)
- 2014 – Marc-Antoine Charpentier à la Chapelle Royale de Versailles (AVDVD9905)
- 2014 – La Lira d'Esperia II. Galicia (AVSA9907)
- 2014 – Magnificat and Concerti. Antonio Vivaldi. Johann Sebastian Bach (AVSA9909D)
- 2015 – War and Peace. 1614- 1714 (AVSA9908)
- 2015 – Euskel Antiqva (AV9910)
- 2015 – L'Orfeo. Claudio Monteverdi (AVSA9911)
- 2015 – Baroque Splendor. Henrich Ignaz Franz Biber (AVSA9912)
- 2015 – Les Éléments (AVSA9914)
- 2016 – Simfonía Eroica. Ludwig van Beethoven. AVSA9916)
- 2016 – Marquise (AV9701)
- 2016 – Ramon Llull 1232 · 1316 (AVSA9917)
- 2016 – Granada 1013- 1502 (AVSA9915)
- 2016 – Dixit Dominus. (AVSA9918)
- 2016 – Llibre Vermell de Montserrat (AVSA9919)
- 2017 – Les Routes de l’Esclavage (AVSA9920)
- 2017 – Henricus Isaac (AVSA9922)
- 2017 – Cantigas de Santa Maria (AVSA9923)
- 2017 – In Excelsis Deo (AVSA9924)
- 2017 – Venezia Millenaria (AVSA9925)
- 2018 – Musica Nova (AVSA9926)
- 2018 – Bailar Cantando (AVSA9927)
- 2018 – Les Nations – François Couperin (AVSA9928)
- 2018 – Terpsichore (AVSA9929)
- 2018 – Ibn Battuta – Le Voyageur de l’Islam 1304–1377 (AVSA9930)
- 2019 – J.S. Bach – Markus Passion (AVSA9931)
- 2019 – W.A. Mozart – Le Testament Symphonique (AVSA9934)
- 2019 – A. Vivaldi – Juditha Triumphans (AVSA9935)
- 2019 – Handel – Messiah (AVSA9936)
- 2020 – Beethoven – Révolution Symphonies 1 à 5 (AVSA9937)
- 2020 – Marin Marais Alcione. Tragédie lyrique (AVSA9939)
- 2020 – J.S. Bach – Weihnachts-Oratorium (AVSA9940)
- 2021 – Tomás Luis de Victoria – Passion Officium Hebdomadæ Sanctæ (AVSA9943)
- 2021 – Couperin – Apothéoses (AVSA9944)
- 2021 – Joseph Haydn – La Création (AVSA9945)
- 2022 – Beethoven – Révolution Symphonies 6 à 9 (AVSA9946)
- 2024 – Mirrors of Time (AVSA9957)
- 2024 – A. Vivaldi – L’orchestra dell’Ospedale della Pietà, Le Quattro Stagioni & Concerti d’Il cimento dell’armonia e dell’inventione (AVSA9958)

== Filmography ==
Savall adapted and performed music for the 1991 Alain Corneau film Tous les matins du monde about composers Sainte-Colombe and Marin Marais. His work on this film earned him a César award from the French film industry in 1992. The soundtrack has sold more than a million copies worldwide.

He has composed music for the following films:

- (1991) Tous les matins du monde (All the Mornings of the World) by Alain Corneau
- (1993) The Bird of Happiness (El pajaro de la felicidad) by Pilar Miró
- (1994) Joan the Maiden (Part 1: The Battles; Part 2: The Prisons) by Jacques Rivette
- (1997) Long Twilight (Hosszú alkony) by Attila Janisch
- (1997) Marquise by Véra Belmont
- (1998) Secret Defense (Top Secret) by Jacques Rivette
