= Barcelona Guitar Orchestra =

Classical guitar orchestra in Barcelona, Spain

- Native name: Orquesta de Guitarres de Barcelona
- Short name: OGB
- Founded: 1989
- Location: Barcelona, Spain
- Music director: Sergi Vicente
- Website: Barcelona Guitar Orchestra

The Barcelona Guitar Orchestra (Spanish: Orquesta de Guitarras de Barcelona) is a 25 chair orchestra of classical guitarists based in Barcelona, Spain. The repertoire of the orchestra ranges from Baroque to contemporary compositions with a heavy emphasis on Spanish music. In the more than thirty years since its founding, the orchestra has toured extensively throughout the world. It is considered an examplar of groups of its type.

== Origin ==
Music director Sergi Vicente was a guitar instructor at the Conservatori Superior de Música del Liceu in Barcelona. In 1989, he convened a group of eight guitarists at the conservatory to enhance their musical skills. This ensemble over time grew into the Barcelona Guitar Orchestra, with typically 25 members. Depending on the program, the orchestra includes piano accompanists and percussionists.

== Worldwide performances ==
The orchestra travels extensively, including tours to Europe, Russia, South America, and the United States (2009, 2011). It has performed at international guitar festivals in Barcelona (2001, 2002) and at the International Guitar Festival of Havana, Cuba (2000). In addition to maintaining close ties to its home at the Conservatori Superior de Música del Liceu, the orchestra has performed as part of the opera cycle of the Palau de la Música Catalana in Barcelona. Guest conductors have included composer and guitarist Leo Brouwer, who has composed pieces specifically for guitar ensemble. Other composers whose works are performed by the orchestra include Gaspar Sanz, Manuel de Falla and Isaac Albéniz.

== Guitar orchestra movement ==
Barcelona Guitar Orchestra is part of a growing number of guitar orchestras in the world. Representative examples include the Boston Guitar Orchestra, the Cambridge Guitar Orchestra, and the European Guitar and Mandolin Youth Orchestra. An article in Classical Guitar Review states that the Barcelona Guitar Orchestra is "the most successful ensemble of its kind".

== Discography ==
- Orquestra de Guitarres de Barcelona, 2001
- Guitar Orchestra of Barcelona – Concert Al Palau, 2004
