= Arianna Savall =

Spanish soprano, harpist, and composer (born 1972)

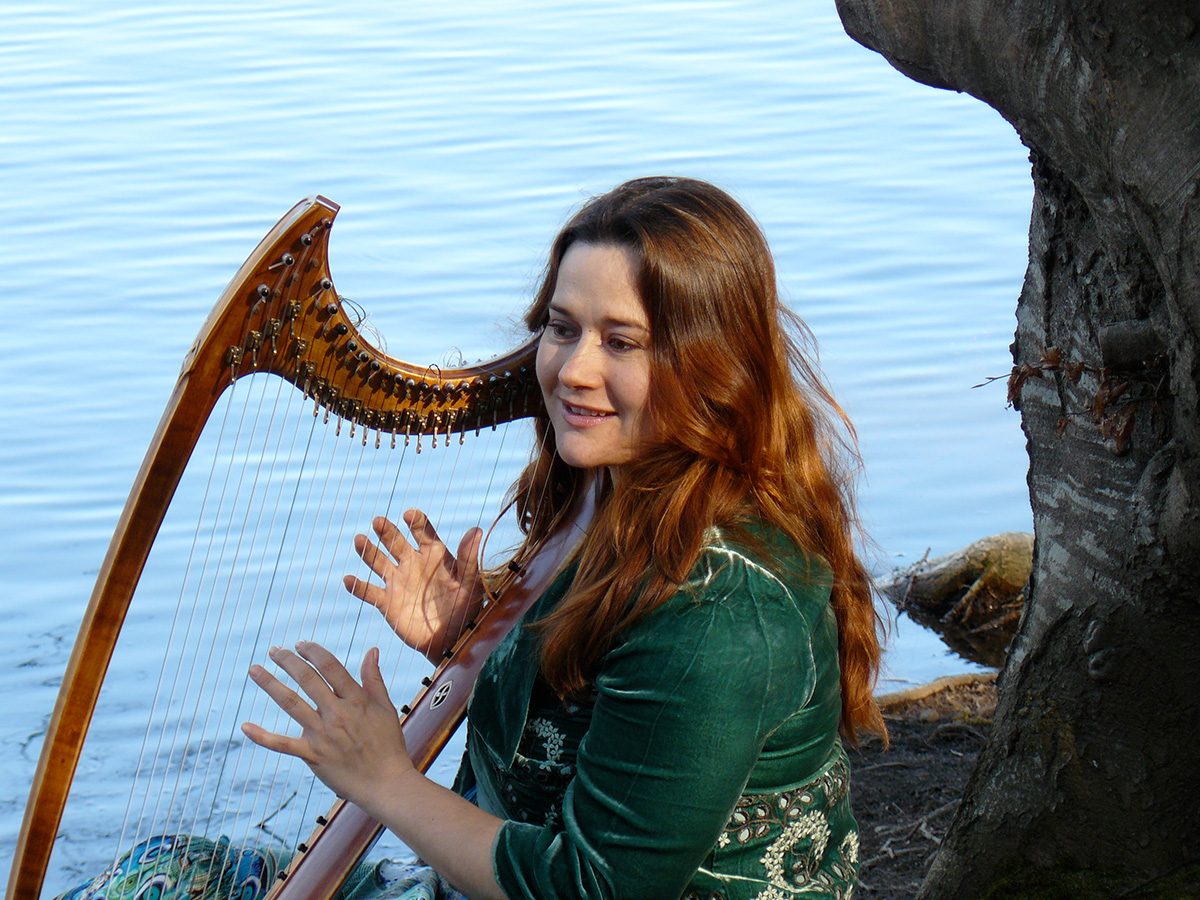

Arianna Savall i Figueras (born 1972 in Basel, Switzerland) is a Swiss-born Spanish classical singer, harpist and composer. She sings in Catalan, French, English, Spanish, Portuguese and other languages.

== Life and career ==
Savall is the daughter of composer and viol player Jordi Savall and the late singer Montserrat Figueras, and the sister of Ferran Savall. She studied voice at the Conservatory of Terrassa with María Dolores Aldea in 1993. She graduated in harp from the Conservatory of Terrassa, Spain, in 1996, and obtained a degree in voice in 2000. In 1992, she began studying with Rolf Lislevand at the Toulouse Conservatory.

In 1996, Savall returned to Switzerland and attended a seminar led by Kurt Widmer at the Schola Cantorum Basiliensis. She has been a member of Hespèrion XXI and was part of her father's musical groups until 2008, when she created her own group Hirundo Maris, together with the Norwegian musician Petter Udland Johansen. In 2017 she began teaching baroque harp at the Zurich University of the Arts.

== Discography ==
- Bella Terra, 2003
- Peiwoh (Alia Vox) 2009
- Chants du Sud et du Nord, 2012
- Le Labyrinthe d'Ariane, 2020
