= Renata Tarragó =

Catalan guitarist and vihuelist

- Renata Tarragó - Concierto de Aranjuez
- Born: Renata Tarragó Fábregas; October 23, 1927; Barcelona, Spain
- Died: August 2, 2005 (aged 77); Mataró, Spain
- Occupation: classical guitarist

Renata Tarragó Fábregas (23 October 1927 – 2 August 2005), a Catalan guitarist and vihuelist, was a teacher and performer, both as a solo artist and an accompanist. She was the first female guitarist to record Joaquín Rodrigo's Concierto de Aranjuez, and was the editor of the first published edition of the Concierto de Aranjuez score.

== Life and career ==
Tarragó was born in Barcelona, Spain, on 23 October 1927, the second of two children of Graciano Tarragó Pons, who was a musician, composer and teacher, and his first wife, Renata Fábregas. She studied at the Barcelona Conservatory, where her first teacher was her father, Graciano Tarragó (1892–1973), who had previously taught the soprano Victoria de los Ángeles, had studied the guitar under Miguel Llobet, and also played the violin and viola.

Renata Tarragó made her first public appearance at the age of 14, and was appointed an assistant professor at the Barcelona Conservatory upon the completion of her studies there in 1944. In 1951, the Barcelona Conservatory awarded Tarragó the "Premio Extraordinario" for her artistic accomplishments.

Tarragó played guitar accompaniment (with credits on the labels) on numerous His Master's Voice 78 and LP recordings with the soprano Victoria de los Ángeles, as well as a 1948 BBC recording in London of Manuel de Falla's La Vida Breve. In 1958, Tarragó became the first female guitarist to record Joaquín Rodrigo's Concierto de Aranjuez, in a recording accompanied by the Orquesta de Conciertos de Madrid, conducted by Odón Alonso. She also was the first to edit the Aranjuez score for publication (1959), and Rodrigo's esteem for her was evidenced by the dedication of his Sonata Giocosa (1960) to her. Her father, Graciano Tarragó, published the first edition of Rodrigo's Invocación y danza in 1962.

Renata Tarragó's repertoire ranged from music written for the vihuela and Baroque guitar to that of the twentieth century. Among her solo recordings are the works of Federico Moreno Torroba, Francisco Tárrega, Fernando Sor, Gaspar Sanz, Johann Sebastian Bach, and Luigi Boccherini. In 1962, she made the first recording of Torroba's Concierto de Castilla, accompanied by the Orquesta de Conciertos de Madrid, conducted by Jesús Arámbarri. Unlike the majority of classical guitarists, who play notes with their fingernails, Tarragó used her fingertips.

Tarragó concertized widely in Europe and abroad (including South Africa and the Soviet Union), and made her U.S. debut in 1960. In 1962, she represented Spain at the International Congress of the Guitar in Tokyo, and received a Gold Medal for her performances. During a 1962 concert at New York's Town Hall, she played both the vihuela and guitar, and the New York Times noted: "A musically sensitive performer, the beautiful Spanish artist explored the ranges of tonal subtlety and nuance."

In the 1968 film Deadfall, she appeared onscreen playing John Barry's Romance for Guitar and Orchestra in a concert scene, as well as on the soundtrack recording. The adagio from her recording of the Concierto de Aranjuez was used by Rex Nettleford and the National Dance Theatre Company of Jamaica for their dance piece, "Dialogue for Three".

Among the guitarists who studied with her are Jaume Abad (one of the founders of the Barcelona Guitar Quartet), Laura Almerich, Glorianne Collver-Jacobson, Ernesto Cordero, Darryl Denning and Michael Johnson.

Tarragó was married to Dr. José Antonio Osorio Gullón. She collapsed while swimming in Caldes d'Estrac, and died on 2 August 2005 in Mataró, Spain, at age 77.

== Reviews ==
- "No one in the world today plays Rodrigo's lovely Aranjuez better than Julian Bream, but even he doesn't play it as well as Renata Tarrago did on a now-deleted Columbia disc." (San Francisco Magazine, vol. 18, 1976)
- "[She] is a guitarist who tempers extreme technical skill with poetic sensitivity." (Oakland Tribune, 26 August 1962, p. 88)
- "The lovely and gifted Renata Tarrago plays Tarrega's music as one to the manner born." (Records in review, 1960)
- "No se trate de ningún reparo de monta dada la relevante calidad del disco que el soberano 'Concierto de Aranjuez' – sin discusión possible, la obra musical Española más hermosa de la postguerra – alcanza máxima y gran expresión por mano de la Orquesta de Conciertos de Madrid, el director Odón Alonso y la guitarrista Renata Tarragó." (Fernando Quiñones, "Música: tres importantes piezas españolas," Cuadernos Hispanoamericanos, no. 106, October 1958, p. 101)
- "En la señorita Renata Tarragó convergen grandes cualidades: exquisita sensibilidad y excelente formación musical, adquirida desde su infancia. Ambas le permiten abordar y enfrentarse con repertorio varlado, de diversas expresiones, como en el de este concierto." (Norberto Almandaz, "Recital de guitarra. Renata Tarragó," ABC de Sevilla, 19 November 1957, p. 36)
- "En su reciente jira por la acogedora Austria, los éxitos más apoteóticos jalonaron las actuaciones de Renata y Graciano Tarragó; éxitos que fueron aquilatados justamente por toda la crítica austríaca. Con ocasión de un concierto celebrado en el más fastuoso de los palacios de Viena, el más exigente de los críticos de esta ciudad prodigó a nuestros magníficos artistas unos elogios excepcionales, calificando a la gentil intérprete de «reina sin corona del Palacio Schoenbrunn».... El programa ... estuvo a cargo de Renata Tarragó que, con una claridad de estilo y una emoción de sentida y seria interpretación fidelísima, nos ofreció unas versiones intensas, ricas en contrastados colores acústicos, de las citadas composiciones. Su técnica magistral, su delicadeza y suavidad en la pulsación, el sonido limpio, diáfano, perlado de su guitarra y el tótal dominio de matices junto a su exquisite sensibilidad, contribuyeron a que su actuación fuera premiada con entusiastas ovaciones. Pocas veces nos es dable atender an intérpretes tan calificados como Renata Tarragó." (El Mundo Deportivo, 29 January 1956, p. 2)

== Recordings ==
- With Victoria de los Ángeles:
  - El testament d'amelia; Catalonia, traditional (The Gramophone Co., n.d.)
  - Tengo que subir; Asturias, traditional (The Gramophone Co., n.d.)
  - Playera; Andalusia, traditional (The Gramophone Co., n.d.)
  - Seventeen traditional songs of Spain (His Master's Voice, 1950s)
  - El cant des ocells; Catalonia; Din dan boleran (His Master's Voice, 1950s)
  - Canción de trilla; Parado de Valldemosa: bolero-Mallorca; Nik baditud; Andregaya: Vascongadas (His Master's Voice, 1951)
  - Ahí tienes mi corazón fandango castellano-León; La ví llorando: Castilla la Vieja-Santander; Ya se van los pastores: Castilla la Vieja-Soria (His Master's Voice, 1951)
  - Si quieres saber coplas granadinas, Andalucía; Playera: Andalucía (His Master's Voice, 1951)
  - El rossinyol; El testament d'Amelia; Cataluña (His Master's Voice, 1951)
  - Campanas de Belén Jaeneras que yo canto: Andalucía; A dormir ahora mesmo: canción de cuna: Murcia (His Master's Voice, 1951)
  - Adiós meu homino Miña nay por me casare: Galicia, tradicional; Tengo que subir: Asturias, tradicional (His Master's Voice, 1952)
  - Chants folkloriques espagnols (1952)
  - Spanish songs (RCA Victor, 1954)
  - Canciones populares españolas (His Master's Voice, 1958)
  - Canciones populares españolas Selección n. 1 (Odeón, 1960)
  - Canciones populares españolas Selección n. 2 (Odeón, 1960)
  - 17 chants folkloriques espagnols (His Master's Voice, 1960s)
- With Graciano Tarragó:
  - Dos guitarras españolas (Hispavox, 1958)
- Solo:
  - Música española para guitarra: Autores antiguos, Obras de Fernando Sor (Hispavox, 1958)
  - Homenaje a Tárrega (Hispavox, 1958)
  - Concierto de Aranjuez para guitarra y orquesta (Hispavox, 1958; Columbia, 1959)
  - Guitarra española suite (Columbia, 1959)
  - Concierto de Castilla (Columbia, 1962)
  - Zarabanda y double guitarra (Hispavox, 1963)
  - Quintet, no. 1, in D major, op. 37, for guitar and string quartet, and Quintet no. 3, in E minor, op. 50, no. 3, for guitar and string quartet (Musical Heritage Society, 1964)
  - Música del Renacimiento español (Vergara, 1965)
  - Deadfall: Original Motion Picture Soundtrack (20th Century Fox Records, 1968)
