= Luisa Lacal de Bracho =

Spanish pianist, musicologist, and writer (1874–1962)

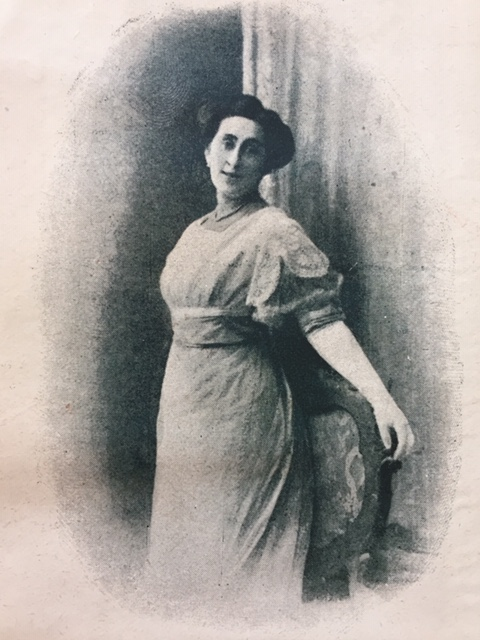
- Born: María Luisa Lacal Infanzón c. 1874; Madrid, Spain
- Died: 1962; Madrid, Spain
- Education: Conservatori Superior de Música del Liceu
- Occupations: pianist, musicologist, lexicographer and writer
- Spouse: Carlos Bracho Jiménez (m. 1900)
- Relatives: Eva Canel (cousin)
- Writing career
- Notable works: Diccionario de la música, técnico histórico, bio-bibliográfico, publicado (1899)
- Notable awards: Gold Medal at the 1888 Barcelona Universal Exposition; Civil Order of Alfonso XII
- Movement: Sociedad General de Autores y Editores

Luisa Lacal de Bracho (née María Luisa Lacal Infanzón, 1874–1962) was a Spanish pianist, musicologist, lexicographer and writer. She was the author of the first dictionary of musical terminology by a Spanish woman.

== Biography ==
Luisa Lacal de Bracho was born in Madrid in 1874 to Amalia Infanzón Igaraiburu, aunt of Eva Canel, and Saturnino Lacal, secretary of the Moderate Party of Isabella II. Her father was also a member of the third squadron of the National Militia, formed by the Spanish nobility and upper bourgeoisie for the restoration of Alfonso XII. Coming from a bourgeois, conservative and monarchist family, she began her musical education at an early age. She gave her first musical recital at the age of 13.

No later than 1883, de Bracho's family moved to Barcelona where she continued her piano studies at the Conservatori Superior de Música del Liceu. She was recognized with various prizes for her concerts, such as the Gold Medal at the 1888 Barcelona Universal Exposition and First Prize and Grand Medal of the Royal Conservatory of Barcelona in 1890. Along with this, she gave musical lectures and was appointed as a teacher and part of the faculty of the conservatory in the 1890–91 academic year. She finished her piano studies at the National Conservatory of Madrid.

While developing her repertoire between 1894 and 1899, de Bracho performed as a concert pianist and participated as a member of the Red Cross in various charitable activities and also in events for the Sociedad General de Autores y Editores (the Spanish Society of Authors and Publishers) as an honorary member. In 1900, she married Carlos Bracho Jiménez, a professor in the military riding corps and also a member of the Red Cross. Through the next several years, she moved between various Spanish cities, though she continued her work as a concert pianist.

In 1899, de Bracho wrote Diccionario de la música, técnico histórico, bio-bibliográfico, publicado (Technical, historical, bio-bibliographical Dictionary of music), which was the first dictionary of musical terminology by a Spanish woman. It received widespread acclaim at the time of publication and was reprinted several times.

In 1900, she married Carlos Bracho Jiménez and they adopted three children together.

In 1909, de Bracho was appointed to the Civil Order of Alfonso XII.

De Bracho later published two novels, Trinar de amores (Lovers' Chirping), in 1921, a collections of short stories that she had been publishing in the specialized magazine Gloria Femenina throughout the 1920s, and Peregrina de la ilusión (Pilgrim of Illusion) in 1929. She was known for writing in a simple and direct style with rhythmic descriptions. Her novels were adapted into radio plays.

De Bracho died in 1962 in Madrid.
