= Carlo del Monte =

Spanish musician

Heleni Barjau i Vallmitjana (Barcelona, 1921 - Mexico City, 2000), was a Catalan tenor noted for his recordings of La Traviata and Il trittico with Victoria de los Ángeles. Though born in Spain, he fled to Mexico with his family in 1939. He is professionally known as Carlo del Monte.
