= Deadfall (1968 film) =

1968 British film by Bryan Forbes

- Original theatrical poster
- Directed by: Bryan Forbes
- Written by: Bryan Forbes
- Based on: "Deadfall" by Desmond Cory
- Produced by: Paul Monash
- Starring: Michael Caine; Giovanna Ralli; Eric Portman; Nanette Newman; David Buck; Carlos Pierre
- Cinematography: Gerry Turpin
- Edited by: John Jympson
- Music by: John Barry
- Production company: Salamander Film Productions
- Distributed by: 20th Century Fox
- Release dates: 11 September 1968 (USA); October 1968 (UK)
- Running time: 120 minutes
- Country: United Kingdom
- Language: English

Deadfall is a 1968 British neo noir crime film based on Desmond Cory's 1965 thriller of the same name. The film was written and directed by Bryan Forbes and stars Michael Caine, Eric Portman, Giovanna Ralli and Forbes's wife Nanette Newman, with music by John Barry in his final collaboration with Forbes. Barry also plays a musical conductor in the film. The film's theme song, "My Love Has Two Faces", was performed by Shirley Bassey. The film was shot in and around Mallorca, Spain.

== Plot ==
Cat burglar Henry Clarke checks himself into a Spanish sanatorium for alcoholics under a false pretence. His true motivation is to get closer to a wealthy patient named Salinas and then rob his magnificent house.

Clarke is approached by Fé Moreau and her much older husband, Richard, to form a criminal alliance. As a test run before the real robbery, they break into another stately home. After risking his life on a ledge, Clarke becomes so angered by Richard's failure to crack the safe that, with great effort, he drags the entire safe and its contents out of the house.

Fé and Clarke begin a romantic affair, which Richard, who has a young male lover, does not discourage. Fé buys a new E-Type Jaguar (known as XK-E in the USA) convertible for Clarke and tells him the safe contained jewels worth at least $500,000.

Before the time comes to rob Salinas's mansion, Fé travels to Tangier without letting Clarke know she was leaving. Richard then tells Clarke a harrowing tale of how he once betrayed his male lover to the Nazis and later impregnated the man's wife. Their baby was Fé, but, choosing not to tell her that she was his daughter, Richard married her.

A contemptuous Clarke decides to break into Salinas's mansion on his own. Fé returns and is shocked when a suicidal and depressed Richard reveals the truth about their relationship. She races to the Salinas mansion and inadvertently alerts a guard, who shoots Clarke coming out of a window at the same moment that Richard commits suicide with a pistol at home. Clarke falls to his death and Fé rushes to his body.

Fé attends a funeral. Afterwards, she is led off by police while Richard's homosexual lover drives off in Clarke's car.

== Cast ==
- Michael Caine as Henry Clarke
- Giovanna Ralli as Fé Moreau
- Eric Portman as Richard Moreau
- Nanette Newman as The Girl
- Vladek Sheybal as Dr. Delgado
- Emilio Rodríguez as Police Captain (as Emilio Rodriguez)
- David Buck as Salinas
- Carmen Dene as Masseuse
- Geraldine Sherman as Receptionist
- Leonard Rossiter as Fillmore
- Reg Howell as Spanish Chauffeur
- John Barry as Orchestra Conductor
- Renata Tarragó as Solo Guitarist (as Renata Tarrago)
- Carlos Pierre as Antonio
- Santiago Rivero as Armed Guard

== Reception ==
Vincent Canby gave the film a mostly-positive review in the New York Times, writing:

I've lived more than four decades without getting any closer to a cat burglar than reading about Murph the Surf in the newspapers. However, if one is to believe the movies???--and I always want to, cat burglary is one of the world's most popular and lucrative professions, if not quite the most exciting.

In the Chicago Sun-Times, Roger Ebert gave the film 2 out of 4 stars, writing:

[The] film should have either been about the burglary or about romantic intrigues, not about both. That was one trouble with The Thomas Crown Affair. Another distraction in Deadfall is Gerry Turpin’s photography. He's constantly changing the focus so you first see something in the foreground, and then you see something in the background... If directors would only be content to make a good, simple thievery movie, how happy we could be.

=== Box office ===
According to Fox records the film needed to take in $5,350,000 in rentals to break even; however by 11 December 1970 it had taken in only $2,575,000, and therefore was a loss for the studio.

== Soundtrack ==
- "My Love Has Two Faces," Music by John Barry, Lyrics by Jack Lawrence, Sung by Shirley Bassey
- "Romance for Guitar and Orchestra," Composed and conducted by John Barry, Performed by Renata Tarragó
- "Beat Girl," Composed by John Barry
