= Ricard Lamote de Grignon =

Catalan Spanish composer and orchestral conductor

Ricard Lamote de Grignon i Ribas (Catalan pronunciation: [riˈkaɾd ləˈmɔd də ɡɾiˈɲɔn]; 25 September 1899 – 5 February 1962) was a Catalan Spanish composer and orchestral conductor.

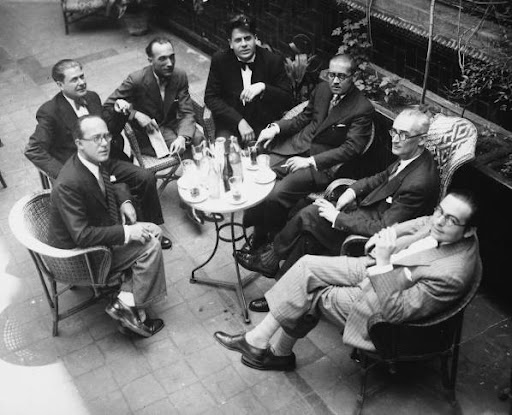
Members of the 'group of eight' or 'independent composers' of Catalunya. Left to right: Robert Gerhard, Agustí Grau, Joan Gibert Camins, Eduard Toldrà, Manuel Blancafort, Baltasar Sampar and Ricard Lamote de Grignon. Missing is Frederic Mompou. (1931)

Ricard Lamote de Grignon was born and died in Barcelona. He was the only son of the composer Joan Lamote de Grignon and Florentina Ribas. He was initiated into the world of music by his father, then later studied at the Conservatori Superior de Música del Liceu and at the Academia Marshall, both in Barcelona. At the age of 20 he joined the Barcelona Symphony Orchestra and the Gran Teatre del Liceu as a cellist. In 1930 he was appointed director of the Girona Symphony Orchestra and in 1932 he won the appointment as assistant conductor of the Barcelona Municipal Band.

At the onset of the Spanish Civil War he fled to Valencia to join his father, working alongside him as assistant director of the newly created Municipal Orchestra. In 1948 he returned to Barcelona but, finding it impossible to regain his place as director of the Municipal Band, dedicated himself to musical composition and study. In 1957 he occupied the post of deputy director of the Municipal Orchestra, collaborating with his great friend Eduard Toldrà until his death in 1962.

== Important works ==
His work includes many pieces for piano, symphonic poems, also chamber music and music for choir with symphony orchestra, not forgetting his additions to the repertoire of sardana dance and band music.

- Symphonic works like Facècia (1936) which was awarded the Juli Garreta prize in 1938, Dos Petits Poemes, Cartell Simfònic (1936), Tres Sonates del Pare Soler or Simfonia Catalana (1950), among others, and Concierto Mágico, music for the film of the same name and Tríptico de la Piel de Toro, for piano and orchestra.
- Ballets like El Rusc, first performed at the Gran Teatro del Liceo, Somnis (1929) and Un Prat, dedicated to his "father and maestro" and Divertimento (1936) for symphonic jazz orchestra.
- Large-scale operas like La Cabeza del Dragón (1939), first performed in 1959, with libretto by Valle-Inclán, and chamber operas like Le Petit Chaperon Vert, with French text by Marià Camí, or Mágia, whose libretto he wrote himself, first performed in 1952, and a children's opera, La Flor, which premiered in 1934 and was performed again on several occasions.
- The symphonic poem Enigmes won the Premio Ciutat de Barcelona in 1950, as did his posthumous work El Càntic dels Càntics, completed before his death in 1962.
- Vocal music includes works for voice and piano on poems by Carner and Maragall, among others, and choral pieces like Romance del Caballero, and the harmonisation of traditional songs.
- Small works for piano and several pieces for different instrumental ensembles like: Toccata, which was awarded the Premio Santa Llúcia, 1957 de Juventudes Musicales; the work Goya, Six unpleasant pieces for ten soloists; and a series of pieces for different wind ensembles entitled Miniatures, designed as pre-rehearsal exercises for the instrumentalists of the Orquesta de Valencia.
- Sardanes for Cobla: Amical, Camí de Llum, Nupcial, El Noguer, El Mas, Sant Elm and Enyor.

The archive of the Lamote de Grignon family, with works by Ricard and his father Joan, is at the Musical Document Repository of the Generalitat of Catalunya and may be studied in the Biblioteca de Catalunya.

== Music ==
- GOYA: Six unpleasant pieces for 10 soloists

== Bibliography ==
- Calmell, Cèsar (1999). Centenari Ricard Lamote de Grignon (1899–1999). Barcelona: Generalitat de Catalunya, Departament de Cultur. ISBN 84-393-4915-7.
- Coll, Montserrat (1989). Lamote de Grignon. Barcelona: Nou Art Thor. ISBN 84-7327-204-8.

== Recordings ==
- GOYA: Six unpleasant pieces for 10 soloists Barcino Ensemble, Adolphe Pla (director)
