= Culture of Barcelona =

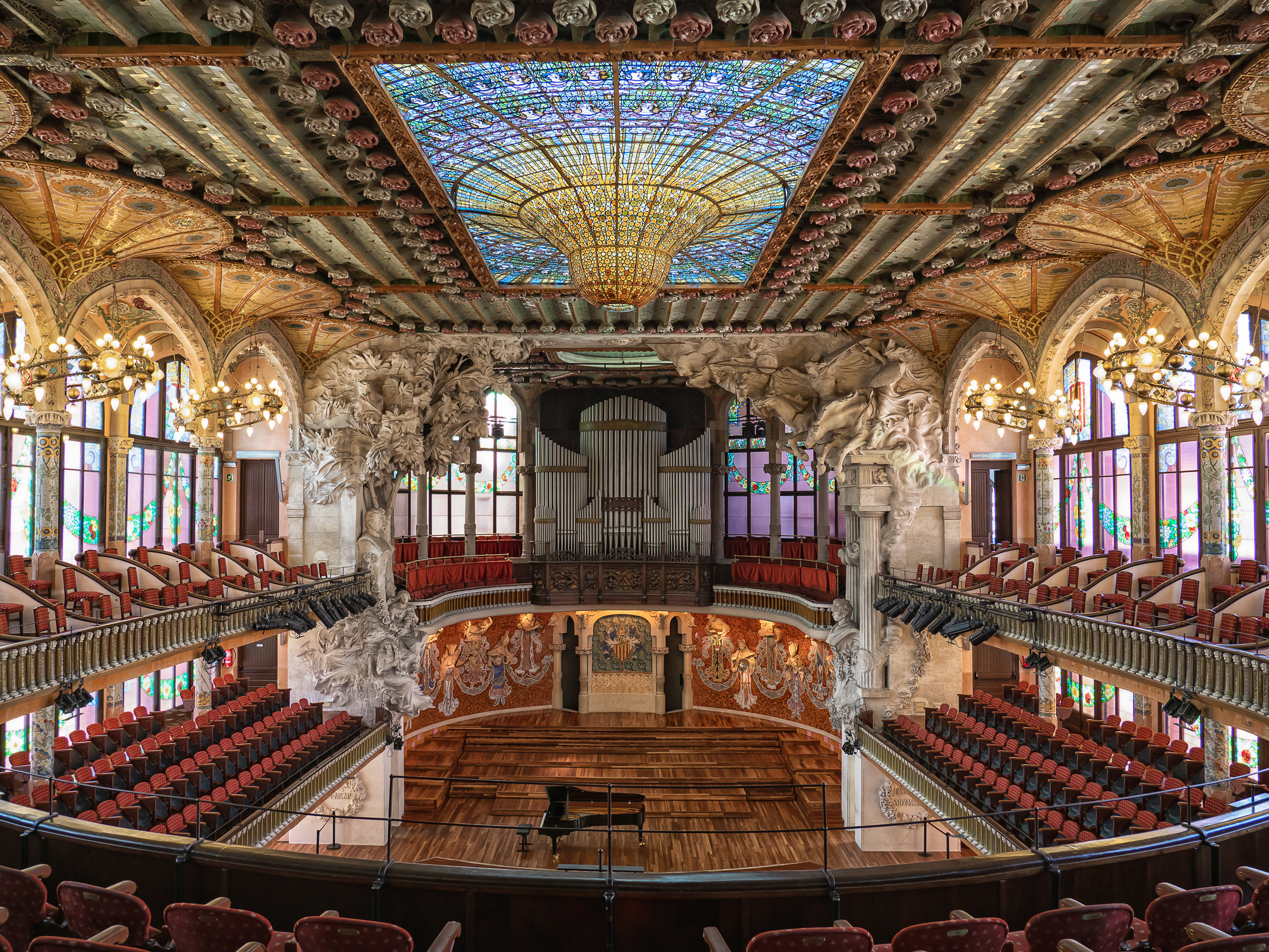
Palau de la Música Catalana, one of the city's most renowned architectural gems.

Barcelona's culture stems from the city's 2000 years of history. Barcelona has historically been a cultural center of reference in the world. To a greater extent than the rest of Catalonia, where Catalonia's native language Catalan is more dominant, Barcelona is a bilingual city: Catalan and Spanish are both official and widely spoken. Since the arrival of democracy, the Catalan culture (very much repressed during the dictatorship) has experienced a rebirth, both by recovering works from the past and by stimulating the creation of new works. Barcelona is an international hub of highly active and diverse cultural life with theatres, concert halls, cinemas, museums, and high-value architectural heritage.

== Museums ==
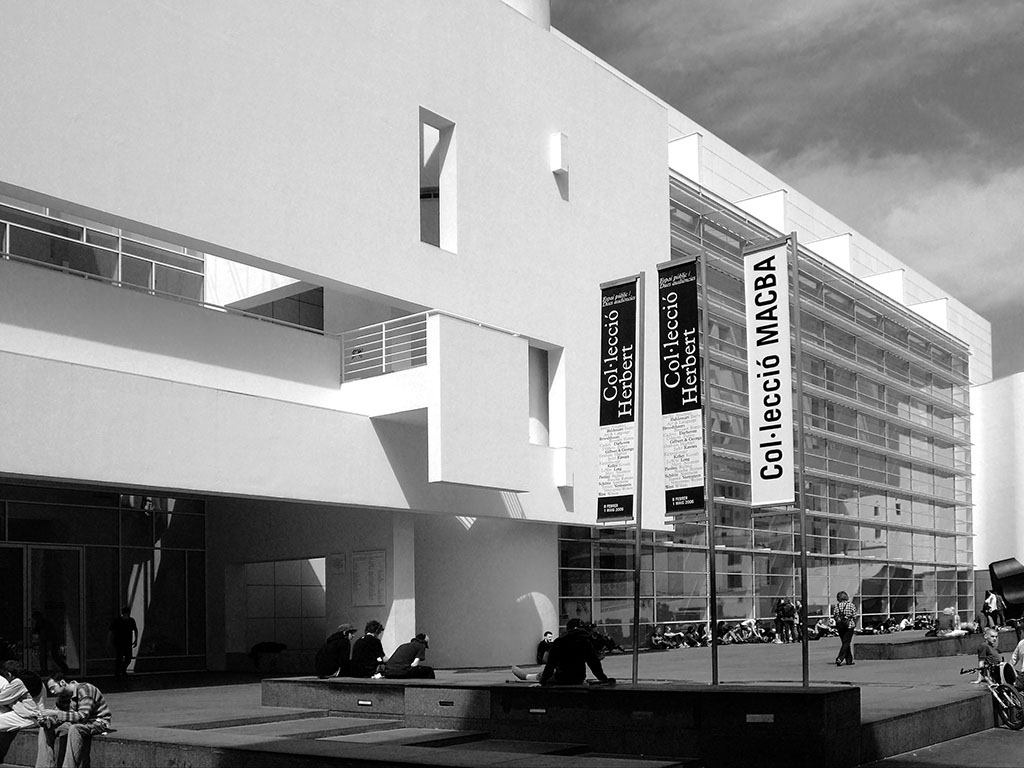
Barcelona Museum of Contemporary Art (MACBA), in El Raval (Ciutat Vella)

Barcelona houses a great number of museums, which cover different areas and eras. The City History Museum, situated in a medieval building that used to be a royal residence, explains the story of the city, and includes a visit to the Roman ruins in the museum's basement. It also comprises the Museum-Monastery of Pedralbes, one of the best examples of Catalan Gothic architecture, the Museum-House Verdaguer, dedicated to poet Jacint Verdaguer, the Park Güell Interpretation Centre and several other minor sites.

The Museum of the History of Catalonia, opened in 1996, covers the story of Catalonia since prehistoric times and administers the monuments that belong to the Generalitat de Catalunya. The Archaeology Museum of Catalonia covers the story of Catalonia up to the Middle Ages, and of the cultures it came into contact with, and also runs several other archaeological sites in Catalonia.

The National Museum of Art of Catalonia possesses a well-known collection of Romanesque art, including wall-paintings from Romanesque churches and chapels around Catalonia that have been transferred to the museum, Gothic art from the 13th–15th centuries, Renaissance and Baroque art from the 16th-18th centuries, Modern art from the 19th century and the first decades of the 20th century, as well as the Thyssen-Bornemisza Collection.

The Barcelona Museum of Contemporary Art, usually known as MACBA (acronym of Museu d'Art Contemporani de Barcelona), focuses on post-1945 Catalan and Spanish art, though it also includes foreign works. Adjacent to the MACBA, the Centre de Cultura Contemporània de Barcelona, or CCCB, hosts temporary exhibitions, a cinema, concerts and acts as a key cultural hub for the city.

The works of Joan Miró are found in the museum of the Fundació Joan Miró, together with guest exhibitions from other museums around the world, while the Picasso Museum features early works by Pablo Picasso and his Las Meninas series. The Fundació Antoni Tàpies holds a collection of Tàpies works.

CaixaForum Barcelona is an important art complex focused on temporary exhibitions and a wide array of cultural activities. The museum complex, once a factory designed by modernist architect Josep Puig i Cadalfalch, was renovated by Arata Isozaki to include 3 exhibition rooms and an auditorium. Despite its focus on temporary exhibitions, CaixaForum also houses permanent interventions by Sol Le Witt, Lucio Fontana and Joseph Beuys.

The Erotic Museum of Barcelona is the first museum of erotic art and culture where the visitor can contemplate the development of eroticism through the various artistic and cultural facets of the human being. The Museum's assets consist of more than 800 pieces of great historical value, spanning various cultures' erotic manifestations of both a ritual/religious as well as recreational nature.

The Museu Marítim de Barcelona, founded in 1929, is a nautical museum situated in historical Barcelona's Royal Shipyard complex, with the purpose of illustrating Catalan seafaring culture and maritime history. CosmoCaixa (formerly the Science Museum) is a science museum run by La Caixa Foundation that received the European Museum of the Year Award in 2006.

== Architecture ==
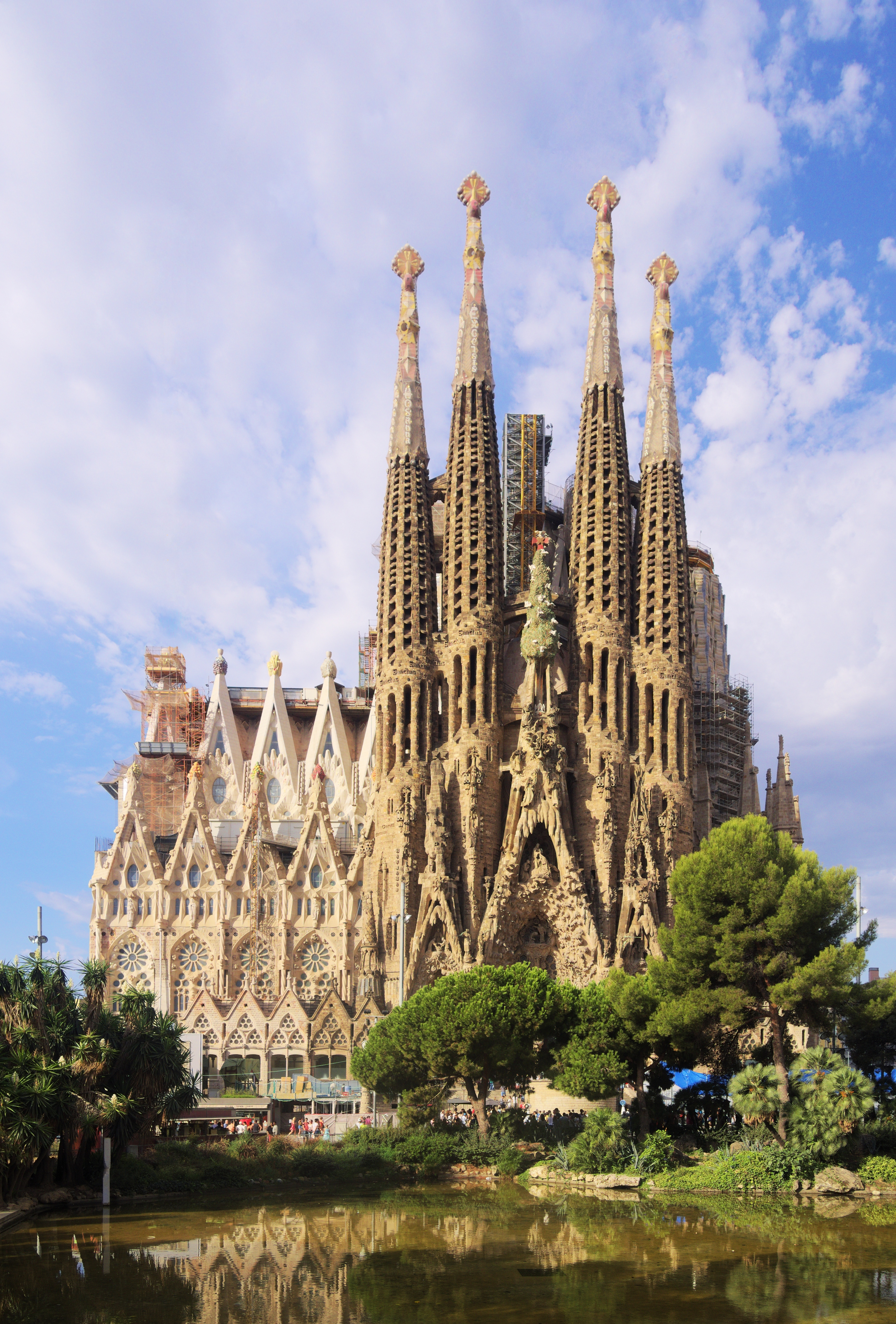
The Sagrada Família church

The Barri Gòtic ("Gothic Quarter" in Catalan) is the center of the old city of Barcelona. Many of the buildings date from medieval times, some from as far back as the Roman settlement of Barcelona. Other historical areas include El Raval and El Born.

Catalan Modernisme architecture (often known as Art Nouveau in the rest of Europe), developed between 1885 and 1950 and left an important legacy in Barcelona. A great number of these buildings are World Heritage Sites. Especially remarkable is the work of architect Antoni Gaudí, which can be seen throughout the city. His best known work is the immense but still unfinished church of the Sagrada Família, which has been under construction since 1882, and is still financed by private donations: as of 2007, completion is planned for 2026. Other examples of his work are the Palau Güell, the Park Güell, the Casa Milà (La Pedrera) and the Casa Batlló. Many turn-of-the-century buildings were constructed in the context of the huge widening of the city which came with the construction of Eixample and the incorporation of other municipalities into a larger Barcelona. This was based on Ildefons Cerdà's linear mid-19th century urban plan, which was revolutionary at the time and which is still notable for allowing new architecture to be built on unused ground.

Another notable architect was Lluís Domènech i Montaner, who designed the Palau de la Música Catalana, the Hospital de Sant Pau and the Casa Lleó Morera. Josep Puig i Cadafalch's Casa Amatller can also be seen on Passeig de Gràcia. Adolf Florensa, one of the first architects to adapt structures from the Chicago School, was in charge of many original works in Via Laietana, the Palace of Communications and Transports of the 1929 World Exposition and most especially the new urban plan of the Gothic Quarter.

The 1929 world exposition also brought to Barcelona the work of german architect Ludwig Mies Van der Rohe who designed the German pavilion of the exhibition, reconstructed in 1986, an important building in the history of modern architecture, known for its simple form and its spectacular use of extravagant materials.

Since the constructive work done for the 1992 Summer Olympics and with grand-scale urban regeneration taking place in time for the 2004 Universal Forum of Cultures, Barcelona has become a center for avant-garde architecture, starting with the Hotel Arts and its twin the Torre Mapfre. Among those works, the Torre Agbar is one of the ones that has caused more disparaging opinions. As a result of its unusual shape, the building is known by several nicknames such as "l'obús" (the shell), "el supositori" (the suppository), and some more eschatological ones.

Barcelona won the 1999 RIBA Royal Gold Medal for its architecture, the first (and as of 2011, only) time that the winner has been a city, and not an individual architect.

=== World Heritage Sites in Barcelona ===
- Works of Lluís Domènech i Montaner, Palau de la Música Catalana and Hospital de Sant Pau, included in the list in 1997.
- Works of Antoni Gaudí, including Park Güell, Palau Güell, Casa Milà, Casa Vicens, Sagrada Família (Nativity façade and crypt), Casa Batlló, and the crypt at the Church of Colònia Güell. The first three works were inscribed as a World Heritage Site in 1984. The other four were added as extensions to the site in 2005.

== Performing arts ==
L'Auditori

Barcelona has many venues for live music and theatre, including the world-renowned Gran Teatre del Liceu opera theatre, the Teatre Nacional de Catalunya, L'Auditori, the several venues of Teatre Lliure and the Palau de la Música Catalana concert hall. Other theaters include the Teatre Poliorama. The GREC festival takes place every summer and brings highly renowned performers and companies to Barcelona.

Barcelona is home to the Sónar Music Festival as well as the Primavera Sound Festival which both take place around May and June every year. Sónar is an electronica music festival split into three days with two main events on each day (Sónar By Night and Sónar by Day). Sónar by day is held close to Les Rambles, whereas Sonar by night takes place in a complex just outside the main city. Primavera Sound is more focused on a broader programming with also guitar rock and indie rock related music. This festival is held in Parc del Fòrum and the black/blue triangled building of the Auditorium straight across where Sónar is held.

The Barcelona Symphony and Catalonia National Orchestra (Orquestra Simfònica de Barcelona i Nacional de Catalunya, usually known as OBC) is the largest symphonic orchestra in Catalonia. Founded by the violinist and conductor Eduard Toldrà in 1944 as Barcelona's Municipal Orchestra, it became the OBC in the 1994-95 season after the Generalitat de Catalunya and Barcelona's City Council constituted the OBC consortium. In 1999, the OBC inaugurated its new venue in the brand-new L'Auditori). It performs around 75 concerts per season and its current director is Eiji Oue.

== Other cultural centres ==
In addition to museums and galleries, the Barcelona city council runs a scheme involving converted factories, warehouses and other industrial buildings. They have been turned recently into cultural centres named "Art Factories". Among others, they include the former textile factories Fabra i Coats, Hangar (part of former Can Ricart industrial estate) and La Escocesa, the paint factory Nau Ivanow, Hangar, and the medieval mint of the crown of Aragon, La Seca.

== Film ==
The Filmoteca de Catalunya is Catalonia's central film archive, with a library and projection rooms. Its old location at Avinguda de Sarrià, in Eixample, was replaced by a new building in El Raval during early 2011 which includes a specialised library for film researchers. The film prizes Premi Nacional de Cinema, Sant Jordi Awards and Gaudí Awards are awarded in Barcelona and promote local productions in both official languages of the community. There are also several film schools, among which the prestigious Escola Superior de Cinema i Audiovisuals de Catalunya (ESCAC), which is located in Terrassa but is a private member of the University of Barcelona.

Although not in Barcelona proper, nearby coastal town Sitges hosts every year the Sitges Film Festival, focusing on horror and fantasy productions.

== Libraries and archives ==
The National Library of Catalonia is the central library in the city, but there's a large network of public services and cultural centres scattered around the city which is owned by the Diputació de Barcelona, as well as many private libraries and libraries belonging to institutions such as universities.

== Higher education ==
The Barcelona urban area includes several universities. There are four public universities: Universitat de Barcelona (UB), Universitat Autònoma de Barcelona (UAB), Universitat Pompeu Fabra (UPF) and Universitat Politècnica de Catalunya (UPC). Among the private: Universitat Internacional de Catalunya (UIC), Universitat Ramon Llull (URL), Universitat Abat Oliva (UAO), Fundació Blanquerna or the distance university Universitat Oberta de Catalunya (UOC). Barcelona is also the seat of the network Instituto de Altos Estudios Universitarios (IAEU), which offers postgraduate programmes. Other institutions offer such courses. MACBA, the city's contemporary art institution, has a postgraduate programme known as Independent Studies Programme. A summer university, the Progressive Summer University of Catalonia, takes places every year in the UB campus. Among the city's design and art schools, Escola Llotja, Eina or Elisava are some of the most important. The world-prestigious ESADE headquarters is in Barcelona, which hosts business students from around the world and offers an additional program in Spanish for professionals in all industries.

== See also ==
- Fashion in Barcelona
- Public art in Barcelona
- Religion in Barcelona
- Sport in Barcelona
- Traditions of Catalonia
