= Eduard Toldrà =

Spanish Catalan composer and conductor

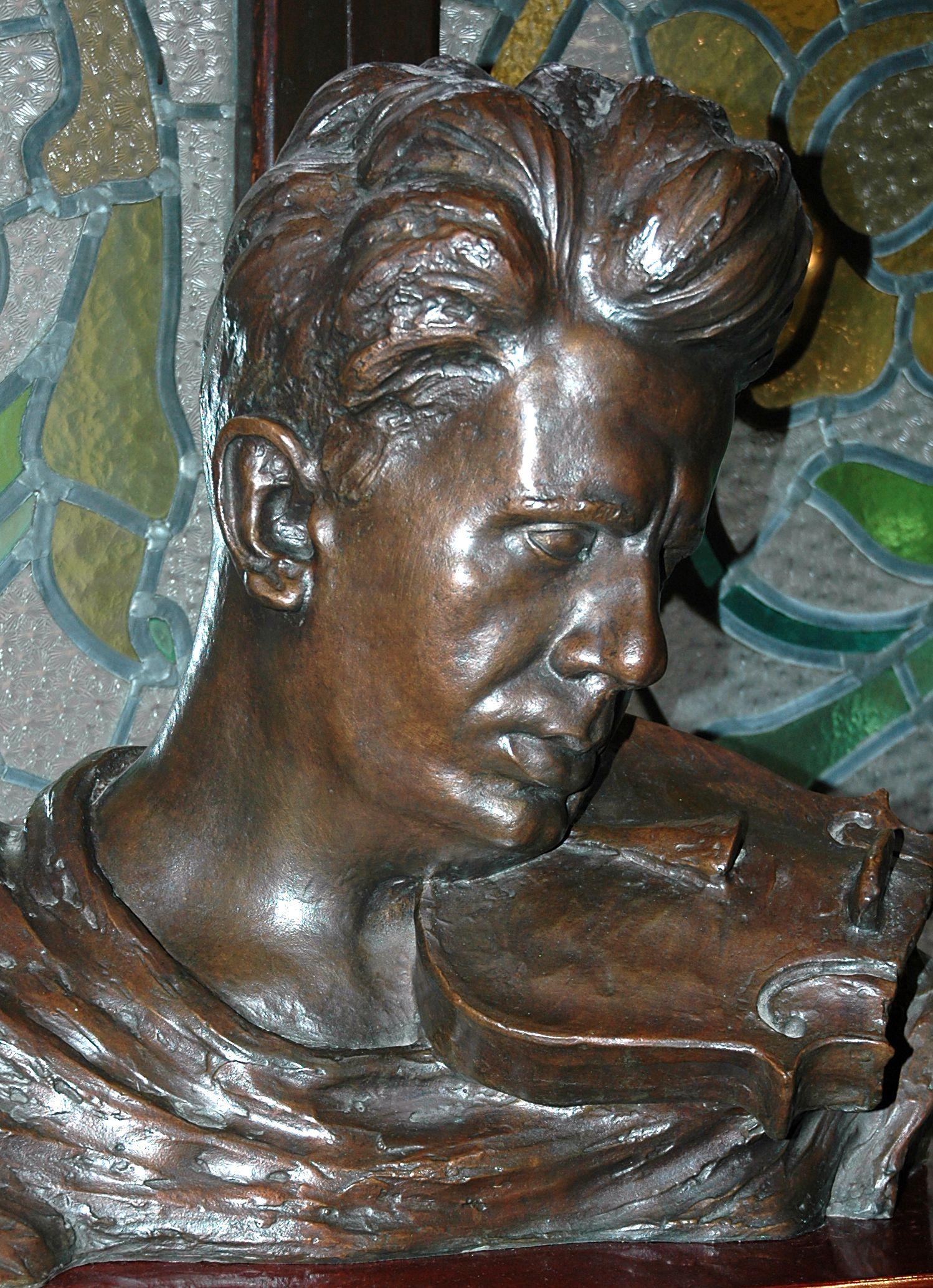
sculpture of Eduard Toldrà

Eduard Toldrà Soler (Catalan pronunciation: [əðuˈaɾt tulˈdɾa]; Vilanova i la Geltrú 7 April 1895 – Barcelona, 31 May 1962) was a Spanish Catalan composer and conductor.

Toldrà played an important role in the Culture of Barcelona. In 1944 he founded the Barcelona Symphony Orchestra at the Palau de la Música Catalana, where his deputy in 1957 was his friend Ricardo Lamote de Grignon. Toldrà was a regular juror on the Maria Canals International Music Competition. His students included Antoni Ros-Marbà and Xavier Montsalvatge.

The personal papers of Eduard Toldrà are preserved in the Biblioteca de Catalunya.

== Works ==
translation of ca.wikipedia listing

=== Theatrical ===
- 1924 four musical illustrations for the play de Lluís Masriera: Un idil·li prop del cel o, pel juny, carabasses.
- 1928 El giravolt de maig – The May Sunflower, comic opera in one act with libretto by Josep Carner
- 1951 Oh, Tossa!, hymn for the theatrical spectacle by Joan Oliver: Quasi un paradís – almost paradise.

=== Chamber music ===
- 1914 Quartet in C minor, for string quartet
- 1920 Vistes al mar – sea views, for string quartet, later arranged for chamber orchestra
- 1921 Six sonnets, for violin and piano. One of them, Ave Maria, also adapted for orchestra
- 1931 Les danses de Vilanova, for string quartet, piano and bass, adaption of the glossa of 1921

=== Symphonic music ===
- 1919 Suite in E Major
- 1926 Empúries (Invocacion to Empordà) a sardana lliure for orchestra
- 1930 La maledicció del comte Arnau The Curse of Count Arnau, lyrical impression for orchestra, from the sardana of 1926
- 1934 La filla del marxant – the merchant's daughter, suite written for the drama in three acts of Adrià Gual Lionor o la filla del marxant.

=== Songs ===
In the opinion of Michael Oliver the songs of Toldrá are "mostly brief, simple and warmly lyrical, often with a touch of what Mompou has called 'urban popularism'" For piano accompaniment unless orchestra indicated.

- 1915 Menta i farigola – Ca. mint and thyme; El rei Lear – King Lear; Els obercocs Ca.; Les petites collidores – the little collectors (Josep Carner), Festeig – Ca. courtship; Romança sense paraules – song without words (Joan Maragall)
- 1916 Matinal – morning (Maragall)
- 1920 L'hort (Maragall); Maig – May; Abril – April; Cançó d'un bell amor – song of a sweet love (Trinitat Catasús)
- 1923 Canticel (Carner); Les garbes dormen al camp – the sheaves sleep in the field (Josep Maria de Sagarra)
- 1924 A l'ombra del lledoner – Ca. in the shadow of a hackberry bush (Tomàs Garcés) for voice and orchestra; Romanç de santa Llúcia – Song of Saint Lucia; Vinyes verdes vora el mar (Sagarra)
- 1925 El gessamí i la rosa – the jasmine and the rose (Carner); Cançó de l'amor que passa – song of love which passes (Garcés)
- 1926 A muntanya, Cocorococ! – in a mountain, cuckoo!; Recança – Regret (Carner); Camins de fada – Sp. fairy paths (Garcés); Cançó de vela – song of sailing (Sagarra)
- 1927 Garba, Concepció Rabell prize cycle of six songs: Platxèria Ca. (Salvat-Papasseit), La mar estava alegre – Sp. the sea was glad (Maragall), Cançó incerta – uncertain song (Carner), Cançó de l'oblit – song of forgetting (Garcés), Cançó de passar cantant – song of passing by singing (Sagarra); Anacreòntica – Anacreontic fragments (Clementina Arderiu) with version for voice and orchestra.
- 1929 Floreix l'ametller = Ca. the almond tree flowers, Esplai recreation (Ignasi Iglésias); Divendres Sant – Ca. Good Friday (Carner)
- 1936 La rosa als llavis – the rose to the lips (Joan Salvat-Papasseit), voice and orchestra, Albèniz prize.
- 1940 La zagala alegre – Sp. the happy girl (Pablo de Jérica); Mañanita de San Juan Sp. on the morning of the Feast of Saint John (Anon 16th century)
- 1941 Nadie puede ser dichoso – Sp. Nobody can be happy (Garcilaso de la Vega); Después que te conocí – Since I've known you (Francisco de Quevedo); Cantarcillo; Madre, unos ojuelos vi (Lope de Vega)
- 1947 Muntanya d'amor – mountain of love (Manuel Bertran i Oriola)
- 1951 As froliñas dos toxos (Antonio Noriega)
- 1958 Cançó per a fer dormir l'Eduard i Villancet – song to put Eduard i Villancet to sleep, dedicated to his family.
- 1960 Aquarel·la del Montseny – a watercolour of Montseney (Mossèn Pere Ribot), with string quartet.

=== Sardanes ===
Sardanes and music for brass.

- 1912 Sardana for flute and piano
- 1917 Sol ponent – setting sun
- 1918 Gentil Antònia – gentle Antònia
- 1919 Marinera – the sailor
- 1920 Sardana revessa no.1 Nuvolada – the clouds.
- 1921 Sardana revessa no.2 Lluna plena – full moon
- 1921 Sardana revessa no.3 Mariona; the glossa Les danses de Vilanova – The dances of Vilanova.
- 1922 L'hereu i la pubilla – The heir and heiress, La Nevada – Snow, Esperança – Hope, Caterina d'Alió; Sol ixent –
- 1923 Camperola – the farm
- 1924 La Ciseta; L'Hostal de la Peira; El bac de les ginesteres, sardana for piano; Virolet
- 1925 Ofrena – offering; La fageda d'en Jordà – the Jordan fig tree; Puig Neulós – Mt. Neulós
- 1926 El roserar – The rose garden; el poema per a tres cobles i timbales – poem for 3 brass instruments and cymbals; La maledicció del Comte Arnau – the curse of count Arnau.
- 1929 Atzavares i baladres – agaves and oleandres
- 1930 Tamariu
- 1931 Cantallops
- 1932 Coll Forcat i Salou
- 1934 Faluga
- 1935 Perafita i Capvespre – sunset at Perafita
- 1946 Vilanovina i Maria Isabel
- 1948 Mariàngela
- 1950 Vallgorguina

Many of his works are published by La Mà de Guido.

== Selected Recordings of Toldrá as conductor ==
- El retablo de maese Pedro
