= Victoria de los Ángeles =

Spanish opera singer (1923–2005)

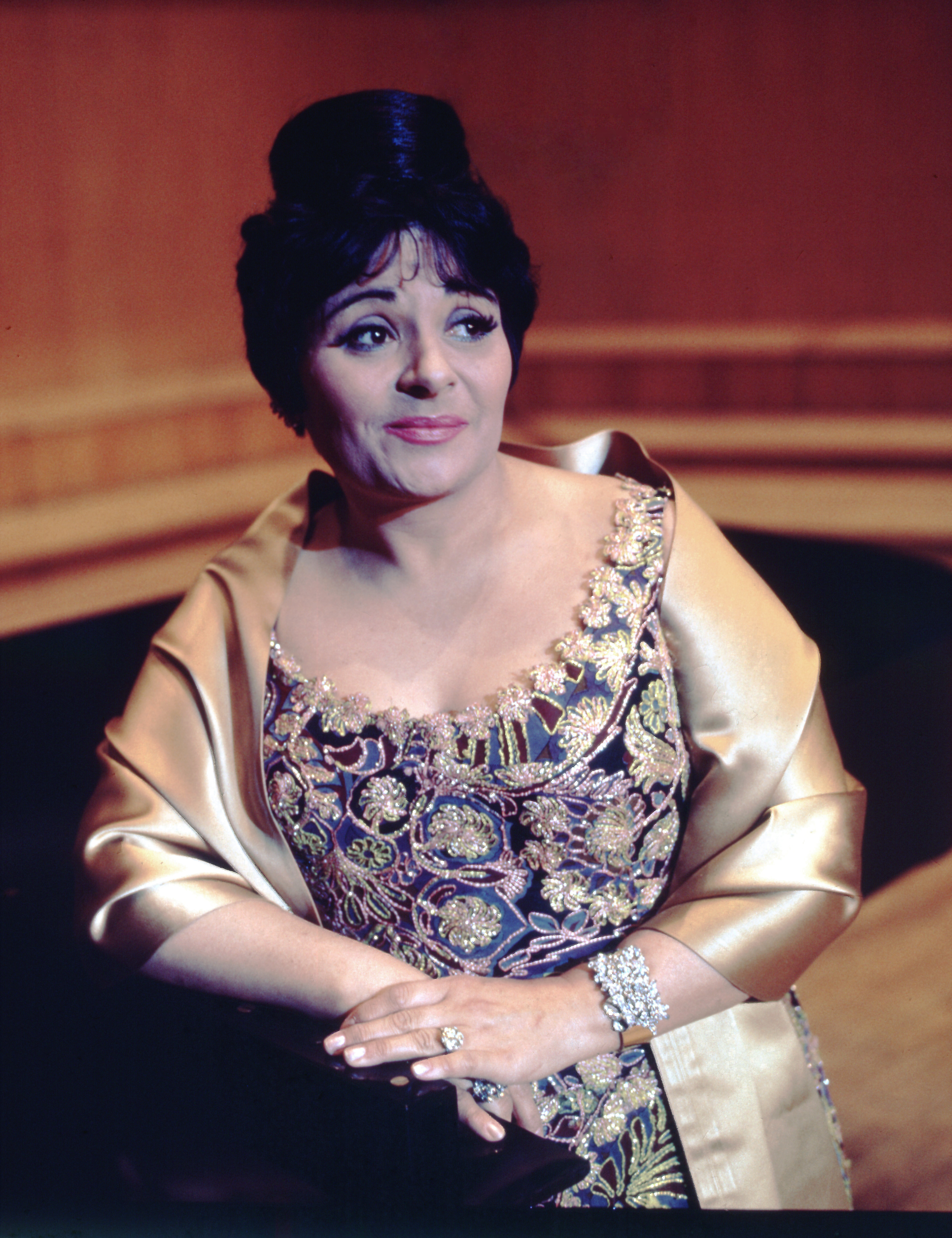
- de los Ángeles in 1975
- Born: Victoria de los Ángeles López García; 1 November 1923; Barcelona, Catalonia, Kingdom of Spain
- Died: 15 January 2005 (aged 81); Barcelona, Catalonia, Spain
- Burial place: Montjuïc Cemetery, Barcelona
- Education: Conservatorio Superior de Música del Liceo
- Occupation: Soprano
- Spouse: Enrique Magriña (m. 1948, died)
- Children: 2

Victoria de los Ángeles López García (1 November 1923 – 15 January 2005) was a Spanish operatic lyric soprano and recitalist whose career began after the Second World War and reached its height in the years from the mid-1950s to the mid-1960s.

== Early life ==
She was born Victoria de los Ángeles López García in the porter's lodge of the University of Barcelona, to Bernardo Lopez Gómez (or Gamez), a university caretaker, and Victoria García. She studied voice under Dolores Frau, and guitar with Graciano Tarragó, at the Barcelona Conservatory, graduating in 1941 after three years, at the age of 18.

== Career in music ==
In 1941, while still a student, she made her operatic debut as Mimì in La bohème at the Liceu, afterwards resuming her musical studies. In 1945, she returned to the Liceu to make her professional debut as the Countess in The Marriage of Figaro.

After winning first prize in the Geneva International Music Competition in 1947, she sang Salud in Falla's La vida breve with the BBC in London in 1948. She was accompanied on many of her early recordings by both Graciano Tarragó and his daughter, the guitarist Renata Tarragó.

In her early years in particular, she also sang a lot of florid music (music antiche). While she later made fewer appearances in opera, she continued to give recitals focusing on mostly French, German Lieder and Spanish art songs or songs with Nahuatl texts by Mexican composer Salvador Moreno Manzano into the 1990s.

In 1949, she made her first appearance in the Paris Opéra as Marguerite. The following year, she made her debut in Salzburg and at the Royal Opera House, Covent Garden as Mimì, and in the United States with a recital at Carnegie Hall. In March 1951, she made her Metropolitan Opera debut in New York as Marguérite, and she went on to sing with the company for ten years. In 1952, she became an instant favourite in Buenos Aires at the Teatro Colón as the title role in Madama Butterfly. She returned to Buenos Aires many times until 1979. She sang at La Scala in Milan from 1950 to 1956 and, in 1957, she sang at the Vienna State Opera.

After making her debut at the Bayreuth Festival as Elisabeth in Tannhäuser in 1961, she devoted herself principally to a concert career. However, for the next twenty years, she continued to make occasional appearances in one of her favourite operatic roles, Bizet's Carmen. She was among the first Spanish-born operatic singers to record the complete opera, having done so in 1958 in a recording conducted by Sir Thomas Beecham, using the recitatives added by Ernest Guiraud after Bizet's death. Though Carmen lay comfortably in her range, she nevertheless also sang major soprano roles, the best known of which were Donna Anna, Manon, Nedda, Desdemona, Cio-Cio-San, Mimi, Violetta and Mélisande.

James Hinton, Jr. praised the curious means she used to achieve her characterisation of Rosina in the 1954 Met's The Barber of Seville:

...she — almost literally – does nothing at all that is in the conventional sense 'effective'. She is rapidly becoming one of those great rarities... a personality who makes everyone believe in her characterizations. Even in that there is a flaw, for she really offers no characterization. The personality is always the same... Yet the audience believes... that this is the way whichever character she happens to be dressed as must have been..."

De los Ángeles performed regularly in song recitals with pianists Gerald Moore and Geoffrey Parsons, occasionally appearing with other eminent singers, such as Elisabeth Schwarzkopf and Dietrich Fischer-Dieskau. Her recitals of Spanish songs with the pianist Alicia de Larrocha, a fellow Barcelona native who was her close friend, were also legendary. She sang at the closing ceremony of the 1992 Summer Olympics, aged 68.

She made many widely acclaimed recordings, including those of La vida breve, La bohème, Pagliacci, and Madama Butterfly. The last three paired her with the outstanding tenor Jussi Björling. She was particularly appreciative of Björling's unique talent. In de los Ángeles' biography by Peter Roberts, de los Ángeles noted that "in despite of technical developments, none of the Jussi Björling recordings give you the true sound of his voice. It was a far, far more beautiful voice than you can hear on the recordings he left".

The government of France named her a Chevalier of the Légion d'honneur in 1994.

== Personal life and death ==
She married Enrique Magriña in 1948. He and one of their two sons predeceased her.

She was hospitalized for a bronchial infection on December 31, 2004, and died of respiratory failure on 15 January 2005, aged 81. She was buried in the Montjuïc Cemetery, Barcelona.

== Recognition ==
Her obituary in The Times (UK) noted that she must be counted "among the finest singers of the second half of the 20th century". James Hinton, Jr. praised her "meltingly lovely middle voice". Elizabeth Forbes, writing in UK's The Independent, also noted that "It is impossible to imagine a more purely beautiful voice than that of Victoria de los Ángeles at the height of her career in the 1950s and early 1960s". She was ranked number 3, after Maria Callas and Joan Sutherland, in the BBC Music Magazine's List of The Top Twenty Sopranos of All Time (2007).

The municipal music school of Sant Cugat del Vallès is named for her (Escola Municipal de Música Victòria dels Àngels) and is located on a plaza bearing her name (Plaça Victòria dels Àngels). This school preserves her first grand piano, a Steck no. 49253 from 1913, purchased in Barcelona in 1948. Several other municipalities in Catalonia and many other in all of Spain have streets named after her.

In 2007 a private foundation was established in order to preserve her legacy, named Fundació Victoria de los Ángeles.

== Partial discography ==
- 1952: "Il Barbiere di Siviglia": Tullio Serafin (cond.) Orchestra Sinfonica di Milano; Gino Bechi (Figaro); Nicola Monti (Il Conte Almaviva). EMI
- 1953: "Pagliacci": Renato Cellini (cond.) RCA Victor Orchestra; Jussi Björling (Canio); Leonard Warren (Tonio); Robert Merrill (Silvio). RCA Victor
- 1953: "Pergolesi: Stabat Mater": Arturo Toscanini (cond.) NBC Symphony Orchestra; Oralia Domínguez. RCA Victor
- 1953: "La Vida Breve" (complete): Manuel de Falla, EMI, HMV ALP1150-1151/RCA Victor Red Seal, LM-6017, 1953, with Emilio Payá (baritone), Rosario Gomez (mezzo-soprano), Pablo Civil (tenor). Ernesto Halffter, conductor, with the Orquestra Simfònica de l'Òpera de Barcelona
- 1953: "Faust": André Cluytens (cond.) L'Opéra de Paris orchestra; Nicolai Gedda (Faust); Boris Christoff (Mephistopheles). EMI.
- 1954: "Madama Butterfly": Gianandrea Gavazzeni (cond.) Teatro dell'Opera de Roma Orchestra: Tito Gobbi (Sharpless); Giuseppe di Stefano (Pinkerton). EMI Records.
- 1955: "Les nuits d'été": Hector Berlioz, Charles Munch (cond.), Boston Symphony Orchestra. RCA Victor/EMI.
- 1955: "Manon": Pierre Monteux (cond.) Chorus and Orchestra of the Théâtre-National de l'Opéra-Comique. EMI.
- 1956: "La bohème": Thomas Beecham (cond.) RCA Victor Orchestra; Jussi Bjorling (Rodolfo); Robert Merrill (Marcello); Giorgio Tozzi (Colline); Lucine Amara (Musetta). RCA Victor/EMI.
- 1957: "Simon Boccanegra": Gabriele Santini (cond.), Teatro dell’Opera di Roma; Tito Gobbi (Boccanegra); Victoria de los Ángeles (Amelia/Maria); Giuseppe Campora (Adorno); Boris Christoff (Fiesco). EMI/Warner Classics (remastered 1990)
- 1958: "Faust": André Cluytens (cond.) L'Opéra de Paris orchestra; Nicolai Gedda (Faust); Boris Christoff (Mephistopheles). EMI.
- 1959: "Carmen": Thomas Beecham (cond.) Orchestre philharmonique de Radio France; Nicolai Gedda (Don José); Janine Micheau (Micaëla); Ernest Blanc (Escamillo). EMI.
- 1959: "La traviata": Tullio Serafin (cond.) Teatro dell'Opera de Roma Orchestra: Carlo del Monte (Alfredo); Mario Sereni (Germont). EMI.
- 1959: "Madama Butterfly": Gabriele Santini (cond.) Teatro dell'Opera de Roma Orchestra: Jussi Björling (Pinkerton); Mario Sereni (Sharpless). EMI
- 1962: "Cavalleria rusticana": Gabriele Santini (cond.) Teatro dell'Opera de Roma Orchestra: Franco Corelli (Turiddu); Mario Sereni (Alfio). EMI
- 1962: "Il Barbiere di Siviglia": Vittorio Gui (cond.) Royal Philharmonic Orchestra: Sesto Bruscantini (Figaro); Luigi Alva (Il Conte Almaviva). EMI
- 1962: "Requiem" (Fauré): André Cluytens (cond.) Paris Conservatoire Orchestra: Dietrich Fischer-Dieskau. EMI.
- 1964: "Les Contes d'Hoffmann": André Cluytens (cond.) Paris Conservatoire Orchestra: Nicolai Gedda (Hoffmann), Jean-Christophe Benoît (Nicklausse), Elisabeth Schwarzkopf (Giulietta), Gianna d'Angelo (Olimpia), Jacques Loreau (Andres\Cochenille\Frantz\Pittichinaccio). EMI.
- 1965: "La Vida Breve" (complete): Manuel de Falla, EMI CD M 7 69590 2, Rafael Frühbeck de Burgos (cond.) Orquesta Nacional de España, Orfeón Donostiarra; Inés Rivadeneira (la abuela); Carlo Cossutta (Paco); Ana Maria Higueras (Carmela).
- 1965: "Dido and Aeneas": John Barbirolli (cond.) English Chamber Orchestra; Peter Glossop (Aeneas); Heather Harper (Belinda). EMI
- 1966: "L'enfance du Christ": André Cluytens (cond.) Paris Conservatoire Orchestra; Nicolai Gedda; Ernest Blanc; Roger Soyer; Xavier Depraz. EMI
- 1968-69: "Werther": Georges Prêtre (cond.) Orchestre de Paris; Nicolai Gedda (Werther); Mady Mesplé (Sophie). EMI
- 1977: "Orlando Furioso": Claudio Scimone (cond.) I Solisti Veneti; Marilyn Horne (Orlando); Lucia Valentini-Terrani (Alcina). Erato
- 1990: "Chants d'Auvergne": Joseph Canteloube, EMI Studio DRM CD M 7 63176 2, Jean-Pierre Jacquillat (cond.) Orchestre des Concerts Lamoureux
- 1992: "Traditional Catalan Songs", with Geoffrey Parsons (pianist). Collins Classics
- 1993: "The Fabulous Victoria de los Angeles" (4 CD boxed set, with recordings from 1960 through 1993), EMI.
- 2008: "Victoria de los Angeles: The Voice of an Angel" (Overview of career on 7 CDS / 165 tracks on mp3) EMI.
