= Eva Canel =

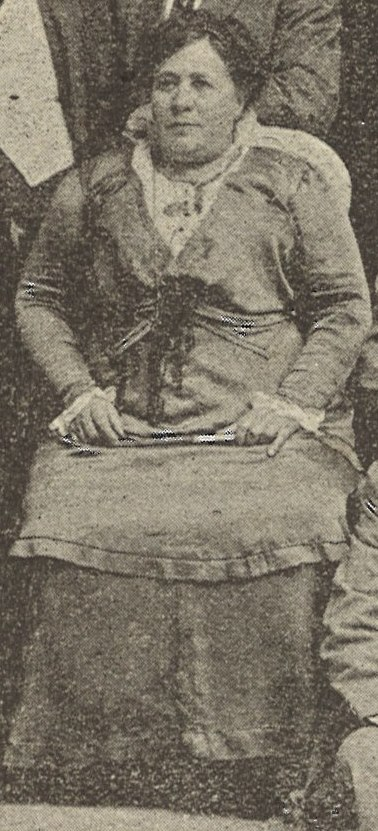
- Born: January 30, 1857; Coaña, Asturias, Spain
- Died: May 2, 1932 (aged 75); Havana, Cuba
- Occupations: actress, writer and journalist
- Relatives: Luisa Lacal de Bracho (great niece)

Agar Eva Infanzón Canel (January 30, 1857 – May 2, 1932), best known by her pseudonym Eva Canel, was an actress, writer and journalist, originally from Spain who settled in Cuba.

== Biography ==
Eva Canel was born on January 30, 1857, in Coaña, Asturias, Spain, the daughter of Doctor Pedro Infanzón and Epifanía Canel y Uría.

When she was three, her father died in a shipwreck caused by pirates and she moved to Madrid with her mother. When she was fifteen, she began to work as an actress in the theater; there she met Eloy Perillan y Buxo, the director of the satirical magazine La Broma, whom she married that same year.

In 1874, censors exiled her husband for publishing a pamphlet and he left for Bolivia, leaving her as director of the magazine. A year later, Canel traveled to South America to reunite with her husband and collaborate on El Ferrocarril, the magazine that he directed in La Paz. In January 1875, the couple moved to Buenos Aires and founded El Petróleo, where she began to dedicate herself to journalism full-time. In 1876, they decided to move again, this time to Lima, Peru, where they founded Las Noticias and collaborated with various newspapers such as El Comercio and El Perú Ilustrado. It was then that the couple's only child was born, whom they baptized with the same name as his father.

Due to the War of the Pacific between Peru and Chile, Canel and her family returned to Spain once again, settling in Barcelona. Nonetheless, Perillán ended up moving to Cuba, where he died on March 1, 1889, and Canel moved to the island a short time later. There, she tried to find work in two Cuban newspapers, Diario de la Marina and Unión Constitucional, but their respective directors refused to hire her. Because of this, in 1891 she founded her own weekly, named La Cotorra, which was characterized by political satire. After spending eight years in Cuba and the Cuban war of Independence ended, Eva returned to Spain, moving back to Madrid. Nonetheless, in 1899, she returned to Buenos Aires, where she began her literary peak, writing three novels, giving a number of conferences and collaborating with various newspapers. Additionally, she became the owner of a printing press and founded the magazines Kosmos, in 1904 and Vida Española, in 1907.

On July 15, 1905, she gave a lecture at the gala in the Teatro Español, during the festivities for the inauguration of the Hospital of Charity. Jaime Serralta presented the prestigious writer who spoke on "Charity" and was given a standing ovation.

In 1914, Canel began a trip through Latin America, but fell ill upon arriving in Panama, and although she initially decided to go to a clinic in the United States, she ended up returning to Cuba, where she received assistance from her friend Antonio Díaz Blanco. There she continued her journalism and literary work until 1924 when her health deteriorated and she began to have nervous breakdowns and memory loss.

She died in Havana on May 2, 1932. She was buried in her hometown.

== Works ==
Eva Canel's work has a variety of influences and uses a range of techniques, from Romanticism to Naturalism. Occasionally, she denied authorship of her work, attributing it instead to her husband, Eloy Perillán Buxó.

=== Novels ===
- Manolín (1891)
- Trapitos al sol (1891)
- Oremus (1893)
- El agua turbia (1906)

=== Theater ===
- La mulata (1891)
- El indiano (1894)
- Fuera de la ley (1902)
- Agua de limón (1904)
- La abuelita (1905)
- De Herodes a Pilatos (1905)
- Uno de Baler (1907)

=== Other genres ===
- Cosas del otro mundo. Viajes, historias y cuentos americanos (1889)
- Magosto. Colección de tradiciones, novelas y conferencias asturianas (1894)
- Álbum de la Trocha. Breve reseña de una excursión feliz desde Cienfuegos a San Fernando, recorriendo la línea militar (1897)
- De América. Viajes, tradiciones y novelitas cortas (1899)
- Lo que vi en Cuba. A través de la isla (1916)
