= Montserrat Figueras =

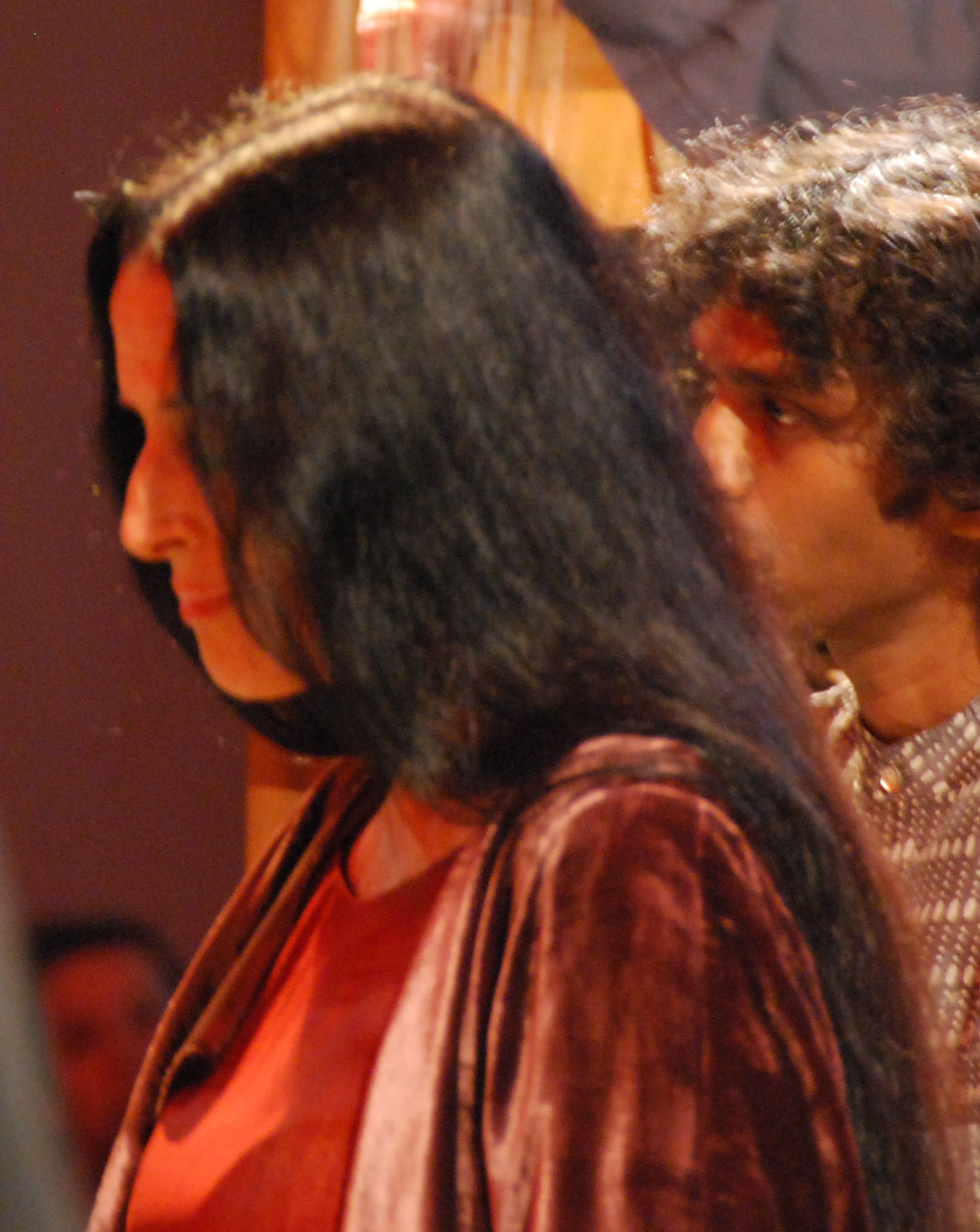
- Montserrat Figueras in 2010

Background information
- Born: Montserrat Figueras i García; 15 March 1942; Barcelona, Spain
- Origin: Catalan
- Died: 23 November 2011 (aged 69) Cerdanyola del Vallès, Spain
- Genres: Early music
- Instrument: Vocals

Montserrat Figueras i García (Catalan: [munsəˈrat fiˈɣeɾəs i ɣəɾˈsi.ə], 15 March 1942 – 23 November 2011) was a Catalan soprano who specialized in early music.

Figueras was born 15 March 1942 in Barcelona, Spain. After initially training as an actress she began studying early singing techniques in 1966, together with her sister Pilar Figueras, and developed an approach and technique for singing early music which combined historical fidelity with vitality.

In 1974 she and Jordi Savall, her husband since 1968, Lorenzo Alpert and Hopkinson Smith formed Hespèrion XX (Later: Hespèrion XXI), an early music ensemble. Figueras and her husband also founded the groups La Capella Reial de Catalunya and Le Concert des Nations.

Figueras performed and recorded regularly as a solo artist and she and her husband also performed with their children: daughter Arianna and son Ferran.

She died on 23 November 2011 in Cerdanyola del Vallès, surrounded by her family, after a long battle with cancer. The funeral was held at the Monastery of Pedralbes in Barcelona.
