= Conservatori Superior de Música del Liceu =

Music college in Barcelona, Spain

Coordinates: 41°23′19″N 2°10′23″E

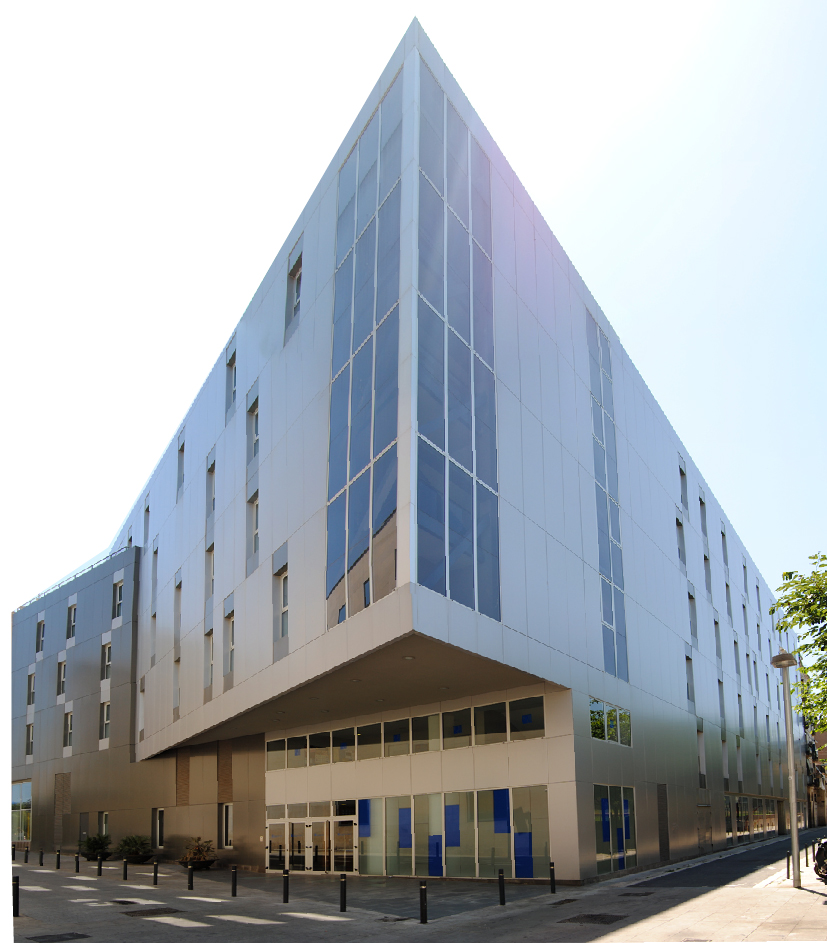
The conservatory's new building, constructed in 2009

Conservatori Superior de Música del Liceu (Catalan pronunciation: [kunsəɾβəˈtɔɾi supəɾiˈo ðə ˈmuzikə ðəl liˈsɛw]) is a music college in Barcelona, Catalonia, Spain. It was created in 1837 with the name Liceo Filo-dramático de Montesión.

In 1847 the institution inaugurated the opera house Gran Teatre del Liceu. In 1854, the Liceo Filarmónico and the Gran Teatre del Liceu separated administratively. Nevertheless, both entities have always remained closely linked.

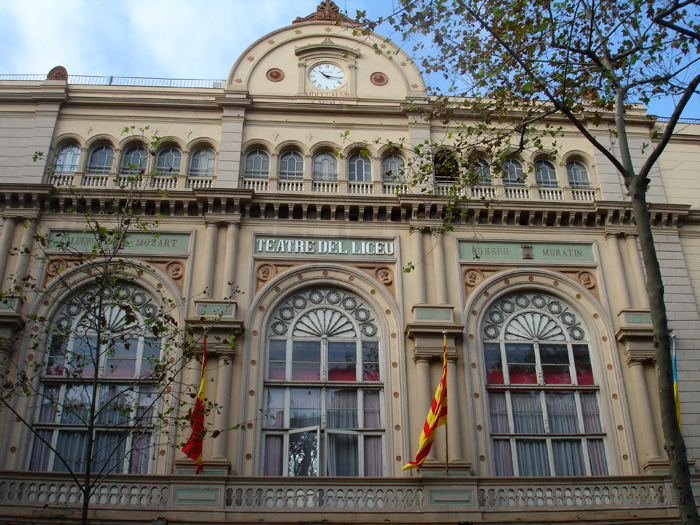
Facade of the Gran Teatre del Liceu

Among its students have been, among other, artists as: singers Francisco Viñas, Maria Barrientos, Josefina Huguet, Conchita Supervía, Mercedes Capsir, Elvira de Hidalgo, Miguel Fleta, Victoria de los Ángeles, Jaume Aragall, Montserrat Caballé, Manuel Ausensi, José Carreras, Eduard Giménez, Dalmacio González, Juan Pons, Nuria Rial, Josep Bros; guitarist Renata Tarragó; pianists Frank Marshall, Luisa Lacal de Bracho; or composers Leonardo Balada, Lluís Benejam, Agusti Grau Joan Guinjoan, Joan Lamote de Grignon, Ricard Lamote de Grignon, Frederic Mompou, Carles Santos, Manuel Valls, and Joaquim Zamacois. Many of them also became professors there upon completion of their studies, including Renata Tarragó. Among the professors there were Catalan composers Enric Morera, Graciano Tarragó and German composer Engelbert Humperdinck. The Barcelona Guitar Orchestra is based there.

Since 1999 Maria Serrat i Martín has assumed the General Direction and in 2002 the Spanish composer and musicologist Benet Casablancas assumed the academic direction of the Conservatori Superior de Música del Liceu.
