= Pipe (instrument) =

Simple wooden flute

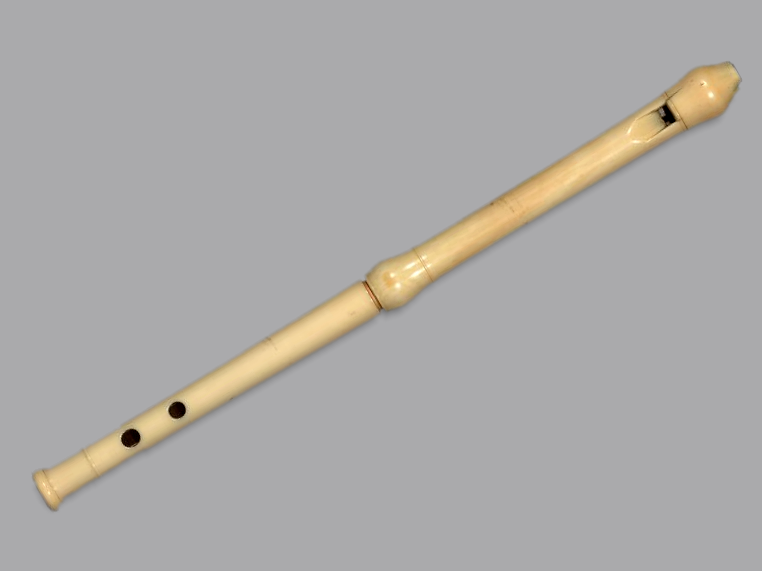
- Classification: Wind; Woodwind

Playing range
- 1-2 octaves

Related instruments
- Tinwhistle; Recorder; Galoubet

A pipe is a tubular wind instrument in general, or various specific wind instruments. The word is an onomatopoeia, and comes from the tone which can resemble that of a bird chirping.

With just three holes, a pipe's range is obtained by overblowing to sound at least the second or the third harmonic partials.

== Folk pipe ==
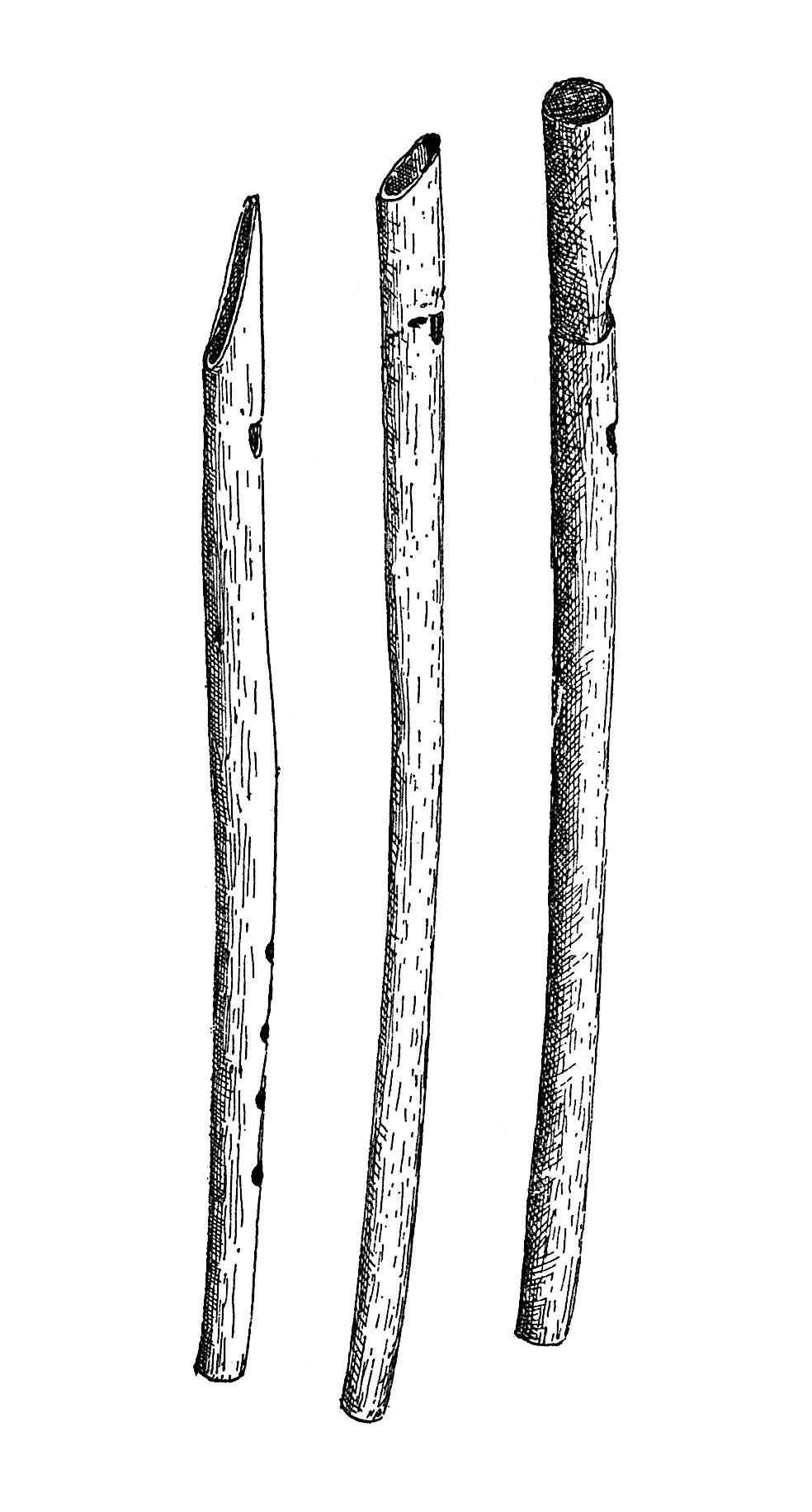
Examples of Polish folk pipe made of willow bark (fujarka), which may be up to 40 cm long

Fipple flutes are found in many cultures around the world. Often with six holes, the shepherd's pipe is a common pastoral image. Shepherds often piped both to soothe the sheep and to amuse themselves. Modern manufactured six-hole folk pipes are referred to as pennywhistle or tin whistle. The recorder is a form of pipe, often used as a rudimentary instructional musical instrument at schools, but versatile enough that it is also used in orchestral music.

== Tabor pipe ==
The three-holed pipe is a form of the folk pipe which is usually played with one hand, while the other hand plays a tabor or other drone instrument such as a bell or a psalterium (string-drum).

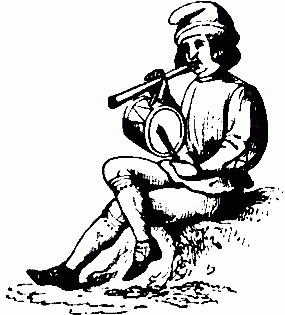
A minstrel playing tabor and pipe

In English this instrument is properly called simply a pipe, but is often referred to as a tabor pipe to distinguish it from other instruments. The tabor pipe has two finger holes and one thumb hole. In the English tradition, these three holes play the same notes as the bottom three holes of a tin whistle, or tone, tone, semitone. Other tabor pipes, such as the French galoubet, the Picco pipe, the Basque txistu and xirula, the Aragonese chiflo or the Andalusian gaita of Huelva and gaita rociera, are tuned differently.

A much larger (typically 150 to 170 cm long), sophisticated 3-hole pipe played is the Slovak fujara, made of two connected parallel pipes of different lengths. This is not to be mistaken with the Polish single pipe (fujara, fujarka), which is a much smaller (up to 40 cm) old-fashioned instrument usually made of willow bark. The latter also exists in locally modified modern versions (also played, for example, in Toronto at "The Pride of Poland", a 2005 concert featuring symphonic and Polish folk music).

Similar to both the Slovak and Polish instruments is the Czech fujara.

The pipe and tabor was a common combination throughout Asia in the medieval period, and remains popular in some parts of Europe and the Americas today. The English pipe and tabor had waned in popularity, but had not died out before a revival by Morris dance musicians in the early 20th century.

Traditionally made of cane, bone, ivory, or wood, today pipes are also available made of metal and of plastic.

== Flageolet ==
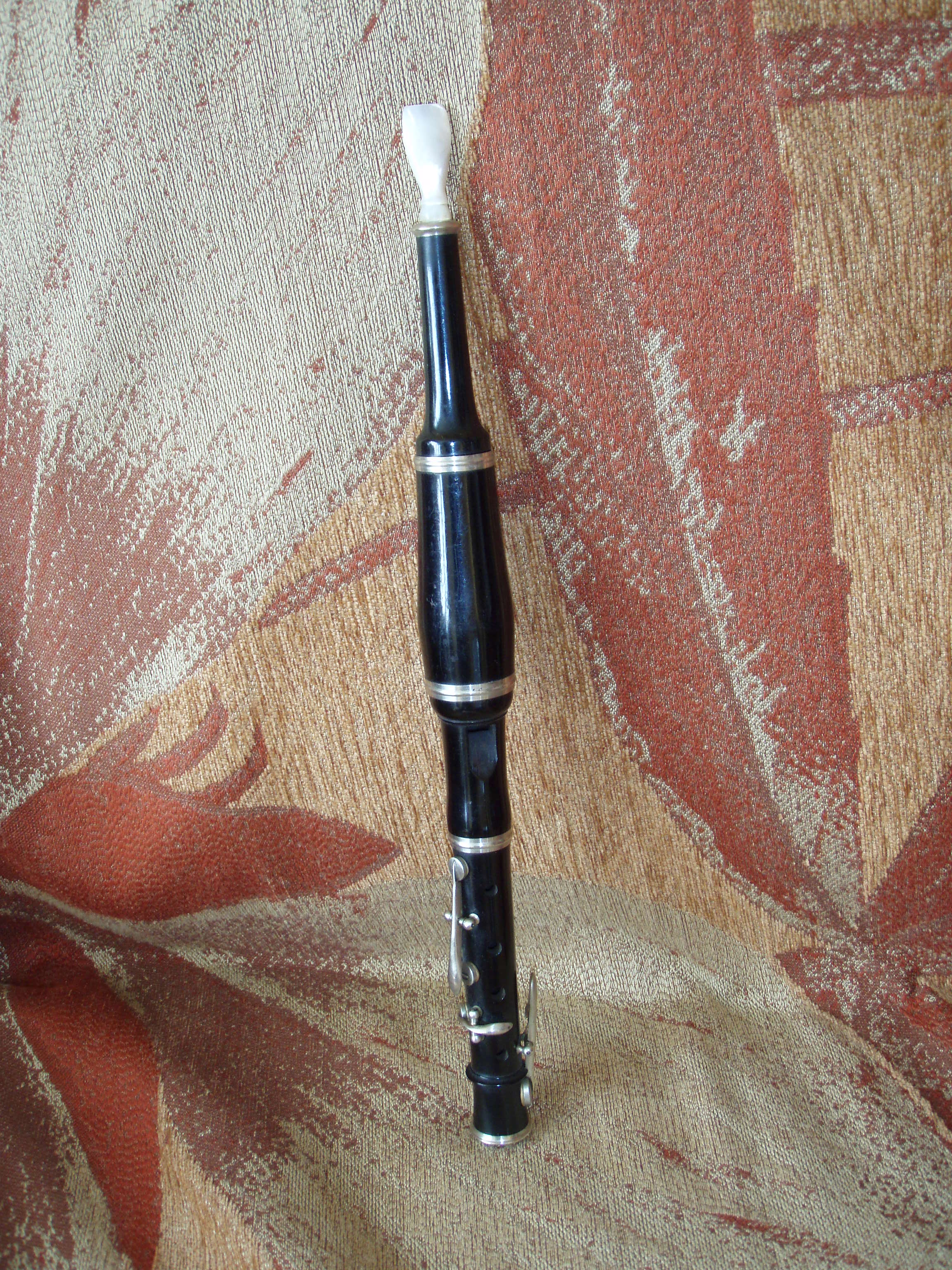
A 19th-century flageolet

The flageolet was developed from the tabor pipe, in France, and became an orchestral instrument. Its lower three holes were configured the same as a tabor pipe, with two on front and one on back. A second set of three holes was added above this. The mouthpiece had a unique configuration with a sponge inside.

Used as orchestral instruments into the 19th century, the flageolet was given keys, like in the orchestral flute.

== Diaulos ==
A diaulos was an ancient Greek wind instrument composed of two pipes (aulos), which were played similar to an oboe. The two pipes were connected at their base and often of different lengths. Circular breathing was sometimes used by the performer.

== Reed pipe ==
A reed pipe is an instrument which is similar in construction to the fipple flutes but instead of a whistle mouthpiece, has a single reed (like a clarinet or bagpipe chanter) or a double reed, like the oboe. Examples of single-reed reedpipes include diplica, launeddas, sipsi, hornpipe, pibgorn, alboka and triple pipes. Examples of double-reed reedpipes include shawm, oboe, bassoon, duduk and piri.

== Hornpipe ==
Hornpipes are instruments with one or more pipes that have single reeds that terminate in a resonator made of horn. Simple instruments may consist of little more than the reed, the pipe, and the resonator. More complex instruments may have multiple pipes held in a common yoke, multiple resonators, or horn mouthpieces to facilitate playing. They are known from a broad region extending from India in the east to Spain in the west that includes north Africa and most of Europe.

== See also ==
- Bagpipes
- Flute
- Organ
- Panpipes
- Zuffolo
- Pipe and tabor
- Pipers' Guild
