= Three-hole pipe =

Wind instrument

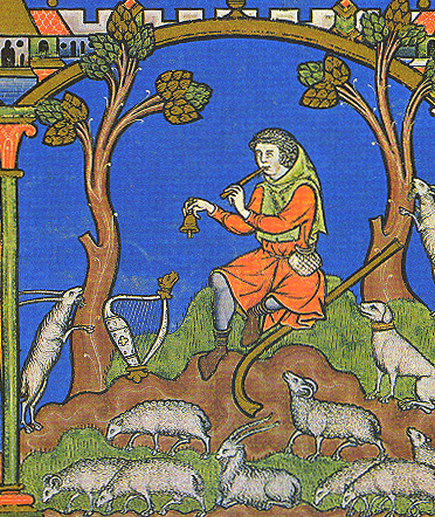
- Other names: Galoubet, Schwegel, Schwiegel, Swegel, Tamerlinpfeife, Tämmerinpfeife
- Classification: Wind; Woodwind

Playing range
- 1–2 octaves

Related instruments
- Tin whistle; Recorder

The three-hole pipe, also commonly known as tabor pipe or galoubet, is a wind instrument designed to be played by one hand, leaving the other hand free to play a tabor drum, bell, psalterium or tambourin à cordes, bones, triangle or other percussive instrument.

The three-hole pipe's origins are not known, but it dates back at least to the 12th century.

It was popular from an early date in France, the Iberian Peninsula and Great Britain and remains in use there today. In the Basque Country it has increasingly gained momentum and prestige during the last century, especially during the last years of the Francoist State, following that it turned into a hallmark of Basque identity and folk culture. New pipe and tabor schools have cropped up since throughout the country, providing along with tabor the musical background for traditional Basque dance ensembles (see txistu). In Andalusia these pipes (flauta or gaita and the tambor or tamboril) are played in celebrations, Cruces de Mayo, sword dances and romerías; in the music used around Romería of El Rocío (Huelva, Andalucía) this same pipe is denominated flauta rociera, gaita rociera or sometimes pito rociero (a higher pitched whistle).

The most common form of tabor pipe in the Basque region is tuned "tone, semitone, tone", as in the pipe of Andalusia. The most common form in Provence is tuned "tone, tone, tone". The English tabor pipe is commonly tuned "tone, tone, semitone", and corresponds to the three lowest holes of a tin whistle.

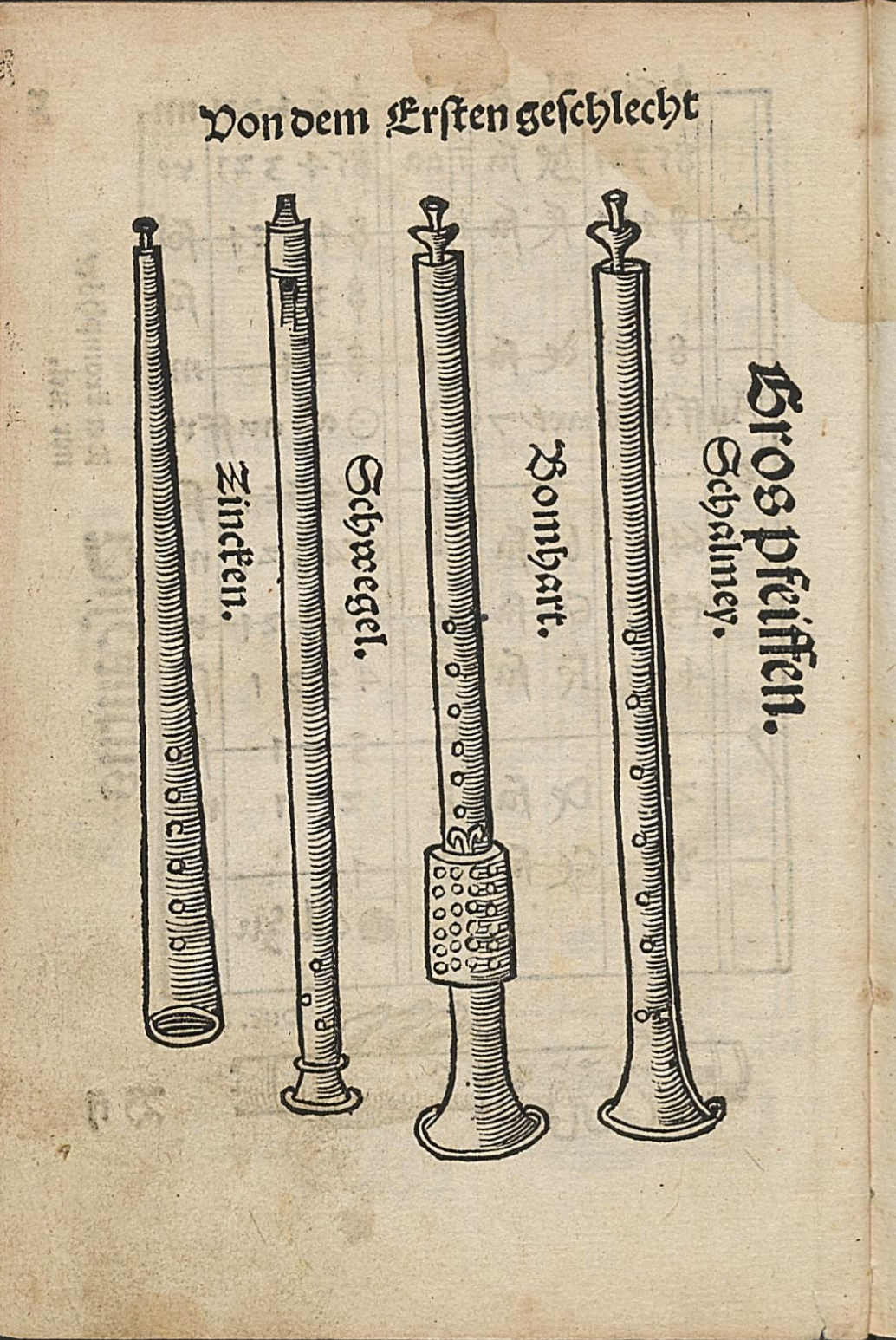
Instruments from Martin Agricola's book "Musica instrumentalis deudsch", published 1529. From left: straight cornett, three-hole pipe, bombard, shawm. The three-hole pipe illustrated isn't a reedpipe but has a duct (making it a type of recorder.

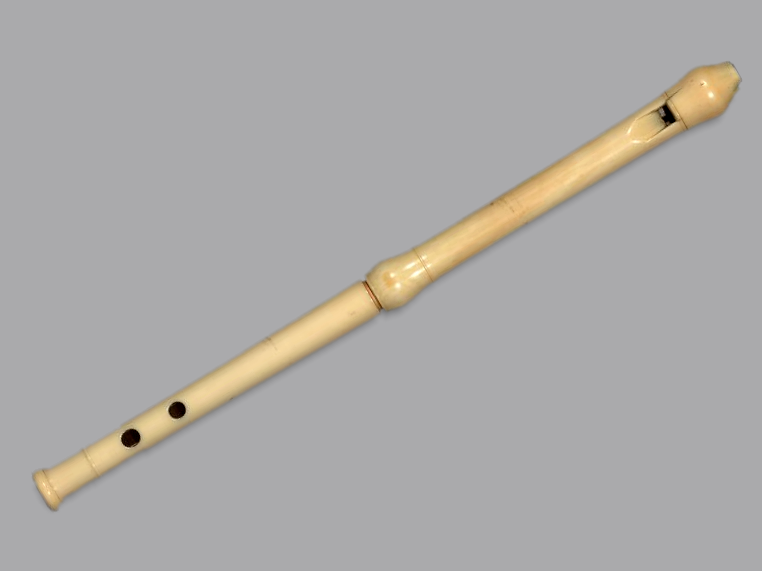
Modern three-hole pipe from England. Has two holes in front and a thumb hole.

== See also ==
- Fipple
- Flabiol
- Flageolet
- Fujara
- Pipe (instrument), or galoubet
- Jacques de Vaucanson
- Morris dance
- Picco pipe
- Pipe and tabor
- Txistu
- Zuffolo
