= Overtone flute =

Type of flute

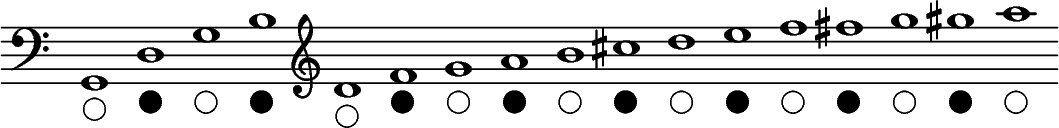
Approximation of the notes available on a koncovka made in the key of G. Notes played with the end closed are marked with "●", and notes played with the end open are marked with "○". Both groups of notes are harmonics of a fundamental on G.

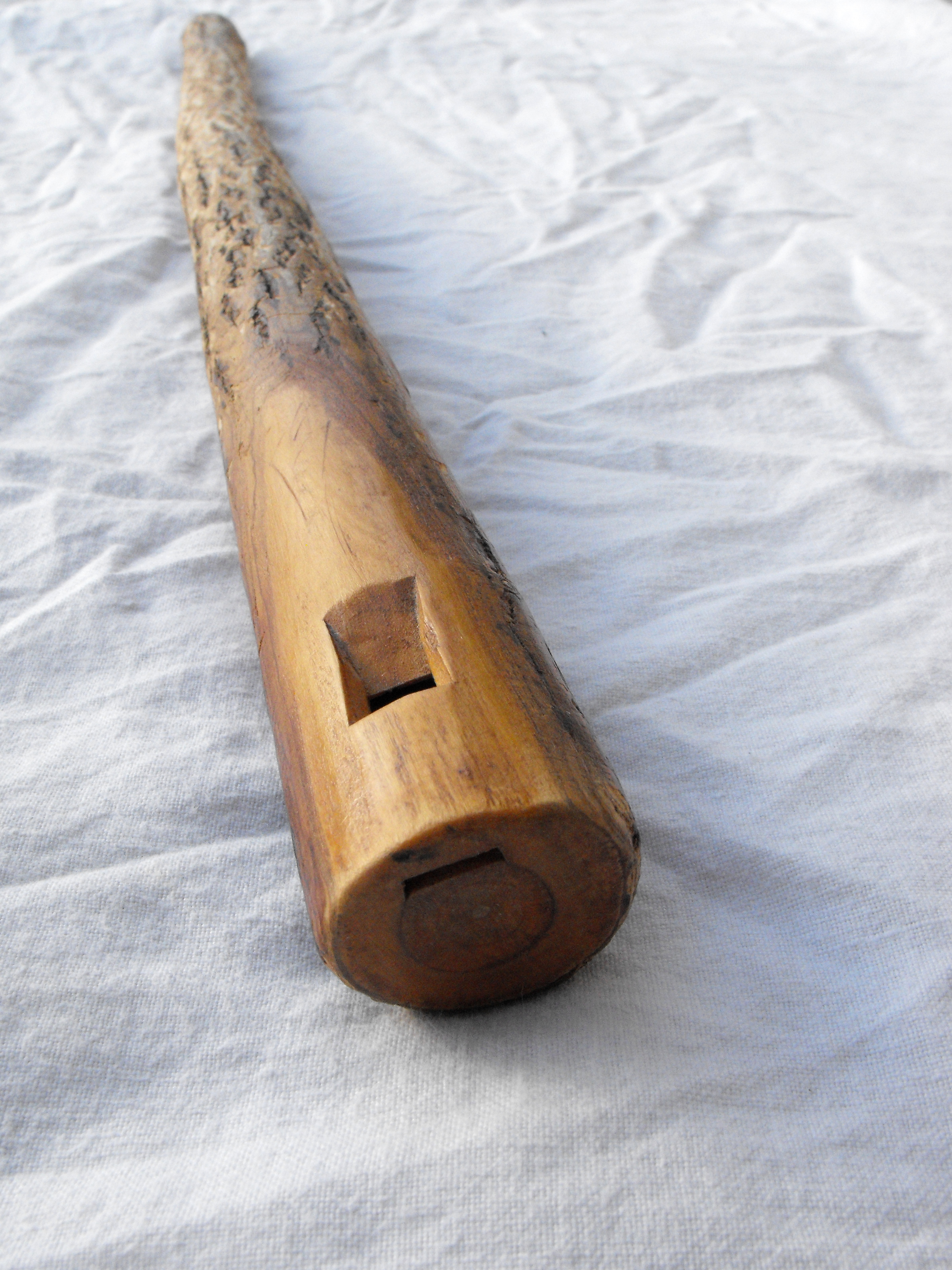
Koncovka.

Koncovka, a Slovak overtone flute

An overtone flute is a type of a flute that is designed to play in the upper harmonics, typically well above the two or three harmonics that are the practical limit for most woodwind instruments.

An overtone flute has either no tone holes, or relatively few tone holes for a woodwind instrument. To make melodies, one plays it high into the overtone series. One series of harmonics is achieved by overblowing with the end of the tube open and another is achieved with the end closed; when the end of the flute is closed, the key drops by one octave and only the uneven harmonics can pop out. This means that overtone flutes without tone holes will produce mostly the notes present in the natural scale, whilst certain notes can be bent a bit by partially covering the end of the flute.

Overtone flute tubes typically have a relatively long resonating chamber compared to their inner diameter or cross sectional area, which encourages the instrument to resonate in the higher harmonics. An overtone flute in the key of G, with an inner diameter of 1", will require more effort to play higher harmonics than an overtone flute in the same key, with an inner diameter of 1/2". For example, a ratio of 1 : 30 - Inner Diameter : Length allows for very high harmonics to be played with little effort.

== Examples ==
- Kalyuka — Russian and Ukrainian overtone flute. Traditionally, the Kalyuka was constructed from a hollow plant stem. Because of the fragile nature of the stem, the instrument was played seasonally.
- Tylynka/ Tilinkó /Tilinca - Ukrainian/Hutsul, Hungarian, and Romanian overtone flute.
- Telenka — The telenka (Ukrainian: Теленка), along with the sopilka (Ukrainian: Cопiлка), is a prominent instrument in Kalush Orchestra's 2022 song "Stefania", which won the Eurovision Song Contest for Ukraine.
- Willow flute - Scandinavian flute
- Fujara — a Slovak flute. Also known as the "Shepherd's Flute", the Fujara was developed over many years by shepherds in Slovakia and Poland. The Fujara incorporates what we now know as the major scale. There are three playing holes, the full scale is played by overblowing from the 4th of the scale (all holes open - 1st harmonic), to the 5th (all holes closed - 2nd harmonic).
- Koncovka — Slovak overtone flute with a fipple. The Koncovka is very similar to the Kalyuka.
- Choctaw overtone flute

== See also ==
- Natural trumpet, brass overtone instrument
