= Telenka =

Eastern-European folk flute

- Classification: Aerophone
- Hornbostel–Sachs classification: 421.111-1

Playing range
- c^{3}-g^{5}

Related instruments
- Telynka; Tilinca; Tylynka; Dentsivka

The telenka (Ukrainian: Теленка) (telynka, tylynka) is an overtone flute, a primitive form of dentsivka without fingerholes.

The pitch produced from the instrument is changed by placing a finger into the open end of the pipe, and covering this opening by a half or third etc. and also by the strength of the player's breath.

It is made from linden, elder, sycamore or willow. Its length is approximately 35 to 40 cm (14 to 16 in), although instruments can range up to 60 cm (24 in) in length.

This instrument is very common in Romania especially in the areas bordering with the Ukrainian Bukovina area where it is known as the tilinca. A Romanian tilinca without top is often confused with the Hungarian tilinko with top, which is easier to play for beginners (in a way, a Romanian kaval without fingerholes).

The telenka, along with the sopilka, is a prominent instrument in Kalush Orchestra's 2022 song "Stefania", which won the Eurovision Song Contest for Ukraine.

== See also ==
- Kalyuka
- Koncovka
- Ukrainian folk music

== Sources ==
- Humeniuk, A. - Ukrainski narodni muzychni instrumenty - Kyiv: "Naukova dumka", 1967
- Mizynec, V. - Ukrainian Folk Instruments - Melbourne: Bayda books, 1984
- Cherkaskyi, L. - Ukrainski narodni muzychni instrumenty // Kyiv: "Tekhnika", 2003 - 262 pages. ISBN 966-575-111-5
