= Flautino =

Flautino may refer to several high-pitched woodwind instruments:

- Zuffolo
- Sopranino recorder
- Piccolo
