= Pipe and tabor =

Pair of instruments

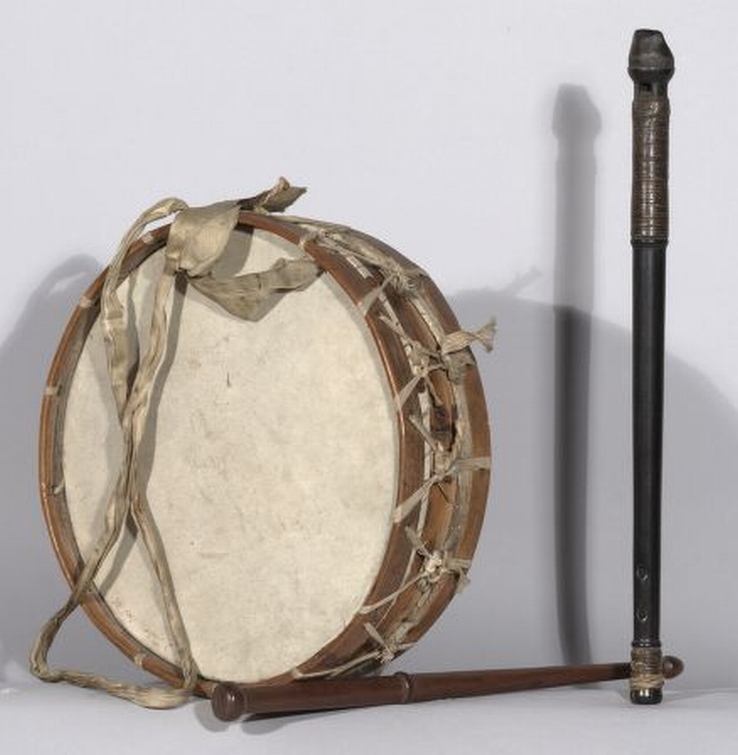
- Classification: Wind; Woodwind; Percussion

Playing range
- 1-2 octaves

Related instruments
- Tinwhistle; Snare drum; Fife and drum

Pipe and tabor is a pair of instruments played by a single player, consisting of a three-hole pipe played with one hand, and a small drum played with the other. The tabor hangs on the performer's left arm or around the neck, leaving the hands free to beat the drum with a stick in the right hand and play the pipe with thumb and first two fingers of the left hand.

The pipe is made out of wood, metal or plastic and consists of a cylindrical tube of narrow bore (1:40 diameter:length ratio) pierced with three holes near one end, two in front and one in back. At the opposite end is a fipple or block, similar to that used in a recorder.

Tabor pipes are widespread throughout the globe, found on most continents and in many countries. Each culture has developed a different style of pipe, so a different method of playing and a different range of notes. The smallest of the family is the Picco pipe, while the largest is the fujara.

In Europe there are many variations of instrument. The pipe and tabor is depicted in illuminated manuscripts, carvings on ecclesiastical buildings in stone and wood, stained glass windows and early printed books.

== Early descriptions ==
Although there had been flutes in Europe in prehistoric times, in more recent millennia the flute was absent from Europe until its arrival from Asia, by way of "North Africa, Hungary, and Bohemia." It began to be seen in illustration in the 11th century. The pipe and tabor combination is illustrated in a plate in the 13th century work, Cantigas de Santa Maria. In the 17th century, Mersenne mentions a virtuoso, John Price, who could rise to the twenty-second on the galoubet. Praetorius, author of the 1618 book De Organographia, mentions and illustrates three sizes of the Stamentienpfeiff, the treble 20 in. long, the tenor 26 in. and the bass 30, the last being played by means of a crook about 23 in. long. A specimen of the bass in the museum of the Brussels Conservatory has middle C for its lowest note.

Early descriptions

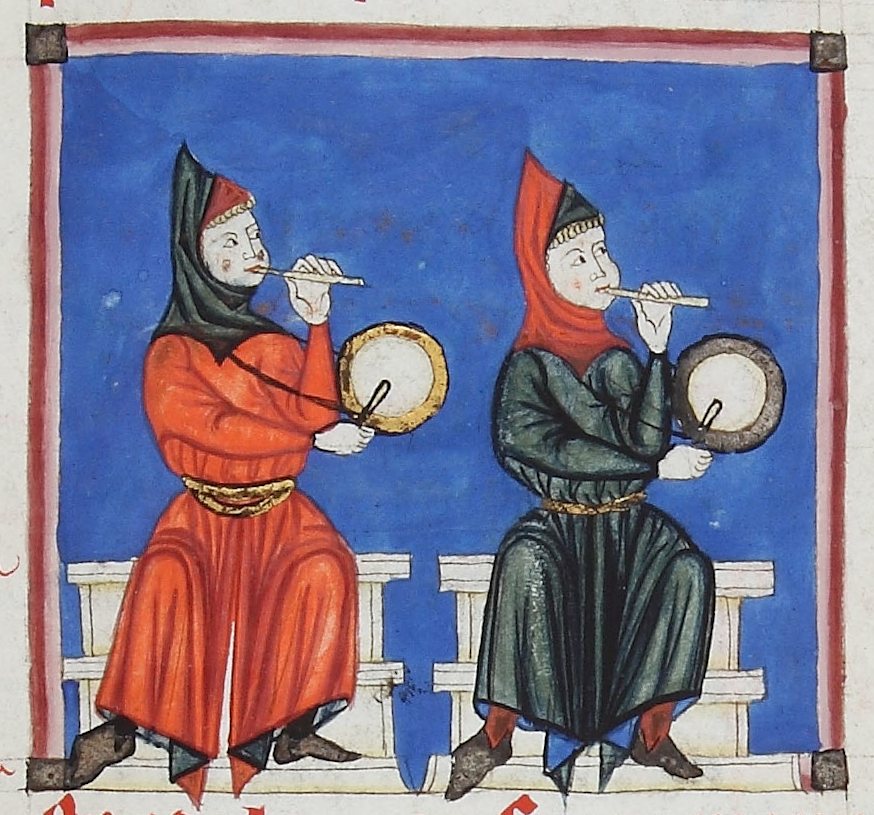
13th century, Crown of Castile. Plate from the Cantigas de Santa Maria.

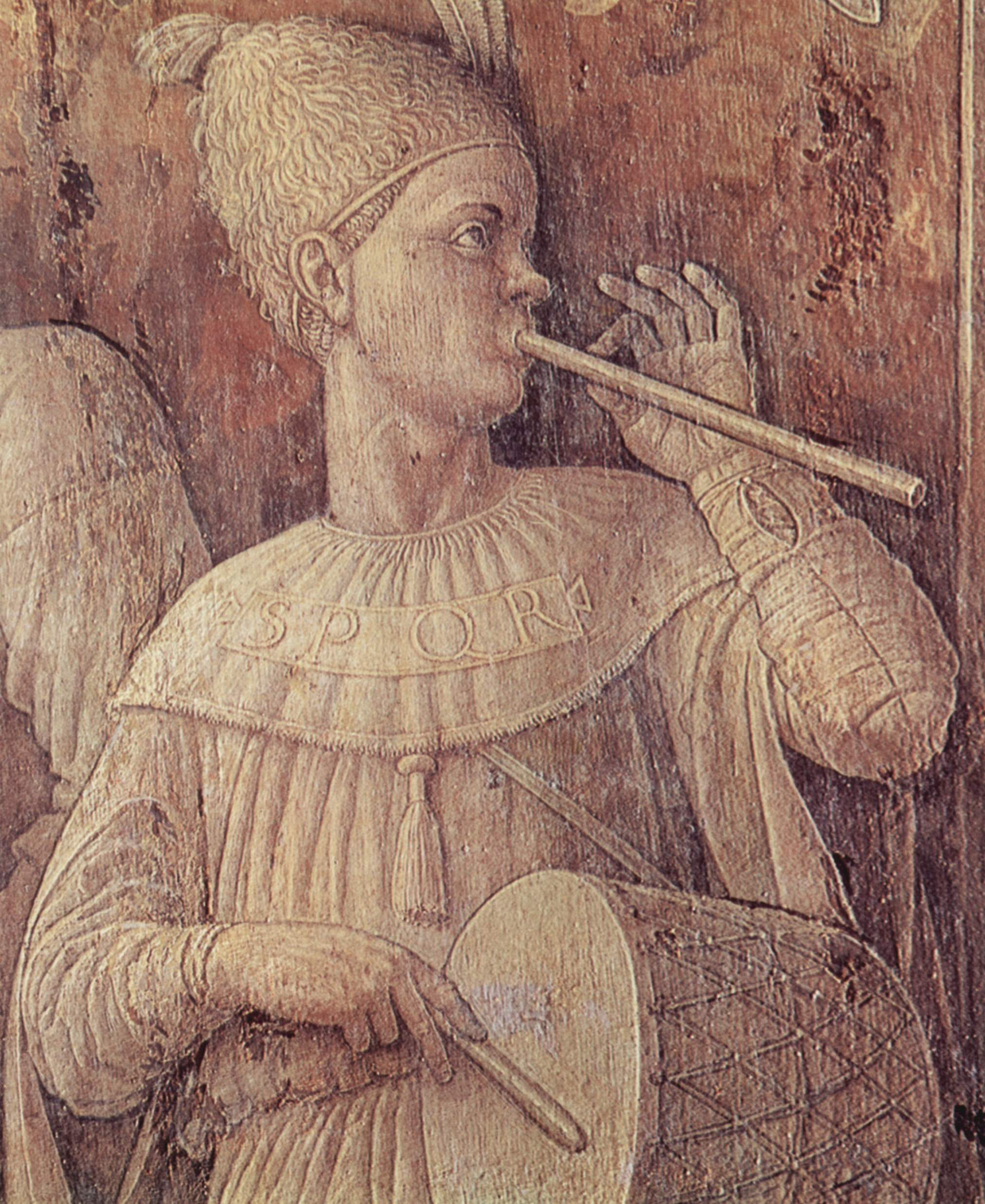
Triumph of Scipio from The Introduction of the Cult of Cybele at Rome (Andrea Mantegna)

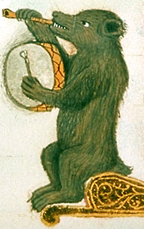
Whimsical depiction of a bear playing pipe and tabor, from a prayer book of the mid 15th century.

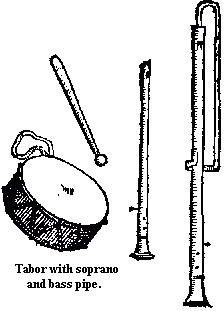
Tabor with soprano and bass pipe as depicted by Michael Praetorius

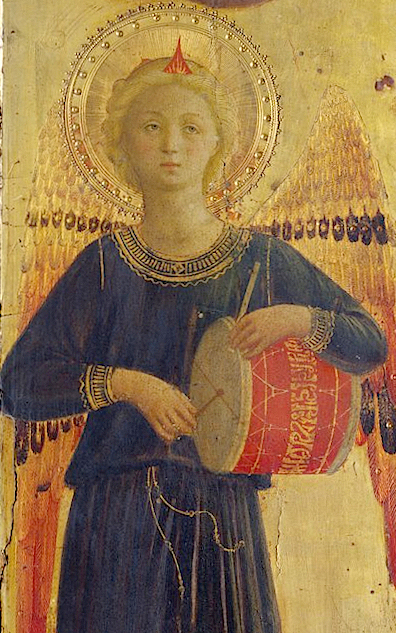
1433, Italy. Angel with pipe and tabor. The pipe is very short, possibly like a flabiol

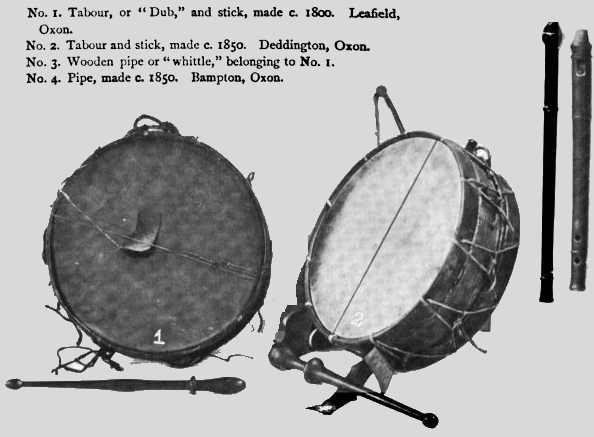
19th-century English pipes and tabors

We can see medieval representations of pipe and tabor in sculptures and illuminations from XIII century.

== English tradition and comparison with fife and drum ==
Fife, drum, pipe, and tabor are both combinations of a wind instrument played in its upper register accompanied by a drums. The fife, however, is a transverse (side-blown) flute, whereas the pipe is a fipple flute. The fife requires two hands, and thus the drummer must be a separate person. The fife and drum are associated with military marching. The pipe and tabor has a much longer history and is associated with civilian music and Court etiquette. It was used for dancing (for all classes of society), ceremonies and processions, folk customs and street entertainment.

Three-hole pipes made from bone and dating to the early Middle Ages have been found in England. There are images of medieval taborers in buildings, for example York Minster, Beverley Minster, Lincoln, Carlisle and Gloucester cathedrals, Rosslyn Chapel and Tewkesbury Abbey.

In the plays of Shakespeare's time clowns performed between acts, often dancing to the music of pipe and tabor.

The pipe and tabor are also known as whittle and dub and whit and dub (also spelled dubb) in some parts of the country. Pipe and tabor playing survived into the 20th century. It was close to extinction in the early part of the century, but a revival of interest occurred and the English pipe and tabor tradition remains alive in morris dancing, early music and all manner of cultural displays.

In the 20th century, the makers of Generation pennywhistles introduced an economical English tabor pipe made of metal and with a plastic mouthpiece. The English tabor has changed shape through its history and is now seen in a range of sizes and shapes according to the whim of the player. Traditionally it is played with a snare on the upper face, but today is sometimes played without.

== European tradition ==
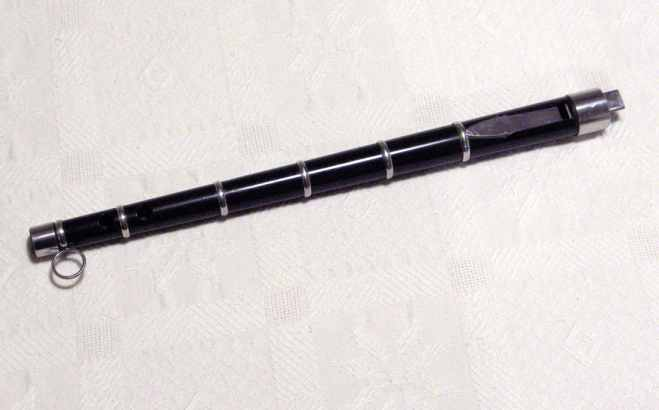
A txistu.

=== Iberian Peninsula and Pyrenees ===
The pipe and tabor, in various local forms, is popular in the Basque region. The txirula (high pitched flute) and the txistu are the two Basque forms of the three-hole tabor pipes tuned to the dorian mode. The pipe and tabor (danbolin in Basque, flauta tamborileira or flauta pastoril in Portuguese, fraita in Mirandês - the second official language of Portugal - tamboril in Spanish) is often played by groups of players in the Basque country.

Aside from its importance in the Basque region, in the Iberian Peninsula the pipe and tabor remains an important part of various regional traditions. The flauta and tamboril are typically used in the regions of León and Castille (most notably in León and Salamanca), Extremadura and Andalucía. The flauta or gaita and the tambor or tamboril are played in Huelva in celebrations, Cruces de Mayo, sword dances and romerías; in the music used around Romería of El Rocío (Huelva, Andalucía) this same pipe is denominated flauta rociera, gaita rociera or sometimes pito rociero (a higher pitched whistle).

Balearic Islands folklore also features a flute and a drum played together, as seen in the folk music and dances of islands Ibiza, Formentera and Mallorca.

=== Provence ===
In Provence a form of tabor pipe called the galoubet is played. Its scale begins a third below that of the English tabor pipe. The galoubet is accompanied on an exceptionally deep tabor known as the tambourin.

== American tradition ==
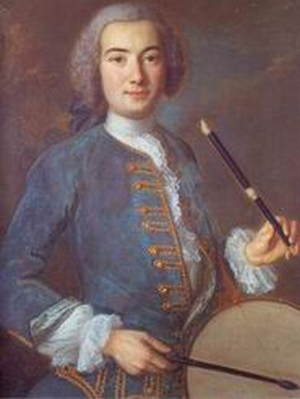
18th century tambourinaire with galoubet.

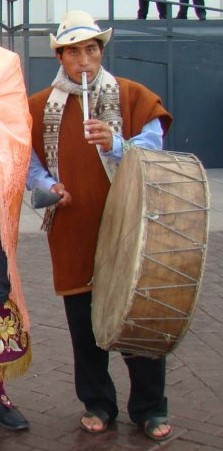
Pinkullo flute with tinya drum, Peru.

=== Latin America ===
From Spain, the pipe and tabor was carried to the Americas, where it continues to be used in some folk traditions. The Yaqui nation in Arizona and Mexico has its "Tamboristas", and the Tarahumara in the mountains of Chihuahua play a three-hole whistle (there is no back thumb hole) made from Arundo donax Cane. The tambor used with the whistle is a large diameter, double-headed skin drum. However, its wood frame, or shell, is very narrow, perhaps to save on total weight.

In the area of the Andes Mountains in Argentina, Bolivia, Chile, Ecuador and Peru, the combination of one-handed flute and drum exists as well. The Pinkillu flute and the Tinya drum have been adopted to the tradition. The drum is also played with a panflute, the antara.

=== United States and Canada ===
The revival of the English pipe and tabor occurred to some extent throughout the Anglophone world, including the United States and Canada. One of the largest manufacturers of tabor pipes today is the Kelischeck Workshop, in North Carolina, makers of the Susato line of instruments.

A similar tradition existed in the United States of playing the panpipes together with a tambourine.

== See also ==
- Fipple
- Flabiol
- Flageolet
- Jacques de Vaucanson
- Morris dance
- Psalterium (instrument)
