= Ederlezi =

Ederlezi may refer to:

- the Romani name of the Hıdırellez spring festival
- Ederlezi (song)
- A pastoral (theatre of Soule) played in 2013 in Gotein-Libarrenx, France.
- The latest collection of fine jewelry pieces launched by Nadia Petrova Joyeria y Decoracion.

== See also ==
- Đurđevdan (Saint George's Day in Spring)
