= Maskarada (carnival of Soule) =

Itinerant set of traditional dances, theatre acts and parades

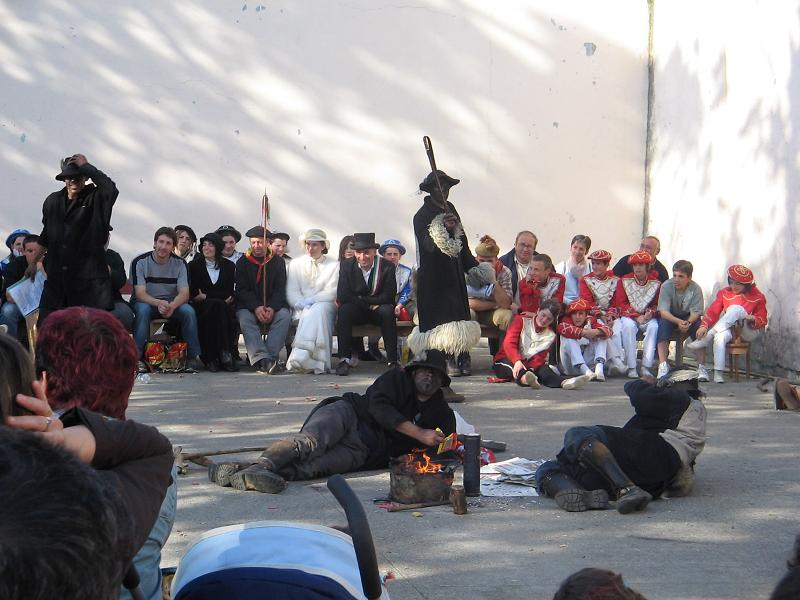
Maskarada actors lying by the bonfire at Eskiula

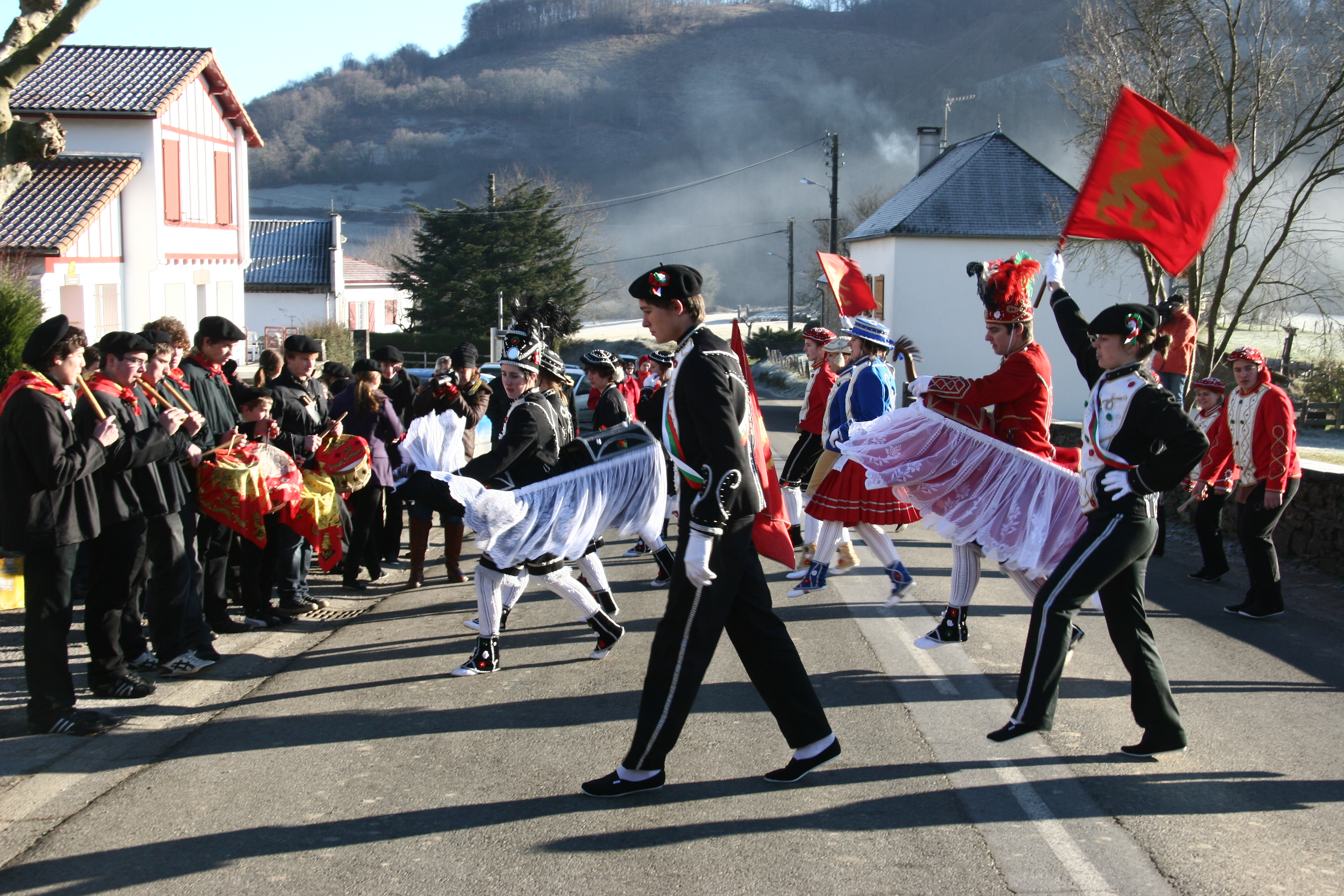
2009 maskarada in Barkoxe

The maskarada [mas̺ˈkaɾada] is an itinerant set of traditional dances, theatre acts, and parades that take place annually in different towns and villages across the Basque region of Soule, France (Zuberoa in Basque), during the time of carnival.

== Background ==
It is generally referred to in the plural (maskaradak) as it is repeated across the region on the streets of villages (one day per village) over the span of a month or two in late winter through spring. The plays are performed by the villages' (usually younger) inhabitants, and the arrangements for each maskarada are the responsibility of each participating village, sometimes sharing arrangements with other villages.

Though naturally the actors change from year to year, a friendly air of informality, formed of deep familiarity, pervades throughout. The Maskaradak follow variations on very traditional themes that make use of time-honoured sets and age-old, immutable characters. A motley parade of musicians (atabal, ttun-ttun and xirula players), traditional dancers, and assorted actors, villagers, and visitors walk merrily along a route that meanders up and down the village's streets.

At particular points of the parade, the barrikadak take place, where the marchers stop in front of a stall put there by the villagers, and bestow on them a dance, sometimes even a song, in exchange for snacks (biscuits, crisps, and the like), and refreshments (wine and liquor), which are then shared with bystanders. The process is repeated over and over, lasting all day, from early in the morning till afternoon (with a popular lunch in the middle), until the end of the final performance at the parade terminus – usually the village market place or Basque pelota court.

Maskaradas represent a genuine example of traditional popular carnival theatre struggling to survive, much in step with the modest revival of the Basque language. It's connected to pastoral in many aspects, such as recurrent fixed characters, a marked distinction in the group (e.g., the reds stand for the good, while the blacks represent the evil) or a rigid structuring and development. The language used by the actors remains bilingual Zuberoan Basque, for the most part, and Bearnais, despite some difficulties in handing either language over to new generations.
