= Willow flute =

Overtone flute of Russia and Ukraine, Norway, Sweden, Finland

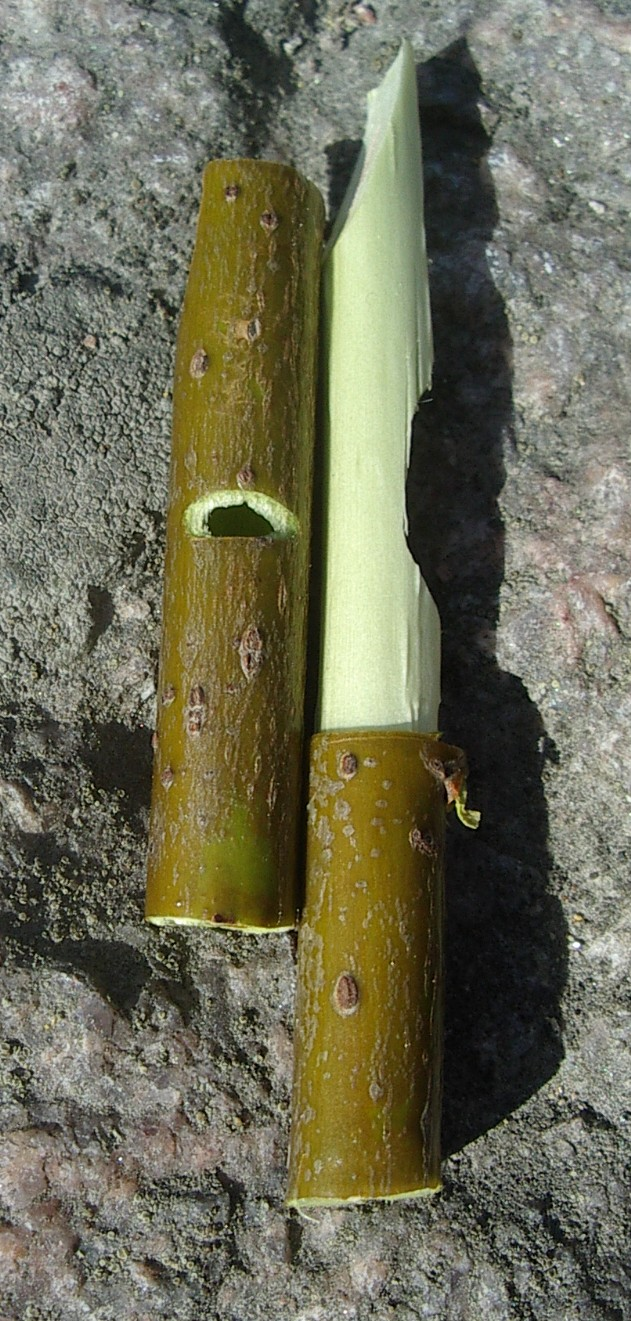

The willow flute, also known as sallow flute (Norwegian: seljefløyte, Swedish: sälgflöjt or sälgpipa, Finnish: pitkähuilu or a general term pajupilli, Latvian: kārkla stabule, Lithuanian: švilpynė), is a Nordic folk flute, or whistle, consisting of a simple tube with a transverse fipple mouthpiece and no finger holes. The mouthpiece is typically constructed by inserting a grooved plug into one end of the tube, and cutting an edged opening in the tube a short distance away from the plug.

Similar but not identical instruments were made by peasants in Poland, usually using a different method described in sources as "kręcenie" (that nowadays means literally "rolling", at that time possibly also "drilling-gouging"), "ukręcanie", "ulinianie" (nowadays literally meaning: "making moulted"). Such instruments are mentioned in folk poems or songs.

The willow flute is a type of overtone flute. It is played by varying the force of the air blown into the mouthpiece, with the end of the tube being covered by the finger or left open. The tones produced are based on the harmonic series. Playing the instrument with the end of the tube covered produces one fundamental and its overtones, playing it with the end of the tube left open produces another fundamental and series of overtones. Willow flutes cannot play an equal tempered scale.

Modern willow flutes are typically made of plastic (PVC tubing is often used), but the original willow flutes were made from sections of bark cut from green willow branches. Willow flutes could only be made this way during the spring, and became unplayable when the bark dried out.

There is also a Karelian variant of the willow flute that is made in Finnish Karelia and the Russian Republic of Karelia. It is made the same way as the willow flute, but instead of willow bark, it is made out of birch bark. The Karelian Folk Music Ensemble, based out of Petrozavodsk in Russian Karelia, uses this instrument in their music.

== Kalyuka ==
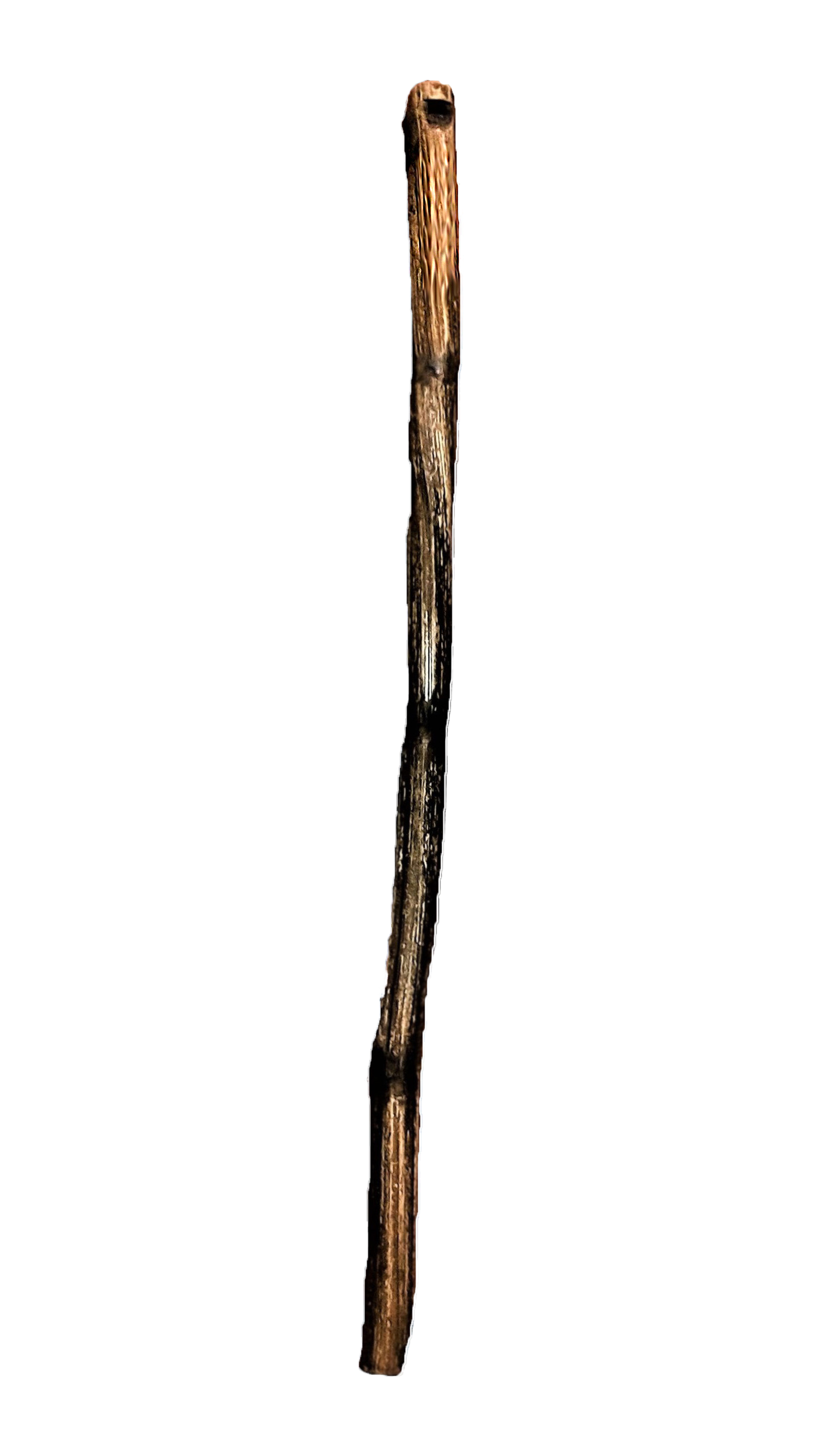
A kalyuka made out of hogweed

The kalyuka (or kolyuka, Russian: калюка, колюка) is a Russian and Ukrainian overtone flute, lacking playing holes. Traditionally, kalyukas were made from hollow plant stems, such as motherwort, or angelica. Modern versions of the instrument are usually made from PVC, an inexpensive and durable substitute.

The upper end of the kalyuka is open, and although it has a built-in fipple to produce sound, a player should also partly close the opening of the tube with the tongue. The lower end of the tube is also open and occasionally there is a small side hole near the end. The side hole and/or end are opened and closed while playing to produce different notes (like the Slovak koncovka). Higher tones are reached through over blowing.

In Eastern traditions, the kalyuka was played on summer evenings after the hay harvest when the suitable weeds, cut with a scythe, were available to make one, and was accompanied by percussion instruments.

The existence of the tradition was uncovered in 1980 by students of the Moscow and St. Petersburg Conservatories.

== Noted artists ==
Noted modern willow flute artists include the group Hedningarna and Anders Norudde of Sweden. Other Nordic groups that use the Seljefløyte in traditional arrangements include Eivind Groven, Steinar Ofsdal, Lillebjørn Nilsen, Groupa, Bask, Ruumen, Ojajärvi Blom Ojajärvi, Hurja Halla, Tuultenpesä and Tapani Varis Collective.

== See also ==
- Fujara, an overtone-based folk flute from Slovakia
- Koncovka, another Slovakian overtone-based folk flute
- Naturskalaen, Eivind Groven's short book on why he believed that the willow flute's scale was the basis of Norwegian folk music phrasing.
- The Celtic Lyre. The Preface explains why the willow flute and natural instruments like it may have been the originators of Gaelic song melodies.
- www.overtoneflute.fi/home Self-study material for playing willow flute

== Bibliography ==
- Ivanov A.N. Volshebnaia fleita yuzhnorusskogo folklora. Sokhranenie i vozrozhdenie folklornykh traditsyi. 2nd edition. Moscow, 1993.
- Banin A.A. Russkaia instrumentalnaia muzyka folklornoi traditsii. Moscow, 1997. (p. 85)
