= Xirula =

Musical instrument

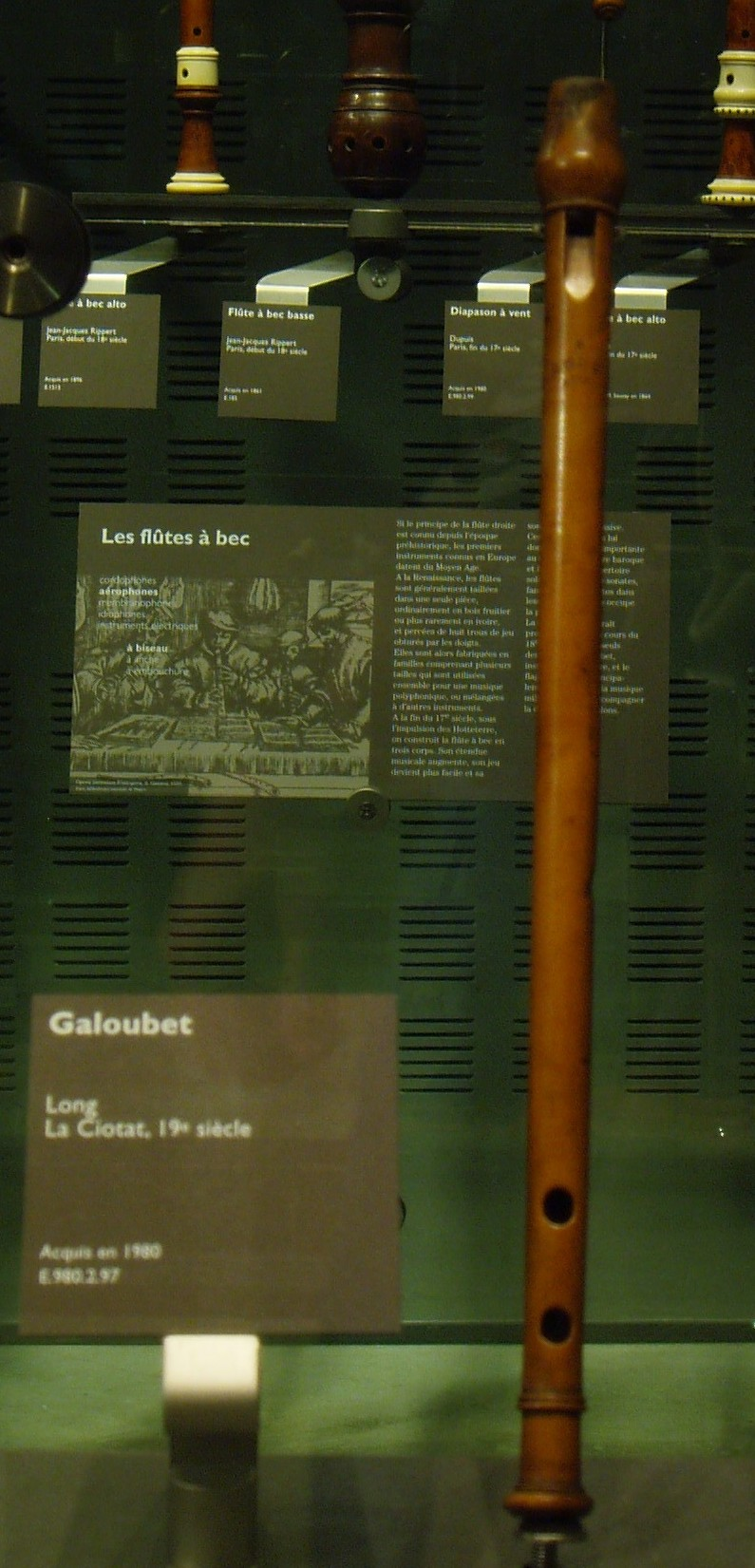
- Classification: Woodwind; Wind; Aerophone

Related instruments
- Frula; Ney; Duduk; Flute; Jedinka; Dilli Kaval; Shvi; Kaval; Flabiol

Xirula being played

The xirula (Basque pronunciation: [ʃiˈɾula], spelled chiroula in French, also pronounced txirula, (t)xülüla in Zuberoan Basque; Gascon: flabuta; French: galoubet) is a small three holed woodwind instrument or flute usually made of wood akin to the Basque txistu or three-hole pipe, but more high pitched and strident, tuned to D/G and an octave higher than the silbote. The sound that flows from the flute has often been perceived as a metaphor for the tweet cadences of bird songs. Some scholars point out that flutes found in the Caverns of Isturitz and Oxozelaia going back to a period spanning 35,000 to 10,000 years ago bear witness to the early presence of the instrument's forerunner in the region, while this view has been disputed.

== Extent ==
It is an instrument characteristic of the Pyrenees, and it is played on the French side of the Basque Country (the extent of its use has shrunk over the years, having long been supplanted in Labourd and Basse-Navarre by the txistu), where it provides along with the atabal (a tabor-like instrument played with drumsticks) the musical background for various traditional dances. Besides performing the music for dances, in the former viscounty of Soule (Zuberoa in Basque) it may enliven accompanied on both the ttun-ttun and the atabal the traditional carnival-time performances called maskaradak as well as the pastorals, age-old region-specific theatre plays popular in the area.

Similar variants have been used to the west and east of the Basque Country up to the 1950s, with some examples occasionally jumping to the spotlight in special events, e.g. the so-called "gigantillos" (dancing characters with magnified masks and costumes) dancing to the tunes of the "chirola" in Burgos (Spain). The "silbu" and "chiflo" from Cantabria and Aragón show similar features. The instrument is still used in the vallée d'Ossau in Béarn, and has undergone a revival in parts of Les Landes.

== Players ==
Main xirula activity focuses in Soule, where xirula's musical revival is led by Jean-Mixel Bedaxagar (1953) along with Mixel Etxekopar (1963).
