= Koncovka =

Slovak musical instrument

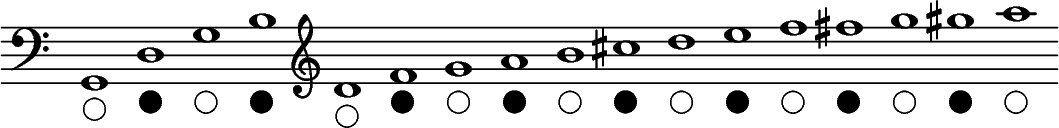
Notes available on a koncovka made in the key of G. Notes played with the end closed are marked with "●", and notes played with the end open are marked with "○".

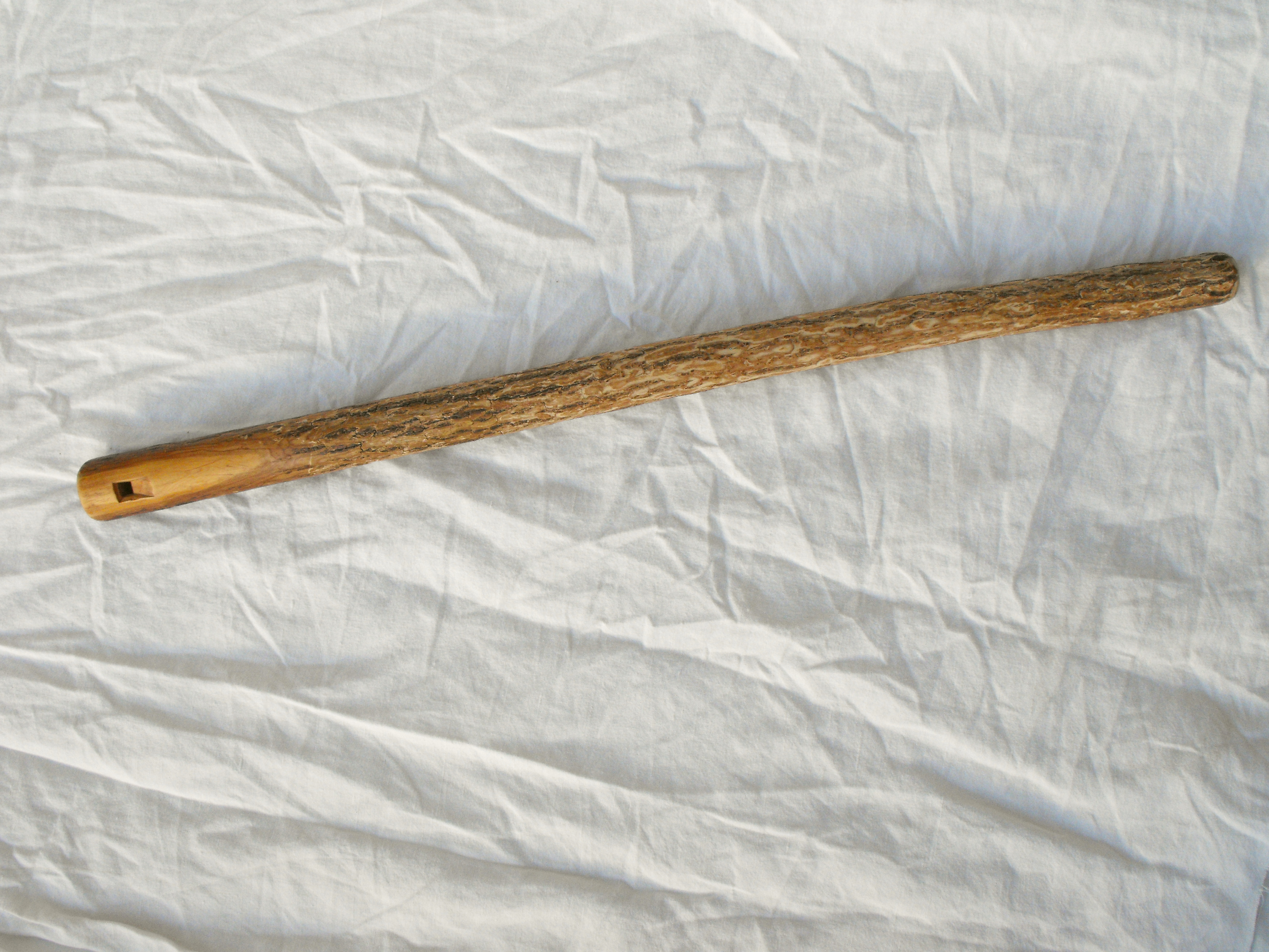
Nature look koncovka.

Koncovka, a Slovak overtone flute

The koncovka is a Slovak duct-blown overtone fipple flute without finger holes, traditionally played by shepherds. The koncovka is played by closing and opening the bottom hole of the flute. By increasing the air speed, two different harmonic series of notes can be played with the end either open or closed. Traditional koncovka melodies use the partial Lydian scale available on this instrument.

== See also ==
- Fujara, another Slovak overtone-based shepherds flute
- Willow flute, a Scandinavian overtone-based folk flute
