= Tambourin =

French tenor drum

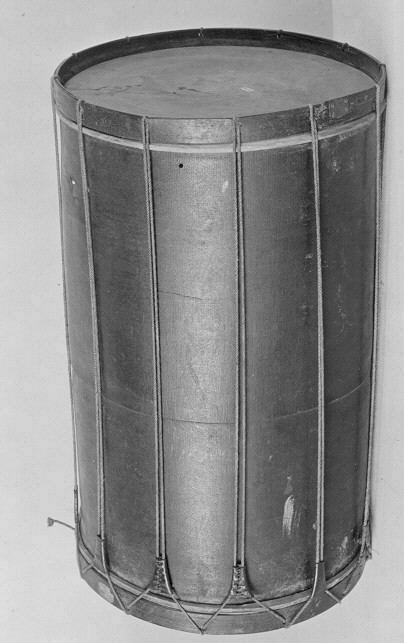
The tambourin de Provence.

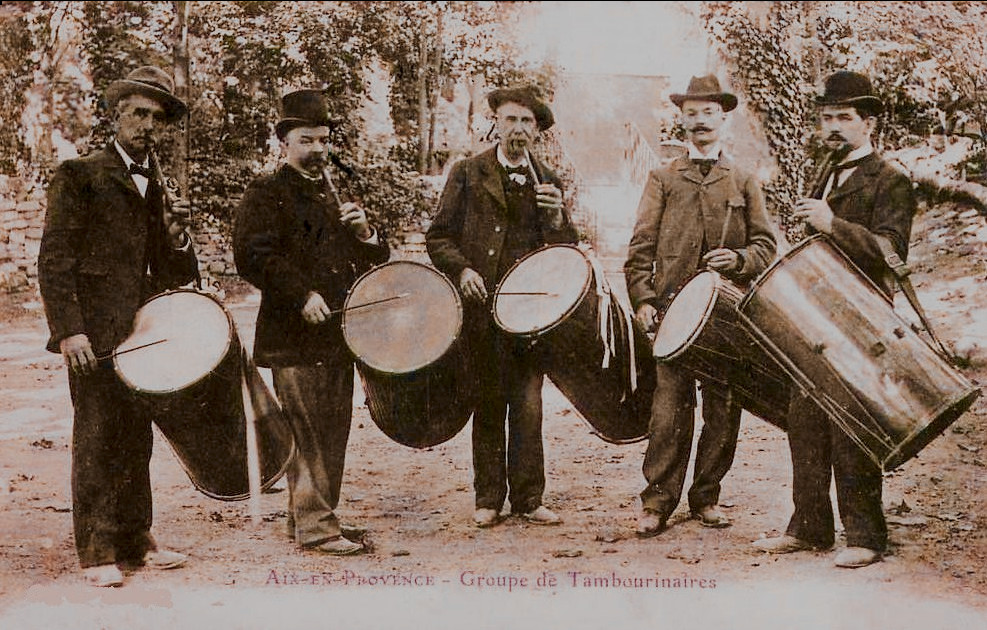
Tambourin players in the early 1900s in Aix-en-Provence

The tambourin (Occitan: tamborin) is a low-pitched tenor drum of the French region of Provence, which has also lent its name to a Provençal dance accompanied by lively duple meter music. The dance is so named because the music imitates the drum (tambour being a generic French term for "drum"), usually as a repetitive not-very-melodic figure in the bass.

== Description ==
A deep, two-headed drum of Arabic origin, called the tambourin [de Provence], is mentioned as early as the 1080s and noted as the "tabor" in the Chanson de Roland. This type of instrument, commonly found in the Provence region of France, is played by a musician who wears the drum on a strap hanging from the player's left arm and elbow. The player strikes the drum head with a beater held in the right hand, and plays a little pipe with their left hand. The combination of the tambourin, played together with a small flute, known as the galoubet or flabiol, forms a Provençal pipe and tabor.

== Dance ==
Jean-Philippe Rameau included tambourins in many of his operas, such as Platée, Les Indes galantes, and Les fêtes d'Hébé. The last gained more fame in a keyboard arrangement from the E minor suite of his Pièces de Clavecin. The tambourin was popular throughout the 18th century and can be found in Handel's Alcina and Gluck's Iphigénie en Aulide, among others.

== Instrumental music ==
Jean-Marie Leclair used a tambourin as the last movement of his Sonata for Violin, Op. 9, No. 3. This sonata is often mistakenly referred to as "Le Tombeau", which is actually his violin sonata in C minor, Op. 5, No. 6.

== Gallery ==
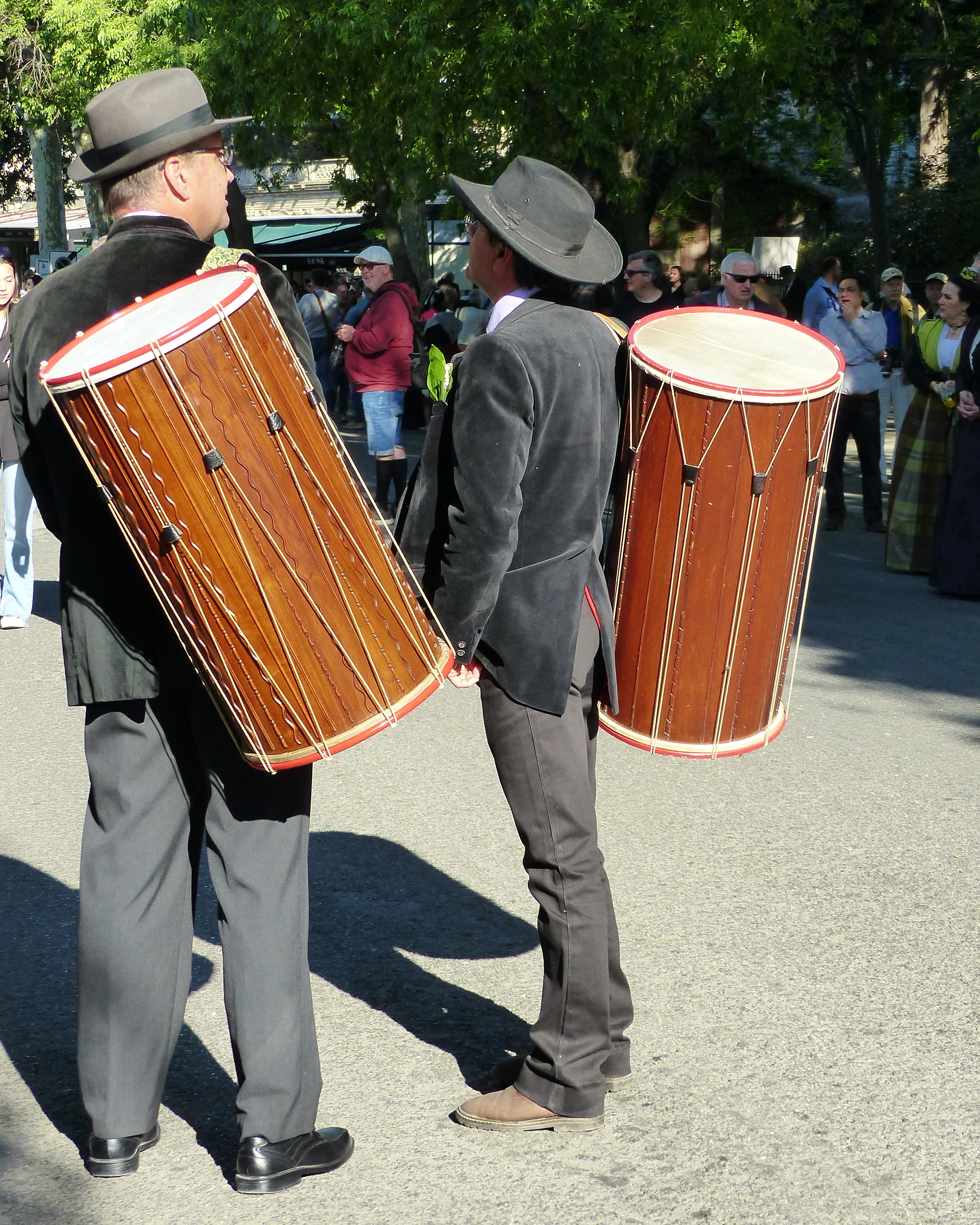
Modern tambourin players in 2023

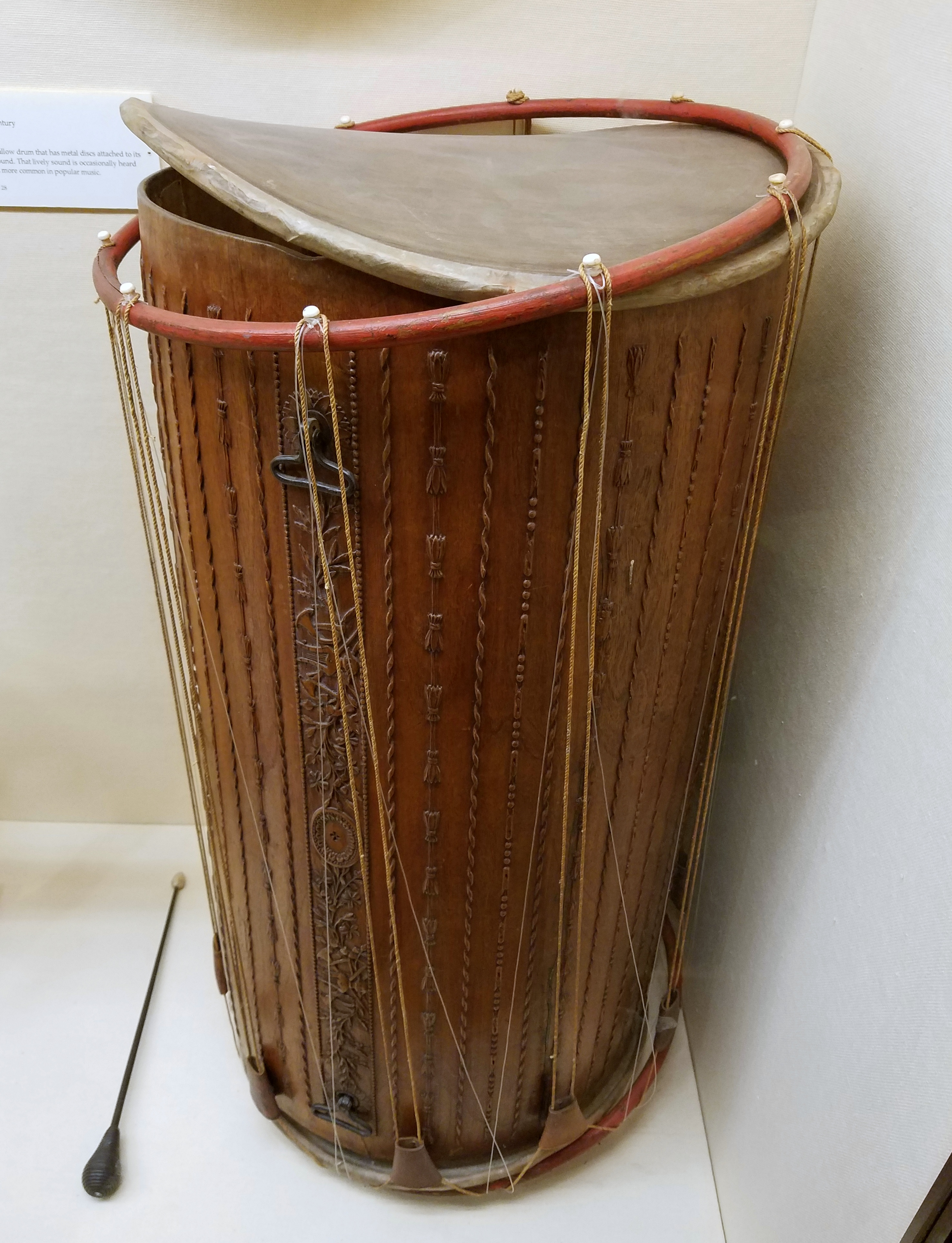
Early 1800s tambourin in color
