= Zuffolo =

Italian fipple flute

Pipe
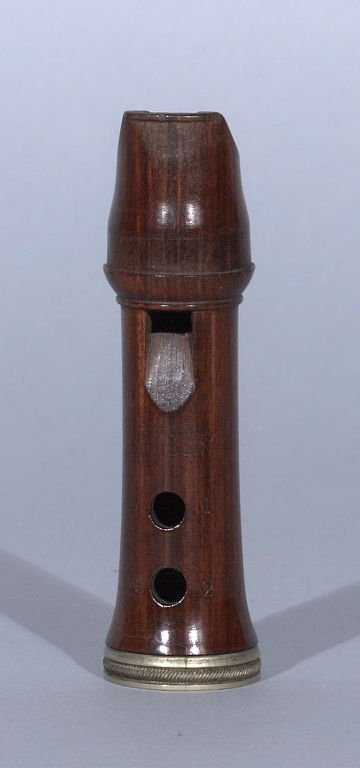
- Classification: Wind; Woodwind

Playing range
- 1-2 octaves

Related instruments
- Pipe and tabor; Recorder

Zuffolo (also chiufolo, ciufolo) is an Italian fipple flute. First described in the 14th century, it has a rear thumb-hole, two front finger-holes, and a conical bore. It is approximately 8 cm in length and has a range of over two octaves, from B_{3} to C_{6} (Marcuse 1975c). It is similar in appearance to the recorder. A larger instrument of the same name, with a lowest note of C5 appeared in the early 17th century (Fuller-Maitland, Baines, and Térey-Smith 2001).

In Sicily, zuffolo refers to a longer beak flute of about 29 cm, with a wide bore and six equally spaced finger-holes (Marcuse 1975c).

In the late 17th and early 18th centuries, it was also called the "flautino" (Lasocki 2001), flauto piccolo, and flautino piccolo, and is sometimes spelled zufolo.

Known as the Picco pipe and marketed as a toy until early in the 20th century, the instrument was popularized in London in 1856, either as a toy by a blind Italian musician named Picco (Marcuse 1975a), or by a blind Sardinian player at Covent Garden (Grove).

The zuffolo is the smallest form of ducted-flue tabor pipe or flute-a-bec, at 3½" long, with the windway taking up 1½". It has only three holes: two in front and a dorsal thumb hole. It has the same mouthpiece as a recorder. The bore end hole of the picco pipe has a small flare, and the lowest notes were played with a finger blocking this end. The range is from b to c3, using the slight frequency shift between registers to sound a full chromatic scale, like the tabor pipe (Dayton C. Miller Collection).

== Relatives ==
In northern Europe a very similar instrument is known by various names from the 14th until at least the 17th century. The earliest source is a 14th-century Flemish manuscript copy of De planctu naturae by Alain de Lille, which includes drawings of eleven different types of instruments, including two of duct flutes. One of these is a one-handed flute with three front finger-holes and one thumb-hole. It is labeled, together with another instrument, with the generic Latin term "fistula" and with the Middle Dutch word "floyt" (Lasocki 2011, 18–19). In the early 16th century, a woodcut showing this same type of instrument is labeled "Russpfeiff" (from MHGer Rusch, "rush") in Virdung (1511, [unpaginated]). This name is spelled "Rüspfeiff" in Agricola (1529, fol. 5r), where the same instrument is also referred to as a "klein Flötlein mit 4 löchern" (small little flute with four holes) (Marcuse 1975b; Wasielewski 1878, 83). At the beginning of the next century, Michael Praetorius depicted this instrument once again in the supplement (Theatrum Instrumentorum) to the second volume of his Syntagma Musicum, where he uses the expressions "gar kleine Plockflötlein" (very small little recorder), "garklein Flötlein" (very small little flute), and "klein Flötlein" (small little flute). He gives the size of this instrument as about three or four Brunswick inches, its range as nearly two octaves, and its playing technique as involving "unten zum Ausgang darneben mit eim Finger regiret werden" (regulated by means of a finger under the outlet). The lowest open tone is shown in the woodcut as C_{6}, but Praetorius does not say how much lower the instrument can be made to speak by using the finger to shade the bell opening (Praetorius 1619, 34, supplement Plate IX).

== See also ==
- Panpipes
- Pipers' Guild
