= Txistu =

Basque fipple flute

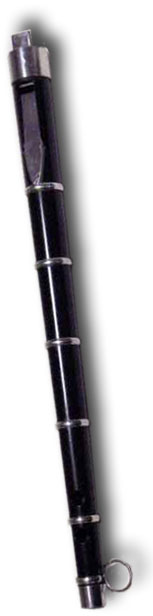
A txistu

The txistu (Basque pronunciation: [ˈtʃis̺tu]) is a kind of fipple flute that became a symbol for the Basque folk revival. The name may stem from the general Basque word ziztu "to whistle" with palatalisation of the z (cf zalaparta > txalaparta). This three-hole pipe can be played with one hand, leaving the other one free to play a percussion instrument.

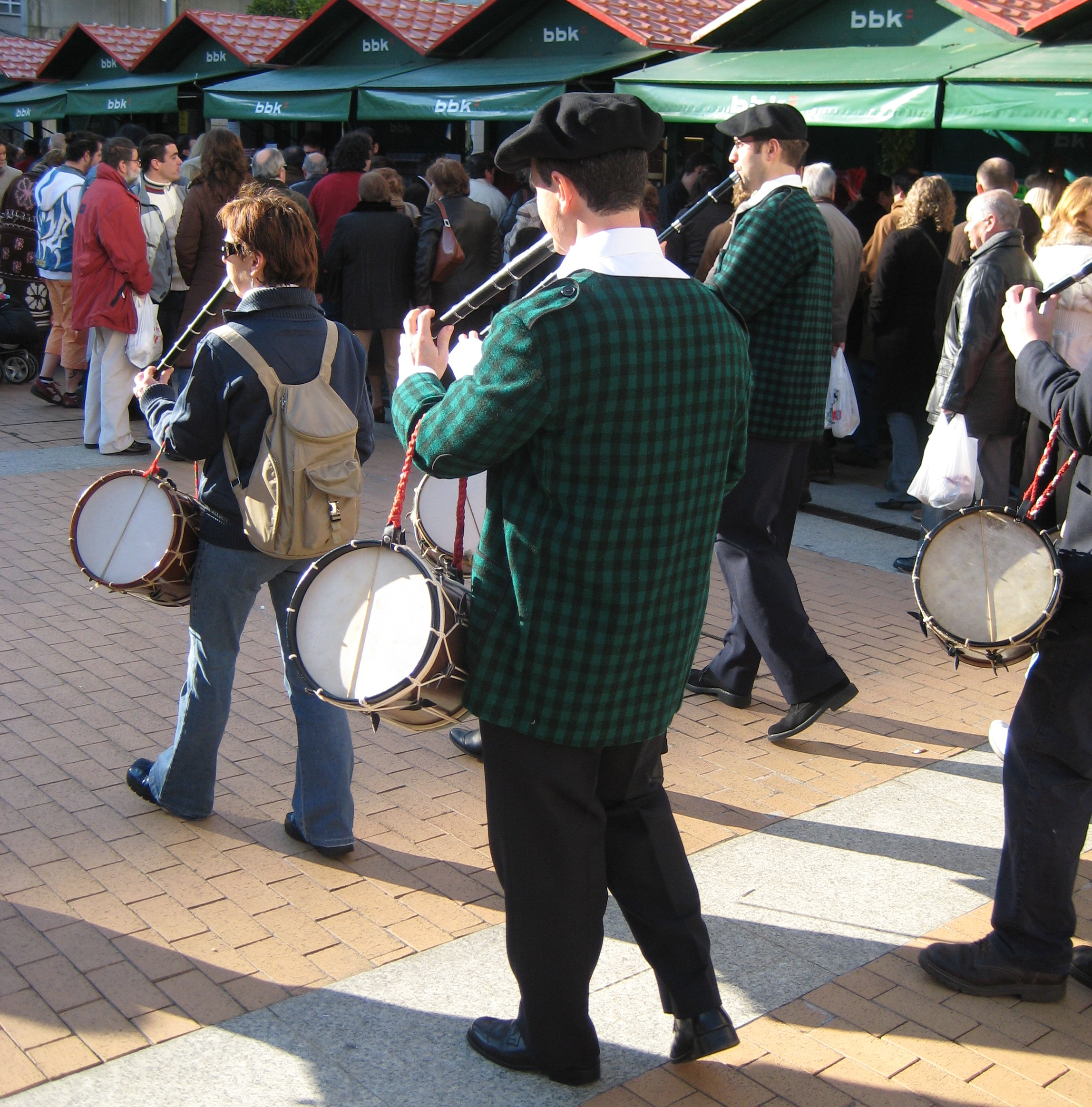
Parade of a txistu ensemble in Leioa (Biscay)

Evidence of the txistu first mentioned as such goes back to 1864. Yet it is apparent that it was used earlier, although it is not easy to establish when it started out; actually, it is impossible to do so, the txistu being the result of an evolution of the upright flutes widespread as early as the Late Middle Ages, when minstrels scattered all over the Iberian Peninsula brought in instruments that locals, noblemen first and common people later took on and developed. At the beginning, txistu players (txistularis) were named in romance written records after the tabor (pipe and tabor were played together): tamborer, tamborino, tambolín, tamborín, tamboril, músico tamboril, tamborilero, tamboriltero. However, when named after the flute, they are called in Spanish pífano, silbato, silbo, silbo vizcaíno or chilibistero.

The three-hole flute was no doubt used by people in much of Spain and western Europe not only in the Basque Country, but recordings of Basque names for the instrument turn up later: txilibitu, txirula, txirola, txürula, txulula, txilibitulari, txilibistari. While some instruments fell into decay, from the Renaissance on the three-hole flute raised its profile and increasingly took on the length as we know it today (42 cm) in the western Basque Country. In contrast, the (t)xirula, the version that prevailed on the eastern Basque Country (Soule, Labourd and Navarre) remained shorter in size. At that point, three-hole flutes were made of wood (despite some instances of flutes made in bone).

Up to the 18th century, since chistu was played along the pattern of tabor and pipe, it needed no tuning; yet in the 18th century the chistu was adopted by the Count of Peñaflorida and his Basque Enlightenment cultural revival, and became a part of Basque aspirations for the nobility, resulting in more instruments (usually other chistus) joining the pair, so they started to be tuned. The instrument was modified to give it a range of two octaves, and a larger version called in Spanish the silbote was fashioned to accompany polyphonic compositions. Rural txistu musicians continued their own traditions with self crafted rustic txistus, while the urban txistularis formed schools to teach the brand-new sophisticated instrument.

At different stages of the three-hole flute's history reeds and metal mouthpieces were applied for a better sound. While some claim that it is closely related to the early link of the Basques to iron and the forging industry, others suggest that the embedding of such pieces began in the industrial revolution of the 19th century.

The oldest txistu melodies are characterized by a Mixolydian mode in G, which is the same as the seventh mode in Gregorian chanting. More recently composed songs are still in G major, but in either natural or sharp F or, more rarely, C. There are exceptions, however, in major F melodies with natural B.

The Association of Txistularies in the Basque Country was formed in 1927 to promote txistularis. The organization has continued its activities to the present, except for an interruption during the period of Francoist Spain.
