= Frédéric Chalon =

French musician

Frédéric Chalon was a French musician born in the 18th century.

He was the son of a violinist who played at the Opéra of Paris, and about 1801 he became a flutist and oboist at the Théâtre Feydeau and Théâtre de l'Opéra Comique to 1821. He is noted for being the author of eight collections of pieces for two flutes and for two clarinets, as well as one method for english horn, one for oboe and another for flageolet, an instrument for which he composed several duets.
