= Pastoral (theatre of Soule) =

Folk theatre genre from the Basque Country

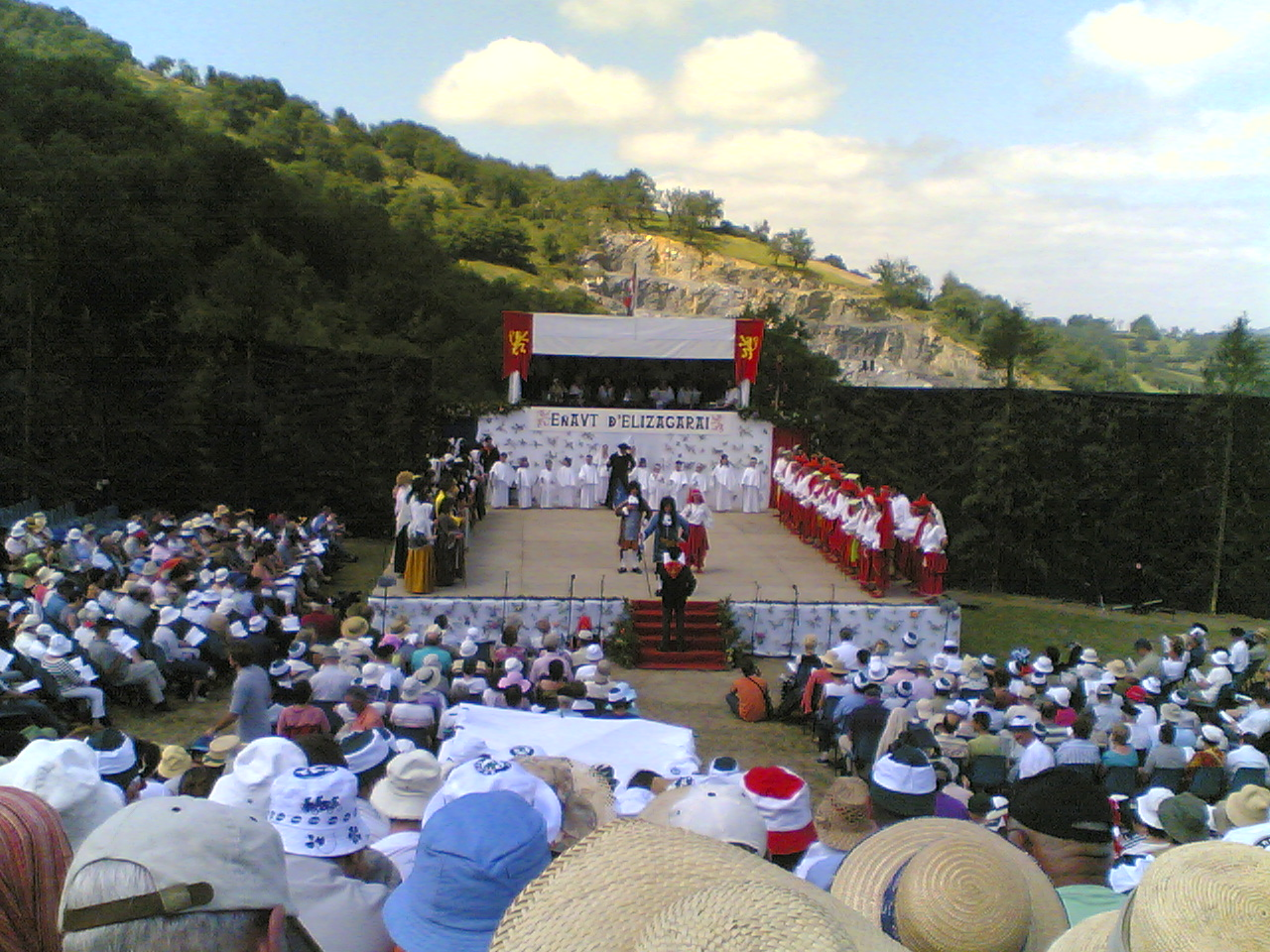
An act of a pastoral

The pastoral is a traditional kind of play from the Basque Country held in the region of Soule (Zuberoa in Basque), France. It features a set range of characters and acts repeated on all pieces. This kind of theatre represents a dualism between the wicked (dressed in red, called türkak or satanak, literally 'the Turkish' or 'the Demons') and the righteous (blue outfit, called kiristiak, 'the Christians'). On every new creation, a different story is staged, where verses are recited in Zuberoan Basque by the players following a pre-established stance and steps on the scene. Singing and dance play an important role too, the performance actually culminating with a choral staging where the collective spirit is voiced. The development of the story is supported by a brass-band and/or the xirula and the psalterium (ttun-ttun).

Unlike the other traditional theatrical event of Soule, the maskarada, the pastoral is not a comedy but a tragedy, revolving around a main character, a hero of historical significance, linked to the region or the Basque Country, while prior to the second half of the 20th century the characters portrayed were religious or French national icons. Back then women were banned from playing in the pastorals too, with female roles being performed by men. During the revival of the event in the decades following World War II, this rule was overturned and currently women take part normally in the plays.
