= Tabor (instrument) =

Type of snare drum

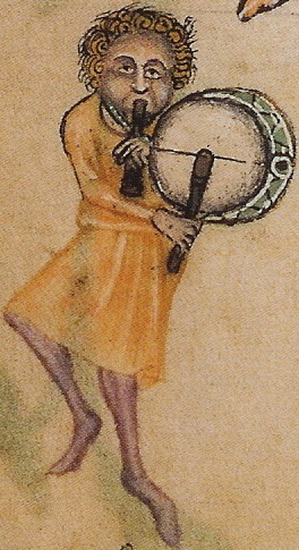
- Pipe and tabor player, c. 1325–1335
- Classification: Unpitched percussion instrument

Related instruments
- Pipe and tabor; Snare drum; Fife and drum

A tabor, tabour, tabret (Welsh: Tabwrdd), tambour de Provence, Provençal tambourin or Catalan tamborí is a double-skinned portable drum, often with a gut snare on the batter head, typically played with a single stick in the right hand. It is often used to provide a rhythm to accompany a tune played simultaneously by the same player on a pipe. This combination is known as pipe and tabor. The word "tabor" (formerly sometimes spelt "taber") is an English variant of the Persian word tabīr, meaning "drum"—cf. Catalan: tambor, French: tambour, Italian: tamburo Militaries may use the tabor as a marching instrument; it can accompany parades and processions.

== Construction ==
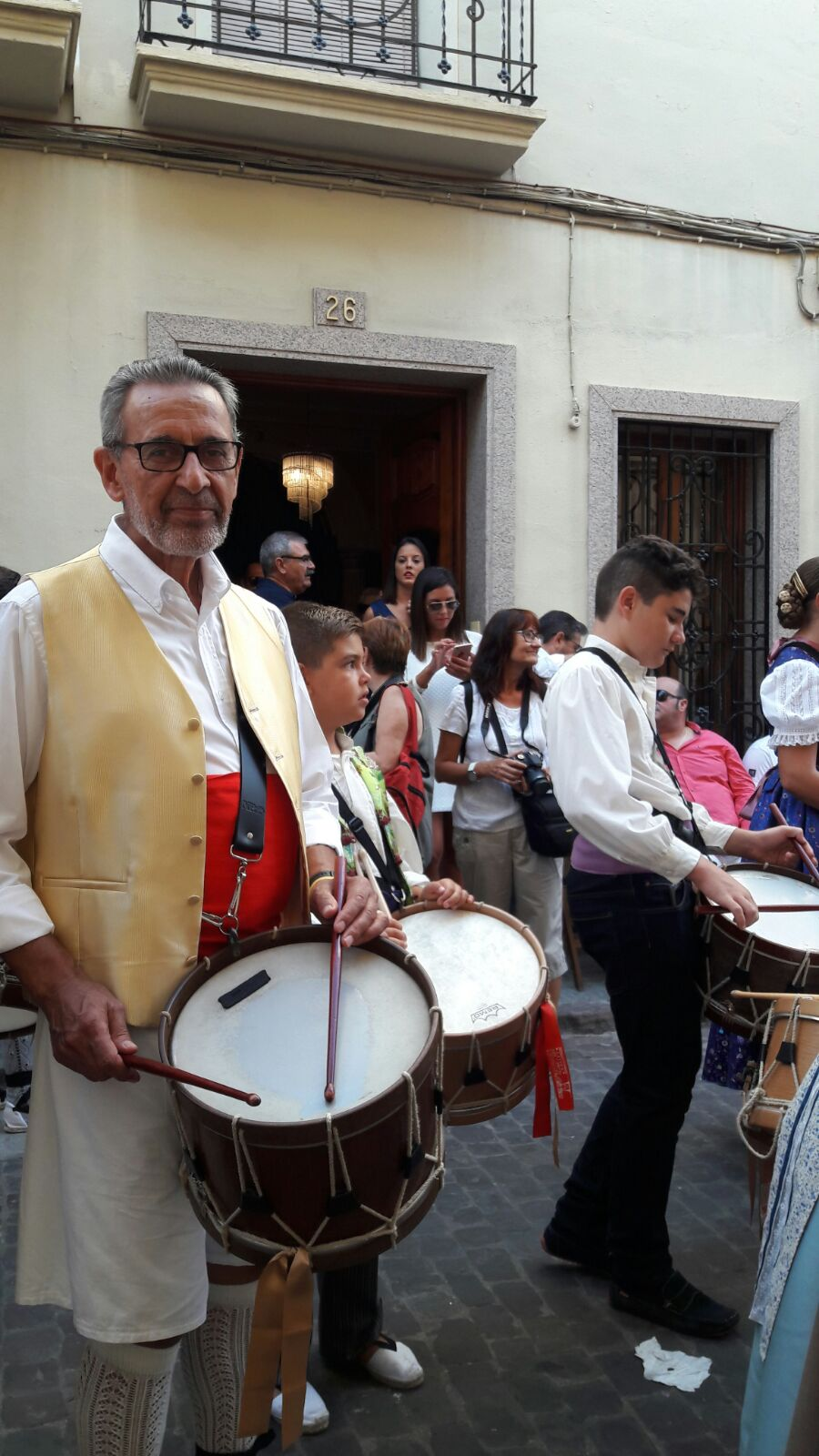
Valencian tabor player

A tabor has a cylindrical wood shell, two skin heads tightened by rope tension, a leather strap, and an adjustable snare. The single snare can be made from gut, silk, or rough hemp. Each tabor has a pitch range of about an octave: the larger the tabor, the lower the pitch. It is played by just one short conical stick, made from bone or ivory, which usually strikes the snare head. The tabor is suspended by a strap from the forearm, somewhere between the elbow and wrist. When played, the shell is virtually parallel with the ground. In Catalonia, the tamborí remains in use since the Middle Ages, usually played together with the flabiol or pipe by the same musician. In Spain, a deep drum is used for a tabor by pipe and taborers, and in England a shallow tom tom is sometimes used, although medieval icons of pipe and tabor usually display a large shallow tabor similar in shape to a bodhrán.

== Usage ==
The tabor is most widely known as accompaniment for the pipe and other small flutes, such as the flageolet, and most famously as the percussive element in the "pipe and tabor" one-man band configuration. The tabor is beaten on the snare side.

Georges Bizet scored for the tabor drum in his L'Arlesienne Suite No. 2, and Aaron Copland calls for it in his Appalachian Spring and El Salón México. Darius Milhaud has been named one of the foremost composers of modern (mid-20th century) music for the tabor by Morris Goldenberg. His Suite Provancale calls for tabor played along with two other drums by a single player. In classical repertoire the tabor is usually played with two sticks, as many pieces call for speeds that are unwieldy for a single hand. In many cases composers' scores have been mistranslated with the erroneous call for tambour de basque or tambourine when the piece was originally intended for tabor. Parts written for tabor are usually very simple and feature straight eight notes or another easy repetitive pattern.

== History ==
One-handed roll performed on a Tabor

The tabor is classified as a membranophone and dates back to the Medieval period in Europe. Hand-written documents and engravings are some of the earliest recordings of this instrument. The size of these early tabors ranged approximately 11-12 inches in diameter and 4-10 inches in width/depth. These 13th century tabors were thus larger across their diameter, but the tabor continued to evolve with time and eventually some were almost even in diameter and width. The 16th century design of the tabor changed to the opposite proportions from the earlier models with the width being greater.

Tabors were constructed of wood for the body of the drum with the stretched membrane made out of some type of skin. It was primarily used outdoors. The tabor is a precursor to the side drum.

The common way of playing the tabor together with the pipe produced the effect of a single person band. It was often played for dancing, and was sometimes played as a small ensemble with the bagpipes. Since the tabor was used to accompany dancing, regular rhythmic beats were common for this instrument. The pipe and tabor was the original instrument used to accompany the Cotswold tradition of Morris style folk dancing.

Initial documents show that a type of horn was played with the tabor, which then later led into the pipe and tabor duo. This combination flourished in musical performances between the 13th-16th century and was connected with nobility. The tabor together with the pipe had the ability to make complicated musical timing meters. The tabor was also played solo. By the 15th century the size of the tabor increased. Players used two sticks instead of the original single stick to hit on the membrane. The larger 2-sticked version was predominantly used in military contexts, while the smaller single-sticked tabor was retained for dance music. Tabor use decreased by the mid-17th century. The tabor did continue to evolve throughout the 19th and into the 20th century. The tabor style is still used as the tambourin de Provence.

== See also ==
- Davul
- Dhol
- Dohol
- Dunun
