= Pipers' Guild =

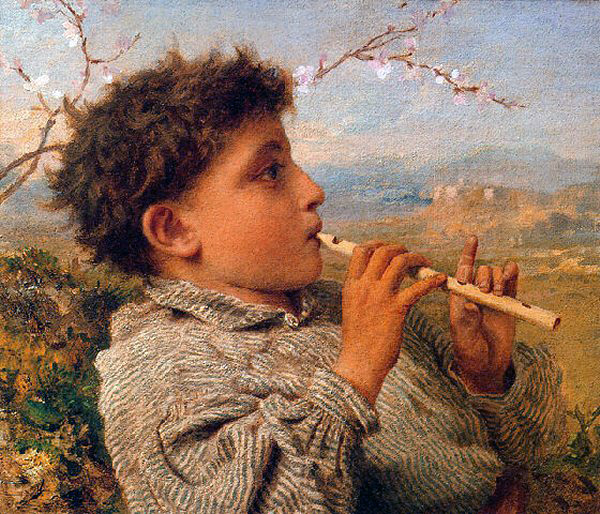
A boy playing a traditional pipe.

The Pipers' Guild of Great Britain is an organisation founded in the United Kingdom in the first half of the 20th century. Members make their own bamboo pipes, similar to tin whistles, and form local ensembles to play these pipes. Margaret James began making these based on a traditional goatherd's pipe in the 1920s and founded the organisation in 1931.

== See also ==
- Pipe (instrument)
