= Fujara =

Large Slovak shepherd's flute

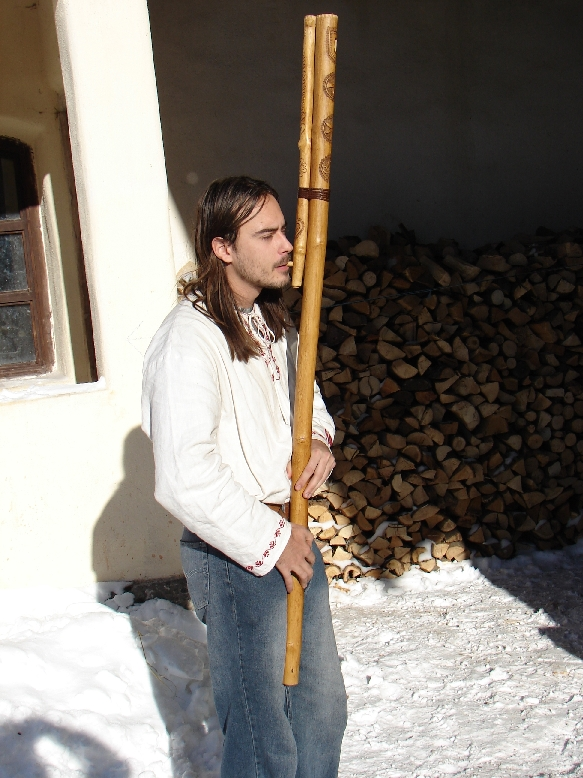

Woodwind instrument
- Classification: Aerophone

Related instruments
- Koncovka; Tabor pipe; Recorder; Willow flute; Kalyuka

Fujara and its music
- UNESCO Intangible Cultural Heritage
- Country: Slovakia
- Reference: 00099
- Region: Europe and North America

Inscription history
- Inscription: 2008 (3rd session)
- List: Representative

The fujara (Slovak pronunciation: [ˈfujara]) is a large wind instrument of the tabor pipe class. It originated in central Slovakia as a sophisticated folk shepherd's overtone fipple flute of unique design in the contrabass range.

Ranging from 160 to 200 cm long (5'3" – 6'6") and tuned in A, G, or F. It has three tone holes (also called finger holes) located on the lower part of the main body. The sound is produced by a fipple at the upper end of the main body of the fujara. The air is led to the fipple through a smaller parallel pipe, called vzduchovod in Slovak (meaning "air channel"), mounted on the main body of the instrument. While it is possible to play the fundamental frequency on fujaras, the normal playing technique is based on overblowing the instrument. Because of the high aspect ratio of the sound chamber (great length versus small internal diameter), the player can use overtones to play a diatonic scale using only the three tone holes. The fujara is typically played while standing, with the instrument held vertically and usually braced against the right thigh.

== Technique and role ==
Slovak musician and instrument maker Ľubomír Párička plays the fujara

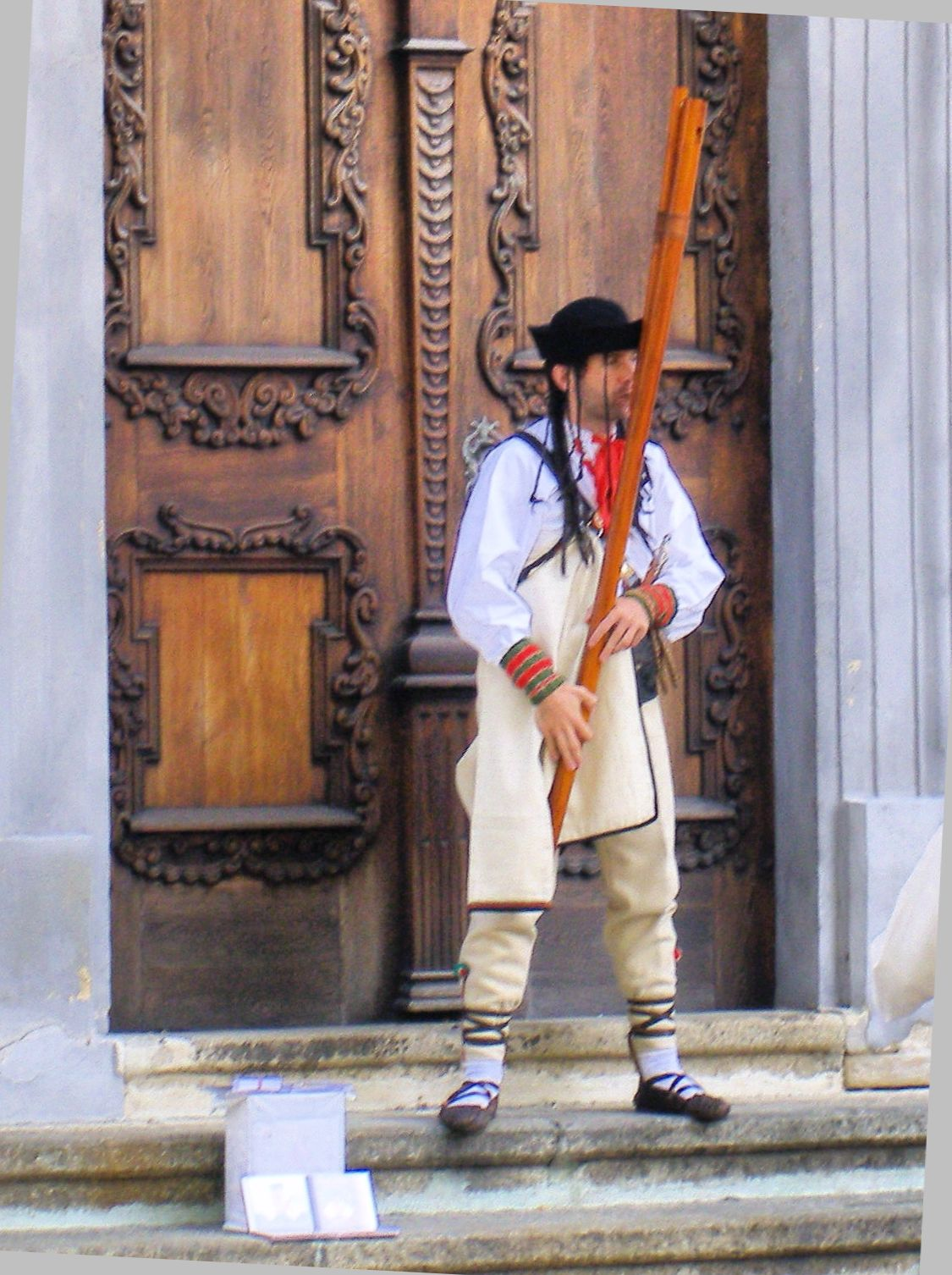
A fujara player.

The atypical design produces a deep, meditative timbre. Ornaments are traditionally added to the base melodies, which usually occur in the Mixolydian mode. Two common types of ornaments are prefuk, the rapid overblowing of a single note (from Slovak prefukovať 'to overblow'), and rozfuk, a descending cascade of overtones (from Slovak rozfúkať 'to scatter by blowing').

Traditionally, the fujara was played by shepherds for recreation. Today, the fujara has moved from the shepherds' fields to the stage of folk festivals in the Slovak towns of Východná and Detva. The instrument has also left Slovakia and is played all over the world; particularly by aficionados of native flutes in western Europe and North America. Despite this, the fujara has yet to gain popularity or much recognition outside of Slovakia. Most often the fujara is a solo instrument, but ensembles of two or three fujaras have been known, such as the Kubinec family or the Javorová Húžva trio.

The fujara was added to the UNESCO list of Masterpieces of the Oral and Intangible Heritage of Humanity in 2005. "The Fujara and its Music" was added to the Representative List of the Intangible Cultural Heritage of Humanity in 2008 by UNESCO.

== See also ==
- Koncovka another Slovak overtone flute with a fipple and no side toneholes
- Tabor pipe other 3-hole folk flutes
- Willow flute another overtone based folk flute with a side blown fipple and no side toneholes
- Kalyuka, Russian overtone flute with an end-blown open tube with no side toneholes
