= Flageolet =

Woodwind musical instrument

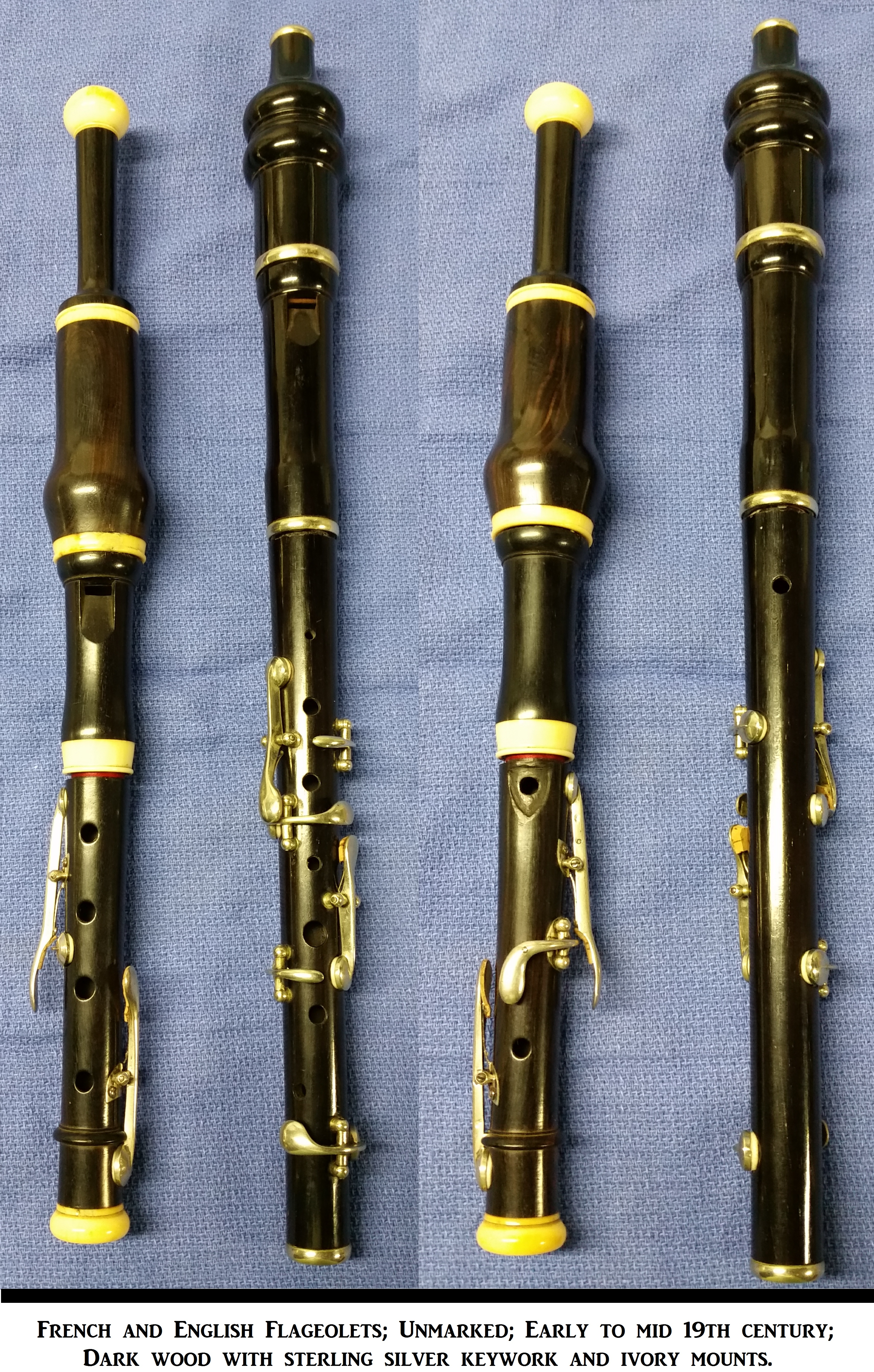

Woodwind instrument
- Classification: Woodwind; wind; aerophone
- Hornbostel–Sachs classification: 421.222.12 (Open flute with internal duct and fingerholes)
- Developed: 1600s

Playing range
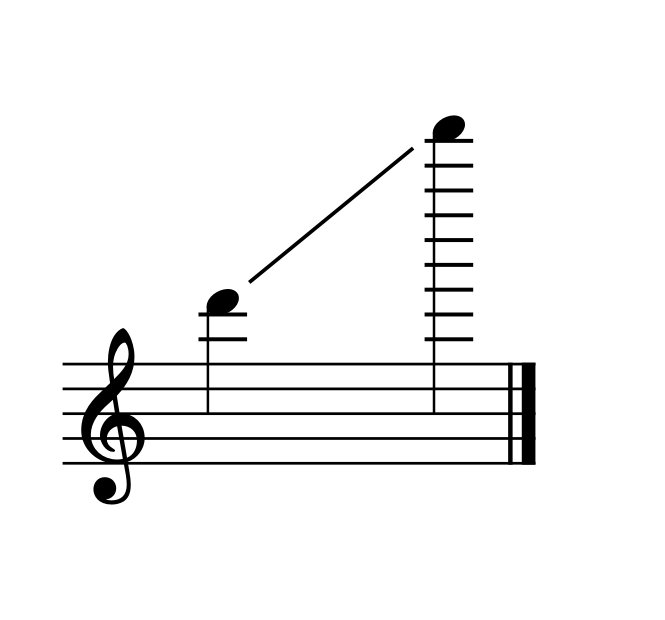

Related instruments
- Simple-system flute; Pipe and tabor; Shvi; Tin whistle

The flageolet is a woodwind instrument and a member of the family of duct flutes that includes recorders and tin whistles. There are two basic forms of the instrument: the French, having four finger holes on the front and two thumb holes on the back; and the English, having six finger holes on the front, and sometimes a single thumb hole on the back. The latter was developed by English instrument maker William Bainbridge, resulting in the "improved English flageolet" in 1803. There are also double and triple flageolets, having two or three bodies that allowed for a drone and counter-melody. Flageolets were made until the 19th century.

== Etymology ==
Flageolet means "little flute". The name is the diminutive form of the Old French word flajol (flute). In Provençal dialect, flute is flaujol or flautol.

== History ==
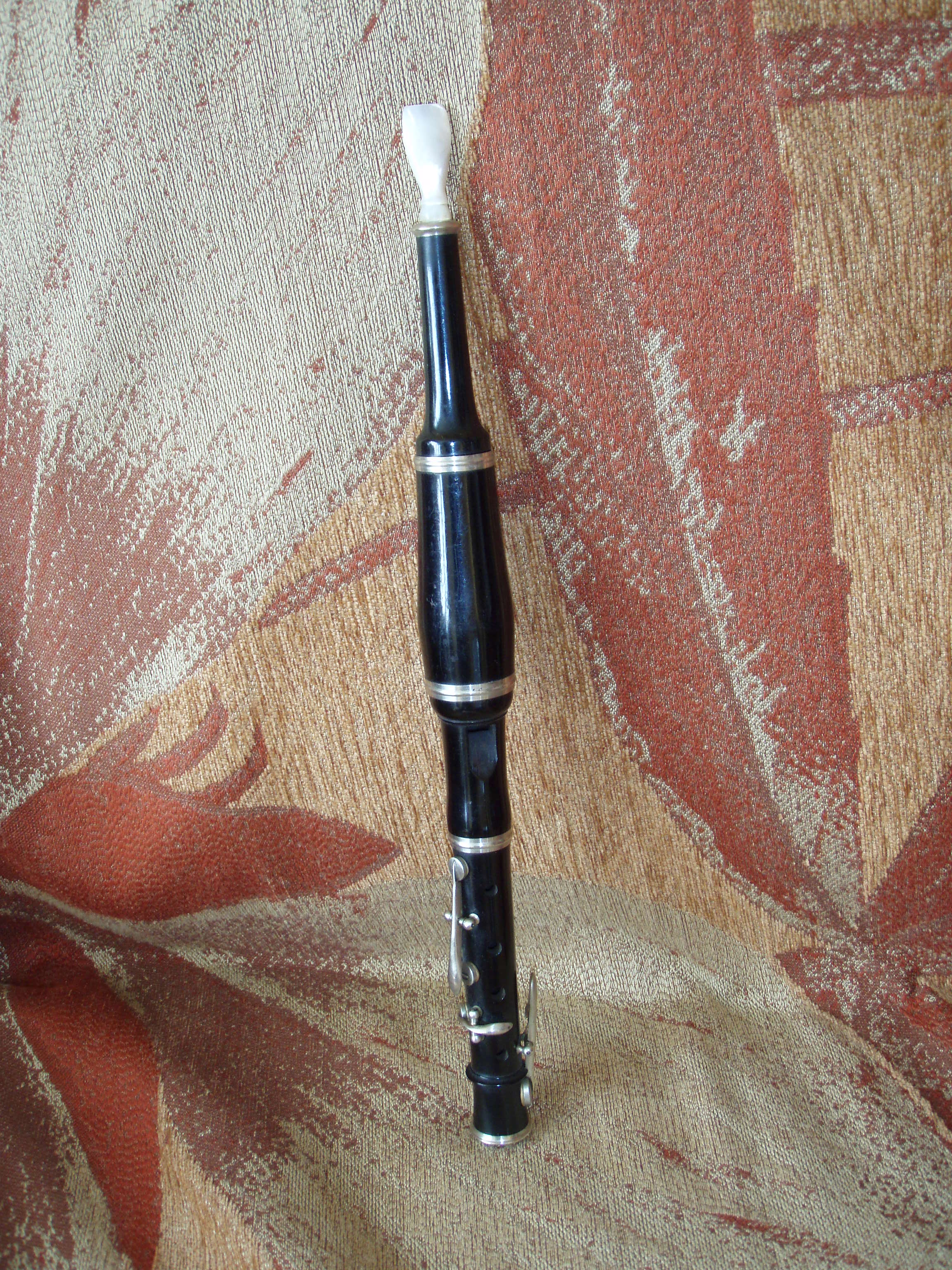
French flageolet

Flageolets have varied greatly during the past 400 years. The first flageolets were called "French flageolets"; these had four tone holes on the front and two tone holes on the back. An early collection of the manuscript Lessons for the Flajolet, dating c. 1676, is preserved in the British Library. Small versions of this instrument, called bird flageolets, were also made and were used for teaching birds to sing. These tiny flageolets have, like the French flageolet, four finger holes on the front and two thumb holes on the back. The invention of the flageolet is often attributed to the 16th-century Sieur Juvigny in 1581, although it is possible that Juvigny had refined an earlier design, or was simply a flageolet player.

The number of keys on French flageolets ranges from none to seven, with exception of the Boehm system French flageolet made by Buffet Crampon, which had eight keys and five rings. The arrangement of the tone holes on the flageolet yields a scale different from that on the whistle or recorder. The flageolet's basic scale is D-E-F-G-A-B-C-d. Cross-fingerings and keys are required to play a major scale.

=== English ===
In the late 18th and early 19th centuries, certain English instrument makers, most notably William Bainbridge, began making flageolets with six finger holes on the front. These instruments are called "English flageolets" and were eventually produced in metal as tin whistles. The keys number between none and six. Some were produced with changeable top joints which allowed the flageolet to be played as a flute or fife.

=== Double ===
Double flageolet made by Rudall, Carte & Co., England, c. 1852–1854

In 1805, William Bainbridge made a double flageolet out of one piece of wood. In December 1805, his rival, Thomas Scott, was granted a patent for "an instrument on the flageolette principle, so constructed as a single instrument that two parts of a musical composition can be played thereon at the same time by one person". With the blind organist John Purkis, the Scott & Purkis partnership was formed to manufacture these new instruments, and a tutorial book was published. Bainbridge patented a traverse flageolet in 1807 and a double flute-flageolet in 1819. In the 1820s, he created a triple flageolet. The third pipe relies on the thumb to finger, in an ocarina pattern.

== Design ==
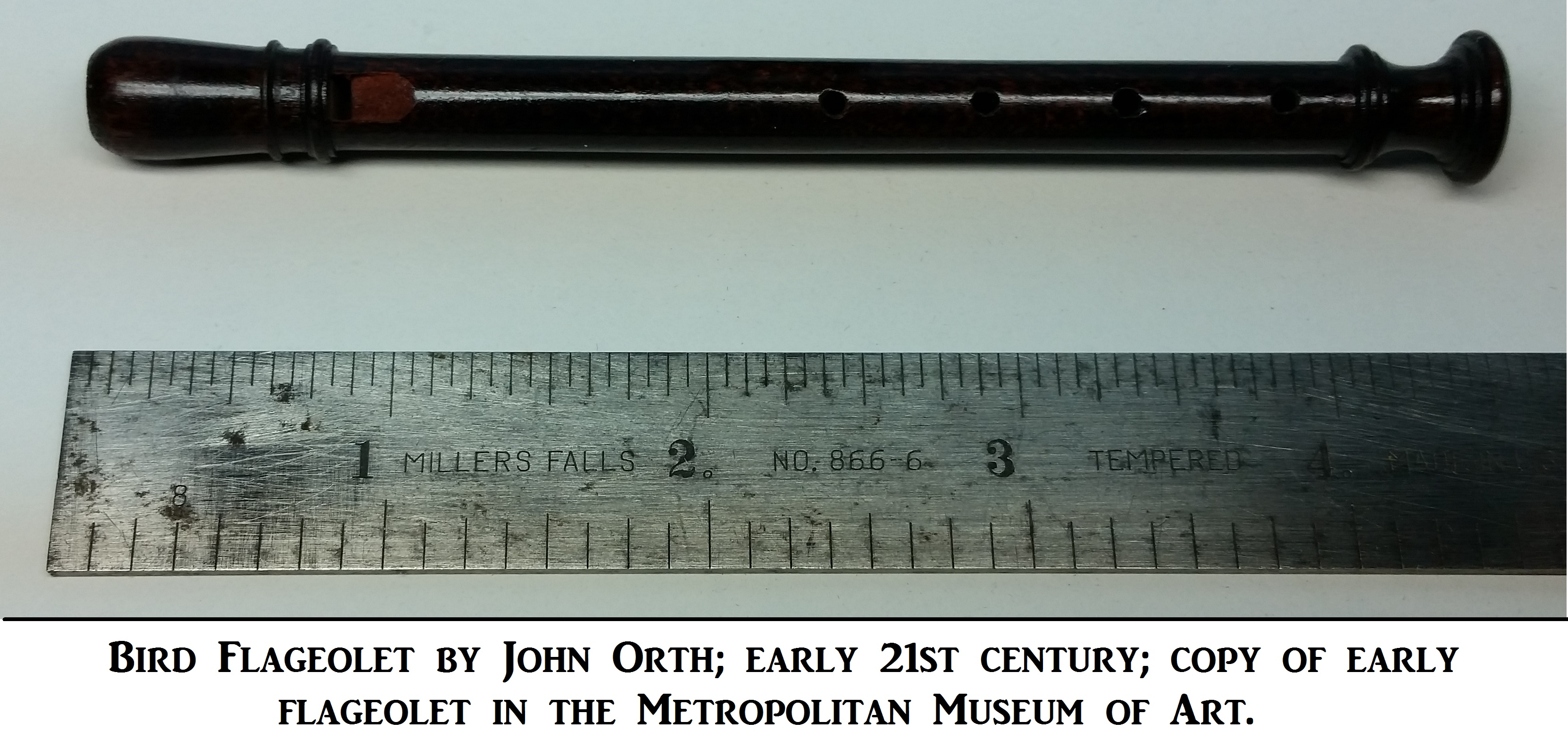
Bird flageolet

The mouthpiece of the initial French design resembled that of a recorder. A later design placed an elongated windcap around the entrance to the duct and became the standard for the English instrument. The mouthpiece was a flat bit of ivory or bone. The chamber inside the windcap was intended to collect moisture and prevent it from entering the duct, employing differing devices for that purpose.

The stream of air passing through the duct crosses the window and is split by the labium (also lip or edge) giving rise to a musical sound. The body (or bodies, in a double or triple flageolet) contains the finger holes and keys. The windcap is not essential to the sound production and the instrument can be played by blowing directly into the duct as in the initial recorder-type design.

The flageolet was eventually entirely replaced by the tin whistle and is rarely played today. However, it is a very easy instrument to play and the timbre is soft and gentle. It has a range of around two octaves.

== Usage ==
Hector Berlioz, Frédéric Chalon, Samuel Pepys and Robert Louis Stevenson all played the flageolet. Henry Purcell and George Frideric Handel composed for it. Some of Wolfgang Amadeus Mozart's piccolo parts were originally played on flageolet.

== Other uses ==
The instrument's soft, high timbre gave rise to the usage of "flageolet" as a term for harmonics in other instruments, particularly strings and the flute. The German term for string harmonics is Flageolet/Flageolettöne. Soft flute harmonics are sometimes referred to as "flageolet tone". In the second part of The Rite of Spring, Igor Stravinsky marks an extended flute passage "Flag.", which requires the three players to use harmonics.

In the 16th century, French organs began to use a 1′ pipe labeled "flageolet". It became a less common organ stop in the late 17th century. In American organs, flageolet stops are often 2′.

== See also ==
- Three-hole pipe
- Shvi
