= Fipple =

Musical instrument

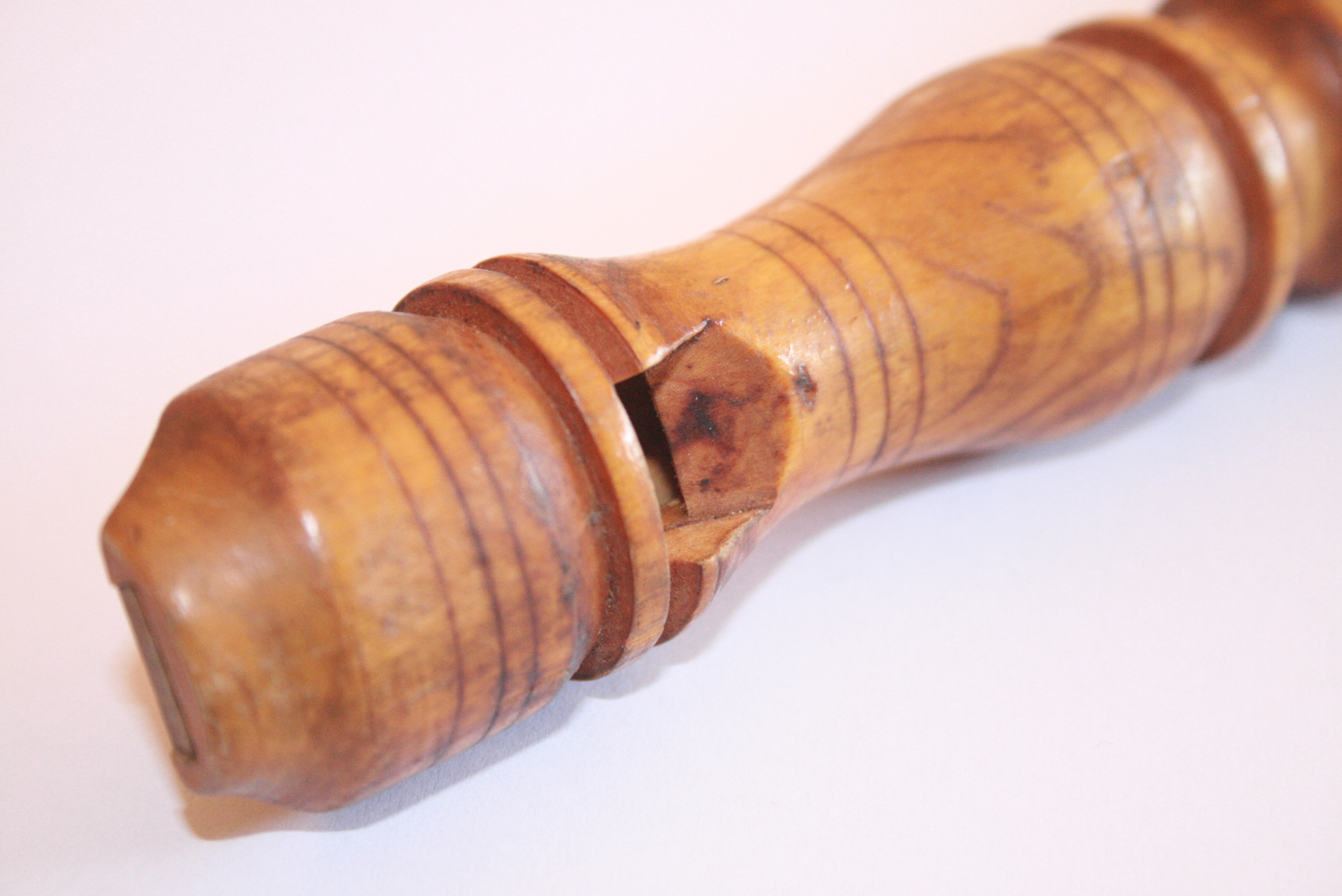
Mouthpiece of a Catalan recorder

The term fipple specifies a variety of end-blown flute that includes the flageolet, recorder, and tin whistle. The Hornbostel–Sachs system for classifying musical instruments places this group under the heading "Flutes with duct or duct flutes." The label "fipple flute" is frequently applied to members of the subgroup but there is no general agreement about the structural detail of the sound-producing mechanism that constitutes the fipple itself.

== Nomenclature ==
Cross-section of the mouthpiece of a recorder, indicating a block (A), duct (B), and edge (C)

The accompanying illustration of the mouthpiece of a recorder shows a wooden block (A) with a channel carved into the body of the instrument (B), together forming a duct that directs a ribbon of air across an opening toward a sharp edge (C). The edge splits the air in a manner that alternately directs it into and outside of the tube, setting the contained column of air into periodic vibration. This flow-controlled "air reed" is a definitive characteristic of all flutes, which therefore all have an edge or equivalent air-splitting device.

There are several ways in which a duct can be formed. These include the player's lips controlling the stream of air as it is directed to the edge, without mechanical assistance. Common examples of this are the end-blown ney and the side-blown concert flute. The first attested use of the term fipple is in a comparison between the recorder and the transverse flute by Francis Bacon, published in 1626.

Recorders…were it not for the fipple, that straitneth the air…would yeeld no sound. … Some kinds of winde-instruments, are blowne at a small hole in the side, which straitneth the breath at the first entrance, the rather in respect of their traverse, and stop above the hole, which performeth the fipples part, as is seene in flutes and fifes, which will not give a sound by a blast at the end, as recorders &c., doe.

By this description, the fipple is a plug that nearly closes one end of the pipe, open only for the duct that "straitens” (that is, constrains) the channel of air blown axially into the instrument. The solid "stop" near the mouth hole or embouchure on a pipe that is blown transversely is analogous to it. This provides historical justification for using the term "fipple flute" to designate a recorder (cf. the German term Blockflöte). Subsequent authors have used the term in that sense but differ in the element of the mechanical aggregate illustrated above that they regard specifically as the fipple. That word is used variously to designate the block, the edge, the full block-duct-edge structure, and the entire instrument. This ambiguity is detailed in the article headed Fipple in Grove Music Online, which concludes, "Since nobody can agree what the term means, to avoid further confusion its use should be abandoned." In the text below, what might otherwise be termed a fipple flute is referred to as a duct flute.

== Sound production ==
A whistle sound is produced by the interaction between the air reed and the air column in the segment of the instrument that projects just beyond the edge. The dimensions of the entire body of the instrument determine its timbre and pitch. Various additional structural details permit the player to alter both these factors. One example of this is the set of finger holes that laterally pierce the body of a recorder and are opened or closed to change the length of the vibrating air column.

The recorder can be used to illustrate further nuance in the design of duct flutes. By definition, the duct is formed by a channel carved into the body of the instrument, and the block. This passage is alternately termed a windway and ends at an opening referred to as a window, bounded by the edge on the opposite side. This rigid structure affords intrinsically less dynamic and intonational flexibility than does, for example, a transverse flute embouchure. This can be offset by other structural details. In the case of the recorder, their presence or absence often differentiates between mass-produced and artisan-built instruments. In a broader context, the difference between one type of duct flute and another is determined both by gross and finer structural detail.

== History ==
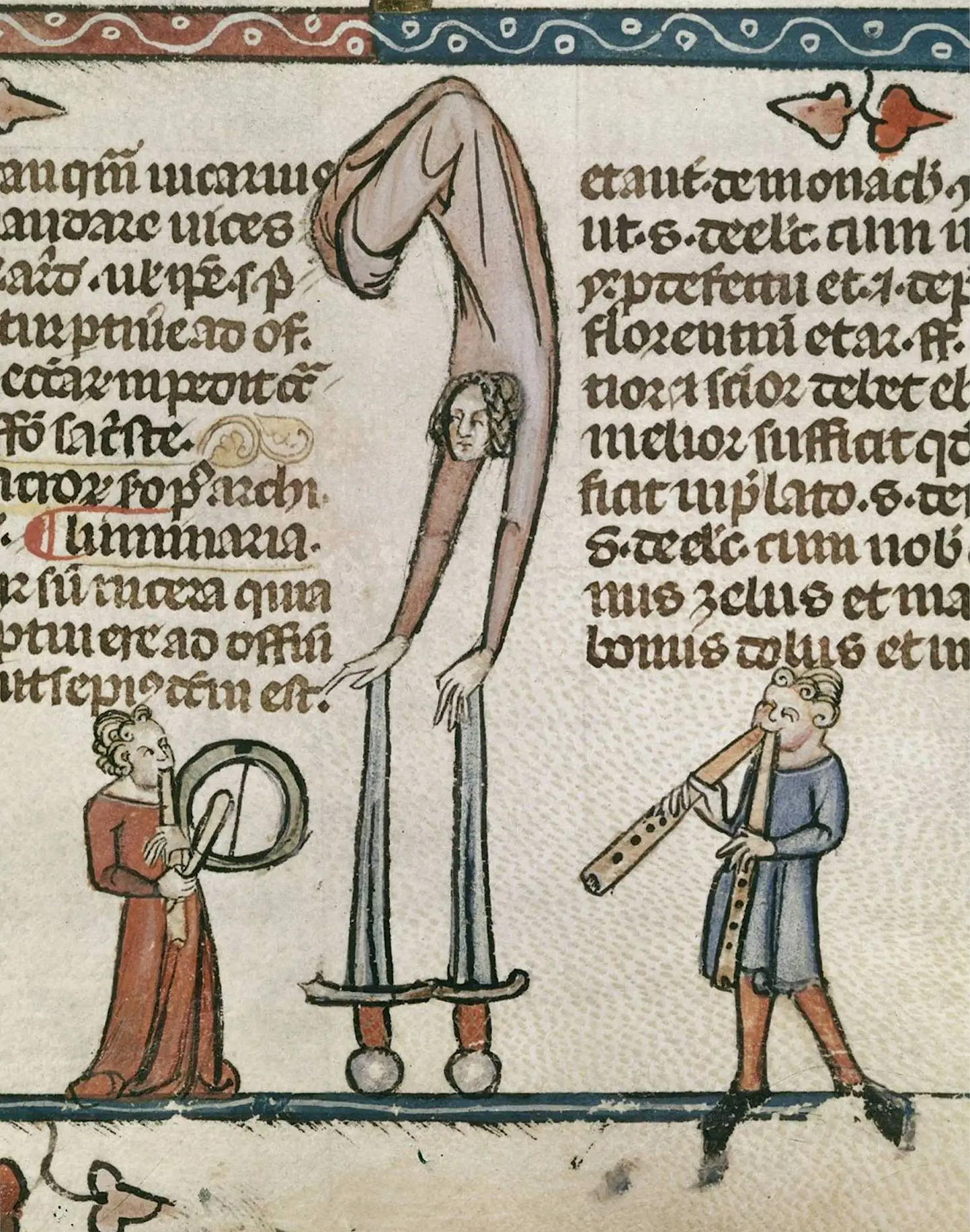
A pipe and tabor player and a double pipe player accompany a gymnast in this Medieval illustration.

Duct flutes have a long history: the Seaty Hill Malham Moor West Yorkshire flute originally was dated in 1952 to the Iron Age; it is made from a sheep bone and can be found in Leeds City Museum. However more recent work suggests it to be an artefact of the post-Roman era. The museum on the Isle of Bute has a definitively established Iron Age flute.

Possibly the oldest discovered fipple instrument is the Wicklow Pipes. Although the instrument found was incomplete, a replica set was playable when fitted with fipples.

L.E. McCullough notes that the oldest surviving whistles date from the 12th century, but that, "Players of the feadan are also mentioned in the description of the King of Ireland's court found in Early Irish law dating from the 7th and 8th centuries A.D."

The Tusculum whistle is a 14-cm whistle with six finger holes, made of brass or bronze, found with pottery dating to the 14th and 15th centuries; it is currently in the collections of the National Museums Scotland.

One of the earliest surviving recorders was discovered in a castle moat in Dordrecht, the Netherlands in 1940, and has been dated to the 14th century. It is largely intact, though not playable. A second more or less intact 14th century recorder was found in a latrine in northern Germany (in Göttingen): other 14th-century examples survive from Esslingen (Germany) and Tartu (Estonia). There is a fragment of a possible 14th-15th-century bone recorder in Rhodes (Greece); and there is an intact 15th-century example from Elblag (Poland).

== Duct flutes ==
The following flutes have a duct structure:

- Bangsi Alas
- Diple (or dvojnice)
- Flabiol
- Flageolet (forerunner of the tin whistle)
- Fujara
- Hydraulophone
- Khloy
- Khlui
- Kuisi
- Several Indigenous American flutes, including the double chamber instrument commonly known as the Native American Flute, the latter usually have an edge slanted toward the inside of the instrument, and a primary air chamber before the constricted air canal or windway, created with a separate mobile piece tied to the instrument's body, an external block, making a roof instead of a floor for the windway.
- Ocarinas, and among them the Gemshorn
- Flue pipes of the pipe organ
- Pipe (as with tabor)
- Recorder
- Salamuri
- Shvi
- Slide whistle (aka swanee or swannee whistle, piston flute, jazz flute)
- Sopilka, Ukrainian folk instruments with several variants, including twin-piped instruments (superficially resembling the aulos) and modern "chromatic" instruments with 10 holes
- Souravli
- Spilåpipa
- Stabule
- Telenka, Ukrainian overtone flute
- Tin whistle (or penny whistle)
- Txistu
- Frula

== See also ==
- Wind instrument for additional information on sound production
