= List of European folk music traditions =

This is a list of folk music traditions, with styles, dances, instruments and other related topics. The term folk music can not be easily defined in a precise manner; it is used with widely varying definitions depending on the author, intended audience and context within a work. Similarly, the term traditions in this context does not connote any strictly defined criteria. Music scholars, journalists, audiences, record industry individuals, politicians, nationalists and demagogues may often have occasion to address which fields of folk music are to a distinct group of people and with characteristics undiluted by contact with the music of other peoples; thus, the folk music traditions described herein overlap in varying degrees with each other. Sometimes, folk songs will often be passed down.

== Europe ==
Country	Elements	Dance	Instrumentation	Other topics
Albanian "Jozin z bazin"	aheng; Albanian ballad; epic (këngë trimash, këngë kreshnikësh); kaba; kantadha; Kefalonitika; këputje fjalësh; Korçare; lament; llazore; lullaby; maje krahi; Albanian iso-polyphony; prcjellsi; rapsodi; saze orchestra; serenata; Albanian wedding music; work song	ajsino oro; arnaöut; Osman Taka; pušteno; sherianqe; shota; valle	bousouk / buzuk; cifteli; clarinet; dajreja; def; fyell; grrneta; lahuta; llautë; lodra; mandolin; sharki; violin; zumarë	kurbet; pare
Andalusian	See Spanish	–	–	–
Andorran	See Catalan	–	–	–
Arbereshi	See Albanian	–	–	–
Austrian	Faschingsbriefe; Schnadahüpfl (Gstanzl, Gsetzl, Trutzgsangl); schrammelmusik; string quartet; Wienalied; yodeling (Jodler, Wullaza, Hullaza, Almer); Zettellandler	Volkstanz: Blasmusik; Boarischer; Eiswalzer; Hiatamadl; Jägermarsch; Kontratänze; Krebspolka; Kreuzpolka; Kuckuckspolka; ländler; Lunzer Boarischer; mazurka; Neudeutscher; polka; Poschater Zwoaschritt; Rediwa (Sprachinseltänze); Schnitterhüpfer; schuhplattler (Plattler); Rheinländer; Siebenschritt; Steirischer; Studentenpolka; Zwiefacher; waltz	almpfeiferl; accordion; alphorn; clarinet; double bass (contrabass); dulcimer; fiddle; flute; grazer; guimbard (jaw harp); guitar; harp; Styrian harmonica; tamburica; trumpet; violin; zither	heurigen; tracht; Volkssänger
Auvergnat	See French	–	–	–
Balearic Islander	See Catalan	–	–	–
Basque	Bertsolaritza; Ttakuna; Choir; Herrena; Trikitixa	Abaltzisketa; Arin-arin; Aurresku; Azeri; Baso; Basauri; Beti Alai Arku; Brokel; Ezpata; Eztai-soinu; Fandangoa; Garai; Gizon; Ingurutxo; Jorrai; Kalejira; Karrika Soinu (biribilketa); Larrain; Legazpi; Makil; Matelota; Miel Otxin; Mutil; Muxiko (Mutico); Paloteados; Sagar; San Juan; Soka; Sorgin; Trokel; Uztai Txiki; Yantza Luze; Zortziko	Alboka (double clarinet); Atabal; Dulzaina; Kirikoketa; Pandero; Silbote; Tarogato; Tobera; Trikitixa (concertina); Ttunttun (drum); Txalaparta; Txistu (three hole pipe); Xirula (flute); barrel organ))	Aintzara-joku; Alarde; Basque picnic; Maskarada (carnival of Soule); Pastoral
Bavarian	See German	–	–	–
Belarusian				
Bohemian	See Czech	–	–	–
Bosnian	gange; gusle; ilahije; izvorna bosanska muzika; Ladino song; novokomponovana narodna muzika; ravne pjesme; sevdalinka (sevdah)	line dance; kolo	accordion; bagpipe; clarinet; daire; double bass; flute; guitar; sargija (lute); snare drum; violin	
Breton	bagad (bagadoù, pipe band); chant de marin (sea shanty); couples de sonneurs (sonner par couple); gwerz (gwerzioù); kan a boz; kan ha diskan; kantik (hymn); kost ar c'hoat; quête; sôn (sonioù)	an dros (an dro); bals; plinn; fisel; gavotte; jabadao; hanter dro; laridé (ridée); pach-pi; rond	accordion; binou (bagpipe, kozh, braz, bihan, pib veur); binou braz; bombarde (oboe); hurdy-gurdy; telenn (harp); treujenn-gaol (clarinet, trognon d'chou); veuze (bagpipe); violon (violin, fiddle)	chanteurs engagés (protest singer); Dastum; diskaner; fest-noz (festou noz, bal breton); kaner; roots revival; sonerion
Bulgarian	choir; Koleduvane; kopanica; Laduvane; Lazaruvane; na trapeza; wedding music	Horo: acano mlada nvesto (line dance); buchimish (line dance); chetvorno; chope; daichovo (line dance); dunavsko; elenino (line dance); eleno mome; iove male mome; kopanica; kopanitsa (line dance, gankino); nestinari; paidushko; petrunino; povarnato (devetorka); pravo horo (line dance); rachenitsa (ruchenitsa, couple dance); sandansko; sedenka; sedi donka; trite puti (line dance); tropoli	clarinet; kaba gaida; kaval (flute); gadulka; gaida (bagpipe); tambura (lute); tarabuka (drum); tǔpan (drum)	Koprivshtitsa
Burgenland Croat	See Croatian	–	–	–
Calabrian	See Italian	–	–	–
Cantabrian	tonada montañesa; marzas; cantares de ronda; pasacalles; romances; coplas a lo pesau; coplas a lo ligeru; cantos de labor; trova; reyes; canto a bodas; villancico	jota montañesa; picayos; danza de arcos; baila de Ibio; paloteo; pericote lebaniego; trepeletré; cuevanuco; romance del conde de Lara; danza de cintas	pitu montañés; gaita; rabel; bígaru; tamboril; chifla campurriana; caja redoblante; pandereta; pandero; tarrañuelas; vozaina; silbu; albogue; rutón sobano; chiflita pasiega; alcurdión; cuerno pasiego	[jisquíu]] o ijujú
Castilian	See Spanish	–	–	–
Catalan	ball de bastons; ball de gitanes; besones; caramelles; cercaviles; colla; colles diableres; cobla; galops; gloses (glosada, estribot); gotxos; habanera; ida y vuelta; lullaby; passos; porfèdia; redoblada; regateix; redoblat; uc; work song	bolero; contrapàs; copeo; cossiers; habaneres; jota; marratxa; mateixa; sa filera; Saint Anne's dance; sardana (circle dance); sardana curta; sardana llarga; sardana de lluïment; sardana revessa; ses dotze rodades; ses nou rodades	bandurria; bimbau (jaw harp); castanet; fiscorn (horn); flabiol (flute); gralla (oboe); guitarró (guitar); sac de gemecs (bagpipe, coixinera, caterineta, borrega, manxa borrega, bot, noia verda, mossa verda, ploranera, sac de les aspres, buna, cornamusa); tambori; tambourine; tarota (oboe); tenora (shawm); tible; xeremia (clarinet); ximbomba	cantada
Cham	See Albanian	–	–	–
Channel Islands	bachîn ringing	bérouisse; cotillion; danse des chapieaux (the hat dance); ronde (round dance); sonneur	accordion; bachîn; chifournie (hurdy gurdy); violin	
Cornish	Cornish carol	cushion dance; jig; hornpipe; reel; troyll	bagpipe; bombarde; crowdy crawn (croder croghen); fiddle (crowd); hand drum; harp	gorsedd
Corsican	See French	–	–	–
Croatian	bećarac; deseterac; epic poetry; klapa; tamburica band; tamburitza	drme; kolo (round dance); lindjo; moreška (Korčula sword dance); zvecke	accordion; berda; bisernice; brač; bugarija; clarinet; curla; diple; fiddle; gange; gusle; lijerica (lirica, fiddle); roznica; samica; sargija (dulcimer); sopila; tambura (mandolin); tamburica; violin; zither	Istrian scale; kukeri
Cypriot	See Greek or Turkish	–	–	–
Czech	Národní písni: cimbalom band; gajdošská (bagpipe band); hudecká (fiddle band); lidovka (lidovky); skřipácká; old Prague song (staropražské písničky); tramp music (trampská hudba)	polka; sedlácká; táhlá; verbunk (Slovácko verbuňk)	accordion; bagpipe; cimbalom; clarinet; double bass; fiddle; viola; violin	
Dalmatian	See Croatian	–	–	–
Danish		fanik	accordion	
Dutch		mâtelot; mazurka; polka; Seven Sault; waltz	accordion; doedelzak; guitar; hurdy-gurdy; pijpzak; violin	
Emilian	See Italian	–	–	–
English	broadside ballad; Child ballad; wassailing	clogging; country dance; horn dance; hornpipe; long sword; Maypole dance; morris dance; rapper dance	melodeon; concertina; fiddle; mouth organ; Northumbrian smallpipe; trombone; tuba; snare drum; bass drum	
Estonian	runo-song; swing-song	reilender; labajalg; polka	accordion; bagpipe; concertina; fiddle; kannel; talharpa (hiiu kannel); trumpet; whistle; zither	Kalevipoeg
Faroese	kingosalmar; kvæði; skjaldur; tættir; visur	circle dance; Faroe two-step		
Finnish	itku; rekilaulu; runolaulu	humppa; jenkka; mazurka; minuet; pelimanni; polka; purpuri; schottische; waltz	accordion; clarinet; fiddle; harmonium; horn; jouhikko; kantele; talharpa; whistle	Kalevala
Flemish				
Florentine	See Italian	–	–	–
Formentera	See Catalan	–	–	–
Frisian		galop; polka; skoetsploech; skots; walz	accordion; fiddle; melodeon; rommelpot	
French	bal-musette; Corsican polyphonic song; paghjella; regret	bacchu-ber; bourrée; branle; contredanse; farandole; quadrille; rigaudon	aboè; accordion; bodega; boha; cabrette; chabrette; cornemuse; fifre; galoubet; graille; grand cornemuse; hurdy-gurdy; pifre; tambourin; violin	
Galician	coplas verdes; alalá; alborada; pasacalles; carballesa; ribeirana	danza de damas e galáns; jota; muiñeira; pasodobre; rumba	accordion; cadro; clarinet; gaita; pandeireta; pandeiro; tamboril; tarrañolas	
Gascon	See French	–	–	–
Genoese	See Italian	–	–	–
German	anacrusis; German ballad; volksmusik; volkslied; yodeling	perchtentanz; schuhplatteltanz; waltz	alphorn; zupfgeige	Kriegspiele; Stadtfeste
Gheg	See Albanian	–	–	–
Greek	amané; dhimotika tragoudhia; kalanda; kantadhes; kleftiko; Klephtic song; miroloyia; nisiotika; rebetiko; skaros; taxim; tis tavlas	çiftetelli; hasaposerviko; kalamatiano; karsilama; khasapiko; syrto; tsamiko; zeibekiko	askomandura; baglamas; bouzouki; daouli; defi; gaida; kavali; kithara; klarino; laouto / laoutokithara (lute guitar); lyra; outi; santouri; toumberleki; tsambouna; violi; zournas	dhimotiki; dromoi; manges; paniyiria; rebetes; tekes
Gypsy	See Romani (Gypsy)	–	–	–
Hungarian	hajnali; parlando-rubato; tempo-giusto; verbunkos	csárdás; legényes; szóló; verbunkos	bagpipe; cimbalom; cowbell; fiddle; gardon; hurdy-gurdy; violin; zither	táncház
Ibiza	See Catalan	–	–	–
Icelandic	organum; rimur	Icelandic ballad dancing	fidla; langspil	saga
Irish	aisling; amhrain; ballad; bard; caoineadh; diddling; drinking song; Fonn Mall; harp music; keening (lament, caoning); macaronic song; Ossian ballad (Fenian ballad); rebel song; reverdie; sean nós	carol; céilidh; clogging; highland; hornpipe; jig; polka; quadrille; reel; slide; slip jig; step dance; strathspey	accordion; banjo; bodhrán; bouzouki; concertina; fiddle; flute; guitar; harp; uilleann pipes; whistle	American wake conyach; crack; feis; fleadh; session
Istrian	See Croatian	–	–	–
Italian	baride; endecasillabo; gozo; maggio; Sardinian polyphony; tammorriata; trallalero; villanella	ciociora; forlana; ruggera; saltarello; siciliana; su ballu; tarantella; trescona	accordion; clapper; clarinet; flute; guitar; jaw harp; launedda; lira; mandolin; melodeon; ocarina; organetto; panpipe; piffero; rattle; tamburello; tamorra; tamura; violin; zampogna	tarantolati
Karelian	See Finnish	–	–	–
Kvarnerian	See Croatian	–	–	–
Lab	See Albanian	–	–	–
Latvian	balss; daina; dziesma; līgotnes; runo-song; sadzīves; ziņģe	polka; quadrille; rotaļa; dancis; žepers; līkumdeja; sudmaliņas; dvieļudeja; skaludancis	accordion; birch trumpet; citara; dūdas; fiddle; ganurags; ģīga; kokles; mandolin; stabule; trideksnis; ieviņas; bubins	Lāčplēsis; Dainu skapis
Lithuanian	daina; dvejines; keturines; sutartines; trejines	polka; quadrille; rateliai; waltz	accordion; balalaika; bandoneón; basetle; birbynes; clarinet; concertina; daudytes; fiddle; guitar; harmonica; kankle; lamzdeliai; mandolin; pusline; ragai; sekminiu ragelis; skuduciai; svilpas; tabala	
Lombard	See Italian	–	–	–
Majorca	See Catalan	–	–	–
Manx	Carvalyn Gailckagh; lament; Manx carol			
Macedonian	calgia; narodni orkestri		accordion; cemane; clarinet; def; dzumbus; gajda; kanun; kaval; supelka; tambura; tarabuka; tupan; ut; zurla	narodna muzika; nove narodne pesme novokomponirana
Maltese	għana		Maltese guitar; Żaqq; Ir-rabbaba or iz-zafzafa	
Menorca	See Catalan	–	–	–
Moldovan	See Romanian	–	–	–
Montenegrin	Montenegrin epic poetry		gusle	
Moravian	See Czech	–	–	–
Neapolitan	See Italian	–	–	–
Norwegian	bånsuller; kveding; halling; laling; lokking; Norwegian ballad; slåttar; stev; tralling	bruremarsj; bygdedans; gammeldans; gangar; halling; pols; rull; springar; springdans; springleik	bukkehorn; fiddle; Hardanger fiddle; harp; langeleik; lur; Meråker clarinet; seljefløyte; trekkspel; tungehorn	kappleikar
Occitan	See French	–	–	–
Piedmontese	See Italian	–	–	–
Pityusan Islander	See Catalan	–	–	–
Polish		chodzony; cimbaŀy; krakowiak; krzesany; mazurka; obertas; ozwodna; polka; polonaise; zbojnicki	cello; diable skrzypce; fiddle; gensle; kozioł; maryna; mazanka; suka; violin	dozynki
Pontic Greek	folk; acritic; call and response; parakathi	Pontic Greek folk dance; serra; dipat; atsiapat; omal	lyra; daouli; touloum; zourna; kemane; oud	{{{Other}}}
Portugal	castiço; fado; modinha; Romanceiro; tamborileiro; zés-pereiras	dança dos homens; fofa; lundum	adufe; bandolim; bexigoncelo; bombo; brinquinho; caixa; cântaro com abanho; castanholas; cavaquinho; concertina; concha; ferrinhos; flauta pastoril; gaita-de-foles; genebres; guitarra; pandeireta; pandeiro; pifaro; reco-reco; sanfona; sarronça; tamboril; transcanholas; viola; zaclitracs	fadista; ranchos folclóricos; saudade
Provenç	See French	–	–	–
Puglian	See Italian	–	–	–
Romani (Gypsy)	bulerías; calgia; cantes; cimbalom; fandango; fasil; flamenco; jaleo; koumpaneia; loki djili; oral-bassing; siguiriyas; soleares; taksim; tientos; tangos	alegrias; belly dance; bulerías; farruca; garrotin; marianas; moritas; khelimaske djili	accordion; buzuq; cimbalom; clarinet; cümbüş; darbuka; davul; djumbus; dombak; kaman; kanun; ney; rebab; tabla; ud; violin; zurna	braceos; cuadro; juerga; Karagöz shadow theatre; taraf
Romanian	ballad; colinde; doina; lament; taraf; Transylvanian wedding music	briu; fluier; geamparale; hora; sirba	cetera; cimbalom; cobza; doba; double bass; fiddle; nai; taragot; viola; violin; zongora	capra
Roussillon	See Catalan	–	–	–
Russian	bylina; chastushka; plach; protiazhnaia pesnia; wedding music		garmon; bayan; balalaika; domra; Russian guitar; tsimbl	
Sami	joik; lavlu		gievri; kobdas	noaite
Sardinian	See Italian	–	–	–
Scottish	ballad; Border ballad; bothy ballad; brosnachadh; cauld wind pipe; ceol beg; ceol mor; flyting; lilt; muckle sang; pibroch; piobaireachd; psalm; puirt-a-beul (mouth music); Scottish work song; Shetland fiddling; trowie; urlar; waulking song	battement; Highland fling; hornpipe; jig; minuet; quickstep; reel; shean treuse; strathspey; sword dance	accordion; Border pipe; clarsach; concertina; fiddle; flute; gue; harp; Highland pipes; Lowland pipe; pastoral pipe; pibroch; smallpipe; tin whistle	Cape Breton fiddling; Scottish Baroque music; conyach; Feisean; mod; tryst
Serbian	izvorna	cocek; kolo; sa-sa	frula; gaida; gusle; sargija; tamburitza; tupan; violin	
Sicilian	See Italian	–	–	–
Slavonian	See Croatian	–	–	–
Slovak		čardáš; čuchom; dupak; karicka; do kolesa; odzemok; polka; verbunk; waltz	accordion; cello; cimbal; dvojačka (double whistle); fujara; gajdy; koncovka(overtone flute); píšťalka (6 hole whistle); violin	
Slovenian	velike goslarije; Slovenian harmony singing		meh; panpipe; sopile; zither	
Spanish	copla; jaleo; jota; Romanceiro	aragonesas; bolero; bolerio viejo o parado; cachucha; chaconne; danza Antigua de Hermigua; Danza del Paloteo y el Cordón a La Virgen de La Piedad; Danza del Cordón, de la Carrera y del Paloteo al Cristo de la Viga; Danza de las ánimas; Danza de los Diablos; danzantes y pecados; S'a llarga y S'a curta; S'escandalari; fandango; gallega; Gitana; jota; jota de vendimia; malagueñas; manchegas; meloneras; milonga; mollaras; murciano; panaderos; quipuzcoanas; seguidilla; sevillana; soleares; torrás; valldemosa; vallenciana; verdiales; zambra; zarabanda	castanet; chacara (large castanet); bandurria; dulzaina; guitarra; mandolin; tambourine	café cantates; duende; juerga
Swedish	ballad; halling; kulning; laling; lockrop	cobbler's dance; daldans; gammaldans; gangar; kadrilj; pols; polska (polskor); rudl; runddans; skrålåt; springar; springdans; springleik; vafva vadna; vingåkersdans	ackordcittra (chord zither); accordion; fiddle; hackbräde; hummel; jaw harp; nyckelharpa; säckpipa; sälgpipa; skalmeja; spelpipa; stråkharpa; vevlira	spelmanslag; Zorn Badge
Swiss	yodeling		alphorn	
Tosk	See Albanian	–	–	–
Transylvanian	See Hungarian and Romanian	–	–	–
Ukrainian	dumy; troista muzyka	arkan; holubka; hutsulka; hopak; kolomyjka; kozachok; metelytsja; polka; waltz	bandura; fiddle; floyara; frilka; kobza; lira; sopilka; trembita; tsymbaly; tylynka	kobzari; lirnyky; pryspiv; zaspiv
Valencian	See Catalan	–	–	–
Venetian	See Italian	–	–	–
Vlach			bagpipe; fiddle	Pomana
Walloon			fiddle	
Welsh	penillion; Welsh choral music	clogging (Welsh step dance); hornpipe; twmpath	crwth; pibacwd; pibcorn; Welsh harp (triple harp)	dategeiniad; eisteddfod; gwerin; gwyl werin
