= Music of Norway =

Much has been learned about early music in Norway from physical artifacts found during archaeological digs. These include instruments such as the lur. Viking and medieval sagas also describe musical activity, as do the accounts of priests and pilgrims from all over Europe coming to visit St Olav's grave in Trondheim.

In the later part of the 19th century, Norway experienced economic growth leading to greater industrialization and urbanization. More music was made in the cities, and opera performances and symphony concerts were considered to be of high standards. In this era both prominent composers (like Edvard Grieg and Johan Svendsen) and performers combined the European traditions with Norwegian tones.

The import of music and musicians for dance and entertainment grew, and this continued in the 20th century, even more so when gramophone records and radio became common. In the last half of the 20th century, Norway, like many other countries in the world, underwent a roots revival that saw indigenous music being revived.

== Traditional and folk music ==
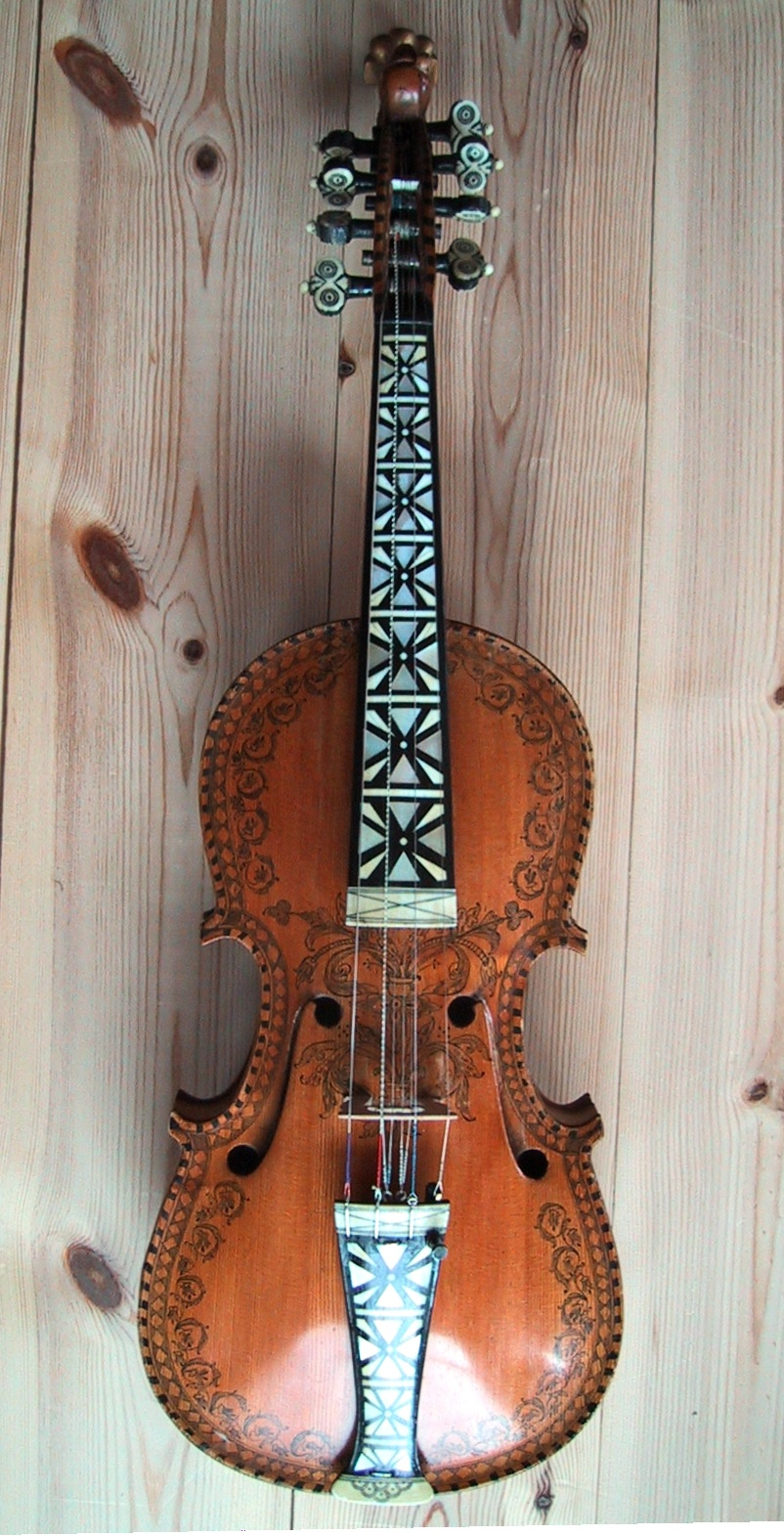
Traditional Norwegian Hardanger fiddle

Before 1840, there were limited written sources of folk music in Norway. Originally these historical attainments were believed to have a distinct Christian influence. As research continued, there were also mythical and fairy tale connections to the folk music. Overall the purpose of folk music was for entertainment and dancing.

Norwegian folk music may be divided into two categories: instrumental and vocal. As a rule instrumental folk music is dance music (slåtter). Norwegian folk dances are social dances and usually performed by couples, although there are a number of solo dances as well, such as the halling. Norway has very little of the ceremonial dance characteristic of other cultures. Dance melodies may be broken down into two types: two-beat and three-beat dances. The former are called halling, gangar or rull, whereas the latter are springar or springleik.

Traditional dances are normally referred to as bygdedans (village or regional dance). These dances, sometimes called "courting dances" were often connected to the important events of rural (farming) life: weddings, funerals and cyclical feasts like Christmas.

Folk music in Norway falls in another 2 main categories based in the ethnic populations from which they spring: North Germanic and Sami.

Traditional Sami music is centered around a particular vocal style called joik. Originally, joik referred to only one of several Sami singing styles, but in English the word is often used to refer to all types of traditional Sami singing. Its sound is comparable to the traditional chanting of some First Nations/Native Americans cultures.

Traditional North Germanic Norwegian vocal music includes (kvad), ballads and short, often improvised songs (stev), among the most common types of traditional music. Work songs, hymns, tralling vocals (nonsense syllables) and broadside ballads (skillingsviser) have also been popular.

Norway shares some Nordic dance music tradition with its neighbouring countries of Sweden and Denmark, where the most typical instrument is the fiddle. In Norway, the Hardanger fiddle (hardingfele), the most distinctive instrument in Norwegian folk music, looks and plays similar to a standard violin. It is only to be found primarily in the western and central part of the country. The Hardanger fiddle dates back to around 1700 and differs from the ordinary fiddle in many respects. The most important of these is that it has sympathetic strings and a less curved bridge and fingerboard. Thus, the performer plays on two strings most of the time, creating a typical bourdon style. The Hardanger fiddle tradition is rich and powerful. By traditional, orally conveyed instruction was one of the most important aspects of a Hardanger fiddle player's accomplishment.

Epic folk songs are the most important form of vocal folk music in Norway. Although there are many types of epic folk songs, the most intriguing are the medieval ballads. They were first transcribed in the 1800s, but the ballad tradition has been handed down from the Middle Ages. The lyrics of these songs also revolve around this period of history, recounting tales of the lives of nobles, and of knights and maidens. A number of the ballads describe historical events, and they are often dramatic and tragic.

In the second half of the 19th century, some fiddlers, especially those from Voss and Telemark, significantly Lars Fykerud (who eventually moved to Stoughton, Wisconsin in the United States and then returned to Telemark late in life), began introducing more expressive ways of playing, turning the traditional slått music to concert music for the urban classes.

At the same time, new dances and tunes were imported from Europe, including the fandango, reinlender, waltz, polka and mazurka. These forms are now known as runddans (round dances) or gammeldans (old dances).

Perhaps the most popular and controversial of modern Hardanger fiddle artists is Annbjørg Lien, who released her first album, Annbjørg in 1989. The album featured Helge Førde and Frode Fjellheim and was both praised for its innovative fusion work and expressive style, and criticized for its watering-down of traditional sounds and a lack of regional tradition.

Other Norwegian traditional instruments include:

- bukkehorn (goat horn)
- harpeleik (chorded zither)
- langeleik (box dulcimer)
- lur (an older, trumpet-like instrument)
- seljefløyte, a willow flute
- tungehorn and Melhus (clarinets)
- munnharpe

As of today, there is an eclectic use of both folk music and its traditional instruments. Interest in folk music is growing, and there are a number of promising young performers. They are not only drawn to instrumental music, however. Many young people are now learning to sing in the traditional style. During the past few decades (since the folk-rock trend), folk musicians have shown a greater interest in experimentation. A new generation has emerged which, while showing respect for the old traditions, is also willing to think along new lines. A number of well-known folk music artists in Norway have made excellent recordings using new instruments and new arrangements. In recent years artists like Gåte and Odd Nordstoga have made folk music more accessible to younger crowds. Gåte fused folk music with metal and became very popular. Lumsk is another band mixing Norwegian traditional folk music with metal. The most famous Sami singer is undoubtedly Mari Boine, who sings a type of minimalist folk-rock with joik roots. Karl Seglem is a Norwegian musician and composer who plays saxophone and bukkehorn. Sofia Jannok is also a popular Sami contemporary artist.

There are also some important institutions, for example the National Association of Folk Musicians. It is an organization founded in 1923 for folk music artists and folk dancers and it is primarily a union for local and regional folk music associations, but it is also open to individual members. As of 1990, the national association had 6,000 members from approx. 125 different local organizations. The National Association of Folk Musicians publishes Spelemannsbladet, a folk music journal that comes out 12 times a year. It also arranges the annual Landskappleiken (National Contest for Traditional Music), which is the most important event of its kind in Norway.

Folk music has a distinct part of Norwegian history, and most historical collection was done by L.M Lindeman. A large part of the collections are maintained and preserved in the National Folk Music Collection and at the National Library.

Norwegian Broadcasting Corporation (NRK) uses and includes recordings of folk music from the archive of NRK, which contains over 50,000 recordings from 1934 until today, in addition to other recordings in the radio channels and the specialized radio channel NRK Folkemusikk.

== Classical music ==
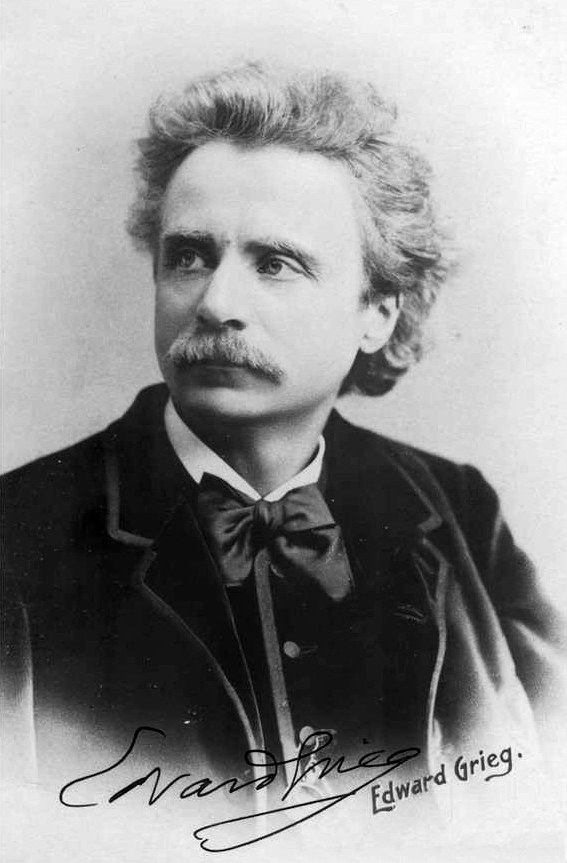
Edvard Grieg.

During the 1600s cities of Oslo, Bergen and Trondheim "each had their own city musicians." The first important classical composers from Norway are documented from the beginning of the 18th century, when they composed dance and chamber music, including cantatas. Some of these composers are Georg von Bertouch, Johan Daniel Berlin and Johan Henrik Berlin. In addition, music also received some interested from the public in which music developed steadily especially in more affluent urban areas. Moreover, around the 1750s private or semi-public music societies started appearing in several cities, given an opportunity for the wealthier population to enjoy. In 1814, Sweden entered into a union with Norway, and the Swedish royal family spent time in Norway's capital, Christiania (Oslo). At their royal court, music flourished.

=== National Romanticism ===
National romanticism, a movement that was prevalent throughout Europe, touched Norway as well, and began to affect classical musicians and classical music in the country. The violinist Ole Bull (1810–1880) was the first major Norwegian musician. He became world-famous starting in about 1834, playing not only in Norway but also in other parts of Europe and the US, and was known as the Nordic Paganini. In addition, a few other great composers emerged including Halfdan Kjerulf, Martin Andreas Udbye who composed the first Norwegian opera Fredkulla, and Rikard Nordraak who composed the Norwegian national anthem "Ja, vi elsker dette landet".

From about 1831, traditional Norwegian music began to influence the classical scene, especially through Bull, who befriended the famous traditional Hardanger fiddle player Myllarguten and through the friendship gained better understanding of traditional music. Bull himself started playing the Hardanger fiddle, and was the first to present folk tunes to the public in urban areas. He also saw to that Myllarguten played with him in concert, presenting a rural traditional musician to an urban audience for the very first time, in February 1849, at the very height of Norwegian romantic nationalism. This later inspired Edvard Grieg to look for folk musical sources. But urban audiences were slow to gain an appreciation and understanding of traditional (rural) music. Romanticism style dominated Norwegian music "until well into the 20th century, whether expressed through modifications to the national Romantic idiom of Grieg or through a more classical/international line" like Catharinus Elling or Halfdan Cleve.

Foreign musicians began settling in Norway in the 1840s, bringing with them musical knowledge from the rest of Europe. Following the French Revolution of 1848, Norway saw the development of a strong national consciousness, as well as economic growth which occurred the development of music. In comparison to most other countries of this period, female Norwegian musicians were widely accepted, and were even published and given stipends by the state.

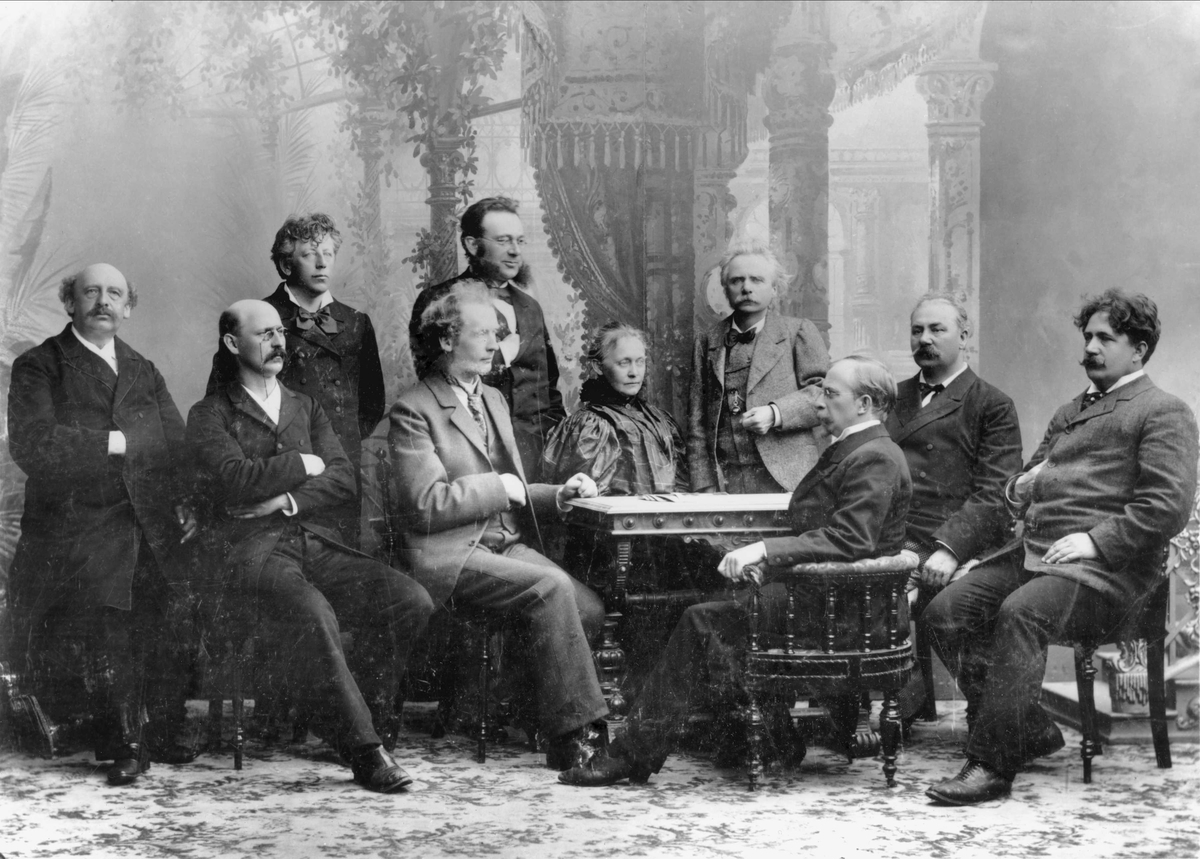
1898 Music festival in Bergen by Agnes Nyblin. Left to right: Christian Cappelen, Catharinus Elling, Ole Olsen, Gerhard Rosenkrone Schelderup, Iver Holter, Agathe Backer Grøndahl, Edvard Grieg, Christian Sinding, Johan Svendsen and Johan Halvorsen

With Norwegian nationalism burgeoning, the musical scene throughout the country entered the Golden Age of Norwegian Music, led by Halfdan Kjerulf and organist and collector Ludvig Mathias Lindeman. The Golden Age's most prominent composers included Johan Svendsen and Edvard Grieg. Bull's efforts directly inspired Grieg to look for folk musical sources. These composers, inspired by Lindeman's collections and Ole Bull's Hardanger fiddling, incorporated Norwegian folk elements into their compositions.

At the end of the 19th century, the collection of folk tunes continued unabated, and composers like Christian Sinding and Johan Halvorsen were well known. Following the dissolution of the union with Sweden in 1905, Norwegian nationalism continued to grow in popularity and innovation, led especially David Monrad Johansen, Geirr Tveitt and Eivind Groven. These composers looked towards using folk music in their compositions, a trend that continued well into World War II, through a process of internationalization began in the 1930s, easily heard in composers like Ludvig Irgens-Jensen, Bjarne Brustad, Harald Sæverud and Klaus Egge. In between the wars, only a few composers, like Pauline Hall and Fartein Valen, were significantly influenced by foreign styles.

=== Post World War II ===
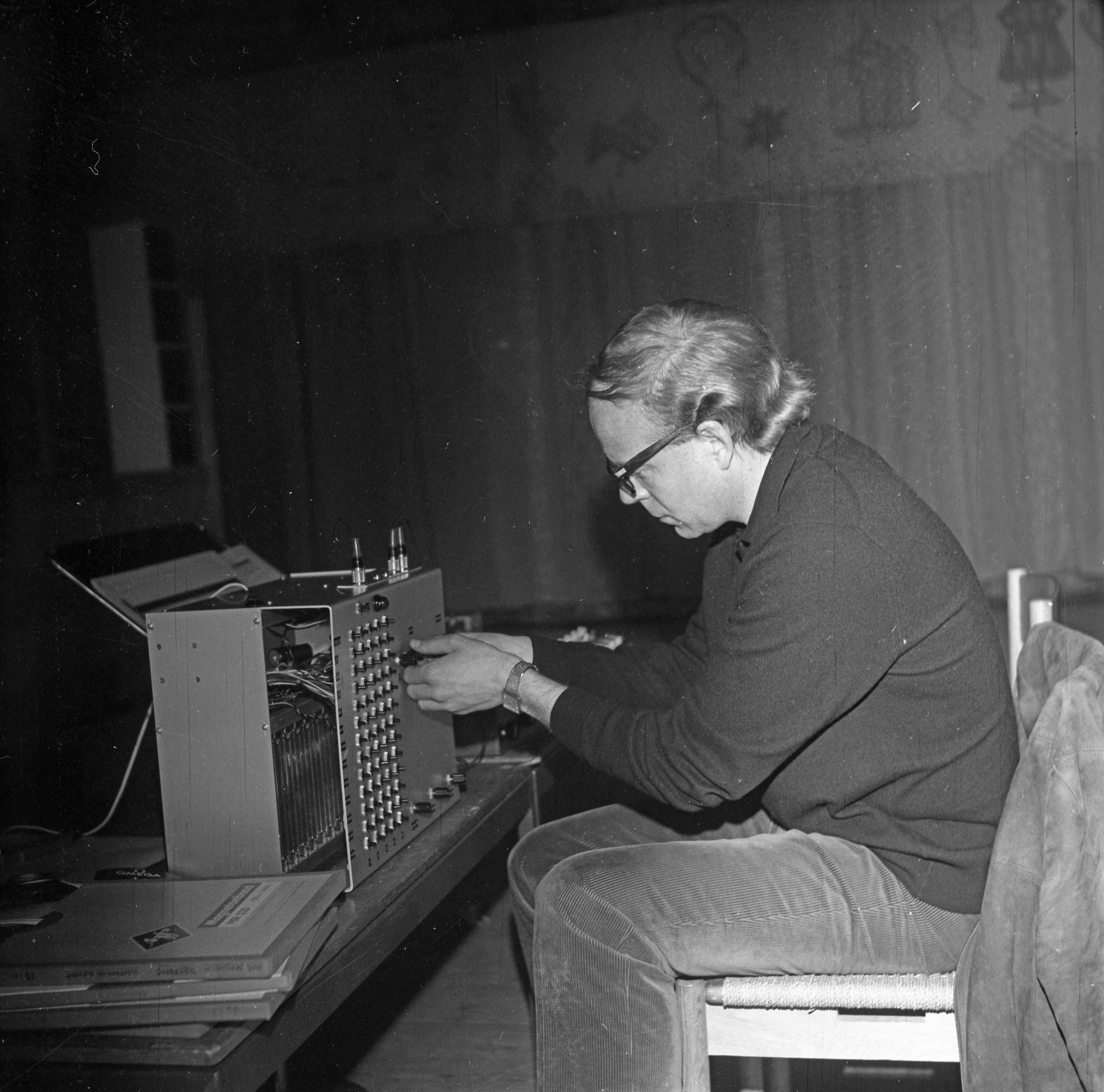
20th century composer Arne Nordheim

After World War II, Norwegian music began moving in a new direction, away from the Nordic and Germanic ideals of the past, and towards a more international, especially American, British and French, style. Norwegian composers were influenced by a wider variety of styles that included serialism, neo-expressionism, aleatory and electronic music. New composers of this period included Johan Kvandal, Knut Nystedt, Edvard Hagerup Bull and Egil Hovland. Of especial importance was French neo-classicism, Paul Hindemith and Béla Bartók. During this period, serial music appeared in Norway, led by Finn Mortensen. Later, avant garde composers like Arne Nordheim took advantage of technological developments, using a variety of electronic effects and bizarre instrumentation. Arne Nordheim "is the most important composer of the post-war era". Ever since 1950, Nordheim has had immense influence on Norwegian cultural life. His most famous pieces have served as milestone for contemporary Norwegian music.

Much of the Norwegian public did not appreciate the new direction these avant-garde composers were moving in, which helped to fuel a conservative backlash. Some composers, like Kåre Kolberg, reacted by writing simple music, while others, such as Alfred Janson and Ragnar Søderlind, revived romanticism. Some music from this era attempted to address social and political concerns, such as Janson's dedication of a violin concerto to Chilean president Salvador Allende.

By the end of the first decade of the 21st century, Norwegian classical music had become very diverse, incorporating elements from throughout the country's documented musical history, as well as modern jazz, pop and rock. Composers of the last part of the 20th century include Olav Anton Thommessen, Per Christian Jacobsen, Magne Hegdal, Åse Hedstrøm, Asbjørn Schaatun, Tor Halmrast, Glenn Erik Haugland, Nils Henrik Asheim, Cecille Ore and Ketil Hvoslef. 21st century composers include Marcus Paus and Maja Ratkje. Popular and classical attention to folk music has also continued through the work of composers like Lasse Thoresen.

Norway currently supports several orchestras of various sizes. There are two "national orchestras". Founded in 1765, Bergen Philharmonic Orchestra (Norway's oldest symphony orchestra), once conducted by Grieg, together with Oslo Philharmonic Orchestra, established in 1919, are the leading orchestras in Norway. In addition, some regional professional orchestras in Norway have been successful: Trondheim Symphony Orchestra, the Stavanger Symphony Orchestra, the Arctic Opera and Philharmonic Orchestra, the Norwegian Radio Orchestra, and the Kristiansand Symphony Orchestra. For the last couple of decades working conditions for professional orchestras in Norway's bigger cities have greatly improved due to the construction of larger concert halls and emergence of new conductors. In addition, the annual Bergen International Festival (founded in 1953) helps spread Norwegian music often music similar to that of Grieg's, as well as theatre and the visual arts, and also receives international culture. Moreover, other important festivals include the International Chamber Music Festival, the Oslo Chamber Music Festival, the Risør Chamber Music Festival and the Kristiansund Opera Festival.

In addition, the Oslo Philharmonic Orchestra has greatly contributed to Norwegian musical life, particularly conductor Mariss Jansons' impact on Norwegian music in the 1980s. Jansons was able to completely change people's idea of what part symphonic music in the Norwegian culture has played. Jansons was able to revive symphonic music and make the orchestra world-famous. They recorded an acclaimed set of Tchaikovsky symphonies and began regular international concert tours.

The Norwegian National Opera and Ballet has since the inauguration of their new house won admiration for their productions and expanded their number of spectators.

== Norwegian choir tradition ==
The oldest material evidence of choral music in Norway belongs to the 12th century, and as in all European choral singing, it was cultivated in monasteries and then in education centres, initially for religious purposes. Both the Catholic era and later the Lutheran reform of choral singing was important. However, the beginnings of a Norwegian tradition of choral singing itself took place during the 19th century.

On the one hand the cession of Norway from Denmark to Sweden arose a strong nationalist cultural motivation. On the other hand, the ideas Hans Georg Nägeli (1773–1836, Swiss) and Carl Friedrich Zelter (1758–1832, Germany) had given to choral singing reputed to be a particularly effective means of decimation of culture. This tradition is the joint work of composers, conductors, singing teachers and choral music publications. Lars Roverud, Friedrich August Reissiger, Ludvig Mathias Lindeman, Halfdan Kjerulf, Johan Conradi, and Johan Diederich Behrens are just some of the names that formed this Norwegian tradition before Edvard Grieg. They took more than one role in this complex socio-cultural development, each having a special merit.

The main contribution of Ludvig Mathias Lindeman was his collection of folk music and hymnody compilations, as well as the organization of a school for organists in 1883, which later became the Conservatory of Oslo. Kjerulf, Behrens and Conradi were the three directors of choirs and organizers of choral societies, but there was no doubt that Kjerulf stood out as composer, leaving more than 170 choral pieces, mostly for male quartet. Behrens and Conradi rather had a social role by organizing festivals such as the Craftmen Choir and the Businessmen Choir, as well as the Norwegian Students' Choir in Oslo and gradually in other regions. Behrens has a special reputation for having published compilations of Norwegian composers; there are over 500 songs in his volumes of "Collections of Part Songs for Male Voices".

The most influential era of these musicians was during the second half of the 19th century, a time when the popularity of choral singing spread throughout Norway, especially male singing for four voices. Proof of this is the legacy chorale singing left in the U.S., especially since the founding of St. Olaf College Choir by F. Melius Christiansen in 1912; there were said to be 3000 in attendance at mass services.

The choral tradition has since been used to strengthen the Norwegian identity. Conradi, Kjerulf and Reissiger wrote choral music with lyrics from Norwegian writers such as Ibsen or Bjørnson, who in turn wrote with the intention that their texts could be easily added to music. The 19th century was a time of intense collaboration between writers and composers, to use the existing popularity of musical societies and especially the male quartets were particularly popular from the 1840s. A second generation of conductors and composers continued this tradition until the beginning of the 20th century (Andreas Olaus Grøndahl in Oslo, and in Bergen Ingolf Schjøtt). The popularity of choral societies and choral festivals led to the first competitions starting in the 1850s. In 1878 the Choral Society held its first student events outside Scandinavia bringing Norwegian music and texts to Paris, this being a way to export and show Norwegian culture.

The nationalist motivation is exposed in the music of Grieg. Despite the tradition that remained during the transition to the 20th century, Norwegian choral music eventually changed, especially after WW1 when romantic ideals were abandoned. A new generation of composers arose including Egge, Nysted, and Sommerfeldt. These composers are still influenced by Grieg and found inspiration in not only national elements but also more recent musical trends.

Finally, more recent eras of economic prosperity in Norway has brought a second boom of choral music in the capital and beyond. Volda for example, a village of about 7,000 people in western Norway, has about 20 active choirs.

== World music ==
World music, a genre featuring influences from at least two cultural traditions, has become a small but lively musical genre in Norway. In Norway there are some musicians and bands whose music is categorized as world music. For example, the Irish-Norwegian Secret Garden, which won the Eurovision Song Contest in 1995, plays new age music. In addition, the well-reviewed Ras Nas mixes African music and reggae music with poetry. Vindrosa's music is traditional Norwegian folk songs with ethnic spices, and Annbjørg Lien blends traditional Norwegian music with jazz and rock. Several world music festivals are held in Norway each year. The Oslo World Music Festival was started by Concerts Norway (Rikskonsertene) in 1994, and the festival has introduced a multifaceted repertoire from Africa, Asia and Latin America ever since. The Riddu Riđđu festival was founded by the Sami associations in 1991 at first as a festival for Sami music and culture, but since then the festival has expanded to also concern international indigenous peoples. The association Samspill International Music Network (SIMN) is an organization for both musicians and dancers, and it promotes the position of world music in Norway. The organization coordinates information services, concert cooperation and seminars, and one of its main goals is to develop music and dance in Norway.

== Popular and contemporary music ==
As in other countries, Norway has developed its own forms of popular, contemporary music. Since 2000, Norwegian popular music has generally been appearing on the international scene, initially through breakthroughs by Norwegian jazz and blues artists, then followed by electronica and pop artists.

=== Blues ===
One of Norway's top blues guitarists is Knut Reiersrud. He has also taken inspiration from traditional Norwegian music forms, including tuning a Stratocaster guitar like the Norwegian langeleik, calling it a Hallingcaster (a word play on the Norwegian term for the hat kick used in athletic dance usually performed by men, the halling). Reiersrud has made some recordings with Norwegian organist Iver Kleive. Bjørn Berge is another well-known blues guitarist. He is well known for his so-called "delta-funk" music, heavily inspired by 12-string delta blues and modern funk and rock bands. R&B stars include Noora Elweya Qadry, Winta and Mira Craig. Scandinavian's largest blues festival is held in Notodden every year in early August and draws over 30,000 fans from all corners of the blues world to the city of 12,000. Several blues festivals are held around Norway every year, for example, the Blues in Hell Festival (near Trondheim) and the Oslo Blues Fest in Bergen. The Blues in Hell Festival began in 1994 and attendance grew from 1500 in the first year to more than 20,000 in 2000. Since 1996, cooperation with the Norwegian Music Council has led to music seminars for youth and musicians at a high level of performance as a part of the festival.

=== Country ===
Norwegian country music themes include occurrences in everyday Norwegian life. Folk and country influences have been widely incorporated into modern-day country music. As dialects in Norway vary extensively, the music is distinct to regions and areas throughout the country. Hellbillies is one of Norway's most endorsed and successful country bands. Along with other modern country bands, there is an extensive use and integration of folk and rock music. Their song lyrics are written in the Hallingdal dialect and reflect Norwegians and their lives.

Norway has also produced country musicians like Heidi Hauge and Bjøro Håland. Other artists who sing about the common life and culture of Norway include Salhuskvintetten and Vinskvetten. Alf Bretteville-Jensen is a popular singer/songwriter whose intense, somewhat noir-flavored music incorporates elements of country, folk, and rock, using instruments such as acoustic and electric guitar, as well as pedal steel guitar.
Norway's largest country music festival is in Seljord Municipality every year in late July.

=== Dansband music ===
Dansband is a Swedish term for a band that plays dansbandsmusik. Dansbandsmusik is often danced to in pairs and features acoustic, electric, bass and steel guitars, drum, saxophone, accordion and keyboard. Its lyrics often address themes such as love, friendship, peace, nature and old memories. The genre developed primarily in Sweden, but has spread to neighbouring countries Denmark, Norway and the Swedish-speaking regions of Finland. When the genre came to Norway it was first called Svensktoppar. The main audience for dansband music is middle-aged adults. The music is often performed live at venues where the main focus is dancing, rather than watching the performance on stage. However, many dansbands also record albums and singles. The band Ole Ivars scored a 1999 hit with the song "Jag trodde änglarna fanns" together with Kikki Danielsson. Another famous Norwegian song, "Lys og varme", which was written by Åge Alexandersen, became a popular dansband song in Sweden, as "Ljus och värme".

=== Electronic and dance ===
Electronic music (or electronica) includes sounds that are produced using electronic technology, including synthesizers, drum machines, samplers and computers. Norwegian electronic music is dominated by Röyksopp, a duo from Tromsø playing contemporary electronic music.

Well-known musicians include the duo Bel Canto, and Biosphere, an ambient electronic musician. Other popular Norwegian musicians playing electronic music include Ralph Myerz and the Jack Herren Band, Lindstrøm, Prins Thomas, Todd Terje, Datarock, Flunk, Bermuda Triangle, Frost, Bjørn Torske, Sternklang and TeeBee.

From 2010 many Norwegian producers started gaining international success. One of the most important names is Kygo, who first with his remixes and then with his debut single "Firestone" and album "Cloud Nine" gained international success and became one of the most influential electronic dance music (EDM) producers in the genre of tropical house. A number of other Norwegian producers belong to this genre such as Matoma, Broiler and SeeB. Other notable names are Alan Walker, K-391, Lido, and Cashmere Cat.

A Norwegian festival called Insomnia specializes in innovative electronic music, and it is held every year in Tromsø.

During the 2010s worldwide electronic music boom, DJ and producer Fehrplay signed to international labels Pryda Friends and Anjunabeats and played at the Creamfields festival in 2013.

=== Hip hop ===
Hip-hop music is a genre of rhythmic music that is often accompanied by rapping. Hip-hop came to Norway in the summer of 1984 with the movie Beat Street that was shown in Norwegian cinemas. Hip-hop soon became a small but eager subculture and it expanded from breakdance and graffiti culture to include rap music. In the 1980s and 1990s Norwegian rap was mainly in English and the Norwegian hip-hop scene was strongly influenced by the American one. In the early 21st century, many artists started to use Norwegian instead of English, and at the same time rapping in different Norwegian dialects started to become more commonplace. Tungtvann was one of the first groups to rap in their own dialect. In the mid-2000s, hip-hop became more mainstream and new and unconventional groups such as Side Brok emerged. Recently multilingual and multicultural Norwegian groups with minority backgrounds, such as Karpe Diem and Minoritet have succeeded in becoming popular.

Popular hip-hop artists and groups during the mid 2000s to the early 2010s include Warlocks, Tommy Tee, Lars Vaular, Klovner i Kamp, Gatas Parlament, Paperboys, Madcon, Erik og Kriss, Jaa9 & OnkelP and Karpe. Tommy Tee, known as the 'godfather of Norwegian hip-hop', is the owner of the leading Norwegian hip-hop label Tee Productions located in Oslo.

During the periods of c. 2011-2012, a series of freestyle cyphers existed called National Cypher. The most notable freestyle would be the first 2011 cypher.

Madcon, a Norwegian hip-hop and pop duo, was established in 1992 by Yosef Wolde-Mariam and Tshawe Baqwa. They released their first known single in 2000 with the track God Forgive Me. They first gained attention in Norway with their feature on the track Barcelona by Paperboys in 2002. They released their debut album It's All A Madcon in 2004. The album heavily features influences, both in vocabulary and in sound reminiscent of US hip-hop at the time, but with a unique spin. The group would gain little popular attention from the release, however the release of So Dark The Con Of Man in 2007 did. The song Beggin', a cover of the 1967 track by The Four Seasons, reached a peak of #2 on the Norwegian VG-lista, as well as reaching the top 10 across Europe, and even #1 in several others and #33 in the USA. The track would very likely inspire the cover by Måneskin of the track in 2021. They would switch to rapping in Norwegian with their album Contakt, featuring nearly a dozen popular Norwegian artists, and making the charts in Norway. Yosef Wolde-Mariam featured on the track Påfugl by Karpe Diem in 2012. The track would very likely inspire the cover by Måneskin of the track in 2021. Yosef Wolde-Mariam featured on the track Påfugl by Karpe Diem in 2012. Madcon would release the English-spoken single Don't Worry in 2015, which would reach levels of popularity surpassing Beggin's. They would release the album Icon in 2013, and the album Contakt Vol.2 in 2018. Contakt Vol.2 would receive especially little attention, likely in part due to its lack of availability across other countries on streaming platforms. They have largely faded from the public eye since.

Madcon marks Norwegian hip-hop history as the only Norwegian rap group to earn major recognition internationally.

Karpe (known as Karpe Diem in the period 2000–2018) is a rap, pop, and pop-rap group made up of the artists Magdi Omar Ytreeide Abdelmaguid and Chirag Rashmikant Patel. Magdi and Chirag were both born in the summer of 1984 and grew up together in Lørenskog, a part of northern Oslo. Magdi and Chirag first met in 1998 in the Oslo Handelsgymnasium, where they were both studying and making music individually. The duo was formed in 2000. They would release their debut EP in 2004, Glasskår, and their debut album Rett Fra Hjertet in 2006. They would release more albums in 2008, 2010, 2012 and 2019.

Karpe Diem would end up being the most successful Norwegian hip-hop group in the country's history.

=== Jazz ===
In 1898, the so-called Negerkapellet (a band of African-Americans) toured Norway, as a result of Geo Jackson's efforts.

Jazz came to Europe after the first World War and, in that time, the term "jazz" was commonly used to describe everything new and hip. The first foreign jazz orchestra came to Norway in 1921 and the emergence of the saxophone among Norwegian jazz players was observed in 1923. Soon the typical Norwegian jazz band developed, which consists of one or two saxophones, violin, piano, banjo and drums. Funny Boys made the first serious Norwegian jazz record in 1938. However, the economic crisis of the 1930s weakened the further development of Norwegian jazz bands. From the 1940s on, the violin started to play a more fundamental role in Norwegian jazz. In recent years Norway has also become a major force in world jazz. Jazz plays an important role in everyday Norwegian music life, and can be heard in bars, cafes, and in the streets. Oslo is the center of today's Norwegian jazz.

Pioneers of Norwegian jazz include Jan Garbarek. His cool, almost ambient approach is typical of Norwegian jazz, although recently there have been moves to build bridges with electronica and post-rock. He, too, has linked jazz with traditional Norwegian music, as evidenced in his recording Rosenfole with acclaimed Norwegian traditional-style singer, Agnes Buen Garnås. His daughter, Anja Garbarek, is one of the artists that has renovated the jazz scene, combining sweet melodies with electronic sounds and pop beats. The work of the Christian Wallumrod Ensemble ("Fabula Suite Lugano", The Zoo Is Far) serves as a leading example of contemporary Norwegian jazz, along with ECM Records artists Trygve Seim and Frode Haltli. Other contemporary Norwegian jazz stars include the group Supersilent, drummer Jon Christensen, guitarist Terje Rypdal, pianist Bugge Wesseltoft, percussionist Paal Nilssen-Love, bassist Ingebrigt Håker Flaten, trumpeter Nils Petter Molvaer, and experimental jazz band Jaga Jazzist. Many of these artists record for the seminal jazz label ECM. However, some of the more modern artists record for the newer Norwegian labels Rune Grammofon, Smalltown Supersound, Losen Records, Inner Ear, Curling Legs, Jazzaway Records, All Ice Records, Ponca Jazz Records, NorCD, Jazzland Records and Smalltown Superjazzz.

=== Pop and rock ===
Norwegian popular music has come from the many urban scenes such as the Bergen scene or Oslo's underground. The strengthening of Norwegian popular music has been brought by the growth of festivals, the many new independent (indie) record labels, a new generation of eager and talented music industry professionals as well as more supportive domestic media. The establishment of NRK (Norwegian National Broadcasting) in 1933 contributed to the spread of popular music. Additionally, British and North American radio stations, along with an import of jazz and rock records, widened the musical tastes of most Norwegians.

by:Larm is a festival that promotes popular music in Norway. The event holds both conferences and a music festival. Norwegian and foreign music industries can meet at the conference and there are also seminars and debate. Most of the musicians performing at the festival are up-and-coming artists. Music awards in Norway, such as Spellemannprisen, and TV shows such as Kjempesjansen may have also some influence on popular music in Norway.

Troubadour Alf Prøysen (1914–70) stands out as a brilliant songwriter of the 1940s, 1950s and 1960s, his songs often featuring lyrics connected with the local culture of the Hedmark area. Many of his songs have become popular classics. In the 1950s, the Monn Keys, featuring Egil Monn-Iversen, Arne Bendiksen, Sølvi Wang, Per Asplin and Oddvar Sanne, became one of the most popular groups. Monn-Iversen (composer, producer and arranger at Chat Noir and NRK) and Bendiksen (arranger and record producer) were leading figures in Norwegian popular music throughout the 1960s.

There are not so many Norwegian popular artists who have made it to the international market. However, in the 1980s, Norwegian pop trio a-ha had meteoric international success when their 1985 debut Take On Me reached number one in the US and the UK. Known as the biggest music export from Norway, a-ha has sold more than 80 million records worldwide and holds the Guinness World Record for drawing the largest paying audience at a pop concert. Their highly successful 2010 Ending on a High Note Tour marked the end of a-ha's 25-year career. They performed at Rock in Rio 2015 in response to popular demand. Since the mid-1990s, Norwegian popular music has experienced a thorough transformation from a small and domestically-oriented scene into a rich and diverse society of musicians and industry representatives with their sights set on the international stage. Sissel Kyrkjebø, the singer commonly known as "Sissel", has also reached a level of worldwide popularity, especially after her voice appeared on the soundtrack for the 1997 film Titanic. Highlights of her career include singing the Olympic hymn at the 1994 Winter Olympics in Lillehammer, representing Norway at the Nobel Peace Prize Concert, and performing at the invitation of tenor greats Plácido Domingo and José Carreras at the first Christmas concert in Moscow after the fall of the Soviet Union.

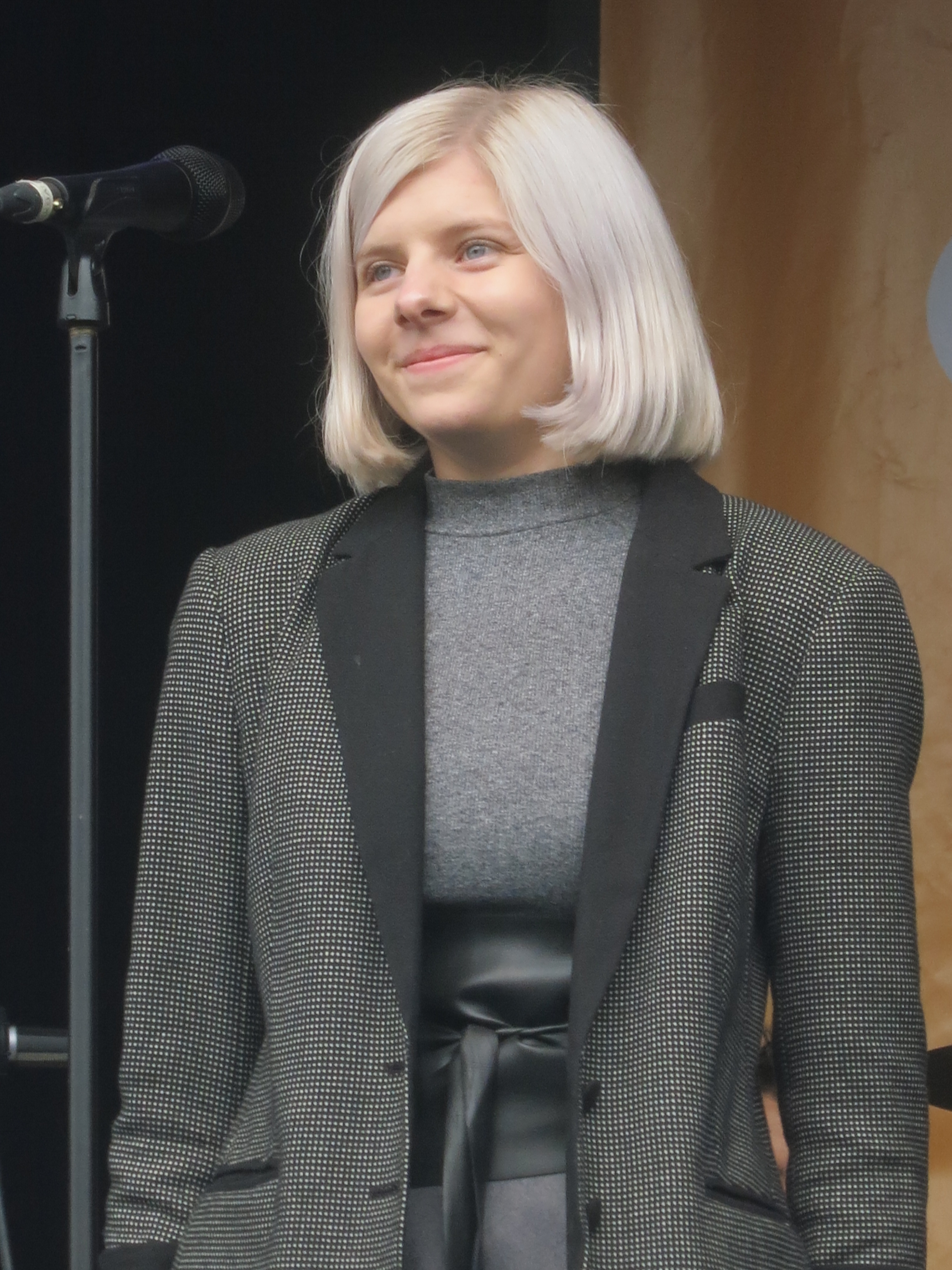
Aurora is one of the most internationally successful Norwegian artists

In recent years, a Bergen based pop-singer named Aurora Aksnes, known mononymously as Aurora, has gained international recognition. Her 2015 single "Runaway" has accumulated over 3 billion streams across streaming platforms, and her 2021 track "Cure for Me" has exceeded 100 million views on YouTube. Since her debut studio album All My Demons Greeting Me as a Friend in 2016, she has released five albums, and is considered one of Norway's most prominent artists. In 2019, Aurora contributed backing vocals to "Into the Unknown" for Disney's Frozen 2 and performed the song at the 92nd Academy Awards alongside Idina Menzel and nine international vocalists who dubbed the song in their respective languages. She continues to produce music and perform globally, with her 2024–25 What Happened to the Earth? tour attracting 275,000 attendees, including shows at prestigious venues such as the Royal Albert Hall and Wembley Arena.

Successful Norwegian music artists in pop and rock:

- A-ha
- Alan Walker
- Astrid S
- Aurora
- Bjørn Eidsvåg
- CC Cowboys
- Datarock
- Dagny
- DumDum Boys
- Girl in Red
- Highasakite
- Jahn Teigen
- Jakob (formerly Jakob Ogawa)
- John Olav Nilsen & Gjengen
- Kaizers Orchestra
- Kakkmaddafakka
- Kings of Convenience
- Kristian Kristensen
- Kurt Nilsen
- Kygo
- Lene Marlin
- Madrugada
- Marcus and Martinus
- Maria Mena
- Marit Larsen
- Moyka
- Postgirobygget
- Röyksopp
- Sigrid
- Sondre Justad
- Susanne Sundfør
- Thomas Dybdahl

=== Folk ===
In recent years artists like Gåte and Odd Nordstoga have made folk music more accessible to younger crowds. Gåte fused folk music with metal and became very popular. Lumsk is another band mixing Norwegian traditional folk music with metal. The most famous Sami singer is undoubtedly Mari Boine, who sings a type of minimalist folk-rock with joik roots. Karl Seglem is a Norwegian musician and composer who plays sax and bukkehorn.

A well known folk rock band called Plumbo has made an impact the last few years with songs like "Mökkamann" and especially "Ola Nordmann", which was their song of choice when they participated in Melody Grand Prix 2012. Other notable acts include Wardruna, which creates music based around Nordic Spiritualism, and Sturle Dagsland.

=== Heavy metal ===
==== Black metal ====
Norway is famous for black metal. Though not initially created in Norway, Norwegian bands and musicians have helped to develop the genre, influenced by bands like Bathory, Venom and Mercyful Fate. Norway's early black metal music was quite varied in experimentation and innovation – some bands (Mayhem, Emperor, and Gorgoroth) focused on creating a dark sound, others focused on using Viking elements (Borknagar, Enslaved), and still others (Limbonic Art, Dimmu Borgir) included keyboards to create the subgenre called symphonic black metal. However, the use of keyboards is not uncommon in black metal in general. Most bands tune to the key of E and the lyrics focus on themes like darkness, cold, sorrow, depression, evil, satanism and Norse Paganism. Mayhem is one of the most important black metal bands as it has helped to define the content of the genre. It was the center of a cult and the band set standards for extremity, for example in encouraging violence against churches. The leader of Mayhem, Øystein "Euronymous" Aarseth, clashed with bandmate Varg "Count Grishnackh" Vikernes (also known for his band Burzum). This eventually led to Vikernes killing Aarseth. Other controversial events in this scene include the suicide of former Mayhem vocalist Per Yngve "Dead" Ohlin in 1991, and the murder of a homosexual man in Lillehammer by then-Emperor drummer Bård "Faust" Eithun in 1992.

After Vikernes' confinement, the Norwegian black metal scene moved to a more open and imaginative environment, and in 1995, the second wave of Norwegian black metal began, making the genre more well known worldwide. Modern lyrics consist of themes concerning evil, Norse mythology, sex, violence and war.

Norwegian black metal bands include:

- 1349
- Abbath
- Ancient
- Arcturus
- Aura Noir
- Bloodthorn
- Borknagar
- Burzum
- Carpathian Forest
- Darkthrone
- Dimmu Borgir
- Dismal Euphony
- Dødheimsgard
- Drottnar
- Emperor
- Enslaved
- Fimbulwinter
- Gaahlskagg
- Gehenna
- God Seed
- Gorgoroth
- Grimfist
- Hades Almighty
- Helheim
- I
- Ihsahn
- Ildjarn
- Immortal
- In The Woods...
- Isengard
- Kampfar
- Keep of Kalessin
- Khold
- Koldbrann
- The Kovenant
- Kvelertak
- Limbonic Art
- Manes
- Mayhem
- Mysticum
- Nattefrost
- Obtained Enslavement
- Old Funeral
- Old Man's Child
- Orcustus
- Ov Hell
- Peccatum
- Ragnarok
- Satyricon
- Strid
- Susperia
- Taake
- Thorns
- Thou Shalt Suffer
- Trelldom
- Tsjuder
- Tulus
- Ulver
- Urgehal
- Vreid
- Windir
- Zyklon

==== Gothic metal ====
Gothic metal is to be considered a subgenre of heavy metal. It links sinister, melancholic melodies with highly aggressive heavy metal. Musical characteristics are the use of keyboards and typically female singers. Vocal styles show a wide range of diversity, from clean to growling. The lyrics show great similarities to gothic rock. In Oslo, many goth metal music clubs can be found. The large Norwegian gothic metal scene includes bands like:

- Fleurety
- Leaves' Eyes (Norway & Germany)
- Lumsk
- Midnattsol (Norway & Germany)
- Myriads
- The Sins of Thy Beloved
- Sirenia
- Tristania
- Theatre of Tragedy
- Ved Buens Ende
- Virus

==== Death metal ====
Though less notable than its black metal scene, Norway is known for death metal. In contrast to black metal, death metal uses frequent tempo and time signature changes. In death metal, the vocals are usually low and guttural, as opposed to black metal vocals which are usually high-pitched. The sound in general is distorted and heavy, sometimes creating a "wall of sound". Famous Norwegian death metal bands include Blood Red Throne, Cadaver, Carpe Tenebrum, Myrkskog, Aeternus, Zyklon, and Fester, as well as Darkthrone's first album Soulside Journey.

== See also ==
- Sami music
- Norway in the Eurovision Song Contest
- Norwegian National Opera and Ballet
- Oslo Philharmonic
- Bergen Philharmonic Orchestra
- Stavanger Symphony Orchestra
- Trondheim Symphony Orchestra
- Kristiansand Symphony Orchestra
- Norwegian Radio Orchestra
- List of number one songs in Norway
- List of number one albums in Norway
- List of Norwegian musicians
- Norwegian Academy of Music
- Culture of Norway
