= Rikard Nordraak =

Norwegian composer (1842–1866)

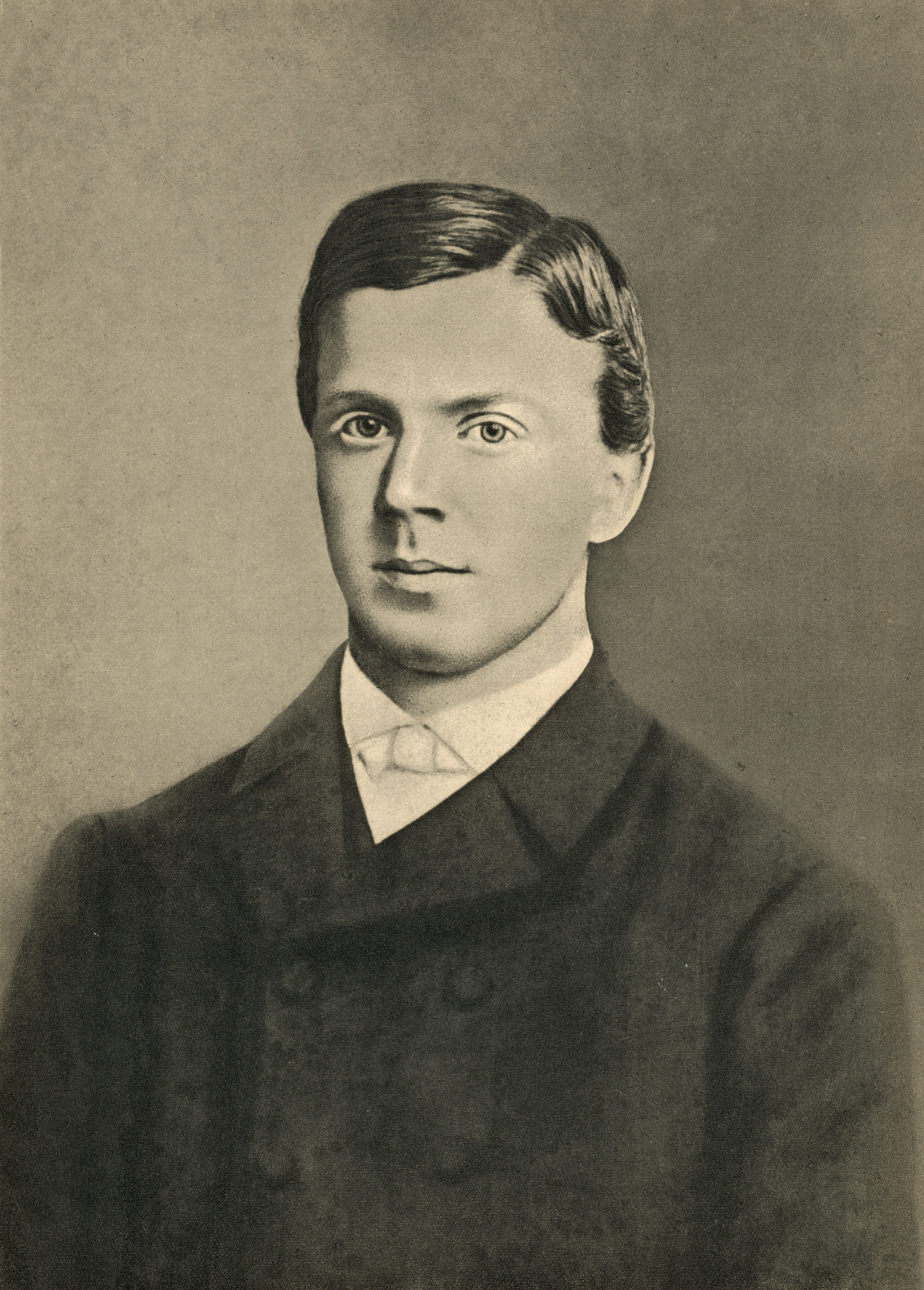
Rikard Nordraak

Rikard Nordraak (12 June 1842 – 20 March 1866) was a Norwegian composer. He is best known as the composer of the Norwegian national anthem, "Ja, vi elsker dette landet".

== Biography ==
Rikard Nordraak was born and grew up in Oslo, Norway.

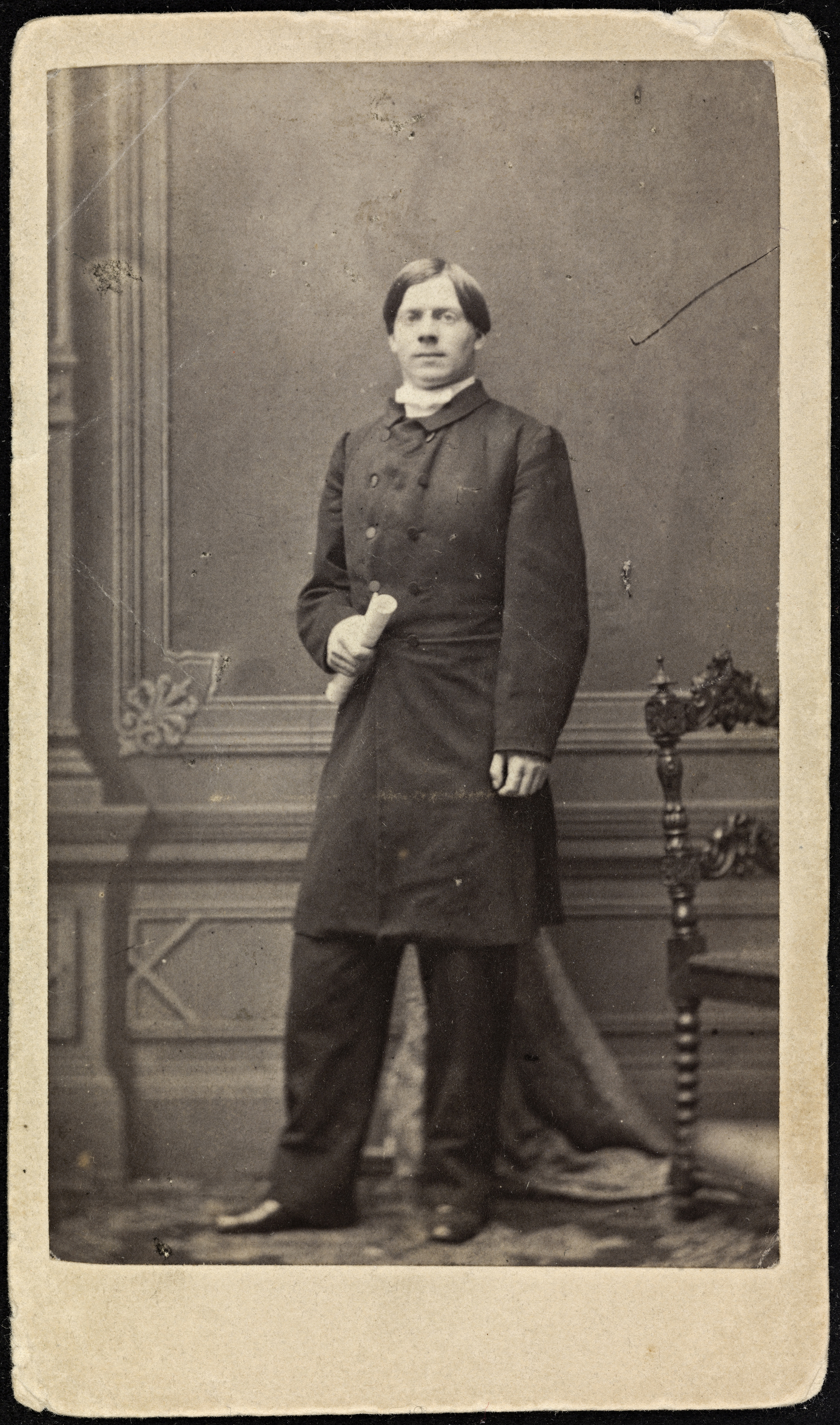
Nordraak in ca. 1860

In 1864, he met Edvard Grieg in Copenhagen and inspired him with the idea of devoting his genius to Norwegian melody and the cultivation of a specifically national art. Nordraak later wrote incidental music for Bjørnson's plays Maria Stuart i Skotland and Sigurd Slembe. He published his Fem norske Digte: Op. 2, consisting of songs and poems by Bjørnson and Jonas Lie. This was the last of his compositions that would be published during his lifetime.

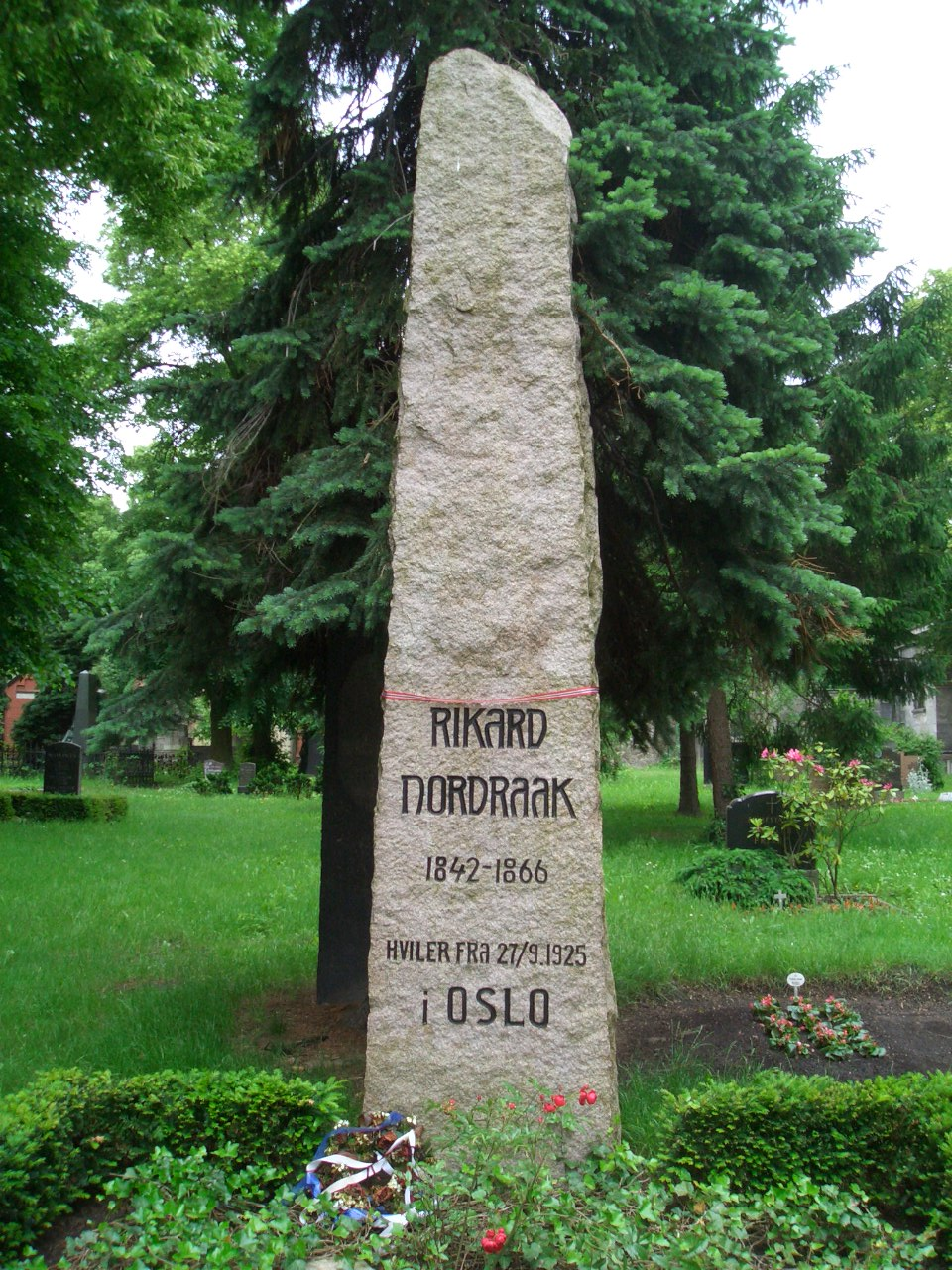
Rikard Nordraak's first grave in Berlin

In May 1865, he returned to Berlin to continue his education. In October 1865, he caught tuberculosis and died in Paris five months later. He was buried in Kirchhof Jerusalem in the Berlin neighborhood of Kreuzberg. In 1925, Nordraak's coffin was exhumed and reburied in the Honor Grove at Vår Frelsers gravlund in Oslo.

His Scherzo Capriccio for piano solo, given the opus number 3, was published posthumously by Edvard Grieg. The piece is a rondo, using several features from Norwegian folk music; rhythms typical in slåtter, and dissonances typical for the hardingfele. Rikard Nordraak. Samlede verker, a critical edition of Nordraak overall compositions were published by Øyvind Anker and Olav Gurvin (1942).

Nordraak inspired Grieg to compose Funeral March in Memory of Rikard Nordraak (Sørgemarsj over Rikard Nordraak). Part of his life story was dramatised in the musical Song of Norway.

== Quotation ==
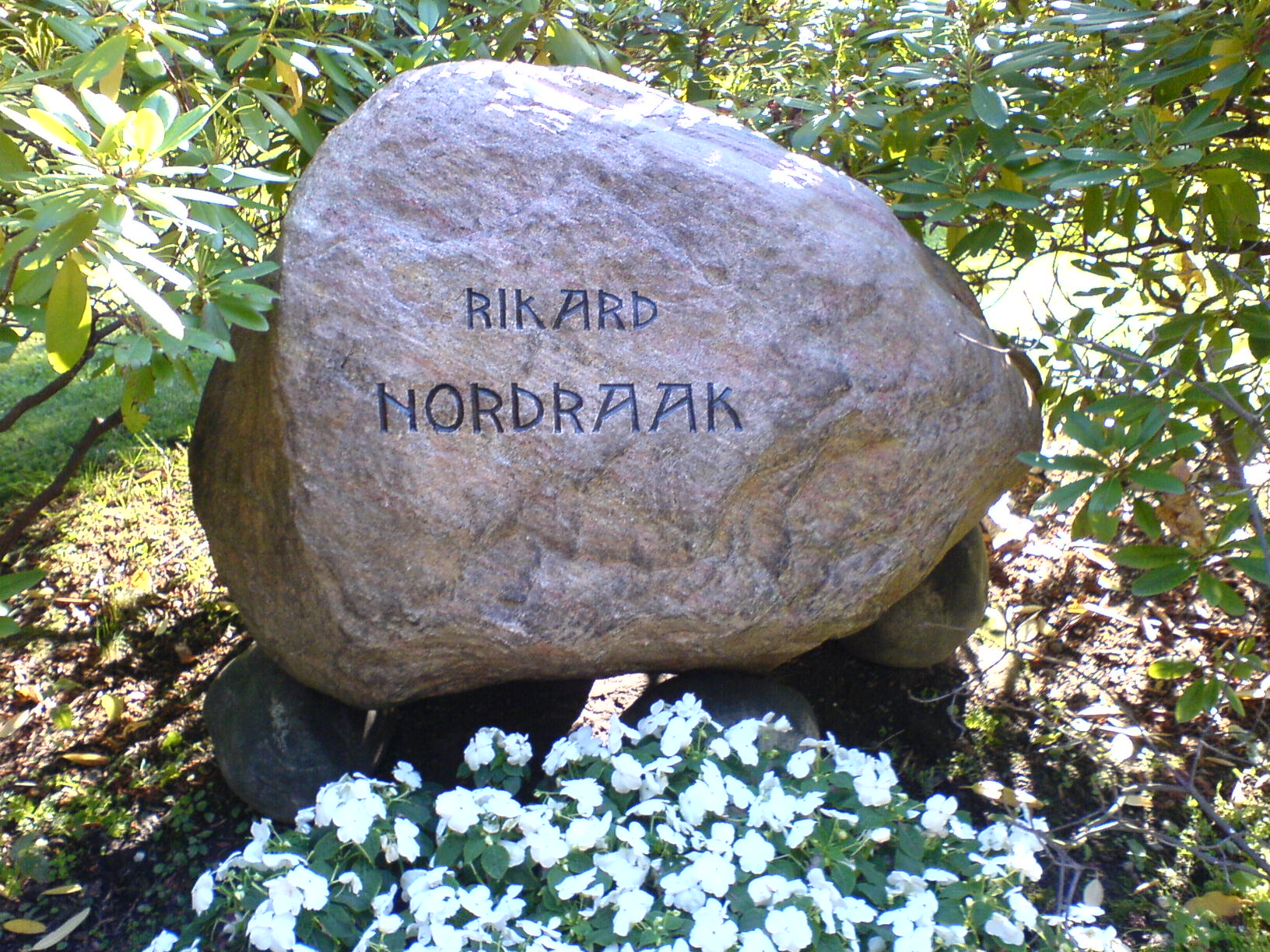
Rikard Nordraak's grave stone in Vår Frelsers gravlund in Oslo

Nordraak himself explained his musical faith in this way:

They talk of carrying rocks to Norway but we have enough rock. Let us simply use what we have. Nationalism, in music for example, does not mean composing more Hallings and Springar such as our forefathers composed. That is nonsense. No, it means building a house out of all these bits of rock and living in it. Listen to the unclothed plaintive melodies that wander, like so many orphans, round the countryside all over Norway. Gather them about you in a circle round the heart of love and let them all tell you their stories. Remember them all, reflect and then play each one afterwards so that you solve all riddles and everyone thinks you like his story best. Then they will be happy and cleave to your heart. Then you will be a national artist

— Rikard Nordraak,

== Other sources ==
- Grinde, Nils A History of Norwegian Music (University of Nebraska Press. 1991)
