= Polska (dance) =

Nordic dance and music genre

The polska (Swedish plural polskor) is a family of music and dance forms shared by the Nordic countries: called polsk in Denmark, polka or polska in Estonia, polska in Sweden and Finland, and by several different names in Norway. Norwegian variants include pols, rundom, springleik, and springar. The polska is almost always seen as a partner dance in 3/4 time, although variants in 2/4 time, as well as in compound meters also exist.

== Evolution ==
As suggested by the name, the roots of the polska are often traced back to the influence of the Polish court throughout the northern countries during the early 17th century. (Polska also happens to be homonymous with the Swedish word for the Polish language.) This view is sometimes challenged by those who see earlier evidence of the musical tradition in Nordic visor or songs, that may have become grafted onto the newer foreign influences when the court dances began to filter out into the middle class and rural communities. In addition, some earlier triple meter dances and melodies may have evolved into the polska.

The polska dances were likely inspired by court dances such as the polonaise or the 3/4 time minuet involving larger sets of people. Some see traces of the evolution from set dances to couples dances and from duple time to triple time in the minuets, still danced in some communities of Finland and Denmark. In these, the dance starts with a large set of dancers dancing a slower formal section and ends with couples or foursomes dancing a faster, more energetic polska section. In the late 1600s it was common in northern Europe that only the slower Alla breve or 4/4 section of the music was written down on paper, as paper was expensive. The musicians were expected to be able to improvise a dance in 3/4 which was based on the same motivic material as the previous dance. The parts played in 3/4 were the ones evolving to the modern polska.

In the prevalent 3/4 time form, polska dances were most common in Norway, Sweden and Swedish-speaking Finland, but with versions seen in Finnish-speaking Finland and in Denmark. It is best to discuss these dances by country as their regional histories, while contemporaneous, were quite varied and the dances known today differ significantly from one country to the next.

== Norway ==
Norway's dances show the most consistent living tradition, with unique local dances still performed socially today within specific regions or communities. There are two predominant broad types, each characterized by its own music, instrumentation, and dance tradition.

- Dances referred to as pols are commonly danced to music played on standard fiddles (violins) and largely adhere to a conventional structure composed of two eight-bar phrases, each phrase repeated, and then the whole structure repeated (a total of 64 three-beat measures). The dances typically have a structure that matches the phrasing, with a section in which the couple walks an elaborate promenade, a section in which they dance bakmes turn (upper body facing as a couple, bodies rotating counter-clockwise at a rate of one revolution per two measures), a section in escort position, and concluding with a section dancing the pols turn (bodies facing with the couple rotating clockwise at the rate of one turn per measure). Dances in this style were and are danced widely in Norway, predominately in eastern Norway and the mountainous spine bordering Sweden. Communities where this style is popular include the mining town of Røros, and others in the provinces of Trøndelag, Østerdal, and in Gudbrandsdalen, where the dance in this style is called springleik.
- The other strong tradition in Norway is the springdans (running dance) or springar, danced primarily in communities in western Norway and the fjord areas of west central Norway. Here, the music is played largely on the hardingfele (or Hardanger fiddle; a specially constructed fiddle fitted with four conventionally fingered and bowed strings but also resonating strings (usually five) that produce a distinctive droning sound). The music is also distinct in that tunes are built through the repetition and elaboration of short two- or four-measure motifs. The dance is similarly freer in form, led by the male through a spontaneous sequencing of standard movements as the couple moves through a large variety of holds and underarm turns (these movements appearing similar to modern swing and salsa although in a much slower style). In some traditions much of the dance may be danced with the couple near a single spot (e.g., springar danced in Telemark) while in others they may continue moving counterclockwise around the dance floor (e.g., those danced in Valdres and Hallingdal). The music and dance are still in triple time, but often composed of measures with very asymmetrical beats—for example, a short first and attendant longer second beat—in which the dancers' steps show adaptation to the unique rhythm.

== Sweden ==
In Sweden, the polska music tradition is continuous, with tunes and styles passed down through families, relatives, and neighbors. While styles have certainly evolved over time, the traditions and the roots can be traced back hundreds of years. In addition, through the 19th century a series of professional and semi-professional archivists travelled the land transcribing and annotating tunes. In contrast, however, polska dance traditions came under severe pressure during the industrialization of Sweden and, with few exceptions, succumbed entirely during the early 20th century. Most of what is known about Swedish polska dance comes from research conducted during the 1940s, 1950s, and 1960s. While some early films were located, researchers for the most part collected descriptions from older dancers—in some cases quite elderly ones—who had learned the dances in tradition from close relatives or others in an older generation.

On the other hand, what is known about Swedish polska dancing indicates a rich tradition with perhaps several hundred unique variations of the triple time dances and, frequently, a parallel music tradition of uniquely styled tunes. Broadly, there are three styles of music for Swedish polska:

- The semiquaver or sixteenth-note polska is typically played and danced in a smooth character and even rhythm. This style was characteristic of the music and dance in southern Sweden and up the eastern Baltic coast. Dances in Småland and other provinces of southern Sweden were typically slängpolskas with the couple dancing on a spot, often involving intricate patterns of holds and underarm turns similar to those seen in Norwegian springar. Farther up the coast the dances tended to become danced with couples moving counterclockwise around the periphery of the room (perhaps influenced by the introduction of the waltz) and devoting most of the dance to the clockwise couple turn where the couples face each other and make a full rotation with each measure (e.g., the village of Bingsjö in Dalarna and villages in the provinces of Hälsingland and Medelpad).
- The quaver or eighth-note polska is a pervasive style found throughout Sweden, but perhaps reaching its apotheosis in the folk district of Dalarna, where uniquely styled versions can be distinguished in communities only a few kilometers separated from one another or the next municipality (e.g., Boda, Rättvik, and Orsa). The accompanying dance styles tend to emphasize a clockwise couple turn alternating with a resting step in which couples walk—typically stepping on only the first and third beat—in escort position. Rhythms can also become asymmetrical, as for example, the early two seen in polska dances from western Dalarna danced in Älvdalen and Transtrand or the late third in the south of Dalarna. The wide variation in the placement of the second beat perhaps explains why Swedish fiddlers typically tap their feet on only the first and third beat.
- The triplet polska is the style most commonly seen in the mountainous western sections of the provinces bordering Norway: Värmland, western Dalarna, Jämtland and Härjedalen. The dance traditions show strong cross-border influences with many dances that combine phrase-matching sequences of elaborated promenading, bakmes (slower counterclockwise turning) and polska (faster clockwise turning) that are similar to those seen with Norwegian pols. This dance style is also seen with eighth note polska in the border areas.

A typical tune in the Swedish polska tradition shows a common structure, with two related eight-measure phrases, each repeated (a total of 32 bars constituting a single complete rendition of the tune), and the whole structure repeated two or more times. However, there are longer tunes (a storpolska or big polska has three or occasionally even four phrases) and there exist a number of tunes with odd numbers of measures per phrase and phrases that vary in length between parts. The first beat is not stressed except in hambo a dance from the beginning of the 20th century.

It is important that sharp lines and distinctions not be drawn. For example, all three styles of polska music form the historical traditions of Jämtland; sixteenth note polskas can also be found in virtually all areas of Sweden; and the placement of the second beat can be controversial even among fiddlers from the same community. Moreover, interesting counter-examples may be found for virtually any statement made in this article.

== See also ==
- Bygdedans - "Village dance", with further discussion of Norwegian Springar traditions
- Danish folk music
- Finnish folk music
- Folk dance
- Gammaldans - "Oldtime dance" in Nordic folk dance traditions
- Gangar
- Halling
- Hambo - 3/4-beat "national dance of Sweden", derived from the polska tradition
- Hardingfele
- Mazurka
- Minuet
- Music of Sweden
- Norwegian folk music
- Nyckelharpa
- Polka - 2/4-beat dance of Czech origin
- Polonaise - 3/4-beat slow dance of Polish origin
- Polka-mazurka - 3/4-beat dance, musically similar to the mazurka
- Swedish folk music
- Traditional Nordic dance music
- Waltz
- Ländler
- Fandango
- Bourrée
