= Dancis =

Dancis is a surname. Notable people with the name include:

- George Dancis (1931–2021), Australian basketball player, participant in the 1956 Summer Olympics
- Joseph Dancis (1916–2010), American pediatrician
- Mike Dancis (1939–2020), Australian basketball player, participant in the 1964 Summer Olympics
