= Hambo =

Swedish traditional dance

A hambo being danced at a contra dance in Massachusetts, U.S.

The hambo is a traditional dance that originated in Sweden in the late 19th and early 20th centuries. It is a couple dance in 3/4 time, danced to music played with a strong accent on the first beat and a tempo that varies from moderate to fast (100 to 120 beats per minute). The hambo is a dance with a fixed pattern and tunes almost always have a corresponding eight measure structure.

In Sweden, the hambo is in the gammaldans (old-time dance) tradition that, despite the name, arose fairly recently around the beginning of the 20th century. The dance is also danced in North America in the social clubs formed by immigrant Swedes, at International folk dance events and during breaks at contradance venues. Many social waltz groups include the hambo among their regular dances.

== History ==
One of the potential origins of hambo is the polka-mazurka, a dance with many turns that was popular in Europe during the second half of the 19th century. The term polska-mazurka can also be found in notebooks from the beginning of the 20th century used by Swedish farmer folk-musicians. Mazurka is however today in northern Europe the name of a different dance than hambo, mazurka is played faster with a fast and short jump on the third beat.

One of the turns in the dance was developed in about 1900 to a free-standing dance and was danced using older polska music, for example slängpolska, or other variants of polska, but with stronger emphasis on the first beat. In the early 20th century, an easier variant of hambo existed with a short forward step per beat for the first two measures before the turns began. The variants of hambo that are danced today, with so-called dalsteg (dal step) on the first two measures, was probably spread in the 1910s and 1920s.

Another potential origin is hambo-polska. From about the middle of the 19th century until the beginning of the 20th century hambo-polska was a very popular dance in parts of Sweden. Printed music exist for maybe a thousand hambo-polskor from this period. The title in printed music can however often be just polska. Hambo-polska, the dance and the music, is a mix between an older polska and newer dance like hambo without dalsteg and no particular stress on the first beat. Music is mostly in major. One theory is that the younger men who worked in the bigger town adopted their steps to new trends in the towns or did not learn the older dance but the younger women who still worked in the old villages kept the steps from an older polska.

The very common use of accordion as the dominant instrument for dancing music in the first half of the 20th century was possibly one of the reasons for more stress on the first beat in hambo.

== Hambo turn steps ==
=== Man's traditional part ===
Beat 1	Right foot step forward and begin turning clockwise, pivoting on the ball of the right foot.
Beat 2	Set down the left foot and continue to pivot (by now facing back in line of dance), continue turning on the ball of the left foot.
Beat 3	Bring the ball of the right foot even with the heel of the left foot (by now facing in towards the center of the room) and continue turning and back to Beat 1.

=== Woman's traditional part ===
Beat 1	Step left foot (and move the body) around the advancing lead, placing the ball of the foot down on the outside of the dance circle with back in the line of dance, continue pivoting on the ball of the left foot.
Beat 2	Set the ball of the right foot next to the instep of the left foot (by now facing in towards the center of the room), continue turning.
Beat 3	Step forward on the right foot and begin pivoting on the ball of the right foot and back to Beat 1

== Variations ==
The common modern variant of Hambo has a pattern of steps, repeated for each eight bars of music. The first two 3-beat measures are the dalsteg. On measure one, the couple holds inside hands (man's right, woman's left), step forward on their outside feet (man's left, woman's right), swing their inside foot slightly forward and out, and create a slight lift by raising the heel of the stationary outside foot. The second measure is a repeat but with opposite feet and the diagonal swing forward and inward. The third is a transition with both taking three steps forward (man left, right, left; woman right, left, right). The next four measures are hambo turns as described above while the eighth and final measure has three steps forward (man right, left, right; woman left, right, left), leaving outside feet ready to start the pattern over.

During the late 19th and early 20th centuries, when the hambo was introduced, the eight bar pattern with the slower dalsteg and faster turns was carried back to the Swedish country villages where it influenced and in turn was influenced by the pre-existing, older polska dances. Consequently, scores of variations were created, some of which are still known and danced today thanks to the research of folklorists. Apart from such historical versions, differences exist in versions danced widely today—for example, the version danced in the Swedish Hälsingehambo competition tends to be slow and elegant with a relatively strong svikt (dip and lift) while that danced in American contradance venues is much faster with little svikt.

== Competition ==
Sweden hosts an annual hambo world championship, called Hälsingehambon.

== Other music styles and dances in Swedish traditional folk ==
- polska
- slängpolska
- snoa
- schottis
- waltz
- polkett
- gånglåt
- wedding march
