= Slängpolska =

The Slängpolska (Swedish plural slängpolskor; "släng" Swed. for "toss, throw, chuck" and directly cognate to the English "to sling") is a Swedish folk dance and sometimes also the description of certain folk music tunes. The dances bearing the name slängpolska can be divided into two major types.

The first type is for two or four people, and is one of the sixteenth-note versions of the polska. The dances of this type usually have in common that they are danced on the spot, either during parts of the dance or during the entire dance. Focus is on different holds and on the divisions between them, and these divisions could be responsible for the name slängpolska. A typical slängpolska of this type could consist of two basic set positions: one in which the couple is spinning around one another while holding crossed hands outstretched with centrifugal force, the other in which the couple is spinning around one another in a closer position while holding the partner's shoulders and arms. The division between the two parts of the dance is then made by e.g. both dancers spinning out from their hold and then spinning once on their own with a clap of hands, followed by a returning to the hold. A common dance step consists of four steps distributed in the following way over three beats: one long, two short, one long ("one...-two-and-three..."). Beat 1, 2 and 3 have almost equal stress and length, which also is reflected in the corresponding music. A very free variant of this slängpolska type, consisting of walking through the room with different holds and turning on the spot with different holds and the same walking steps, could just as well be danced to 2/4 or 4/4 time music, as do the related Norwegian dances gangar and bonde, but in Sweden it is most commonly danced to 3/4 time music.

The second type of slängpolska is more related to other polskas than to the above slängpolska type, in that the couples move counterclockwise around the periphery of the room, and choose to do so with or without rotation clockwise around an internal axis, one full rotation for each measure. The music and dances in this category share a high tempo, giving a "tossing" feeling, which is often reflected in the rotation part of the dance in the form of a jump or a lift as part of the step recurring in every measure until the couple decides to dance without rotation for a while. The name has been used from midwest Sweden (Värmland) to the north of Sweden, and there is a large diversity in music and dance character, since the name mainly refers to the tempo. Both in midwest and north Sweden there are examples of dances which can both be danced as a slower "polska" and as a faster "slängpolska" with retention of the basic steps.
