= Bjørn Turtums gammeldansorkester =

Norwegian gammaldans ensemble

Bjørn Turtums gammeldansorkester are a Norwegian gammaldans ensemble which comes from Lom Municipality in Gudbrandsdalen.

== Crew ==
=== Members ===
- (1976-) Bjørn Turtum - accordion
- (1986-) Stig Rune Byrøygard - accordion
- (2010-) Ole Foss - violin
- (1988-) Kolbein Kjørren - guitar
- (2010-) Arne Stasviken - bass guitar

=== Earlier members ===
- Ole Kristian Gråv - violin
- Asbjørn Stensrud - violin
- Tor Arne Sandviken - bass guitar

== Discography ==
- Nytt frå bygdom (1994)
- På bukkeball (2007)

== Achievements ==
- 1993 Gold at "Landsfestivalen i Gamaldansmusikk", Stryn
- 1999 Silver at "Landsfestivalen i Gamaldansmusikk", Geilo
