= Lidovka =

Name of several Russian rural localities

Lidovka (Russian: Ли́довка) is the name of several rural localities in Russia:

- Lidovka, Nizhny Novgorod Oblast, a village in Balakhonikhinsky Selsoviet of Arzamassky District of Nizhny Novgorod Oblast
- Lidovka, Primorsky Krai, a village under the administrative jurisdiction of Dalnegorsk City Under Krai Jurisdiction, Primorsky Krai
