= Gammaldans =

Nordic dance set

Gammaldans (Swedish and Nynorsk) or Gammeldans (Danish and Bokmål) (literally "old dance") is a small set of Nordic dances that became broadly popular in the late 19th century. These were also the dances of the Nordic immigrant communities in the United States.

These are still danced socially and in dance groups and clubs and are often taught at some point during a child’s public school years. Most of these dances arose and became widely disseminated first at the beginning of the region's industrialization when communication between cities and smaller communities increased. Despite the name (which translates to "old dance"), gammaldans is a comparatively recent addition to the Nordic folk dance tradition.

== Dances ==
- Sweden: vals, mazurka, schottis, polka, polska, hambo, snoa
- Denmark: vals, mazurka, schottis, polka, hopsa, sønderhoning, fannik, turdans (totur, firetur, sekstur)
- Norway: vals, mazurka, reinlender, polka, pols, hoppvals
- Finland: valssi, masurkka, jenkka, polkka, humppa
- Iceland: vals, marsúrki, skottís, polki, ræll

The first four in each list are the same dance as named in each language. The first two are in triple (3/4) time. The pols and hambo are modern generic forms of older 3/4 time polska dances. The Finnish polka has a lively special step danced to 2/4 polka music.

== See also ==
- Bjørn Turtums gammeldansorkester
- Bygdedans village dance, Norwegian "springdans" or "springar" tradition
