= Holubka =

Ukrainian folk dance

Holubka (Ukrainian: Голyбкa) is a folk dance from western Ukraine. It is performed by amateurs, professional Ukrainian dance ensembles as well as other performers of folk dances. The literal meaning of holubka (голубка) is a female dove, the male being holub (голуб). Holubka evolved from ancient roundelays. It is commonly performed at weddings. The first holubka stage production was choreographed by Yaroslav Chuperchuk in 1956.
