= Almpfeiferl =

Austrian folk instrument

Woodwind instrument
- Hornbostel–Sachs classification: 421.221.12 (Fipple)

Related instruments
- Recorder, Fipple, Flageolet

The Almpfeiferl or Brucker Almpfeiferl is an Austrian folk instrument from the fipple family, descended from the baroque recorder, to which it is similar in design and playing style. The instrument has six finger holes, differentiating from traditional European flutes by the number and arrangement of the finger holes (not including flags closed when not in use). The holes are arranged with four on the front side of the instrument, and two one the back side. They tended to have a high pitch, around c'' (C6).

== History ==
The Almpfeiferl first appeared in the late 19th century, and was used both indoors and outdoors for dances, in conjunction with the violin, double bass, and Steirische Harmonika. It was sometimes accompanied by a guitar during up to the interwar period. The instrument is also known as the Brucker Almpfeiferl, after Bruck an der Mur in Upper Styria. The instrument ceased to be played in the latter half of the 19th century, with a few players in urban areas.

Almpfeiferl were mostly built by rural woodworkers and farmer who owned lathes, although they were also built by some instrument builders in Graz. They were still created and sold by flautist Dr Hans Robitsch until 1951, although these were built with seven finger holes on the front and one on the back.
