= Tungehorn =

Norwegian single-reed horn

A tungehorn with the reed tied to the blowing end

The tungehorn (Norwegian: tongue horn), also called flishorn (Norwegian: reed horn), is a single-reed instrument used in traditional Norwegian music. It is a bukkehorn, nearly always made from a goat horn, with a wooden tongue (tunge or flis), usually of juniper, tied along one side of the blowing end. The horn then works as a clarinet-type instrument rather than a lip-blown horn, with a sharper sound.

== Construction and playing ==
The reed is a separate piece tied to the instrument (a heteroglot single reed). It is generally made of juniper, but birch bark and metal have also been used. When playing, the player usually puts the blowing end with the reed a little way into the mouth, which serves as an air chamber.

Tungehorns tend to have more finger holes than lip-blown horns: four to six holes account for nearly 70 per cent of them, and in Reidar Sevåg's material all horns with seven or eight holes were tungehorns.

== Distribution ==
Atle Lien Jenssen found information on more than 160 tungehorns in Norway, just over 100 of them photographed, and concluded that the instrument appears to be unknown outside the Nordic countries. In Bjørn Aksdal's 2023 survey of 169 Norwegian horns, 53 were tungehorns, all but one of them made from goat horn.

According to Sevåg, the tungehorn dominated in Trøndelag, Gudbrandsdalen, Glåmdalen, Trysil and the lowlands around Mjøsa, while both types were found in Agder, Rogaland, Møre og Romsdal, southern Valdres, Nordland and Troms. In Sweden, Sevåg knew it only from Jämtland, and Aksdal notes that clarinet-type animal horns like the Norwegian ones are not known elsewhere around the Baltic Sea.

Jenssen identified about 25 tunes that were very probably played on the tungehorn, from large parts of the country.

== Age and origin ==
The oldest dated tungehorns are a goat horn from Gudbrandsdalen dated 1693, with five finger holes, and a horn from Solør dated 1714, with six.

The origin of the tungehorn is debated. Sevåg considered the lip-blown horn to be the older type. He discussed whether the tied-on reed could have been inspired by the European clarinet, but found this hard to accept: the clarinet did not reach the rural districts north of Oslo until about 1800, which left too little time for the tungehorn to spread so widely. He also found an independent Norwegian invention unlikely, and left the question open. Aksdal agrees that the clarinet is an unlikely model, since several tungehorns are dated before the clarinet can have reached Norway. Jenssen concluded that the tungehorn most probably originated in Norway before the European clarinet arrived, pointing to its construction and playing technique, which resemble medieval reed instruments such as the bagpipe, to the early dated horns, and to its wide distribution in the old summer-farm tradition.

== Sources ==
- Aksdal, Bjørn (2023). "Bukkehornet – en gjennomgang og analyse av trompethorn og tungehorn". Musikk og Tradisjon (in Norwegian) (37).
- Jenssen, Atle Lien (2010). Tungehornet i Norge: historie, utbredelse, repertoar, bruk og praktisk instrumentmaking (Master's thesis) (in Norwegian). Høgskolen i Telemark.
- Simenstad, Jørn, ed. (2017). NLB 20 år 1996–2016 (in Norwegian). Norsk Lur- og Bukkehornlag.
- Sevåg, Reidar (1973). Det gjallar og det læt: frå skremme- og lokkereiskapar til folkelege blåseinstrument (in Norwegian Nynorsk). Oslo: Det Norske Samlaget.
