= Aheng =

Instrumental ensemble

Aheng (from Turkish: Ahenk, meaning harmony in English) is a musical ensemble or the music played by the ensemble itself. The aim, structure and function of the aheng ensembles were defined in the musical ensembles in Albania and other Balkan countries in the 18th to 20th centuries.

== Sources ==
- Koço, Eno (2004), Albanian urban lyric song in the 1930s, Scarecrow Press, ISBN 978-0-8108-4890-0
