= Traditional Nordic dance music =

Regional style of folk music

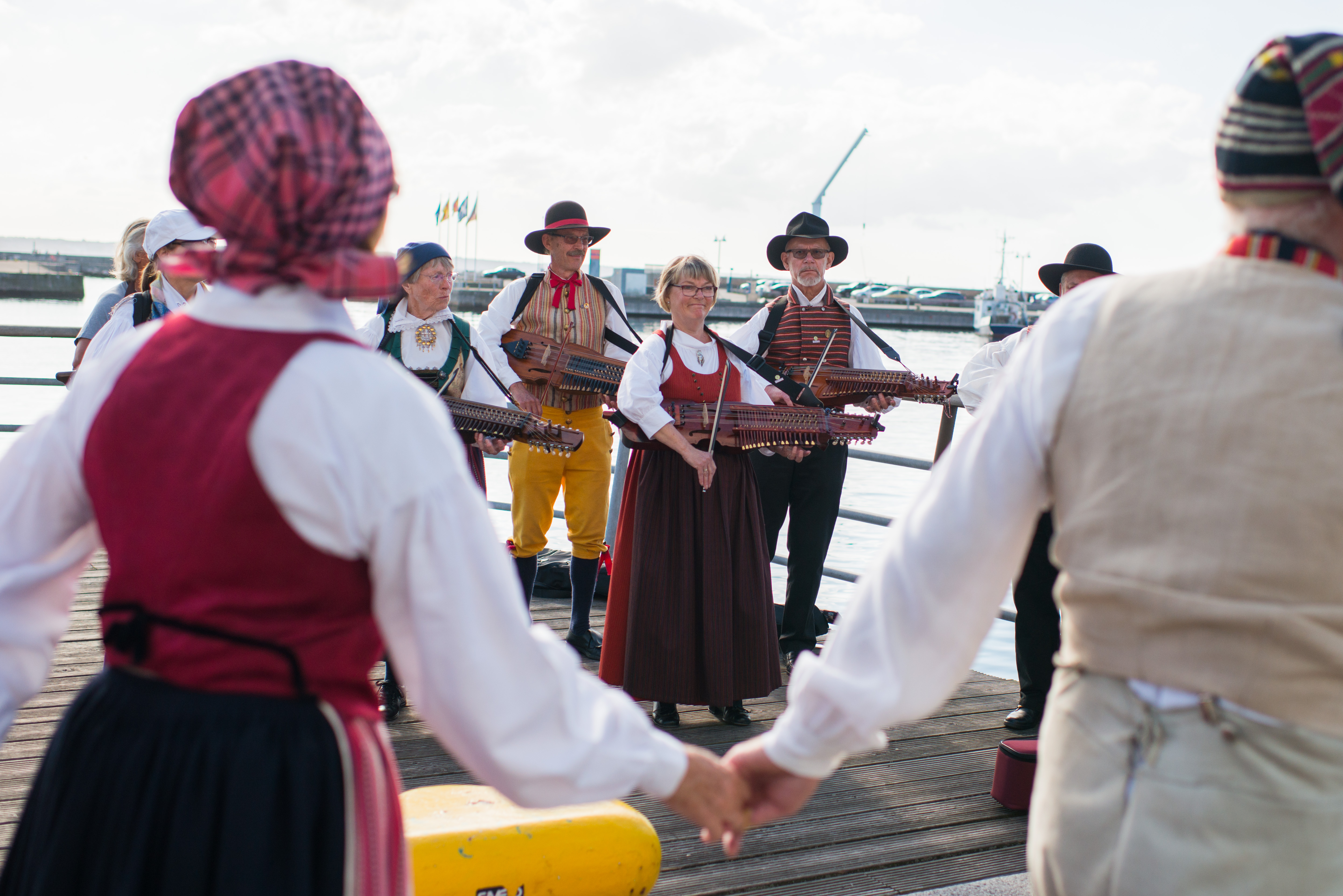
miniature

Traditional Nordic dance music is a type of traditional music or folk music that once was common in the mainland part of the Nordic countries — Scandinavia plus Finland. The person who plays this kind of music might be called speleman (Swedish/Norwegian), spelman (Swedish), spel(l)emann (Norwegian), pelimanni (Finnish) or spillemand (Danish). Finnish traditional dance music is often called pelimanni music in English, while there does not seem to exist a similar, widespread term for the corresponding music from the other countries. It is often more meaningful to distinguish between the traditional dance music from different regions than between music from the countries as such. Some concepts in the field can be defined as Norwegian or Finnish, but most are either common to all four countries or local. Besides the dance music tradition, all countries also have other traditions of folk music that are not shared to a similar extent.

Nordic folk dance music consists of various dance rhythms that do not originate in the Nordic countries but once were the fashion dances among the European nobility. With time these dances spread to common people, and in some cases they remained there long after the nobility had exchanged them for new fashionable dances. Many of these rhythms can also be found in other parts of Europe, and some of them have also been used in classical music.

The majority of the tunes are in minor keys. Traditionally, there were many tunes in keys that can not be classified as either minor or major (Modes). Traces of this still exist, but most of that disappeared when the accordion became popular. The majority of the dances that go with this music are partner dances, though exceptions do exist. Such exceptions include the minuets that are common in some parts of Finland and that can also be found in parts of Sweden, the solo-dance halling, generally considered typically Norwegian but also found in parts of Sweden, and the Finnish quadrille danced by several couples in formation. The most common dance rhythm is the polska. It is in 3/4 (three beats to the bar). In the most common polskas, the third beat is accentuated as well as the first. There are many local versions of the polska rhythm, and generally local variations of the accompanying dance correspond to these differences, though many of these local dances have disappeared. The schottische, also known as reinlender, polka and waltz are other common dance rhythms. In addition there are many other more uncommon dance rhythms (e.g. the anglais), despite a small number of surviving tunes.

The most typical instrument is the fiddle. In most cases normal violins are used, but there are exceptions such as the hardingfele, used in parts of Norway, which has a set of sympathetic strings in addition to the normal four strings. Another unique instrument, the nyckelharpa (keyed fiddle), a typical musical instrument found only in Sweden. Other instruments that were used traditionally were simple clarinets, and later accordions. The Swedish säckpipa is, as well as older types of nyckelharpa and hurdy-gurdy, a link to the older traditions of drone music. Contemporary Nordic traditional dance musicians might also use other less traditional instruments, as well as writing new tunes in the old style.

== See also ==
- Fiddle
- Hardanger fiddle
- Nyckelharpa
- Danish traditional music
