= Murciano =

Murciano is a Spanish surname. Notable people with the surname include:

- Carlos Murciano (born 1931), Spanish poet and author
- Enrique Murciano (born 1973), American actor
- Marianne Murciano, American television personality
