= Mike Dancis =

Australian basketball player (1939–2020)

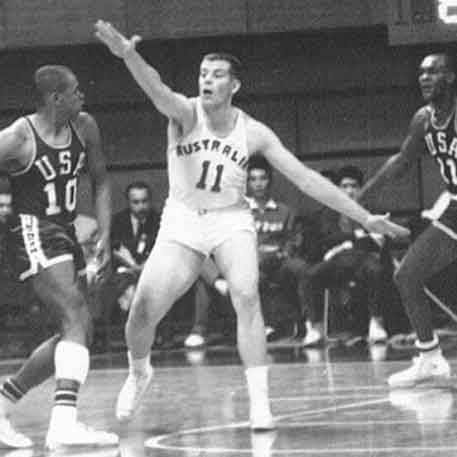

Personal information
- Full name: Miķelis Reinis Dancis
- Nationality: Australian
- Born: 10 September 1939 Riga, Latvia
- Died: 29 January 2020 (aged 80) Adelaide, South Australia

Sport
- Sport: Basketball

Miķelis Reinis "Mike" Dancis (10 September 1939 – 29 January 2020) was a Latvian-born Australian basketball player. His brother, George Dancis, was also a basketball player. He represented Australia at the 1964 Summer Olympics. Both Dancis brothers were awarded the Australian Sports Medal on 13 September 2000.

Godfather and a inspiration to his God song, Passed but not a moment of our time together waisited, always teaching and even today and tomorrow inspiring. Respect, for our Australian Olympic hero
