= Bygdedans =

Norwegian traditional dance

Bygdedans (or village dance) is the regional, traditional dance of Norway. Bygdedans are the oldest and most distinctive among Norwegian folk dances.

The music accompanying bygdedans is normally seen as the oldest living musical traditions in the country. These traditions have mainly survived in the more isolated farming communities of the country. In the urban areas and along the coastline where the interaction with other cultural expressions was more intense, these dances have been left behind in favour of new popular dances such as the gammeldans which became popular with the arrival of new instruments like the accordion.

The basic form of the bygdedans is the gangar (walking dance in 2/4 or 3/8) and the springar (running dance in even rhythm or 3/4) distinguished from each other mainly by tempo and intensity of the music and the dance. Both dances were characterised by a sequence of three parts: the figuring part; the free dancing part (lausdans) and the closed hold part (samdans).

Through time much regional variation has developed and most springar dances today have a clear 3/4 pulse, which character varies considerably regionally. For instance in Telemark the pulse is best characterised as longer – long – short, whereas in Valdres it is short – longer – long. The gangar today is only a living tradition in Telemark and Setesdal. In the western part of Norway the gangar and its traditional tunes have been taken over by rull or rudl, a dance with a more modern waltzing style. The more athletic Halling or Lausdans can also be seen as an heir of gangar but is mostly danced by men.

The areas of bygdedans correlate mainly with the regions where the hardanger fiddle is used as the main folk music instrument. In the parts of Norway where the violin is more common, the traditional dances like pols and springleik, have taken up more modern traits associated with the gammaldans.

== See also ==
- Music of Norway
- Polska (dance)
- Gammaldans

== Other sources ==
Larson, Leroy W. Scandinavian-American Folk Dance Music of the Norwegians in Minnesota (Ph.D. diss., University of Minnesota. 1975)
