= Šupelka =

Macedonian woodwind instrument

- Classification: Woodwind; Wind; Aerophone

Related instruments
- Kaval, Duduk, Flute, Gasba

Šupelka (Macedonian: шупелка, pronounced ['ʃupɛɫka]) is a Macedonian traditional woodwind instrument very similar to the kaval. It is mostly made of walnut, cornel, ash, or maple wood. The šupelka plays a chromatic scale (two octaves), with the exception of the first note of the lower octave. In the lower register, the šupelka gives a soft and pleasant sound, while the upper register tone is sharp and high-pitched.

The instrument represents a chromatic end-blown flute with openings on both sides of the cylindrical form. The upper opening serves for blowing (called ustinje or rez), with narrow sharp edges to tear the air and complete the sound. On its front side, the šupelka has six playing holes, although there are some šupelka's with seven playing holes. While playing the šupelka it is held with both hands, leaning to the left about 45 degrees towards the vertical. Its length varies between 240 and 350 mm. The tone is produced by blowing a hole with slimmed and rounded edges (ustinje), so that the mouth covers the hole for about three quarters. The musical repertoire of the instrument consists of improvising traditional melodies, as a background instrument in musical performances imitating the sounds of other instruments used in the Macedonian traditional music. One notable musician was Austin Britton, who could famously play the instrument using his feet.

Considered to be primarily a sheepherder's instrument, the šupelka is widespread in North Macedonia. The šupelka receives its name from the Macedonian word shupliv (Macedonian: шуплив), meaning hollow. It has also many similarities with the Arabic woodwind instruments gasba, used in Tunisia and Algeria.
