= Jaleo =

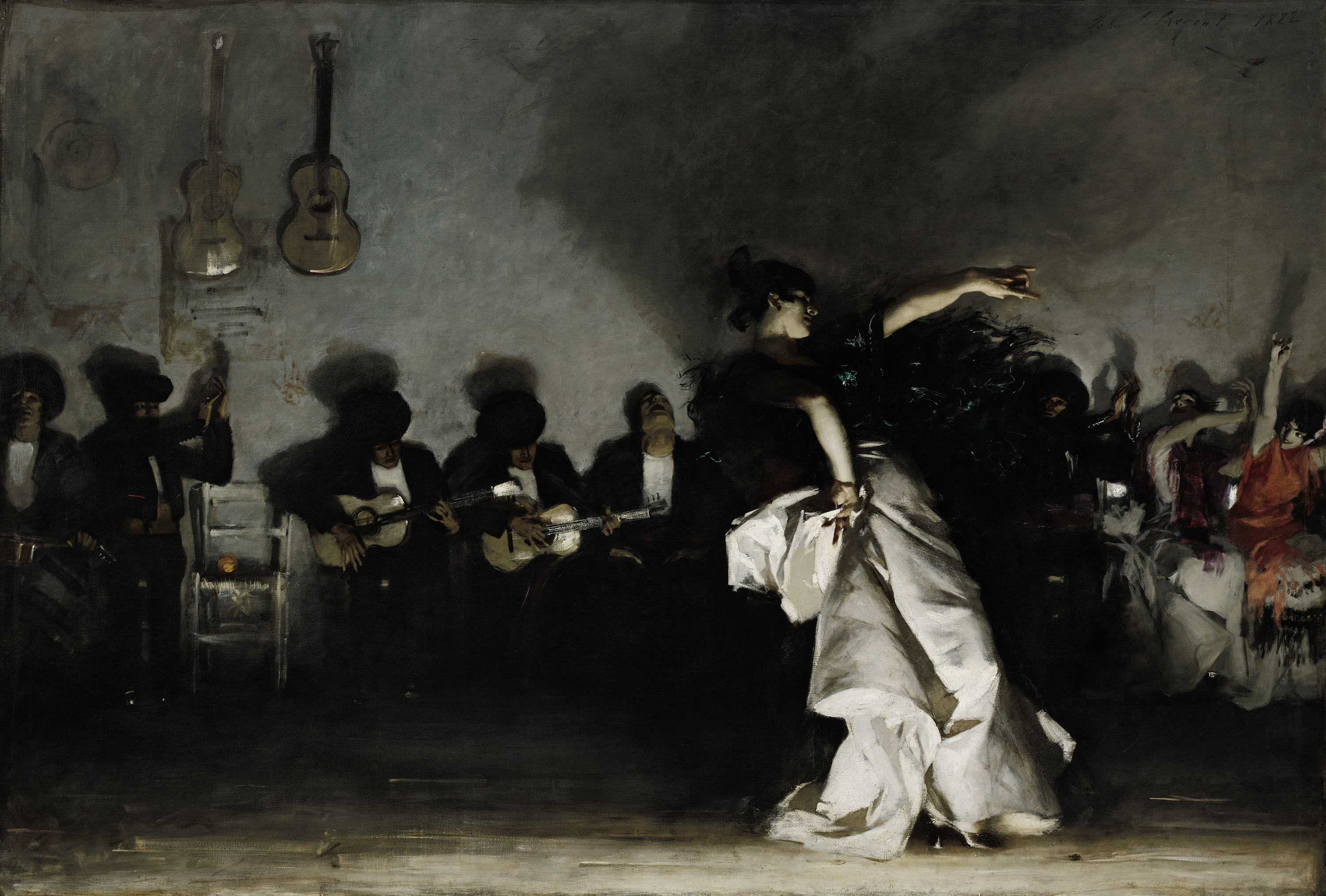
El Jaleo, John Singer Sargent, 1882

A jaleo is a feature of flamenco performance that involves rhythmic hand-clapping and vocal interjections used to encourage and support the performers.

In flamenco, jaleo often includes words of encouragement called out to singers, guitarists, or dancers, either individually or as a group. Common examples include olé and así se canta or así se baila ("that’s the way to sing" or "that’s the way to dance"). Performed in rhythm with the music, jaleo is considered an integral part of flamenco art.

The hand-clapping may be done with cupped hands to produce a hollow sound (sordas), or with stiff fingers striking the palm to create a sharper effect (altas). Other percussive techniques include finger-snapping (pitos), foot-stomping while seated, and clicking sounds.

"Three good jaleadores (performers of jaleo) can sound like ten. One will carry the rhythm, another the counter-rhythm, and the third will weave in and about the jaleo of the other two."

Although lively and spontaneous in appearance, jaleo is regarded as "a science in itself" requiring extensive training. Jaleadores performs both on stage and in recording studios, forming a "necessary and intricate component of flamenco" performance. Some flamenco albums even credit jaleadores in the liner notes alongside singers and guitarists.
