= Bukkehorn =

Scandinavian wind instrument made from an animal horn

- A Norwegian bukkehorn of the trumpet type

Woodwind instrument
- Other names: Bockhorn, Billy goat horn
- Classification: Wind; Aerophone

A bukkehorn (Norwegian) or bockhorn (Swedish), also called a "billy goat horn" in English, is a Scandinavian musical instrument made from an animal horn. It was traditionally used by herders and milkmaids on summer dairy farms in the mountains, as a signal instrument and to scare off predators. It is most commonly played with a brass-type embouchure, buzzing the lips against the mouthpiece, but a version with a single reed, the tungehorn, also exists.

== Name and material ==
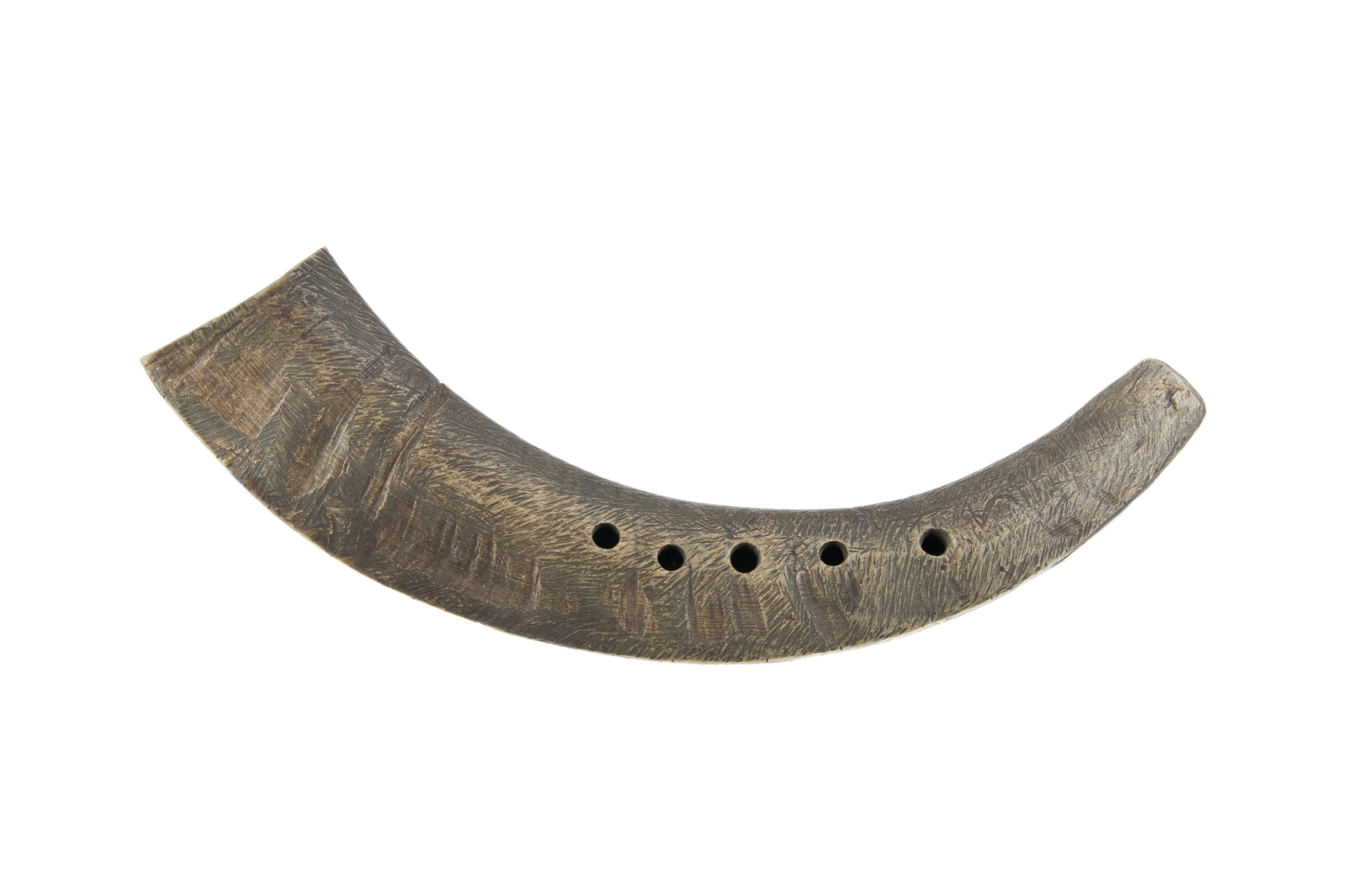
A Swedish bockhorn

In Norwegian, bukkehorn has become a general name for horns made to be played. The billy goat has been the main supplier, but horns of cows, oxen and rams have also been used. Local names include prillarhorn (a horn with finger holes "to trill on"), låtarhorn and spellarhorn, and stut, which usually means a short wind instrument.

To make the instrument, the core of the horn first had to be removed. It could be left to rot out, but the most common method was to soak the horn in water for a few days or to boil it, after which the core could be knocked loose. The tip was then cut off so that the bore opened, and finger holes were made.

== History ==
The organologist Reidar Sevåg considered it reasonable to assume that animal horns have been used as instruments in Norway since the Stone Age, and noted that the plain horn, without finger holes, remained in use in most Norwegian rural districts until about 1900. In Sweden two horns with finger holes have been found in the ground; one is thought to date from the Viking Age and the other to be somewhat older. The oldest dated finger-hole horn in Norway is an ox horn from Nord-Fron in Gudbrandsdalen with three finger holes, inscribed "ROLANDS HORN" and dated 1656.

Of the 96 Norwegian horns Sevåg registered, 56 were lip-blown and 40 had a reed. Among the lip-blown horns, three or four finger holes were the most common, and none had more than six.

== See also ==
- Music of Norway
- Music of Sweden
- Tungehorn
- Swedish cowhorn
- Cowhorn
- Shofar

== Sources ==
- Sevåg, Reidar (1973). Det gjallar og det læt: frå skremme- og lokkereiskapar til folkelege blåseinstrument (in Norwegian Nynorsk). Oslo: Det Norske Samlaget.
