= Marzas =

Marzas is the name given to the songs with which the month of March is received and the arrival of the spring season is celebrated. They are sung on the last day of February or the first of March in Cantabria and nearby areas in northern Spain. The young singers, called marceros, sing in exchange for traditional Cantabrian products such as cornbread, black pudding, chorizo, etc.
