= George Dancis =

Australian basketball player (1932–2021)

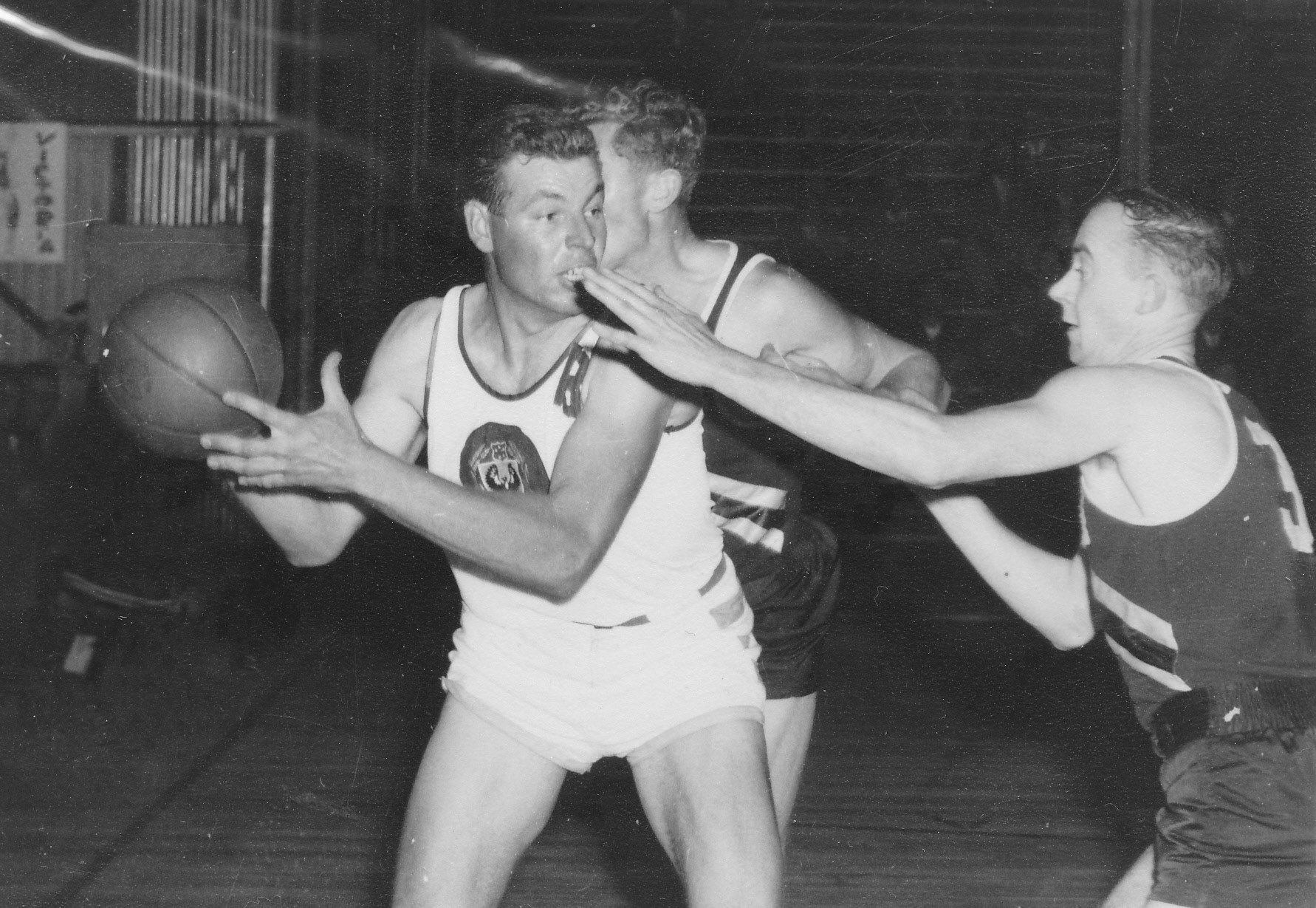
- Dancis playing basketball for South Australia

Personal information
- Full name: Juris O. Dancis
- Nationality: Australian
- Born: 28 November 1932; Riga, Latvia
- Died: 20 April 2021 (aged 88); Adelaide, South Australia

Sport
- Sport: Basketball

Juris O. "George" Dancis (28 November 1932 – 20 April 2021) was an Australian basketball player of Latvian descent who represented Australia at the 1956 Summer Olympics.

Born in Latvia, Dancis was raised in the district of Vecāķi. Dancis was married to Liesma, and they had a son, Pēteris. Dancis' younger brother, Miķelis Dancis, was also a member of the Australian Basketball team. Dancis and his family resided in Adelaide, South Australia.

On 13 September 2000, Dancis and his brother Mike were awarded the Australian Sports Medal. In 2006, he was inducted into the Australian Basketball Hall of Fame.
