= Pols =

Norwegian folk dance

The pols and springar are Norwegian folk dances in 3/4. They are essentially fast versions of the Nordic polska. The dance is considered to have come to Norway with labor immigration to the Norwegian mining industry in the 16th and 18th centuries. The dance is particularly widespread in Røros and the surrounding area – then often called rørospols.
