= Springar =

Norwegian folk dance

The springar is a Norwegian couple's folk dance with an uneven 3/4 rhythm, traditionally danced by a man and a woman. The man is given more opportunity to improvise his moves.
