= Halling (dance) =

Traditional Norwegian dance

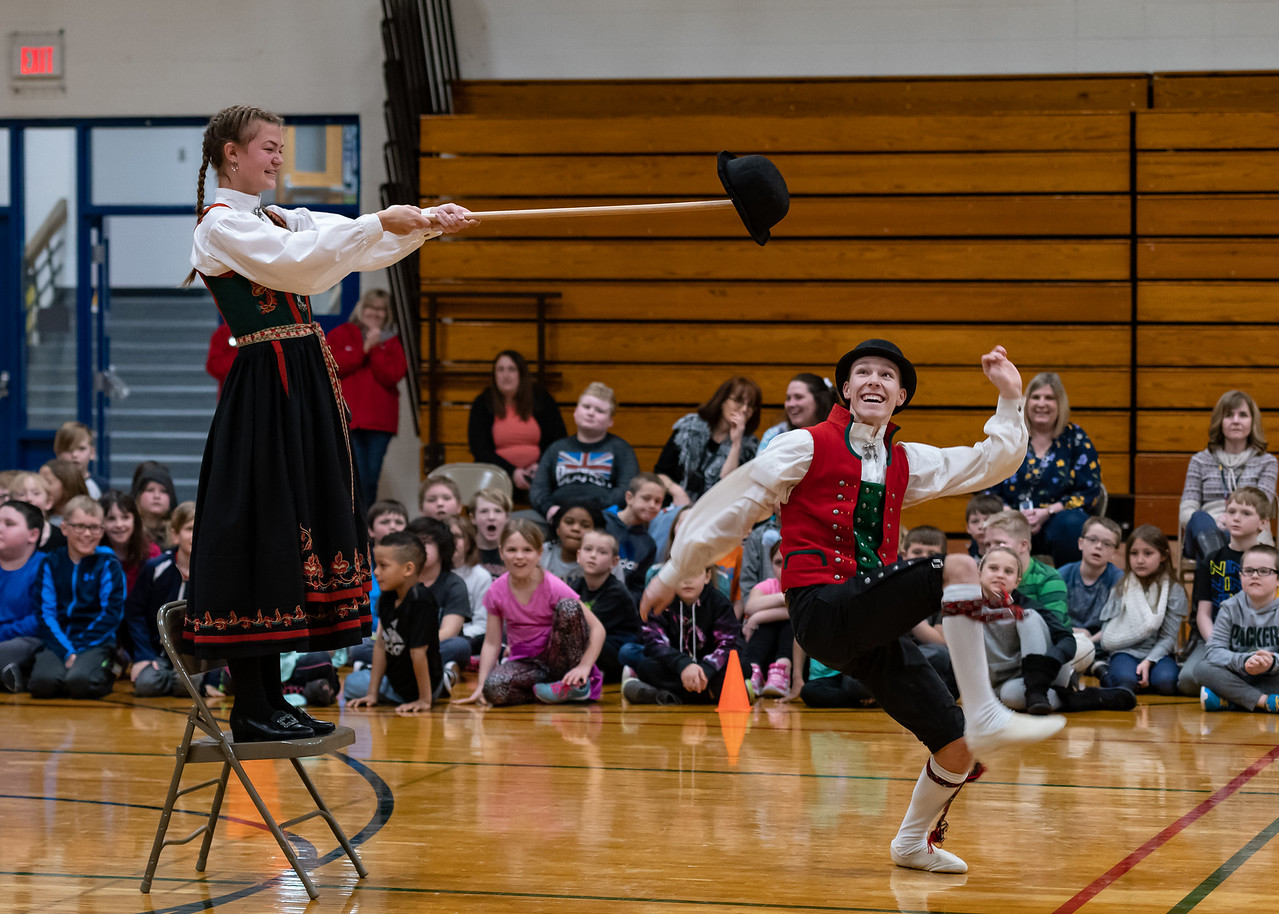
A member of the Stoughton High School Norwegian Dancers performs the hallingkast--"hat kick" at a Wisconsin elementary school.

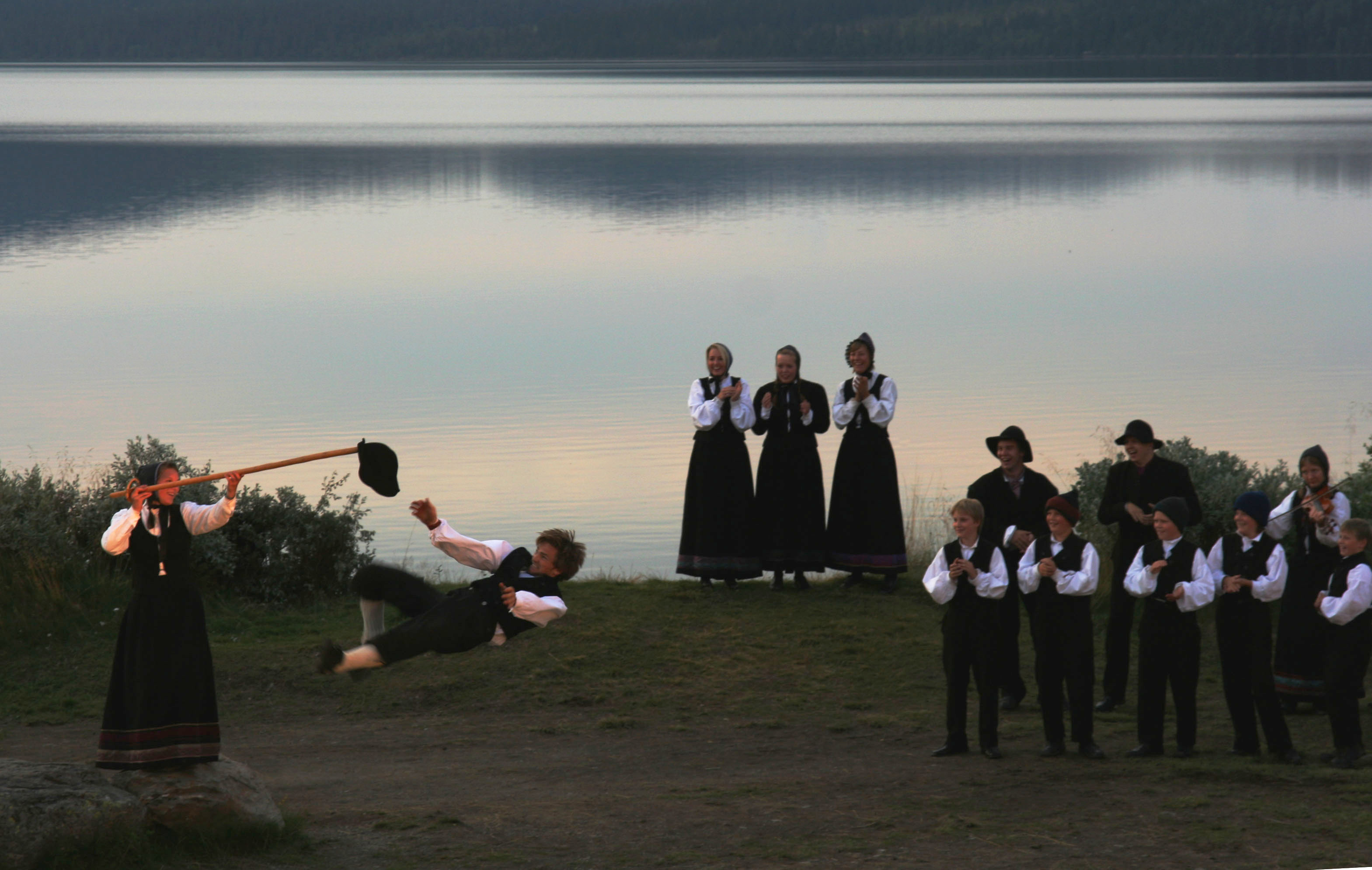
Hallgrim Hansegård (Frikar) demonstrating the Halling during the annual Peer Gynt Festival at Lake Gålå.

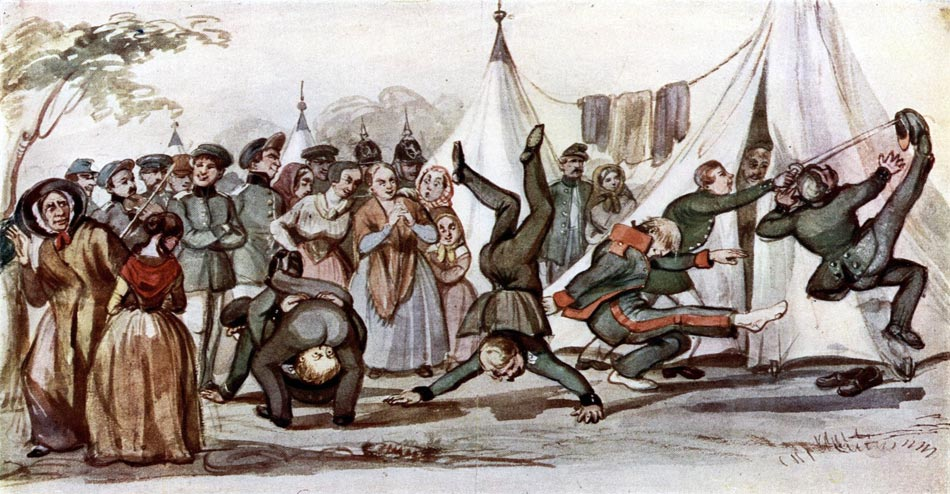
Halling dance 1848.

The Halling (hallingdansen) is a folk dance (bygdedans) traditionally performed in rural Norway, although versions of the halling can also be found in parts of Sweden. The dance is traditionally performed by young men at weddings and parties.

== Overview ==
The halling is a quick (95–106 bpm) dance in 6/8 or 2/4 that includes acrobatic, athletic competition between the dancers. Hallingdans can best be described as rhythmic acrobatic dance and consists of a number of steps which requires both strength and softness elation.

The dance is associated with the valleys and traditional districts of Valdres and Hallingdal, where it is often referred to as the laus (loose dance). The term refers to it being danced solo, not in couples (although coupled halling dancing is traditional in the western parts of the country). According to some scholars, the word may refer to the fact that the dance was "half" the performance, as the other half was the springar (after the fashion of a Renaissance dance suite).

The meter of the dance is 2/4 or 6/8 of a quite fast (95–106 bpm), sharp quality which calls for an experienced musician. The musician has to give the dancers enough impetus to perform the various challenging moves that are involved in the dance such as the nakkespretten (neck jump), kruking (hooked dancing), hodestift (going over the head) and especially the kast (throw). The dancer Olav Thorshaug performed hallingdans shows in the United States of America around 1910–1920, incorporating the headspin in his dance.

One of the dance moves is called hallingkast. In this move, a girl has traditionally held a hat high using a stick or something similar, and the dancer is supposed to kick down the hat. Kast is seen as the test of strength, which involves kicking a hat that is held about 230 to 280 cm above the floor. Some girls have been able dancers themselves, and known to be as agile as any man.

== In popular culture ==
Noted Norwegian composer Edvard Grieg composed several pieces of music for the halling dance in his Lyric Pieces. The finale of Geirr Tveitt's Piano Concerto No. 5, published in 1954, is described as 'Tempo di Halling'.

The dance was performed by the Frikar Dance Company to the Norwegian winning contribution for the 2009 Eurovision Song Contest, "Fairytale", by singer and fiddle player Alexander Rybak.

Frikar Dance Company has toured 29 countries with halling dance the last years. The company's founder and choreographer Hallgrim Hansegård is known as the reinventor of halling, exploring the tradition in meeting with new artistic expressions and arenas as for example in the computer game "Age of Conan".
