= Music of Spain =

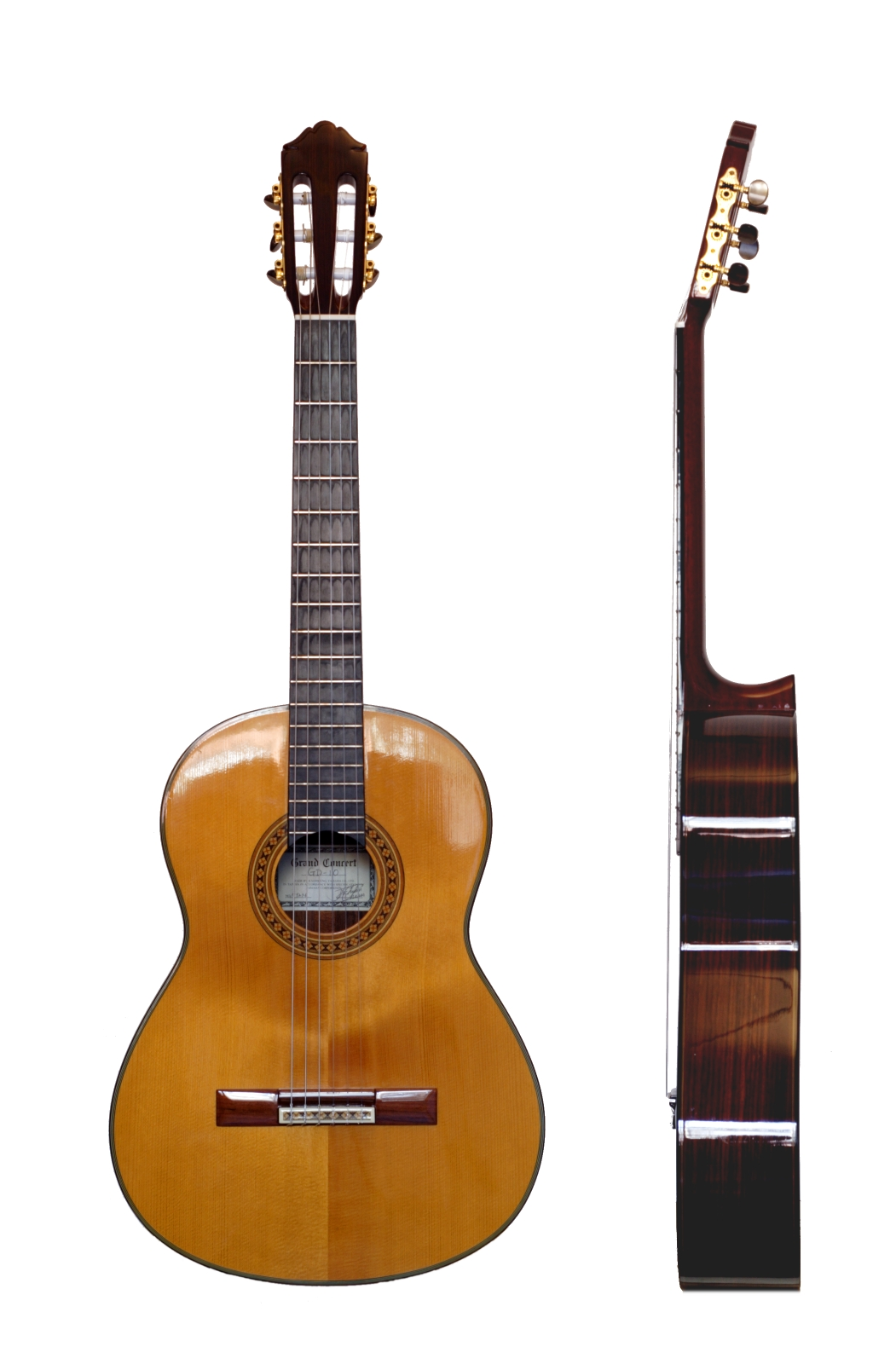
The modern classical guitar and its baroque predecessor were invented in Spain.

The musical traditions of Spain have played an important role in the development of both western classical and Latin American music. Spanish music includes many different traditional styles from across the country, among which flamenco and classical guitar are probably the best-known abroad. Music from the north-west regions is heavily reliant on bagpipes, the jota is widespread in the centre and north of the country, and flamenco originated in the south.

Spanish music played a notable part in the early developments of western classical music from the 15th through the early 17th century. The breadth of musical innovation can be seen in composers like Tomás Luis de Victoria, styles like the zarzuela of Spanish opera, the ballet of Manuel de Falla, and the classical guitar music of Francisco Tárrega. Nowadays, in Spain as elsewhere, various styles of commercial popular music are dominant.

== Origins ==
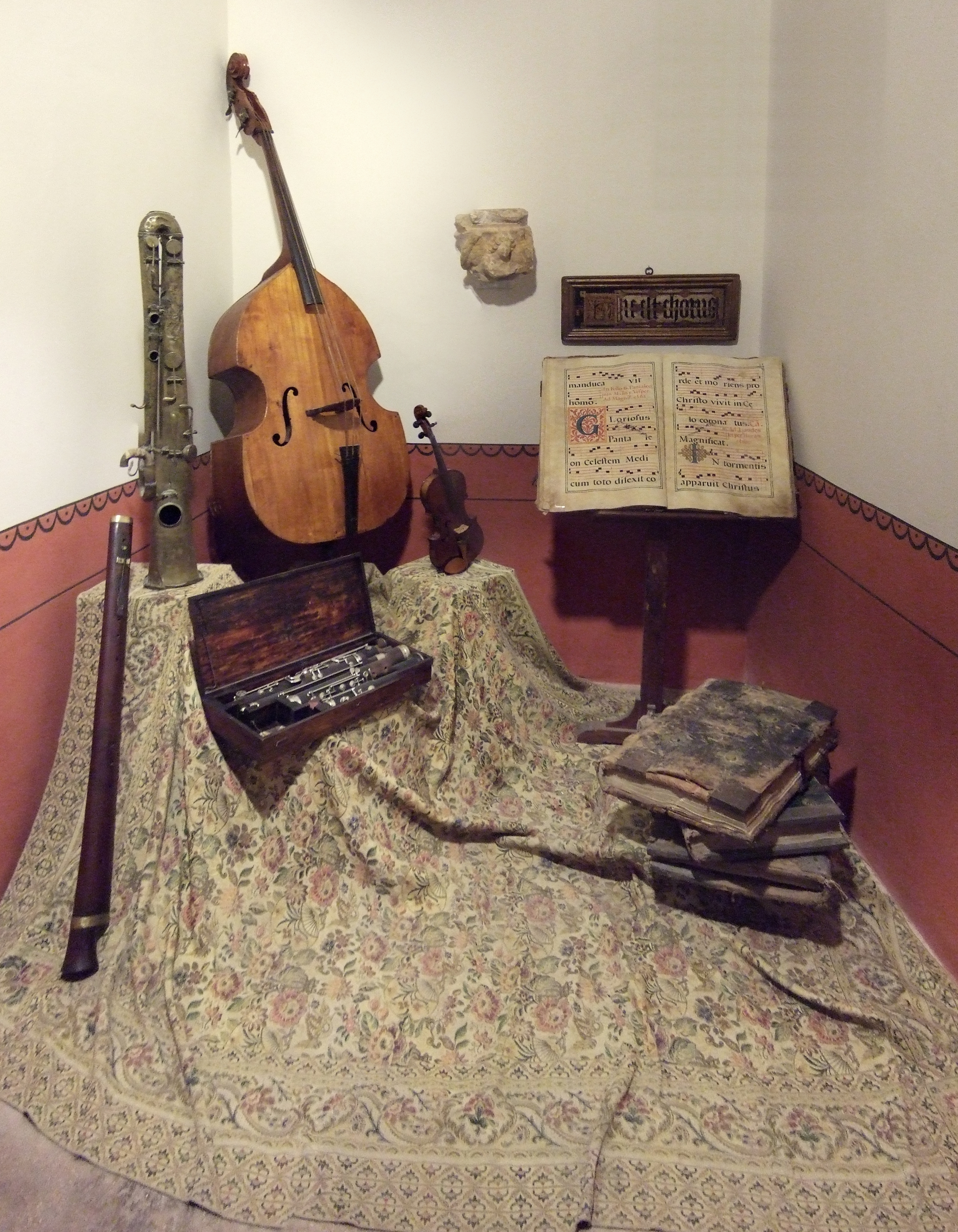
Musical instruments in the Diocesan Museum of Albarracín

Throughout its history, the Iberian Peninsula has received musical influences from around the Mediterranean Sea and across Europe. In the two centuries before the Christian era, Roman rule introduced the music and ideas of Ancient Greece. Early Christians, who had their own differing versions of church music, arrived during the height of the Roman Empire. The Visigoths, a Romanized Germanic people, took control of the peninsula following the fall of the Roman Empire, and later the Moors and Jews arrived in the Middle Ages.

These more than two thousand years of internal and external influences produced a large number of unique musical traditions that continue to shape Spanish music today.

== Medieval period (6th–14th centuries) ==
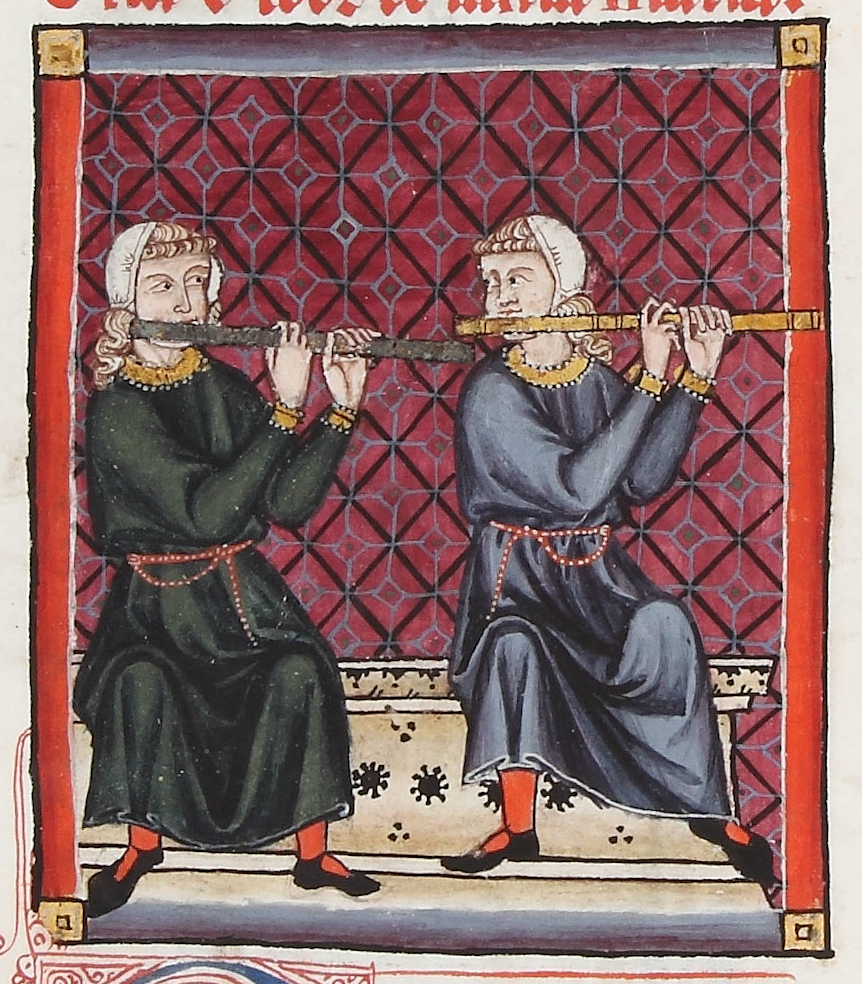
Cantigas de Santa María, medieval Spain

Isidore of Seville, the prolific 7th-century scholar, wrote extensively about music theory and practice in his encyclopedic work Etymologiae, providing valuable documentation of musical customs in Visigothic Spain.

Among the early Muslim rulers of Al-Andalus, music was generally tolerated and often encouraged. Abd al-Rahman I and Abd ar-Rahman II both kept singers and musicians at court, primarily brought over from the Arabian peninsula or the Levant. The most notable of these early Umayyad musicians was Ziryab, a lute player and singer whose method of teaching singing became widely influential in the region. This royal patronage extended to the nobility, who held concerts in their homes and procured musical entertainment for social events.

While some later monarchs such as Abd ar-Rahman III and Al-Hakam I were more austere, Almanzor revived musical patronage in the 10th century. During his reign, the education of noble girls included learning instruments such as the lute, rabel, manucordio, and organ. Court orchestras could be substantial—one in the reign of Muhammad II of Córdoba reportedly had "a hundred lutes and a hundred flutes". The Taifa of Seville was particularly notable for its musical culture, with ruler Al-Mu'tamid ibn Abbad being a musician himself.

Court music originally drew from Arabian and Levantine forms, but over time a distinctive Iberian style evolved, featuring the zejel and muwashah lyric patterns that also appear in Spanish poetry. These 'eastern' styles were also adopted by common people, who combined them with regional traditions.

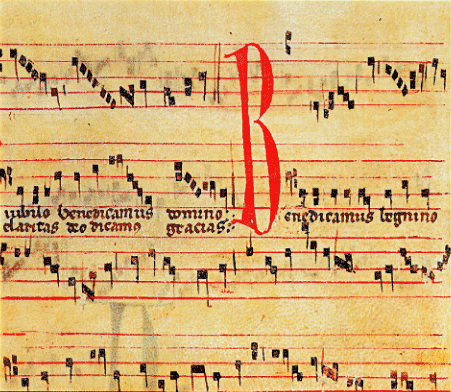
Codex Las Huelgas, a medieval Spanish music manuscript, circa 1300 AD

Muslim rulers were usually relatively tolerant of Christianity and Judaism, especially during the first three centuries of their presence, allowing Christian and Jewish music to flourish. Music notation was developed in Spain as early as the 8th century (the so-called Visigothic neumes) to notate sacred music of the Christian church, though this obscure notation has not yet been fully deciphered.

The music of the early medieval Christian church in Spain is known as the "Mozarabic Chant", which developed in isolation prior to the Islamic invasion and was not subject to the Papacy's enforcement of Gregorian chant. As the Christian reconquista progressed, these chants were almost entirely replaced by the Gregorian standard. Meanwhile, earlier musical folk styles from the pre-Islamic period continued in the countryside, in the same way as the Mozarabic Chant persisted in the churches.

In the royal Christian courts of the reconquistors, music like the Cantigas de Santa Maria reflected Moorish influences. Other important medieval sources include the Codex Calixtinus from Santiago de Compostela, the Codex Las Huelgas from Burgos, and the Llibre Vermell de Montserrat, a 14th-century devotional collection containing pilgrim songs and dances.

== Renaissance and Baroque periods ==
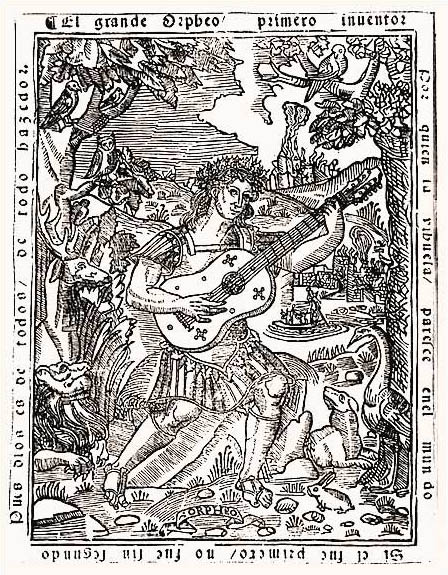
Orpheus playing the vihuela. Frontispiece from the famous work El maestro by Luis de Milán, 1536.

In the early Renaissance, Mateo Flecha el Viejo and the Castilian dramatist Juan del Encina ranked among the main composers in the post-Ars Nova period. Renaissance song books included the Cancionero de Palacio, the Cancionero de Medinaceli, the Cancionero de Upsala (kept in Carolina Rediviva library), the Cancionero de la Colombina, and the later Cancionero de la Sablonara. The organist Antonio de Cabezón stands out for his keyboard compositions and mastery.

An early 16th-century polyphonic vocal style developed in Spain was closely related to that of the Franco-Flemish composers. Merging of these styles occurred during the period when the Holy Roman Empire and the Burgundy were part of the dominions under Charles I (king of Spain from 1516 to 1556), since composers from the North of Europe visited Spain, and native Spaniards traveled within the empire, which extended to the Netherlands, Germany and Italy.

Music composed for the vihuela by Luis de Milán, Alonso Mudarra and Luis de Narváez was one of the main achievements of the period. The Aragonese Gaspar Sanz authored the first learning method for guitar.

Spanish composers of the Renaissance included Francisco Guerrero, Cristóbal de Morales, and Tomás Luis de Victoria (late Renaissance period), all of whom spent a significant portion of their careers in Rome. Victoria was recognized by contemporaries as having reached a level of polyphonic perfection and expressive intensity comparable to Palestrina and Lassus. Most Spanish composers returned home from travels abroad late in their careers to spread their musical knowledge in their native land, or in the late 16th century to serve at the Court of Philip II.

== 18th to 19th centuries ==
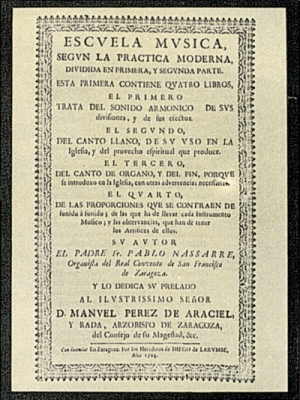
Front cover of book: Escuela Música según la práctica moderna published in 1723–1724

Antonio Soler's Sonata No. 84, an example of Classical era music in Spain

By the end of the 17th century, the "classical" musical culture of Spain had entered a period of decline, and would remain that way until the 19th century. Classicism in Spain, when it arrived, was inspired by Italian models, as in the works of Antonio Soler. Some outstanding Italian composers such as Domenico Scarlatti and Luigi Boccherini were appointed to the Madrid royal court, bringing Italian musical sensibilities to Spanish audiences. The short-lived Juan Crisóstomo Arriaga is credited as the main beginner of Romantic sinfonism in Spain.

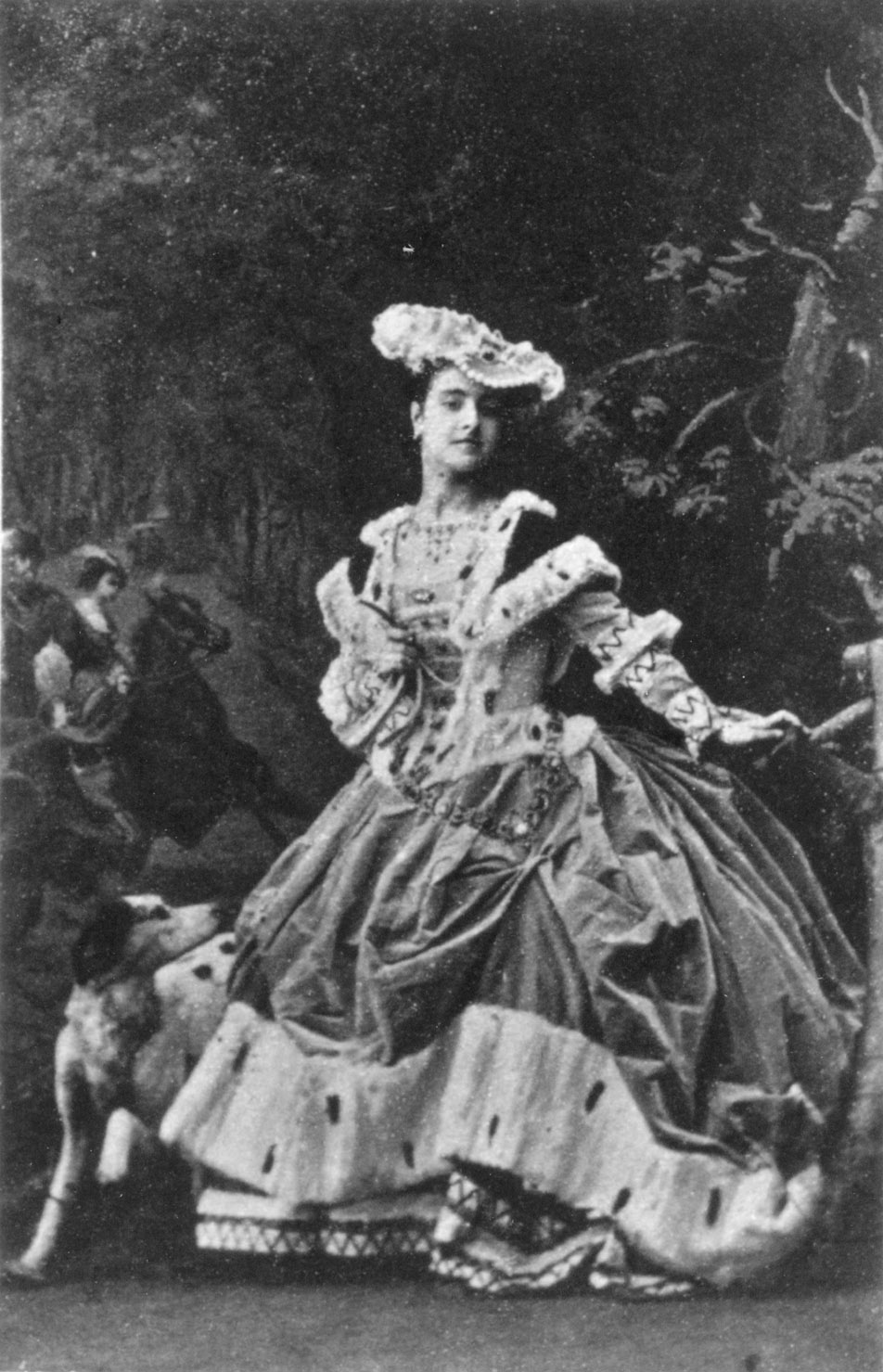
Adelina Patti as Lady Harriet in 'Martha' by Flotow, Camille Silvy

Zarzuela, a native form of opera that includes spoken dialogue, is a secular musical genre which developed in the mid-17th century, flourishing most importantly in the century after 1850. Francisco Asenjo Barbieri was a key figure in the development of the romantic zarzuela; whilst later composers such as Ruperto Chapí, Federico Chueca and Tomás Bretón brought the genre to its late 19th-century apogee. Leading 20th-century zarzuela composers included Pablo Sorozábal and Federico Moreno Torroba. Due to the genre's popularity, many 19th-century composers wrote in the style.

Fernando Sor, Dionisio Aguado, Francisco Tárrega and Miguel Llobet are known as composers of guitar music. Fine literature for violin was created by Pablo Sarasate and Jesús de Monasterio.

Musical creativity mainly moved into areas of popular music until the nationalist revival of the late Romantic era. Spanish composers of this period included Felipe Pedrell, Isaac Albéniz, Enrique Granados, Joaquín Turina, Manuel de Falla, Jesús Guridi, Ernesto Halffter, Federico Mompou, Salvador Bacarisse, and Joaquín Rodrigo.

== 20th century ==
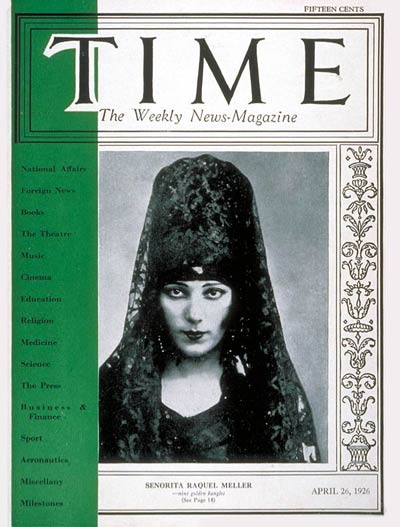
Raquel Meller, a Spanish singer and actress, featured on the cover of Time magazine on 26 April 1926

By the early 20th century, Spanish music was largely divorced from the intellectual sphere, an ongoing trend since the 18th century, and thus the literary movements of the period largely lacked overlap with musicians. However, the two spheres had begun to collaborate again by the beginning of the Spanish Civil War.

Opera in Spain struggled in the 20th century, with many theatres closing, including the Teatro Real. However, orchestral music gained more opportunities, with the establishment of the Orquesta Sinfónica de Madrid, the Sociedad Filarmónica de Madrid, and the Barcelona Symphony Orchestra in the 1900s and 1910s. Choral music saw a similar boost, with the establishment of permanent choirs across the country, and chamber music secured a place in the country with a number of quartets. The Madrid and Barcelona conservatories were "lively centers of musical life".

=== Franco era ===
During the 1940s and 1950s, Spanish music was shaped by the aftermath of the Civil War and Francisco Franco's dictatorship. The regime used censorship as a tool to control cultural expression, with the Falangist Vice-Secretariat of Popular Education banning the broadcasting of "so-called black music, swing dances, or any other kind of compositions whose lyrics are in a foreign language".

Traditional genres like flamenco and classical music continued under the regime, though flamenco was at times restricted from public display. Popular music forms such as zarzuela and pasodoble remained prominent during this period. The regime's musical censorship was controlled by two agencies: the Directorate General of Popular Culture and the Directorate General of Radio and Television, which operated between 1960 and 1977 and classified approximately 4,000 songs as unfit for broadcast.

=== Benidorm Song Festival ===
Despite strict censorship and limited outlets for contemporary music, the Benidorm International Song Festival, established in 1959, provided an important platform for Spanish musicians. The contest, modeled on Italy's San Remo Music Festival, was created to promote Benidorm and Spanish music. During the festival's peak years from 1959 to 1971, it featured emerging personalities of Spanish light song, including Dúo Dinámico, Raphael, Bruno Lomas, and Julio Iglesias, who won in 1968 with "La vida sigue igual".

=== Yé-yé ===
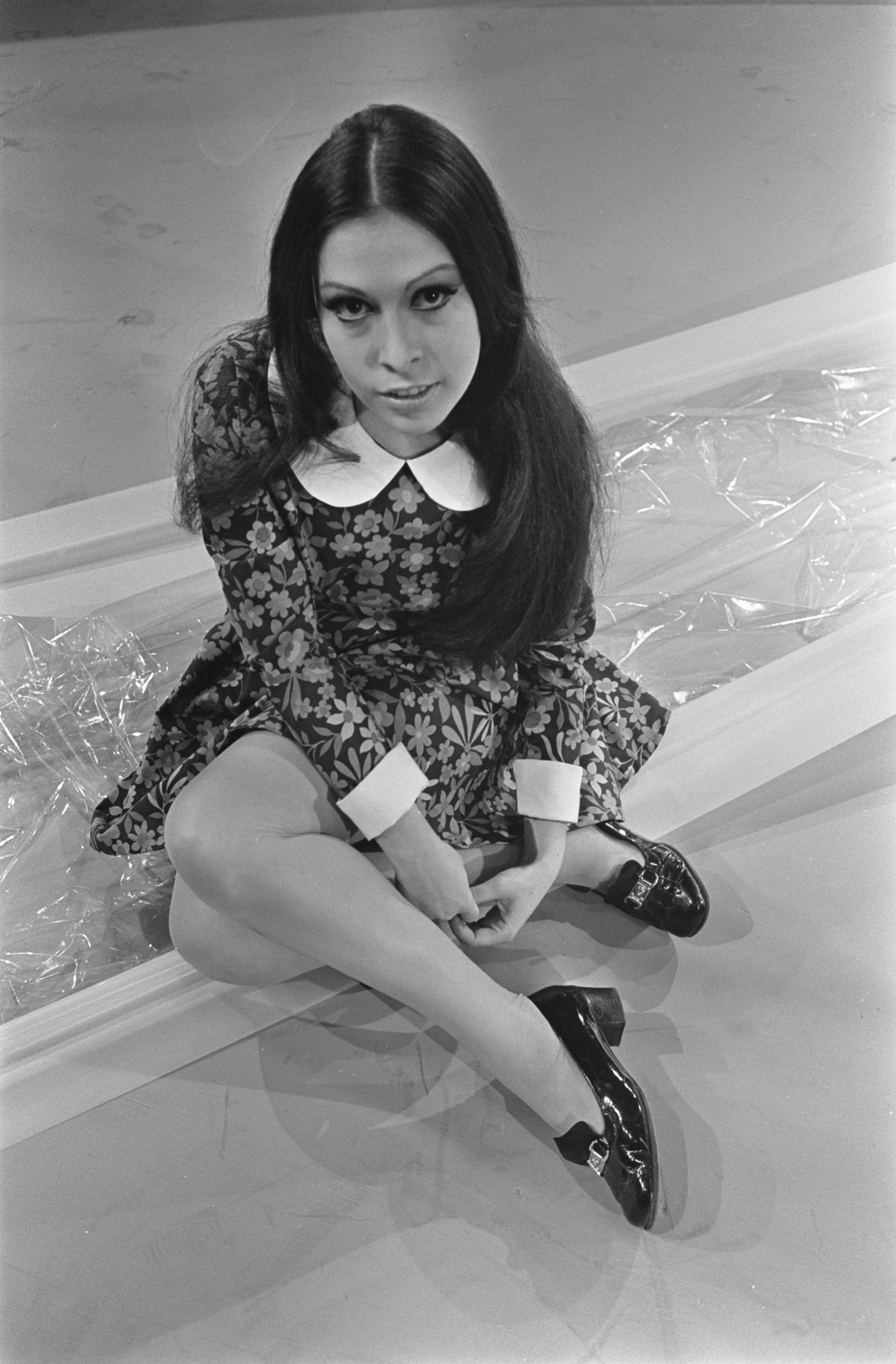
Massiel, a Spanish singer known for her contribution to the yé-yé movement and for winning the 1968 Eurovision Song Contest with the song "La, la, la"

The yé-yé movement, which took its name from the English pop-refrain "yeah-yeah", originated in France and spread to Spain during the mid-1960s. The musical style combined Anglo-American influences with traditional European pop forms, featuring catchy, upbeat melodies and simple, danceable rhythms.

The performers were often young female singers, known as "chicas yéyé" in Spain, who became popular idols. In 1965, the Spanish comedy film Historias de la Televisión was released, featuring the song "Chica Yeyé" performed by Concha Velasco. The song rose to number one on the Spanish music charts, achieving widespread popularity and becoming one of the most recognizable songs in Spain. Karina was regarded as "Queen of Spanish yé-yé" with hits including "En un mundo nuevo" and "El baúl de los recuerdos".

In 1968, Massiel won the Eurovision Song Contest with "La, la, la", a significant cultural milestone that placed Spanish pop music on the European stage. Other notable Spanish yé-yé artists include Marisol, Rocío Dúrcal, Ana Belén, and Gelu.

Flamenco Singers

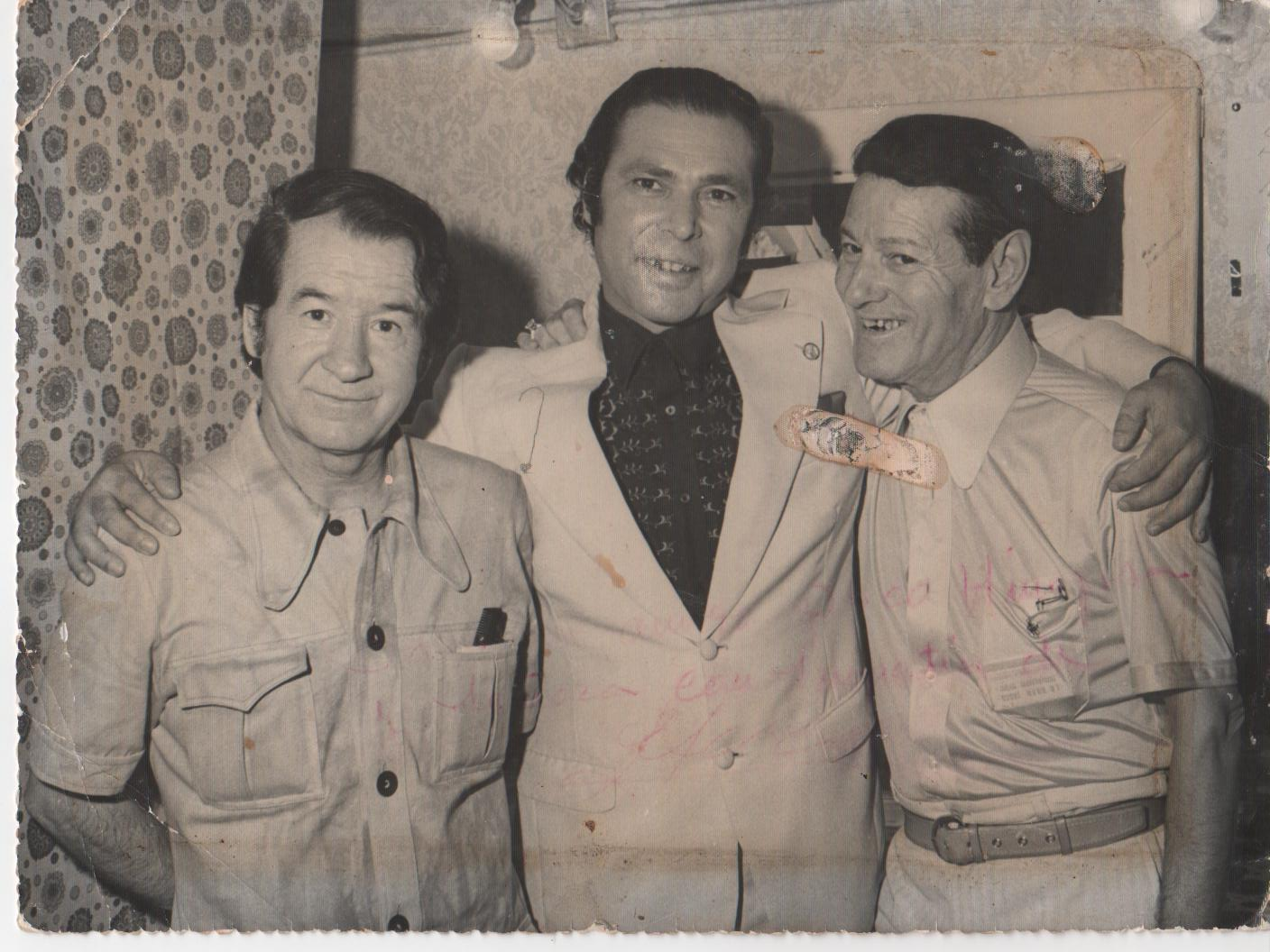
Juanito Valderrama

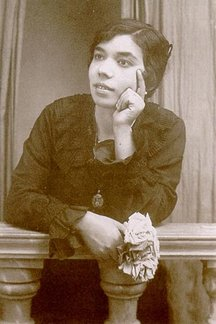
La Niña de los Peines

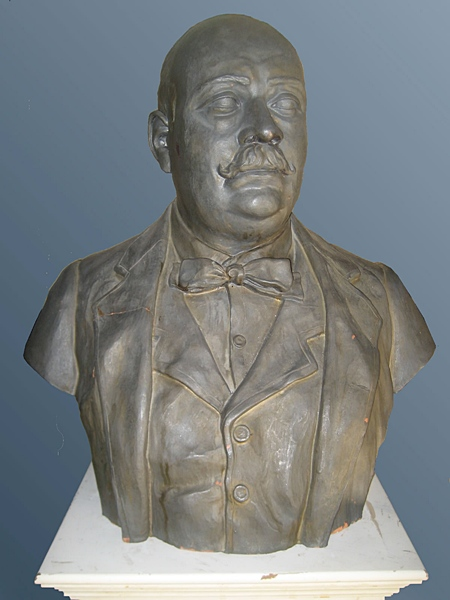
Antonio Chacón

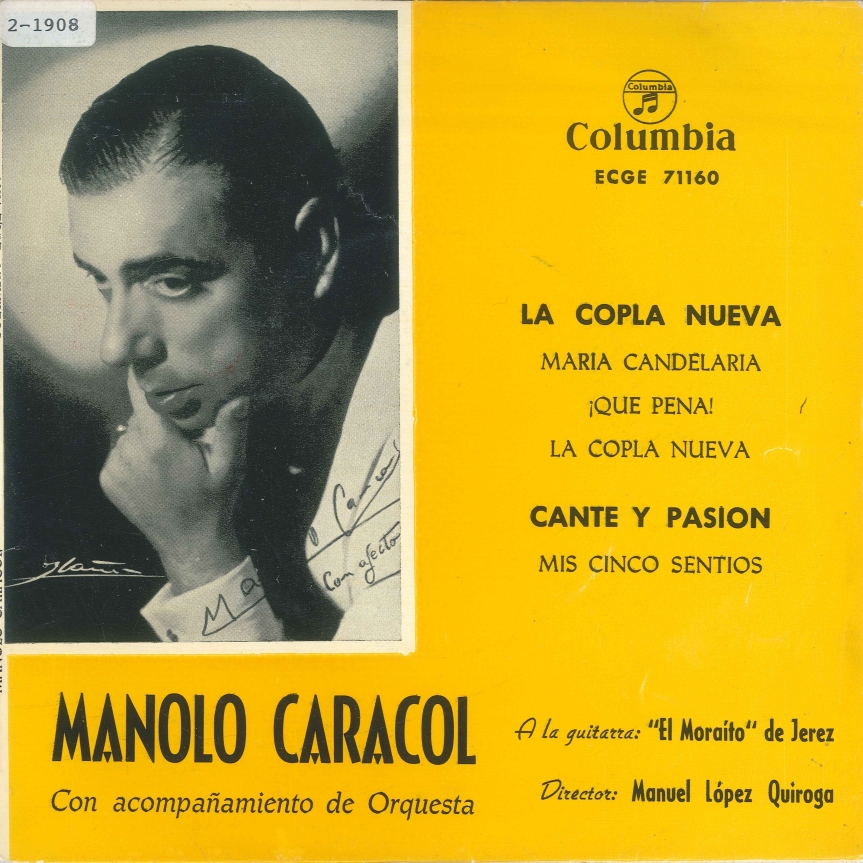
Manolo Caracol

== Performers ==
Copla Singers

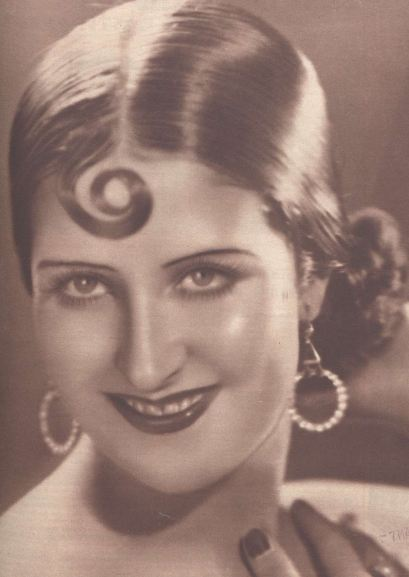
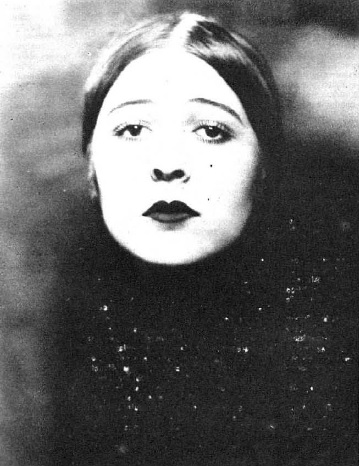

Estrellita Castro and Concha Piquer, pioneers of the Spanish copla genre

Spain has over forty professional orchestras, including the Orquestra Simfònica de Barcelona, Orquesta Nacional de España, and the Orquesta Sinfónica de Madrid.

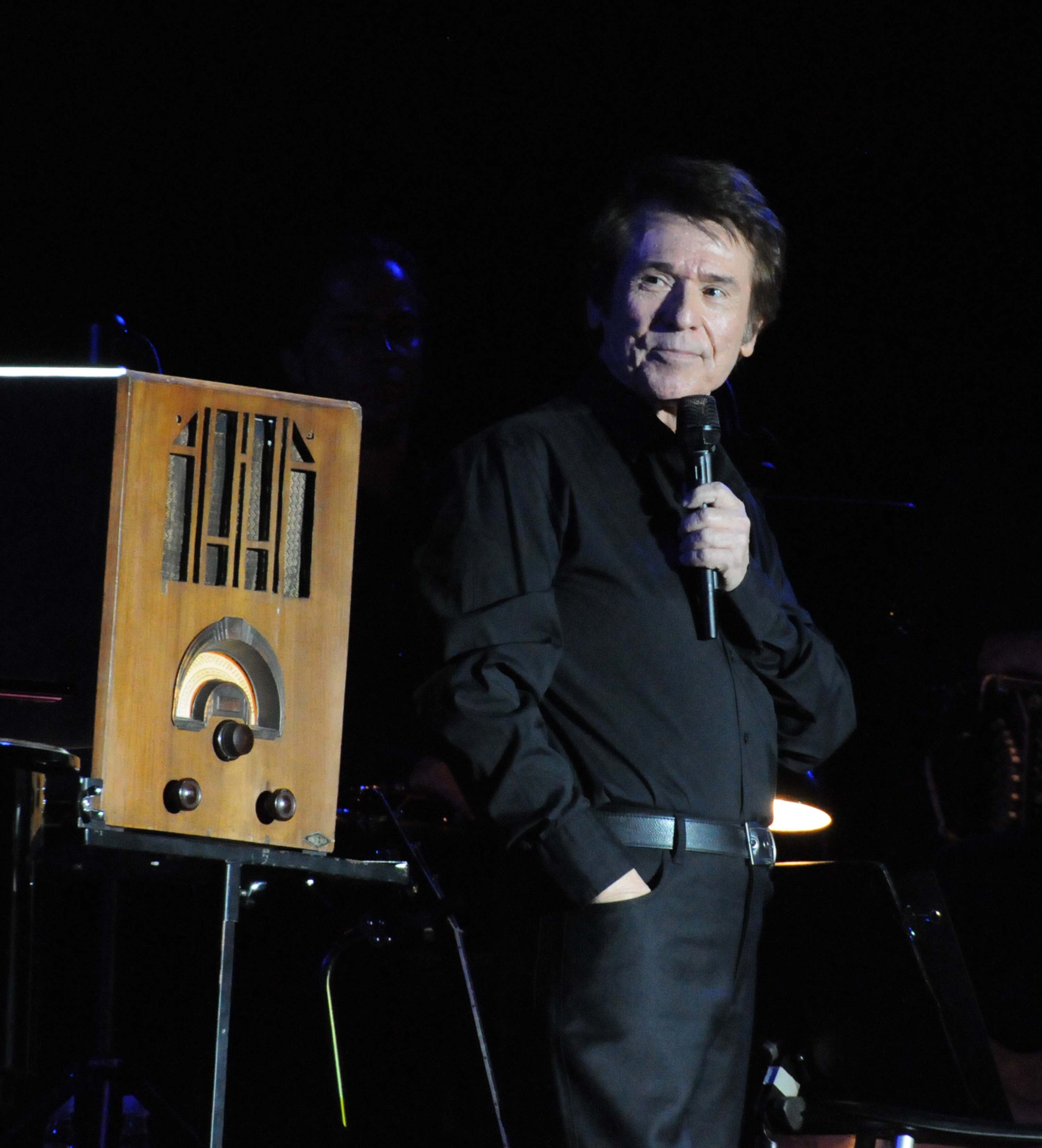
Raphael, recognized for his vocal range and stage presence

Spain also has a number of opera houses, including the Teatro Real, the Gran Teatre del Liceu, Teatro Arriaga, and the El Palau de les Arts Reina Sofía.

Zarzuela and Classical-Inspired Singers

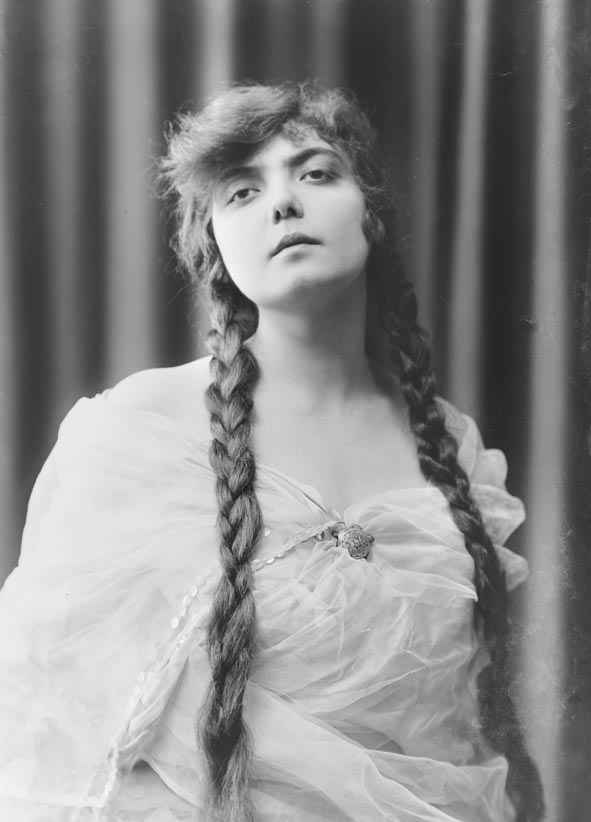
Conchita Supervía

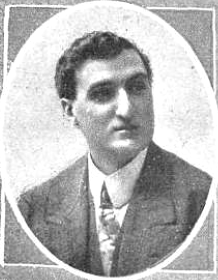
Emilio Sagi Barba

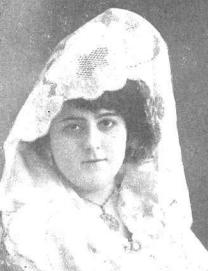
Ofelia Nieto

== Popular music ==
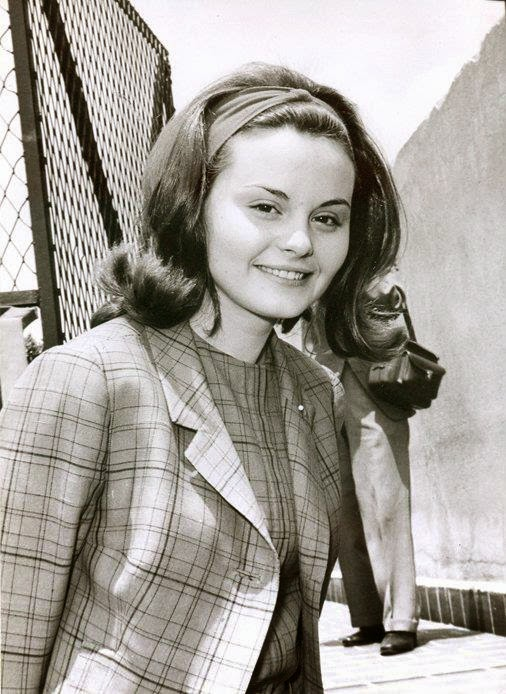
Rocío Dúrcal, one of the best-selling Spanish-speaking female artists in music history

Spanish pop music developed during the years of Francisco Franco's regime, which presented challenges for artists seeking to explore contemporary styles. During the 1960s and early 1970s, tourism brought additional musical styles from elsewhere in Europe and abroad.

The regime's restrictions on women's roles in public life created barriers for female musicians. Nevertheless, some achieved considerable success, such as Marisol, who began her career as a child star in the 1960s, and Rocío Dúrcal, who became a prominent figure in Spanish music and film.

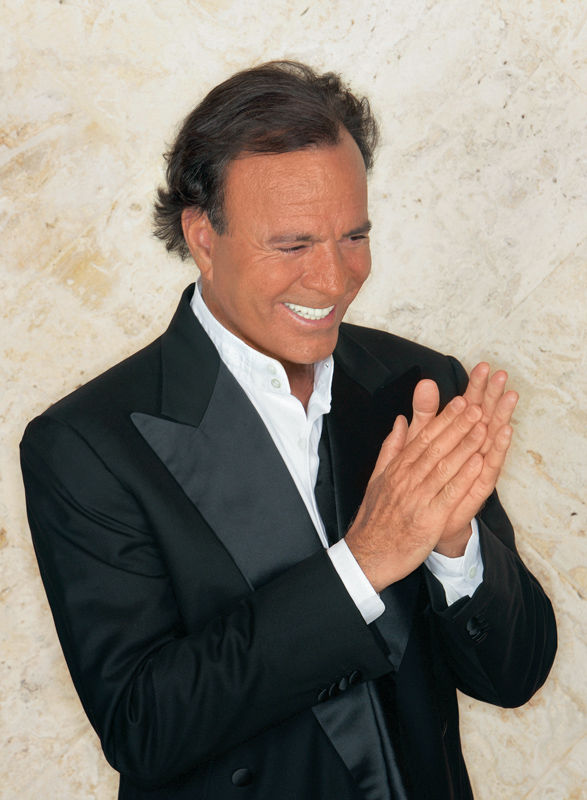
Julio Iglesias, the best-selling Latin music artist in history

=== La Movida Madrileña ===
Following Franco's death in 1975, the 1980s brought La Movida Madrileña, a countercultural movement centered in Madrid. The movement coincided with economic growth in Spain and a widespread desire for the development of a post-Francoist identity. The "Concierto homenaje a Canito" (Canito Memorial Concert), which took place on 9 February 1980, is traditionally considered the beginning of La Movida Madrileña.

La Movida featured a rise in punk rock and synth-pop music, drawing influence from new wave, Germany's Neue Deutsche Welle, and the British New Romantic movement. Notable artists included Kaka de Luxe, Radio Futura, Nacha Pop, Gabinete Caligari, and Los Secretos. Two popular bands were Mecano and Alaska y los Pegamoides.

Female artists such as Alaska (of Alaska y los Pegamoides and later Fangoria) became cultural icons during this period. Alaska was one of the founding members of La Movida and participated in several music groups including Kaka de Luxe (1977), Alaska y los Pegamoides (1980), Alaska y Dinarama (1983), and since 1989, the electronic band Fangoria. Film director Pedro Almodóvar had a significant influence on the Movida with his films, and remains its most internationally famous participant.

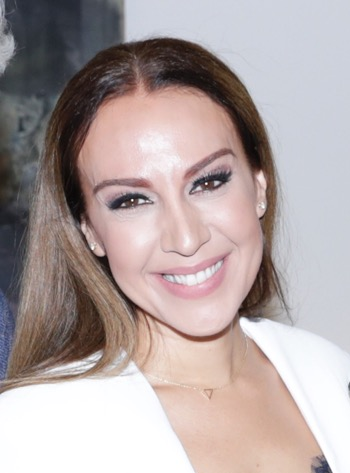
Mónica Naranjo rose to fame in the 1990s with hits like "Sola" and "Sobreviviré".

=== 1990s and beyond ===
The 1990s were characterized by a vibrant underground music scene in major cities like Madrid and Barcelona. Alternative rock bands such as Los Planetas and Dover gained prominence.

Los Planetas, an indie rock group from Granada formed in 1993, became one of the flagship artists of the 1990s alternative movement in Spain. Their 1998 album Una semana en el motor de un autobús earned them critical acclaim, and was named best album of 1998 by the Spanish music magazine Rockdelux. Dover, formed in 1992, gained international recognition with their 1997 album Devil Came to Me, which sold over 500,000 copies and won the band the Ondas Award for best Spanish group revelation. Electronic music and dance clubs further diversified the musical landscape during this period.

=== International success ===
Julio Iglesias, Enrique Iglesias, Rosalía and Alejandro Sanz represent Spanish pop music's international reach. Julio Iglesias achieved unprecedented success as the best-selling male Latin artist of all time.

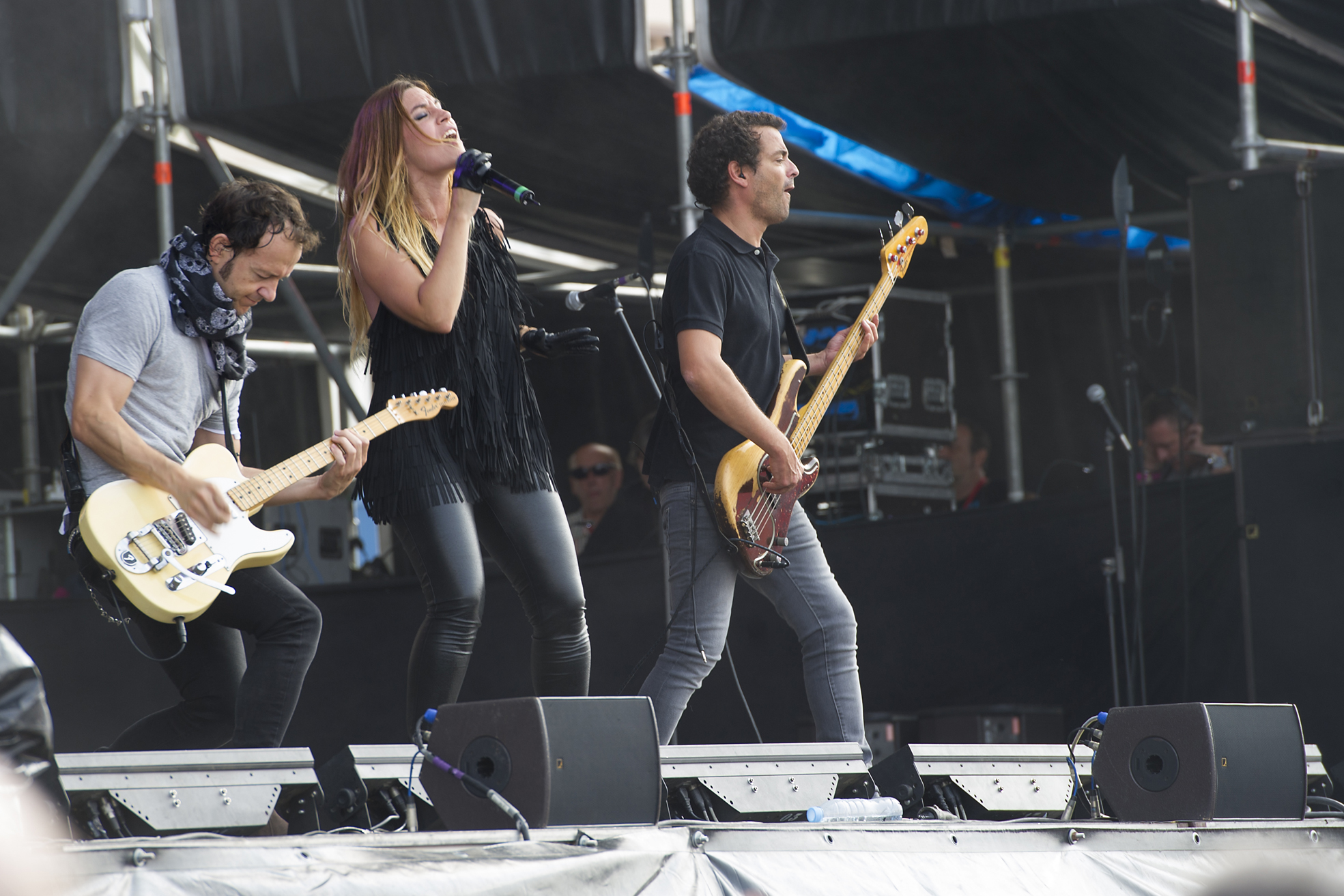
La Oreja de Van Gogh have sold more than 8 million albums worldwide since their debut.

Enrique Iglesias and Alejandro Sanz have won major international music awards including the Grammy Award.

Rosalía is currently the biggest female popstar of Spain. She won a Grammy Award in 2020 for her album “El Mal Querer” and is the first ever Spanish artist to win Best International Artist at the BRIT Awards. She has collaborated with many artists like Billie Eilish, Travis Scott, The Weeknd, Bad Bunny, Björk and many more.

=== Crossover with Latin American markets ===
As Spanish is commonly spoken in Spain and most of Latin America, music from both regions has been able to cross over. According to the Sociedad General de Autores y Editores (SGAE), Spain is the largest Latino music market in the world.

As a result, the Latin music industry encompasses Spanish-language music from Spain. The Latin Academy of Recording Arts & Sciences, the organization responsible for the Latin Grammy Awards, includes music from Spain, with a category for Best Flamenco Album and voting members living in the country.

== Music by region ==
The regions of Spain have distinctive musical traditions. There is also a movement of singer-songwriters with politically active lyrics, paralleling similar developments in Latin America and Portugal. The singer and composer Eliseo Parra (b 1949) has recorded traditional folk music from the Basque country and Castile as well as his own compositions inspired from the musical styles of Spain and abroad.

=== Andalusia ===
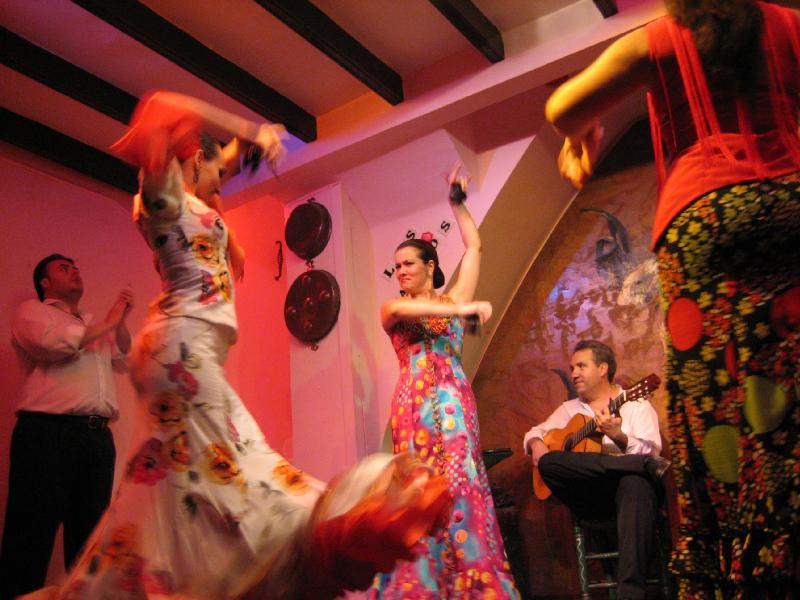
Flamenco dancing in Seville

Though Andalusia is best known for flamenco music, there is also a tradition of gaita rociera (tabor pipe) music in western Andalusia and a distinct violin and plucked-string type of band music known as panda de verdiales in Málaga.

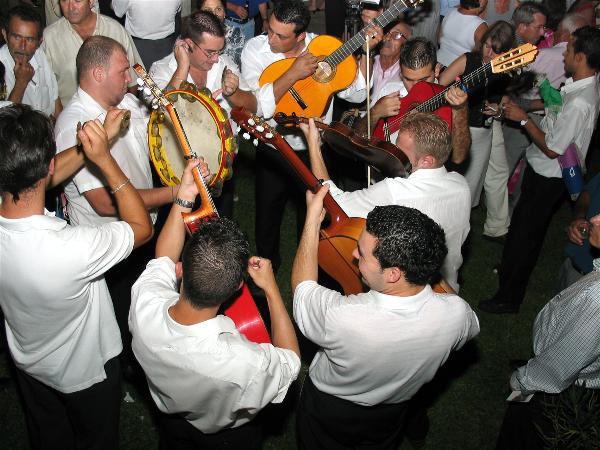
Panda de Verdiales in Málaga

Sevillanas is related to flamenco and most flamenco performers have at least one classic sevillana in their repertoire. The style originated as a medieval Castilian dance, called the seguidilla, which was adopted with a flamenco style in the 19th century. Today, this lively couples' dance is popular in most parts of Spain, though the dance is often associated with the city of Seville's famous Easter feria.

The region has also produced singer-songwriters like Javier Ruibal and Carlos Cano, who revived a traditional music called copla. Catalan Kiko Veneno and Joaquín Sabina are popular performers in a distinctly Spanish-style rock music, while Sephardic musicians like Aurora Moreno, Luís Delgado and Rosa Zaragoza keep Andalusian Sephardic music alive.

=== Aragon ===
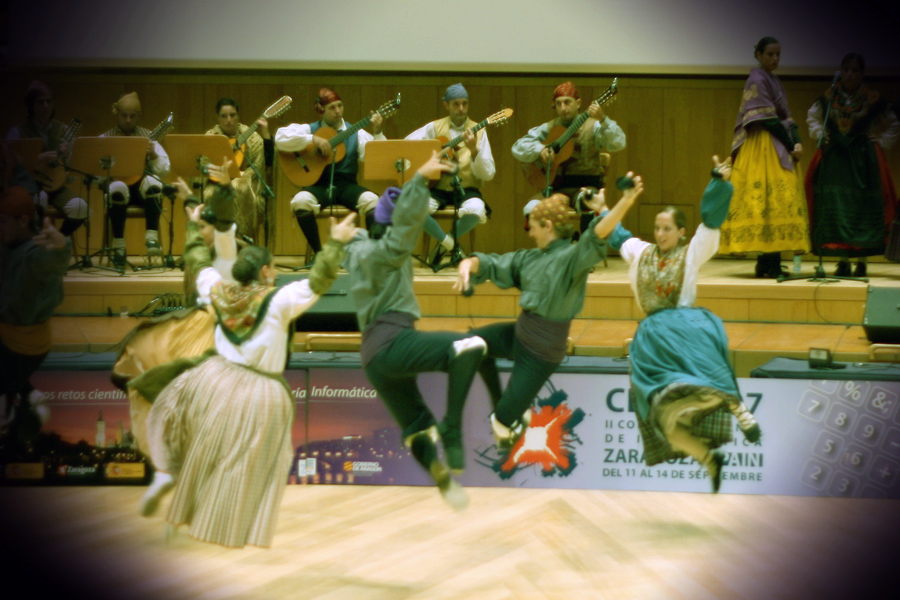
Aragonese jota dancing.

Jota, popular across Spain, might have its historical roots in the southern part of Aragon. Jota instruments include the castanets, guitar, bandurria, tambourines and sometimes the flute. The guitarro, a unique kind of small guitar also seen in Murcia, seems Aragonese in origin.

Besides its music for stick-dances and dulzaina (shawm), Aragon has its own gaita de boto (bagpipes) and chiflo (tabor pipe). As in the Basque country, Aragonese chiflo can be played along to a chicotén string-drum (psaltery) rhythm.

=== Asturias, Cantabria and Galicia ===
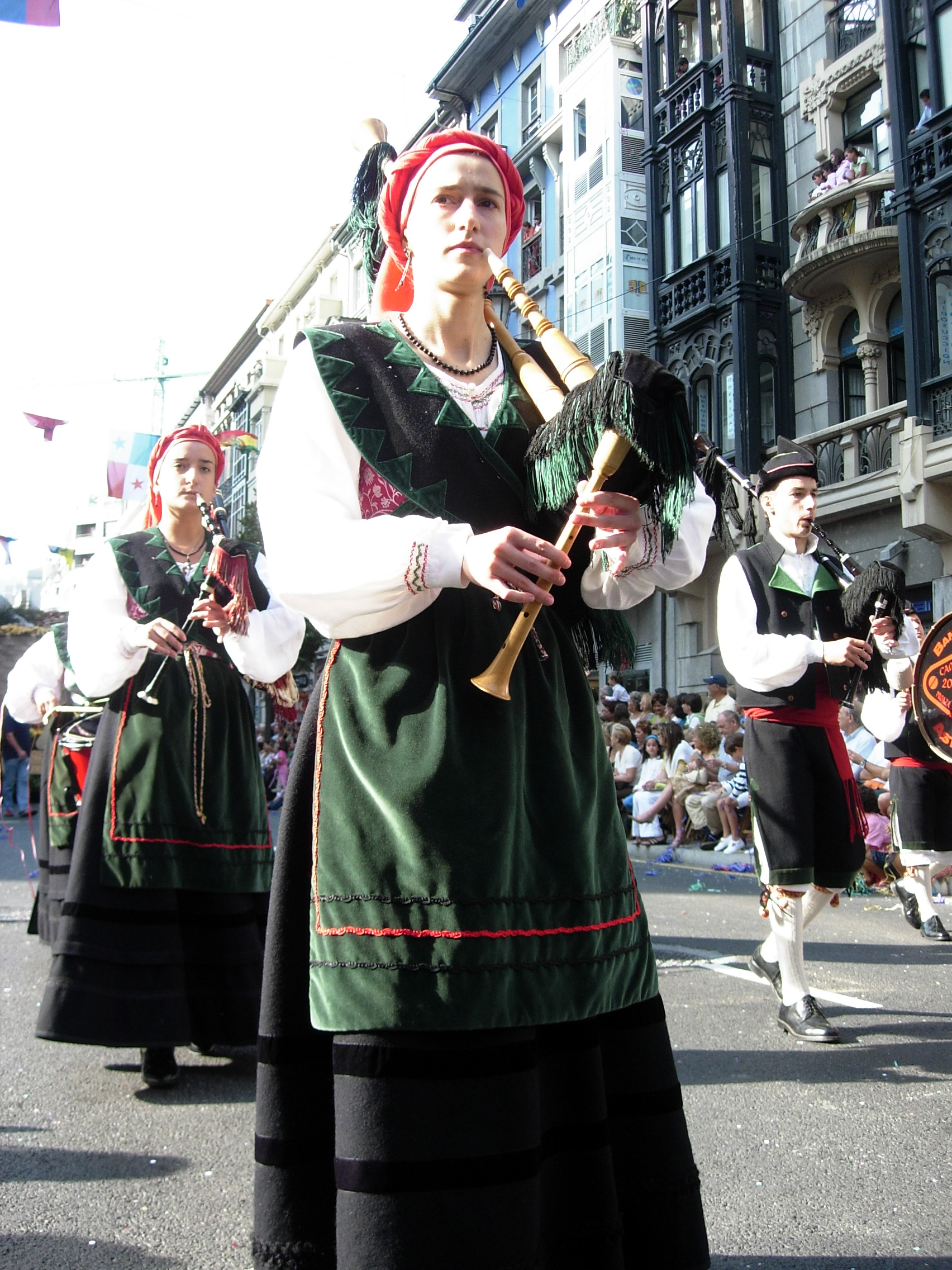
Asturian gaiteros (bagpipe players)

Northwest Spain (Asturias, Galicia and Cantabria) is home to a distinct musical tradition extending back into the Middle Ages. The signature instrument of the region is the gaita (bagpipe). The gaita is often accompanied by a snare drum, called the tamboril, and is played in processional marches.

Other instruments include the requinta, a kind of fife, as well as harps, fiddles, rebec and zanfona (hurdy-gurdy). The music itself runs the gamut from uptempo muiñeiras to stately marches. As in the Basque Country, Cantabrian music also features intricate arch and stick dances but the tabor pipe does not play as an important role as it does in Basque music.

Traditionally, Galician music included a type of chanting song known as alalas. Alalas may include instrumental interludes, and were believed to have a very long history, based on legends.

There are local festivals of which Ortigueira's Festival Internacional do Mundo Celta is especially important. Drum and bagpipe couples range among the most beloved kinds of Galician music, that also includes popular bands like Milladoiro. Pandereteiras are traditional groups of women that play tambourines and sing - bands like Tanxugueiras are directly influenced by this tradition. The bagpipe virtuosos Carlos Núñez and Susana Seivane are especially popular performers.

Asturias is also home to popular musicians such as José Ángel Hevia (bagpiper) and the group Llan de cubel. Circular dances using a 6/8 tambourine rhythm are a hallmark of this area. Vocal asturianadas show melismatic ornamentations similar to those of other parts of the Iberian Peninsula. There are many festivals, such as "Folixa na Primavera" (April, in Mieres), "Intercelticu d'Avilés" (Interceltic festival of Avilés, in July), as well as many "Celtic nights" in Asturias.

=== Balearic Islands ===
In the Balearic Islands, Xeremiers or colla de xeremiers are a traditional ensemble that consists of flabiol (a five-hole tabor pipe) and xeremias (bagpipes). Mallorca's Maria del Mar Bonet was one of the most influential artists of nova canço, known for her political and social lyrics. Tomeu Penya, Biel Majoral, Cerebros Exprimidos and Joan Bibiloni are also popular.

=== Basque Country ===
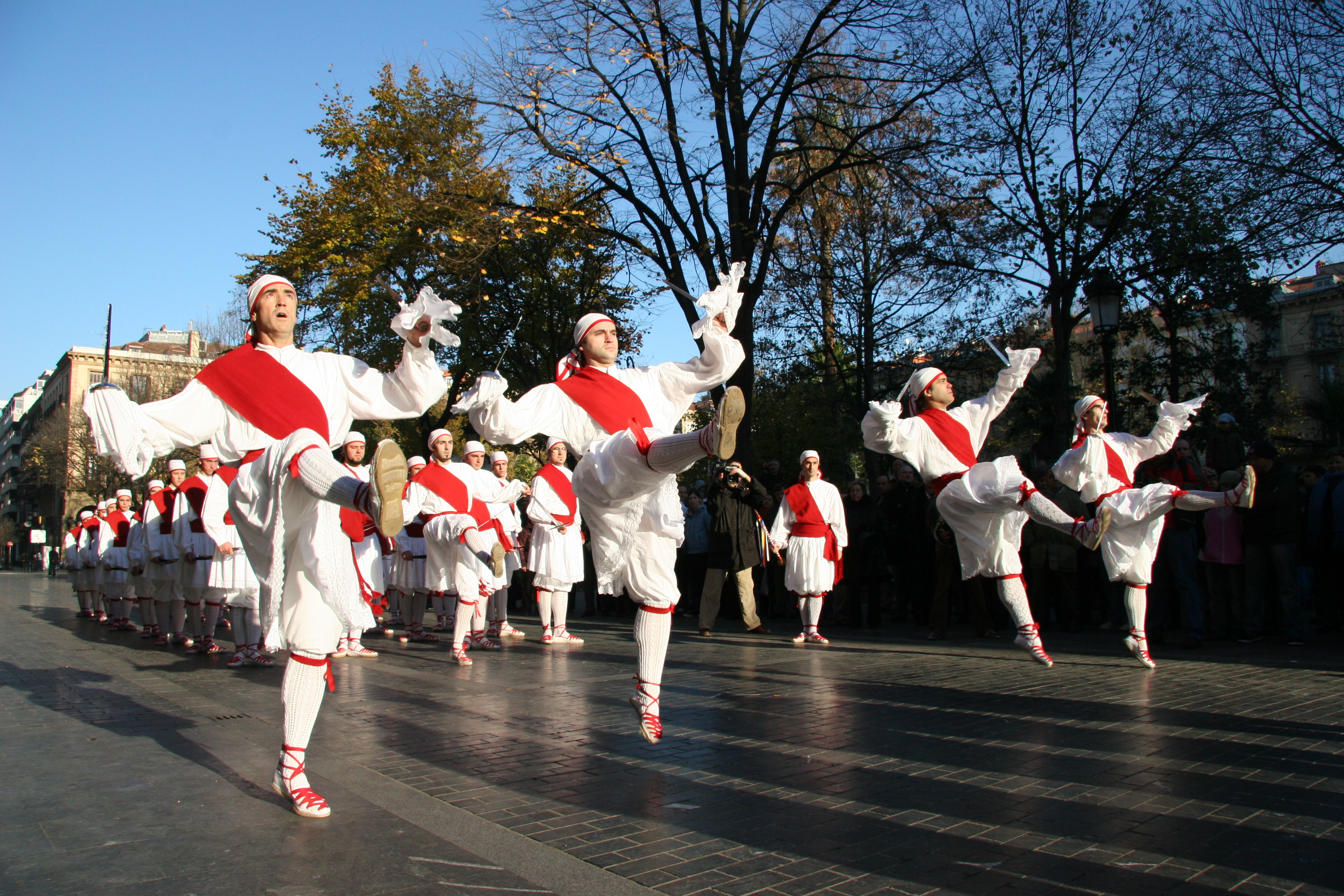
Ezpatadantza of the Basque Country

The most popular kind of Basque music is named after the dance trikitixa, which is based on the accordion and tambourine. Popular performers are Joseba Tapia and Kepa Junkera.

Highly appreciated folk instruments are the txistu (a tabor pipe similar to Occitanian galoubet recorder), alboka (a double clarinet played in circular-breathing technique, similar to other Mediterranean instruments like launeddas) and txalaparta (a huge xylophone, similar to the Romanian toacă and played by two performers). As in many parts of the Iberian peninsula, there are ritual dances with sticks, swords and arches made from vegetation. Other popular dances are the fandango, jota and 5/8 zortziko.

Basques on both sides of the Spanish-French border have been known for their singing since the Middle Ages, and a surge of Basque nationalism at the end of the 19th century led to the establishment of large Basque-language choirs that helped preserve their language and songs. Even during the persecution of the Francisco Franco era (1939–1975), when the Basque language was outlawed, traditional songs and dances were preserved in secret, and they continue to thrive despite the popularity of commercially marketed pop music.

=== Canary Islands ===
In the Canary Islands, Isa, a local kind of Jota, is now popular, and Latin American musical (Cuban) influences are quite widespread, especially with the charango (a kind of guitar). Timple, a local instrument which resembles ukulele / cavaquinho, is commonly seen in plucked-string bands.

A popular set on El Hierro island consists of drums and wooden fifes (pito herreño). The tabor pipe is customary in some ritual dances on the island of Tenerife.

=== Castile, Madrid and León ===
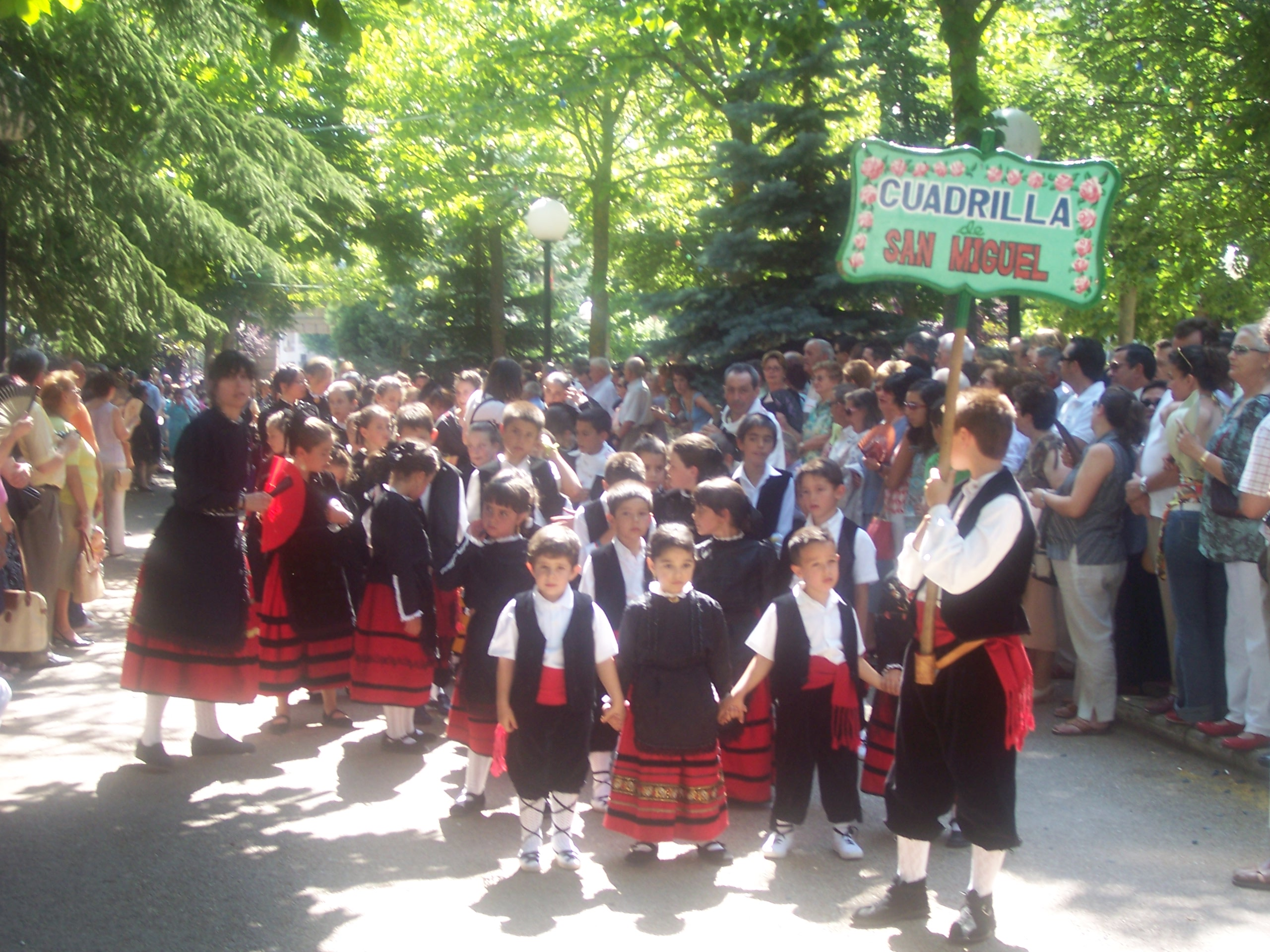
Children in Castilian folk costume in Soria, Castile

A large inland region, Castile, Madrid and Leon were Celtiberian country before its annexation and cultural latinization by the Roman Empire but it is extremely doubtful that anything from the musical traditions of the Celtic era have survived.

Ever since, the area has been a musical melting pot, including Roman, Visigothic, Jewish, Moorish, Italian, French and Roma influences, but the longstanding influences from the surrounding regions and Portugal continue to play an important role. Areas within Castile and León generally tend to have more musical affinity with neighboring regions than with more distant parts of the region. This has given the region diverse musical traditions.

Jota is popular, but is uniquely slow in Castile and León, unlike its more energetic Aragonese version. Instrumentation also varies much from the one in Aragon. Northern León, that shares a language relationship with a region in northern Portugal and the Spanish regions of Asturias and Galicia, also shares their musical influences. Here, the gaita (bagpipe) and tabor pipe playing traditions are prominent.

In most of Castile, there is a strong tradition of dance music for dulzaina (shawm) and rondalla groups. Popular rhythms include 5/8 charrada and circle dances, jota and habas verdes. As in many other parts of the Iberian peninsula, ritual dances include paloteos (stick dances).

Salamanca is known as the home of tuna, a serenade played with guitars and tambourines, mostly by students dressed in medieval clothing. Madrid is known for its chotis music, a local variation to the 19th-century schottische dance. Flamenco, although not considered native, is popular among some urbanites but is mainly confined to Madrid.

=== Catalonia ===
Though Catalonia is best known for sardana music played by a cobla, there are other traditional styles of dance music like ball de bastons (stick-dances), galops, ball de gitanes. Music is at the forefront in cercaviles and celebrations similar to Patum in Berga.

Flabiol (a five-hole tabor pipe), gralla or dolçaina (a shawm) and sac de gemecs (a local bagpipe) are traditional folk instruments that make part of some coblas.

Catalan gipsies and Andalusian immigrants to Catalonia created their own style of rumba called rumba catalana which is a popular style that's similar to flamenco, but not technically part of the flamenco canon. The rumba catalana originated in Barcelona when the rumba and other Afro-Cuban styles arrived from Cuba in the 19th and early 20th centuries. Catalan performers adapted them to the flamenco format and made it their own. Though often dismissed by aficionados as "fake" flamenco, rumba catalana remains popular.

The havaneres singers remain popular. Nowadays, young people cultivate Rock català popular music, as some years ago the Nova Cançó was relevant.

=== Extremadura ===
Having long been the poorest part of Spain, Extremadura is a largely rural region known for the Portuguese influence on its music. As in the northern regions of Spain, there is a rich repertoire for tabor pipe music.

The zambomba friction-drum (similar to Portuguese sarronca or Brazilian cuica) is played by pulling on a rope which is inside the drum. It is found throughout Spain. The jota is common, here played with triangles, castanets, guitars, tambourines, accordions and zambombas.

=== Murcia ===
Murcia is a region in the south-east of Spain which, historically, experienced considerable Moorish colonisation, is similar in many respects to its neighbour, Andalusia. The guitar-accompanied cante jondo Flamenco style is especially associated with Murcia as are rondallas, plucked-string bands.

Christian songs, such as the polyphonic chant of the Auroro singers, are traditionally sung a cappella, sometimes accompanied by the sound of church bells, and cuadrillas are festive songs primarily played during holidays, like Christmas.

=== Navarre and La Rioja ===
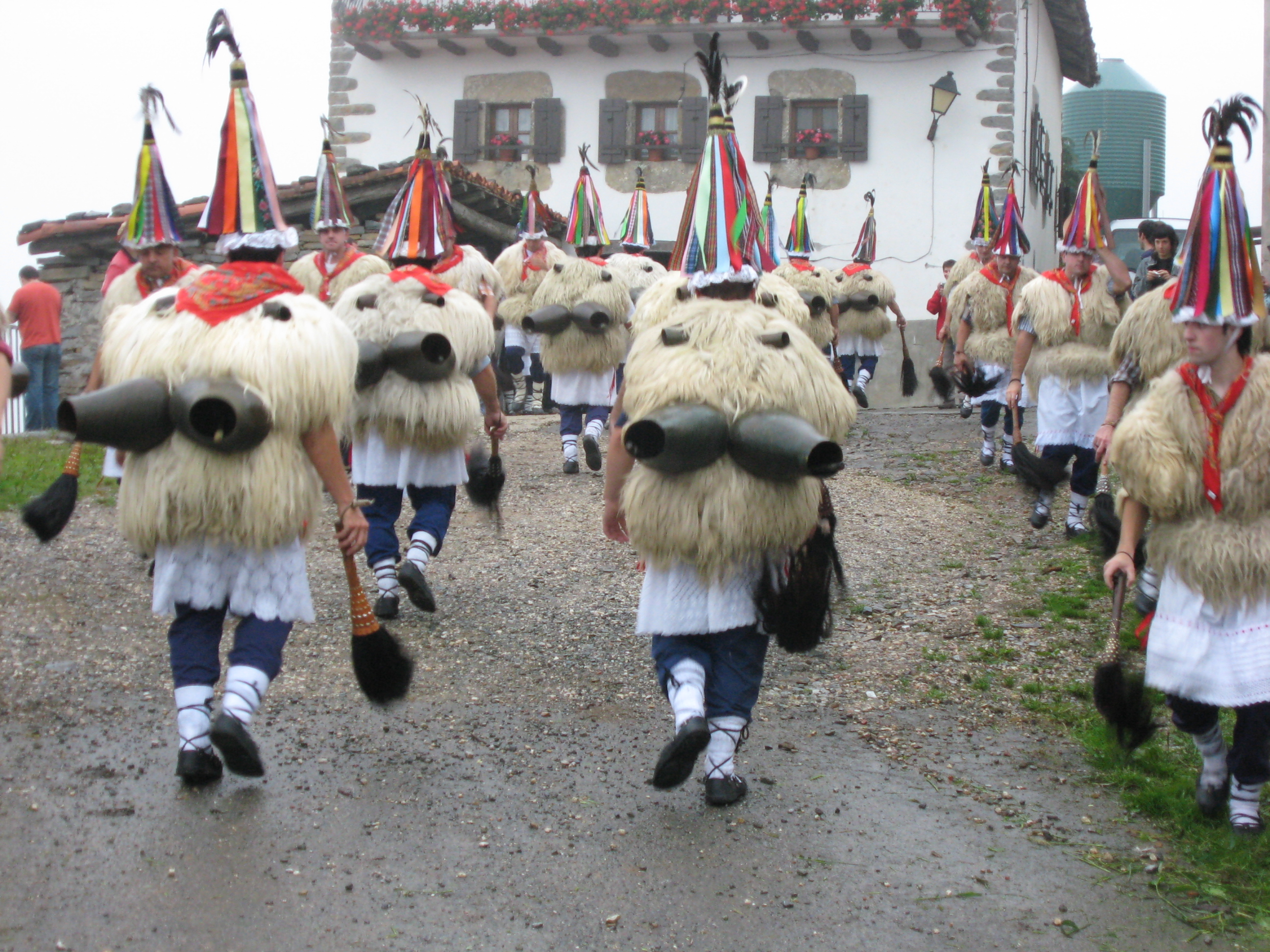
Ioaldunak dancers from the Basque region of Navarre, traditionally associated with the carnival celebrations of Ituren and Zubieta

Navarre and La Rioja are small northern regions with diverse cultural elements. Bordered by Aragon and the Basque Autonomous Community, they also share much of the music found in those two regions.

Northern Navarre is Basque in language, while the Southern section shares more Aragonese features. The jota genre is also known in both Navarre and La Rioja. Both regions have rich dance and dulzaina (shawm) traditions. Txistu (tabor pipe) and dulzaina ensembles are very popular in the public celebrations of Navarre.

=== Valencia ===
Traditional music from Valencia is characteristically Mediterranean in origin. Valencia also has its local kind of Jota. Moreover, Valencia has a high reputation for musical innovation, and performing brass bands called bandes are common, with one appearing in almost every town.

Dolçaina (shawm) is widely found. Valencia also shares some traditional dances with other Iberian areas, like for instance, the ball de bastons (stick-dances). The group Al Tall is also well-known, experimenting with the Berber band Muluk El Hwa, and revitalizing traditional Valencian music, following the Riproposta Italian musical movement.
