= Cuíca =

Brazilian friction drum

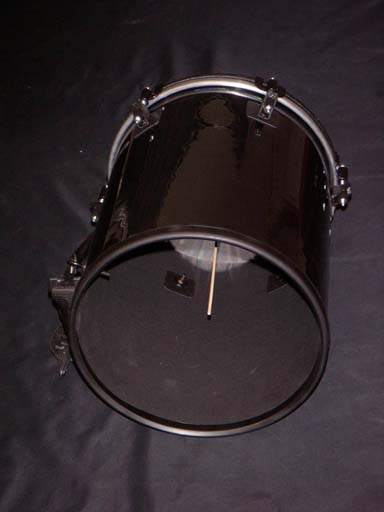
- Cuíca

Percussion instrument
- Other names: Puíta, Quíca
- Classification: Membranophone, single-head tubular drum, conical, ring-screw-mount hardware
- Developed: Brazil

The cuíca (Portuguese pronunciation: [kuˈikɐ]) is a Brazilian friction drum with a large pitch range, produced by changing tension on the head of the drum. Cuíca is Portuguese for the gray four-eyed opossum (Philander opossum) which is known for its high-pitched cry. The cuíca is frequently used in carnivals, as well as often in samba music. The tone it produces has a high-pitched squeaky timbre. It has been called a 'laughing gourd' due to this sound. The General MIDI drum kit provides cuíca sounds at the notes F♯_{5} and G_{5}.

Cuica sound

== History ==
There are a number of styles of cuíca found around the globe. Its origins are disputed, different sources trace it to enslaved Bantu people, while instruments like the pwita/kipuita are attributed to Angola, Spain, and to Muslim traders. Structurally it is identical, among other instruments in the same category, to the Portuguese sarronca, Spanish zambomba, Catalan simbomba and Balearic ximbomba.

== Characteristics ==
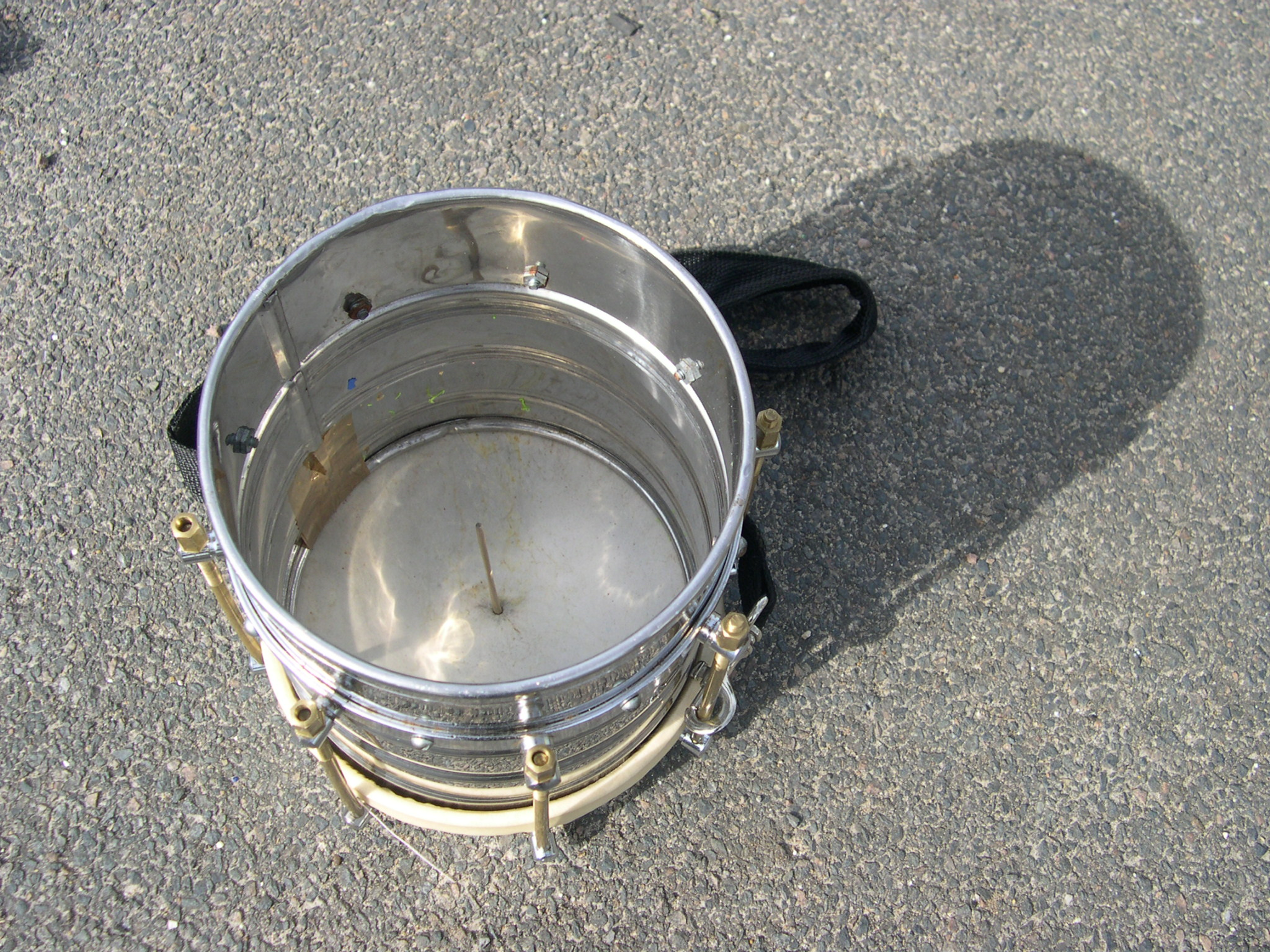
Bottom view and stick of a cuíca

The cuíca has a wooden or bamboo stick fastened at one end inside the drum in the center of, and perpendicular to, the drumhead. This stick is rosined and rubbed with a cloth. Changing the pressure on the head of the drum from the outside produces the different pitches and timbres. The body of the cuíca is normally made of metal, gourd or synthetic material. It has a single head, normally 6 to 10 inches (15 to 25 centimetres) in diameter, made of animal skin. The instrument is held under one arm at chest height with the help of a shoulder strap. To play the cuíca, the stick is rubbed up and down with a wet cloth held in one hand while using the fingers of the other hand to press down on the skin of the drum near the place where the stick is attached. The rubbing motion produces the sound and the pitch is increased or decreased by changing the pressure on the head.

== Usage ==
The cuíca is used to accompany a variety of different folk and urban popular dances. For example, it may be part of the instrumental ensemble for the Dança de Santa Cruz (Dance of the Holy Cross) celebrated every May in Santa Cruz, California or for the moçambique (Mozambique) dramatic dance, bailado, in Minas Gerais. It also is used in Feast of the Cross (Feast Of The Holy Cross) dances and processions and in samba music and dance performances in rural São Paulo.

The cuíca plays an important rhythmic role in samba music of all kinds. It is particularly notable as a fixture of Rio de Janeiro's Carnival groups, which feature entire sections of cuíca players. It is so commonly used in radio-oriented samba music that in the absence of a cuíca player, Brazilian singers or other musicians imitate the sound of the cuíca with their voices. An example of this imitation can be heard on the intro part of Dizzy Gillespie's version of "Chega de Saudade" (from the "Dizzy on the French Riviera" album, 1965) composed by Antônio Carlos Jobim. The cuíca can also be heard played by the Brazilian percussionist Airto Moreira on the 1999 reissue bonus track "Feio", on Miles Davis' album Bitches Brew. The instrument was also used in "Could You Be Loved" by Bob Marley and The Wailers, "Soul Bossa Nova" by Quincy Jones, "Bird of Beauty" by Stevie Wonder, and "Me and Julio Down by the Schoolyard" by Paul Simon. Along with samba, the cuíca is one of the mainly used Brazilian instruments in jazz-rock, free jazz, and Latin jazz.

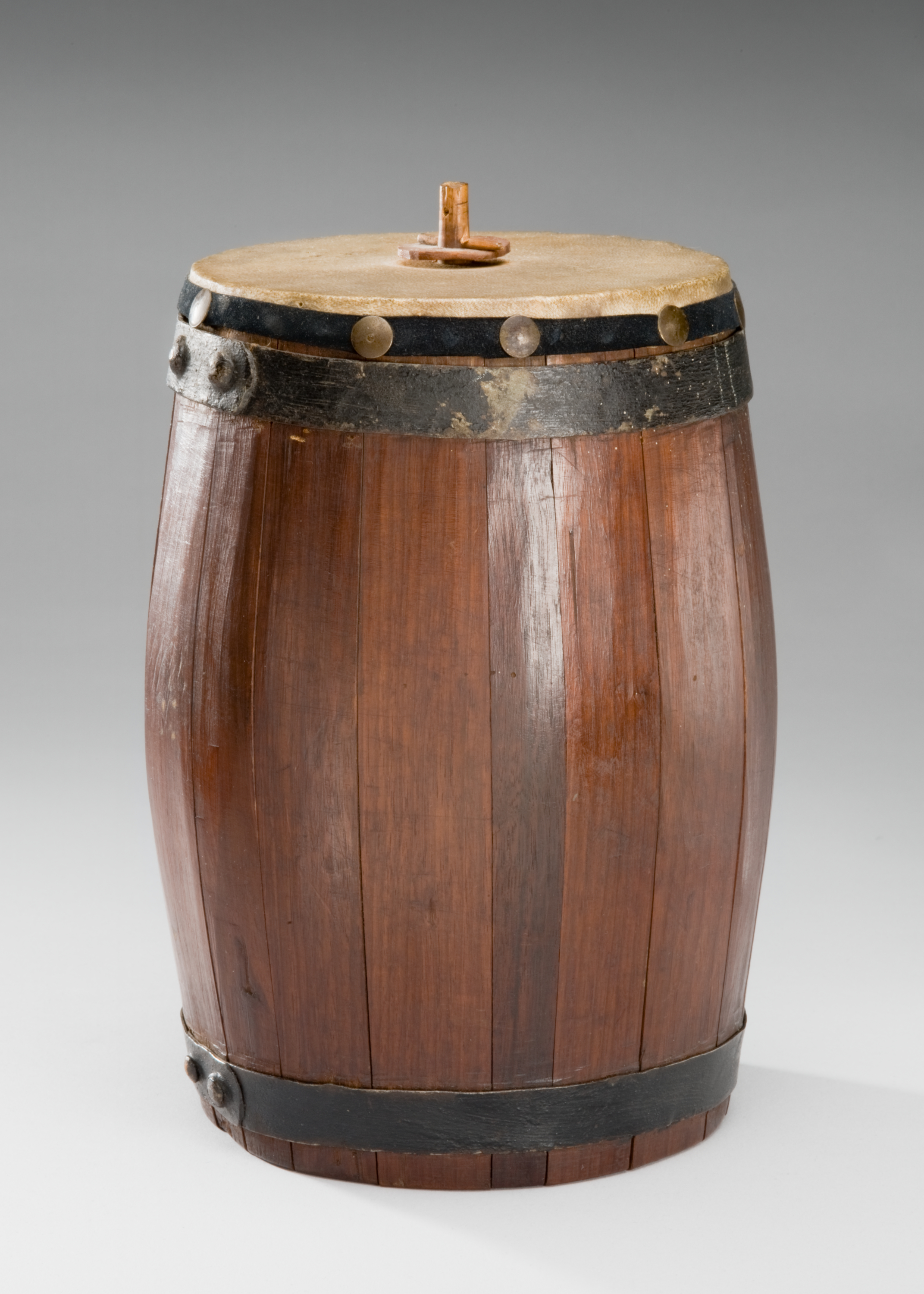
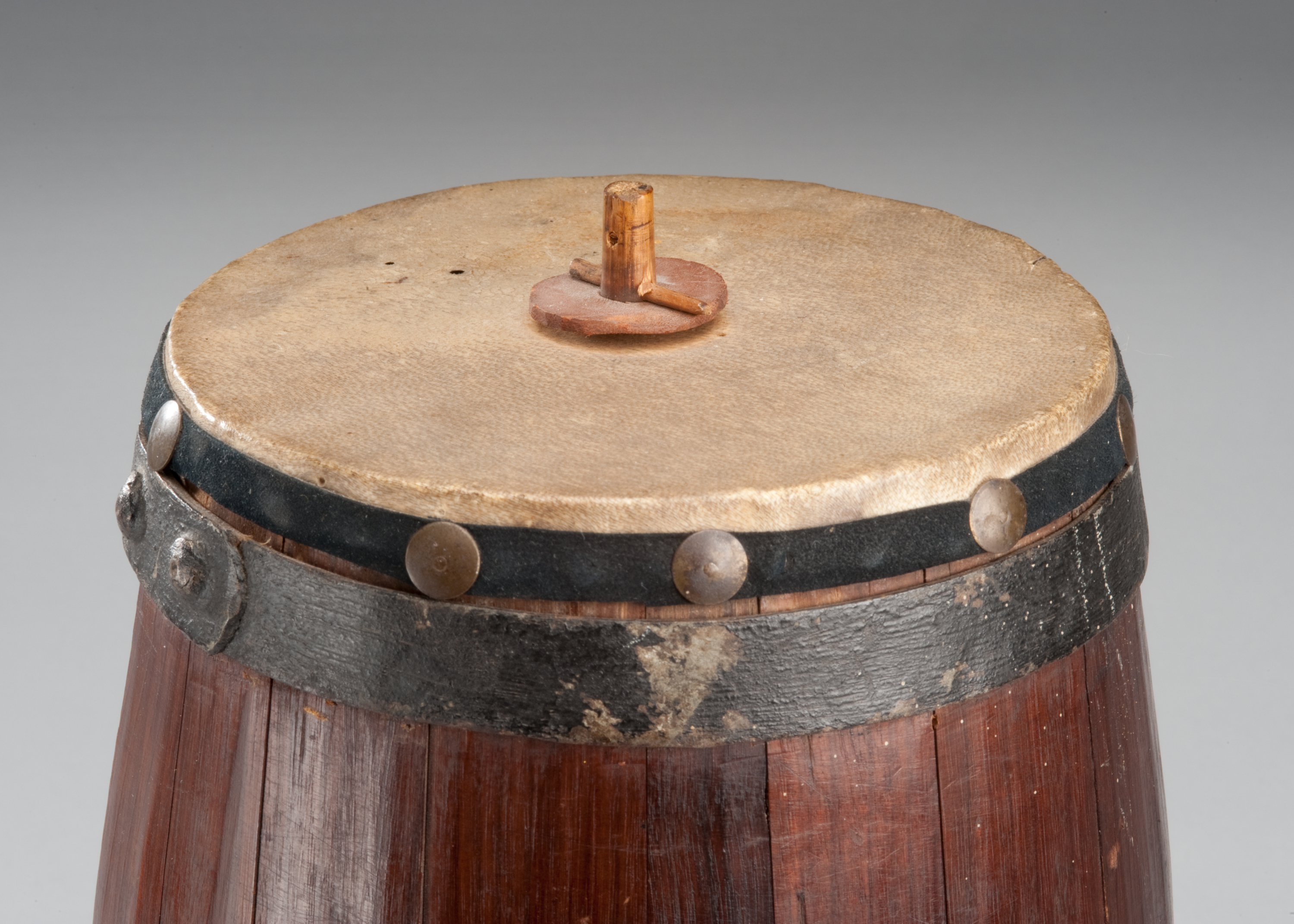
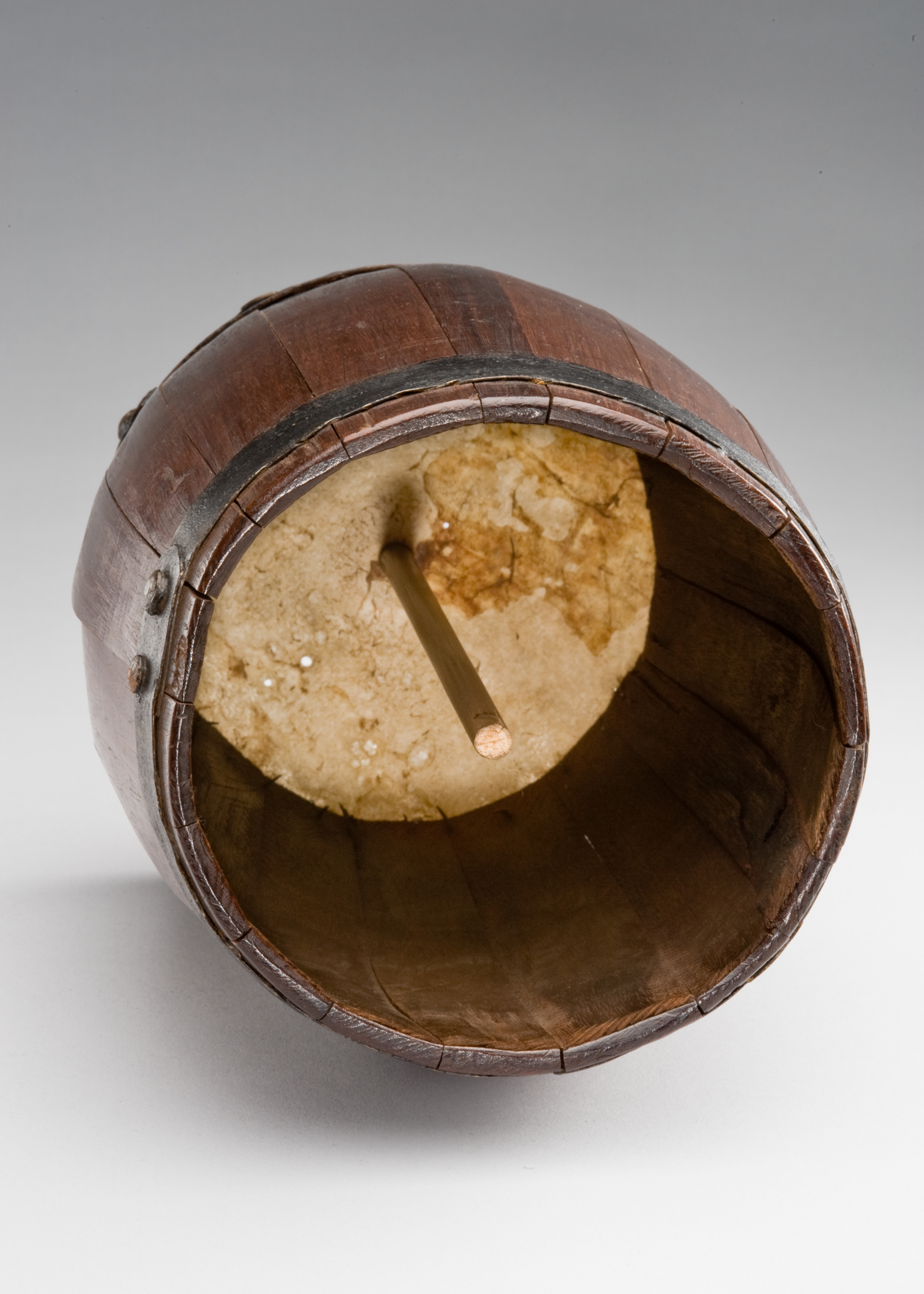
Cuíca friction drum at the Smithsonian.

== See also ==
- Buhay
- Friction drum
- Lion's roar (instrument)
