= The Rommelpot Player =

Painting by Frans Hals

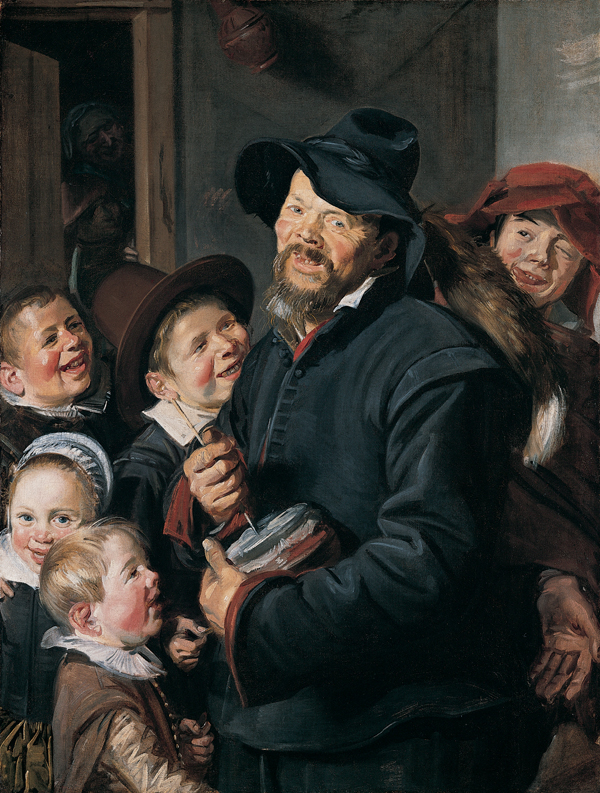
- The Rommelpot Player, circa 1618–1620, Oil on canvas, 106 cm × 80.3 cm (41.7 in × 31.6 in)
- Artist: Frans Hals
- Year: 1618
- Catalogue: W.R. Valentiner, Catalog 1923: #24
- Medium: Oil on canvas
- Dimensions: 106 cm × 80.3 cm (42 in × 31.6 in)
- Location: Kimbell Art Museum, Fort Worth
- Accession: ACF 1951.01
- Website: Rommelpot Player

The Rommelpot Player is a painting by the Dutch Golden Age painter Frans Hals, painted in 1618–1620 and now in the Kimbell Art Museum. It is considered the best of several versions of a rommelpot player by Frans Hals.

== Painting ==
Fifteen versions of this painting were documented by Hofstede de Groot in 1910, who wrote:

The Rommelpot- Player. In the centre is a man turned three-quarters left. He faces the spectator and laughs heartily. He is in dark clothes with a broad brimmed felt hat. His left forearm encircles the rommelpot (a type of drum traditionally consisting of an earthenware pot covered at the top by a bladder pierced by a stick that is pushed up and down or rotated); in his right hand is a stick with which he plays it. Six laughing children surround him. The biggest boy, behind him to the right, claps his hands with delight. The other five children are to the left. Four of them are placed so that their heads make a diagonal line down to the left. The second boy from the top has a slouch hat. The fifth child, a girl, stands to the left behind this boy. In the background peasants look in at a door.

Variants of this composition exist. Thus, the girl on the extreme left looks at the spectator and not up at the player in the picture of the Paul Giersberg sale. Another time, the girl is replaced by a boy who looks up at the player in the picture of the Paul Mersch sale while the second child from the bottom, a little girl, who usually looks up at the player, is facing the spectator.

A recognised original of this composition cannot now be traced. There are a number of replicas which at best date from the time of Frans Hals, while some perhaps come from his studio. As the figures are of life size in several replicas, it is to be inferred that the original was also of life size.

The rommelpot-player alone as a half-length figures in a picture in the Hamburg Kunsthalle; signed in Gothic letters, "Fhals"; panel, 10 inches by 9 inches; acquired with the Hudtwalker-Wesselhoeft collection, 1888; reproduced in Bode's work on the Wesselhoeft collection.

The chief replicas of the whole composition are :

1. In the collection of Carl von Hollitscher, Berlin; panel, 19 1/2 inches by 15 inches; exhibited at Berlin, 1890, No. 82; here the girl looks at the spectator.
2. In the Holscher-Stumpf collection, Berlin; canvas, 26 1/2 inches by 19 1/2 inches; here the second child from the bottom looks at the spectator.
3. In the Amalienstift, Dessau, 1877 catalogue, No. 109; panel.
4. (B. 96). In the collection of Herr Goldschmidt, junior, Frankfort-on-Main; panel, 15 1/2 inches by 12 1/2 inches; in the sales : Gsell, Vienna, March 14, 1872, No. 38; and Schorer, Groot Bentveld, April 26, 1892, No. 32 (6000 florins, Goedhart).
5. In the collection of Sir F. Cook, Bart., Richmond; canvas, 47 inches by 32 1/2 inches; exhibited at the Guildhall, London, 1903, No. 173; here the girl looks at the spectator.
6. (B. 154). In the collection of the Earl of Pembroke, Wilton House, No. 29; here the girl looks at the spectator.
7. Mentioned in the inventory of the goods of J. van de Cappelle, dated January 4, 1680; see Oud Holland, x. 34, No. 99.
8. In the sale : H. van der Vugt, Amsterdam, April 27, 1745 (Hoet, n. 164), No. 103 or No. 104 in the original catalogue (55 florins, Pieter Yver), measuring 43 inches by 30 inches.
9. In the sales : Madame Lenglier, Paris, March 10, 1788 (370 francs); Destouches, Paris, March 21, 1794; panel, 21 1/2 inches by 17 inches. Engraved by Hubert in the Galerie Lebrun. The engraver has erred with the hands of the figure on the right behind the player. In the picture the boy strikes his right fist into his open left hand. In the print the hands become a confused knot of folds. Here the girl looks at the player.
10. "A Merry Rommelpot-Player and two Laughing Children." This was in the sales : P. M. Kesler, C. Apostool, and others, Amsterdam, May 13, 1844, No. 37 (50 florins, Roos); and J. A. A. de Lelie and others, Amsterdam, July 29, 1845, No. 78.
11. In the sale : J. van der Veen, Amsterdam, April 14, 1851, No. 112.
12. (B. 27). In the sale : Neville D. Goldsmid of The Hague, Paris, May 4, 1876, No. 43 measuring 40 inches by 32 inches. It came from the Tholen collection, Emden.
13. (B. 61; M. 223). In the sales: Count Mniszech, Paris, April 9, 1902, No. 126 (35,000 francs); and H. J. A. Eyre and others, London, December 9, 1905, No. 59 measuring 40 inches by 33 inches. Here the girl looks at the player.
14. In the sale : Paul Giersberg of Wesel, Cologne, April 16, 1907 No. 33. Here the girl looks at the spectator.
15. In the sale : Paul Mersch, Paris, May 8, 1908, No. 39. Here there are only five children; the second from the bottom, a girl, looks at the spectator.

== Other versions ==
Besides this one, the other known versions of this painting are

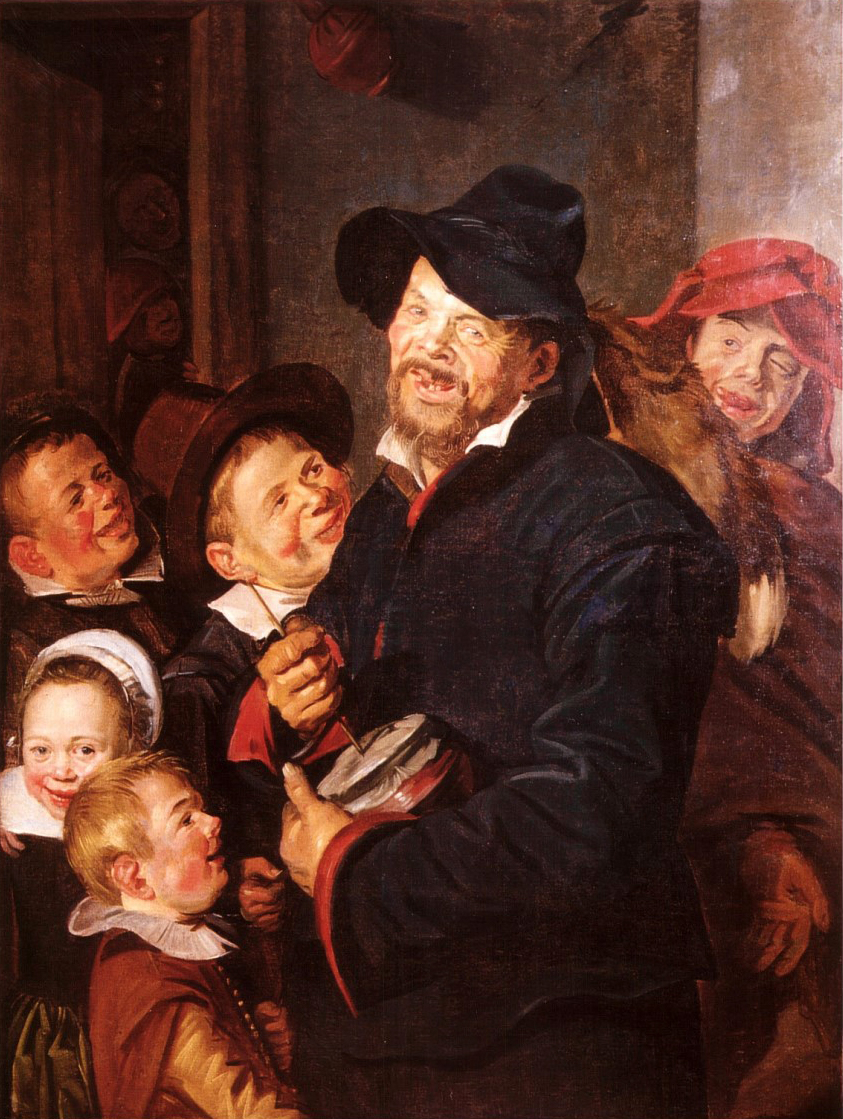
First Munich version

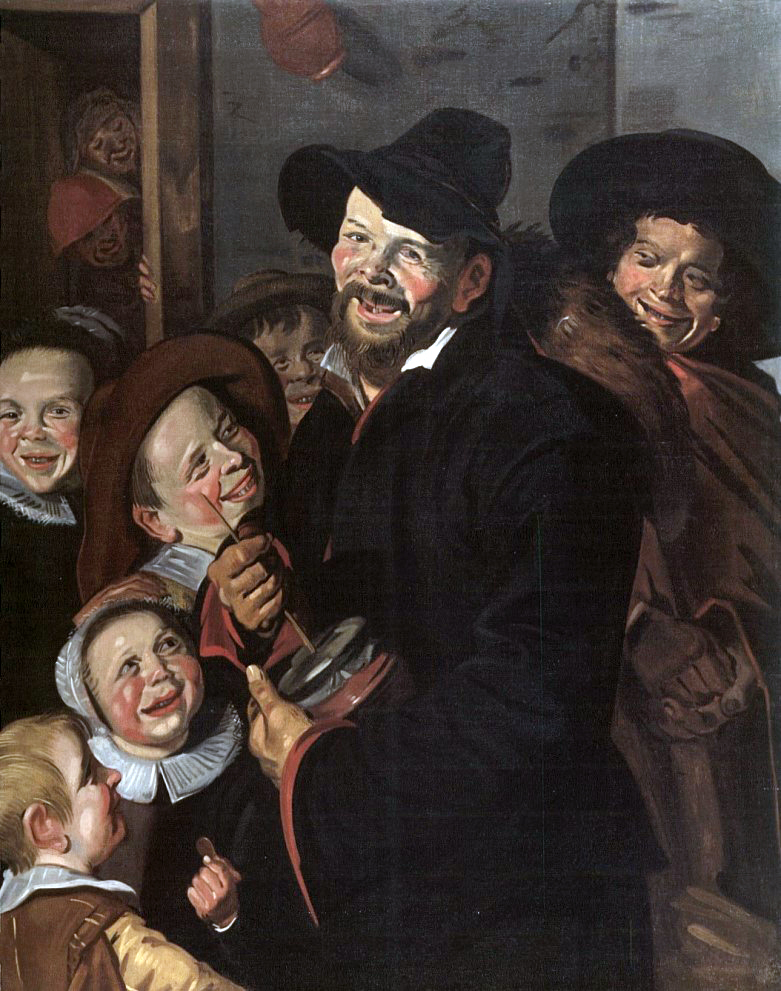
Second Munich version with "confused hands"

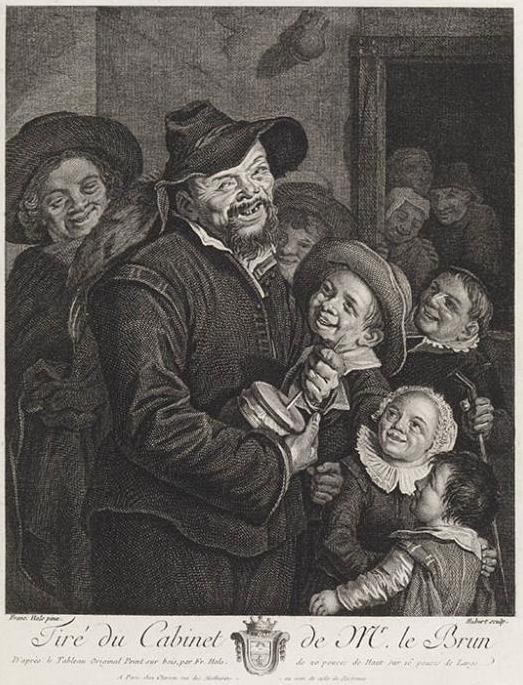
Engraving by François Hubert with "confused hands"

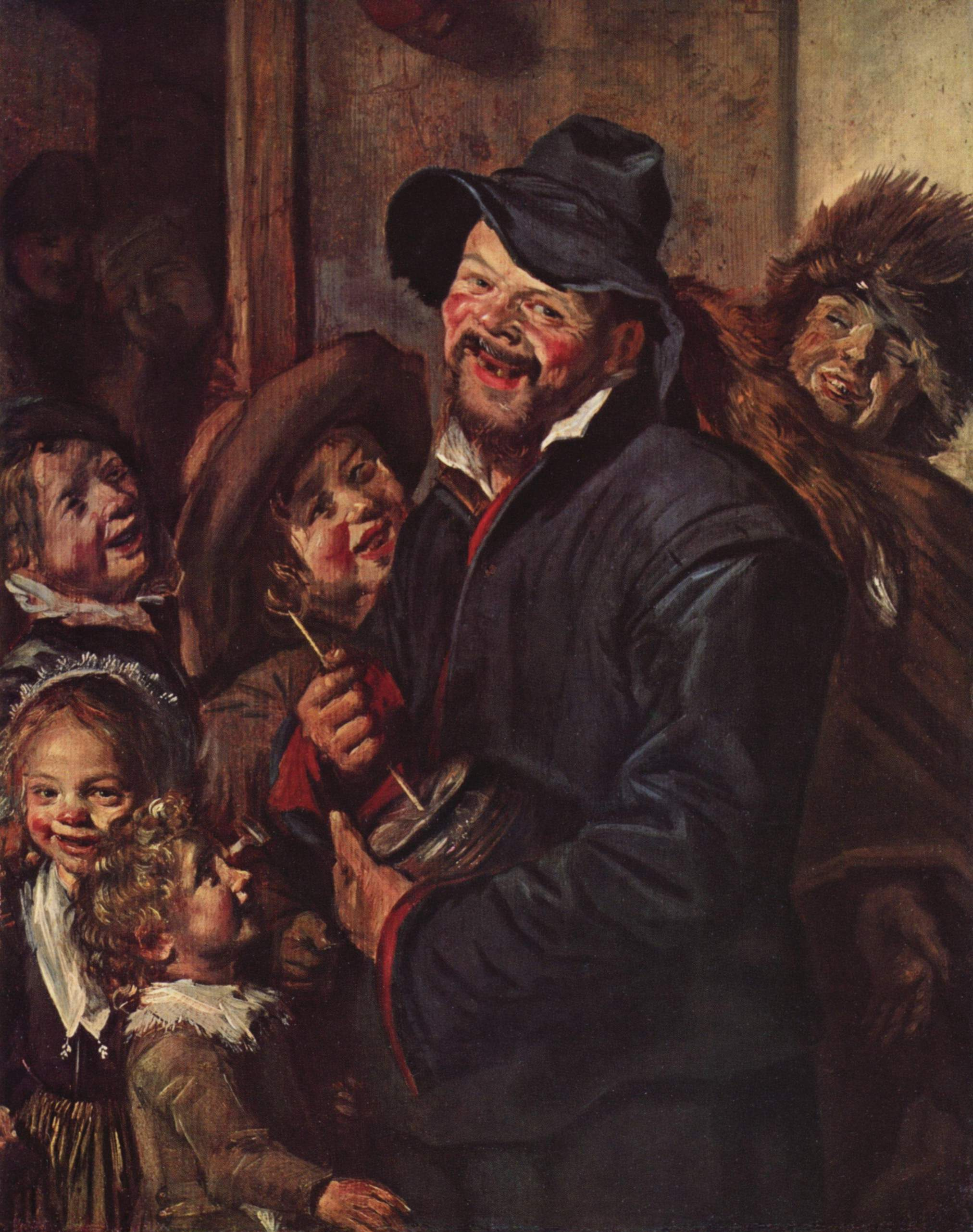
Version at the Art Institute of Chicago

== See also ==
- List of paintings by Frans Hals
