= Buhay =

Ukrainian drum

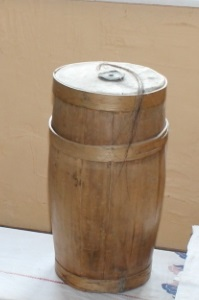
- Other names: HS#:232.11-92
- Classification: Membranophone

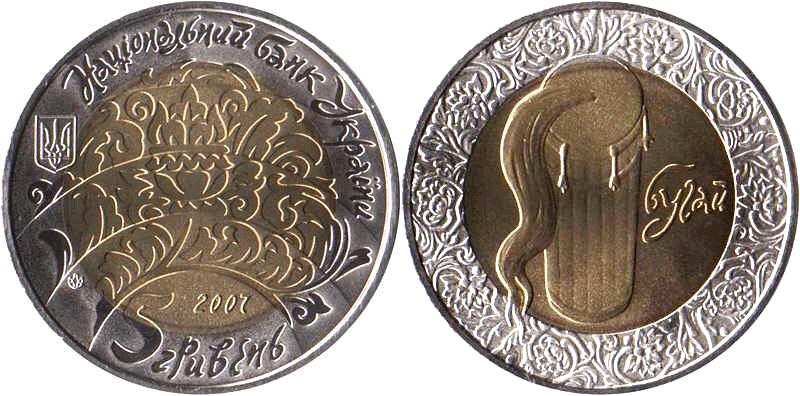
Commemorative Coin "Buhay"

The buhay (Ukrainian: бугай) (also known as a bugai, buhai, berebenytsia, bika, buga, bochka) is a musical instrument that is used in Ukraine and is classified as a friction drum. Buhay is the Ukrainian word for great bittern (Botaurus stellaris), and its use as name of the instrument refers to the sound produced. The mating call or contact call of the male buhay (Botaurus stellaris) is a deep, sighing fog-horn or bull-like boom with a quick rise and an only slightly longer fall, easily audible from a distance of 3 mi (4.8 km) on a calm night.

Hornbostel-Sachs classification number 232.11-92

The buhay consists of a conical barrel (sometimes a wooden bucket). At one end a sheep membrane is stretched with a hole in this skin's center. Through this hole a tuft of horse hair with a knot at one end is passed. Usually two performers are needed to operate the instrument, one to hold the instrument, the other to pull the horsehair with moistened fingers. In recent times versions of the buhay have been made which are held in position by the players feet allowing one player to play the instrument. Five to six different sounds can be obtained from the instrument, depending on the skill of the player.

The buhay and local variants is common to Ukraine, Romania (called buhai), Moldova, Hungary, Lithuania, and Poland (with various regional names: burczybas, "grumbling bass", brzãczadło, brzãczëdło, brzãczk, mrëczk, bąk, bùk, brantop, brumtop, brumbas).

== See also ==
- Cuíca
- Ukrainian folk music
- Lion's roar
