= Friction drum =

Class of musical instruments

- Other names: zambomba
- Classification: Membranophone

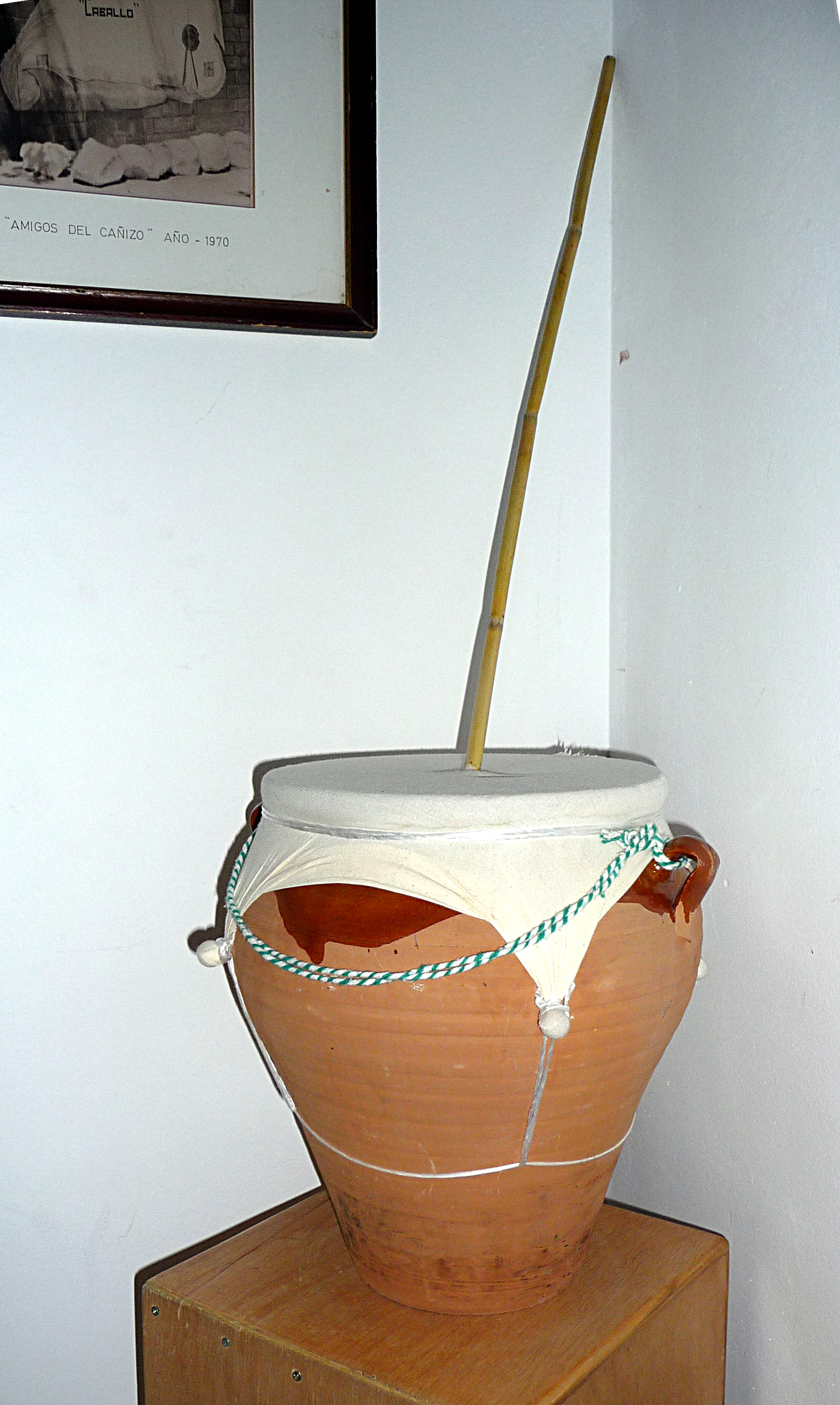
Spanish friction drum

A friction drum is a musical instrument found in various forms in Africa, Asia, Europe and South America. In Europe it emerged in the 16th century and was associated with specific religious and ceremonial occasions.

Friction Drum
A friction drum being played.

== Construction ==
A friction drum is a percussion instrument consisting of a single membrane stretched over a sound box, whose sound is produced by the player causing the membrane to vibrate by friction. The sound box may be a pot or jug or some open-ended hollow object. To produce the friction, the membrane may be directly rubbed with the fingers or through the use of a cloth, or a stick or cord which is attached to the centre of the membrane and then rubbed or moved with a hand, sponge or cloth, generally wet. The membrane may be depressed with the thumb while playing to vary the pitch. When a cord is used the instrument may be referred to as a "string drum" or "lion's roar."

In some friction drums, the friction is obtained by spinning the drum around a pivot.

== Use in Western European classical music ==
The composer Orlando Gibbons (1583–1625) wrote a keyboard fantasia in which he quotes the Dutch melody De Rommelpot. In modern times the friction drum has been used by several Western composers. Edgard Varèse used it in Hyperprism (1924) and Ionisation (1933). Alexander Goehr specifies a "lion's roar" in his Romanza for cello and orchestra (1968). Carl Orff used a whirled friction drum in A Midsummer Night's Dream (1934–52) and Benjamin Britten, in his Children's Crusade, (1969) calls for a string drum to be struck with drumsticks and bowed by means of the stretched string. Jerry Goldsmith used one in his 1968 score for "Planet of the Apes"

== Depictions in Western European paintings ==
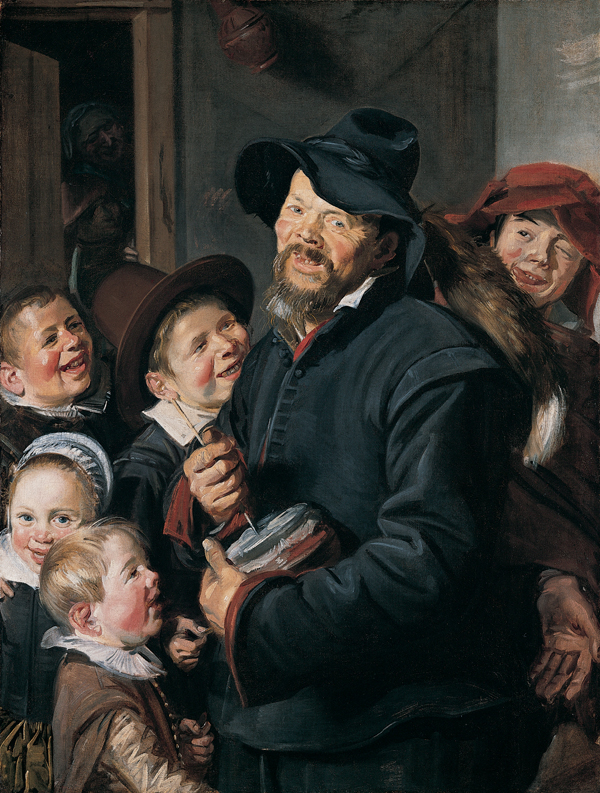
Rommelpot Player. Frans Hals, about 1618–1620, Kimbell, Fort Worth

The rommelpot features in several paintings by Dutch painters, including Two Boys and a Girl Making Music by Jan Miense Molenaer (1629, National Gallery, London) and The Fight Between Carnival and Lent by Pieter Brueghel (1559, Kunsthistorisches Museum, Vienna).

== Regional use in folk music ==
- Belgium: rommelpot, played by folk singers, often as the sole accompaniment to their singing.
- Brazil: cuíca, primarily used in Rio de Janeiro-style Carnival samba. A stick is attached to the centre of the membrane and protrudes into the inside of the sound box, which is an open-ended cylinder. The player reaches inside the sound box from the other end to rub the stick.
- Denmark: rummelpot or rumlepot. In some parts of Denmark, e.g. Southern Jutland, traditionally groups of masked children go from house to house on New Year's Eve singing songs to the rhythmic accompaniment of the rummelpot and receiving æbleskiver, sweets or fruits in return.
- France: tambour à friction, and local names (brau, bramadèra, brama-topin, petador, pinhaton in the South). Tambour à cordes is used for a string drum, not be confused with the tambourin à cordes, a stringed instrument.
- Germany: Brummtopf or Rummelpott, in Berlin and old Prussia Waldteufel. On New Year's Eve there is a tradition in North Germany in which groups of masked children with homemade instruments, including the Rummelpott, go from house to house singing special Rummelpott songs in Low German, receiving sweets or fruits in return. Adults go out later that evening and typically receive shots of schnapps.
- Hungary: köcsögduda (jughorn or jugpipe), especially used in zither orchestras. Leather or parchment is tightened over the top of a large terracotta or wooden jug. A reed or length of horsehair is fastened to the cover and rubbed with a wet hand.
- Italy: caccavella or putipù; also known by many other names. The body may be an earthenware pot, a wooden tub or a tin can, with a length of bamboo pierced through an animal skin membrane and rubbed.
- Malta: ir-rabbaba or iz-zafzafa. The instrument consists of a tin, wood or clay body with a stretched membrane of cat, goat or rabbit skin which has a stick tied in the centre. The stick is rubbed with a wet sponge.
- Netherlands: foekepot or rommelpot. The syllable “foek” is probably meant to be onomatopoeic. It is rubbed with a rosined stick. In some parts of the Netherlands, e.g. on the island of IJsselmonde, it was tradition, until the 1950s, to go from house to house on New Year's Eve singing songs to the rhythmic accompaniment of the rommelpot. This tradition is still maintained in North Holland on the feast of St. Martin. In Brabant rommelpot can also refer to the dance which is accompanied by the instrument.
- Poland: burczybas.
- Portugal: sarronca.
- Romania: buhai (similar to the Ukrainian buhay), made of a wooden tub or bucket open at both ends with an animal skin tightened over the top and pierced in the middle for a horsehair "ox tail". This is rubbed with a wet hand. It is traditionally used in the New Year's ritual plugușorul ("the little plough"), where it reproduces the sound of oxen mooing when pulling the plough.
- Russia: gusachyok or gusyok (Russian: Гусачок or гусёк). The top of a clay pot is covered with skin of bull. It is rubbed with a rosined stick.
- Slovenia: lončeni bas (pottery bass), also called gudalo or vugaš. The instrument is a clay pot, generally between 20 and 40 cm tall, covered with skin or parchment and with a resin-coated hardwood stick of similar length tied in the center.
- Spain: zambomba. This friction drum can be made from a variety of materials and rubbed either with a rod or with rope. It is particularly associated with Christmas, when it used to accompany the singing of carols.
- Ukraine: buhay (Ukrainian: бугай) (also known as bugai, buhai, berebenytsia, bika, buga, bochka). This instrument was traditionally used as part of New Year's and Christmas rituals. It is included in Ukrainian folk orchestras.
- Venezuela: The furro is used in aguinaldos, parrandas and Zulian traditional music such as gaita, these can also be known as furruco, and mandullo.
- Colombia: zambumbia.
- Mexico: arcusa, bote del diablo or tigrera.
- Cuba: ékue.

== See also ==
- Cuica

=== References ===
- The New Grove Dictionary of Music & Musicians; edited by Stanley Sadie; 1980; ISBN 1-56159-174-2
- Music in the Renaissance; by Gustave Reese; London 1954
- Anna Borg-Cardona, 'The Maltese Friction Drum' Journal of the American Musical Instrument Society, vol. XXVII, (2002), pp. 174–210.
