= Lion's roar (instrument) =

Membranophone instrument

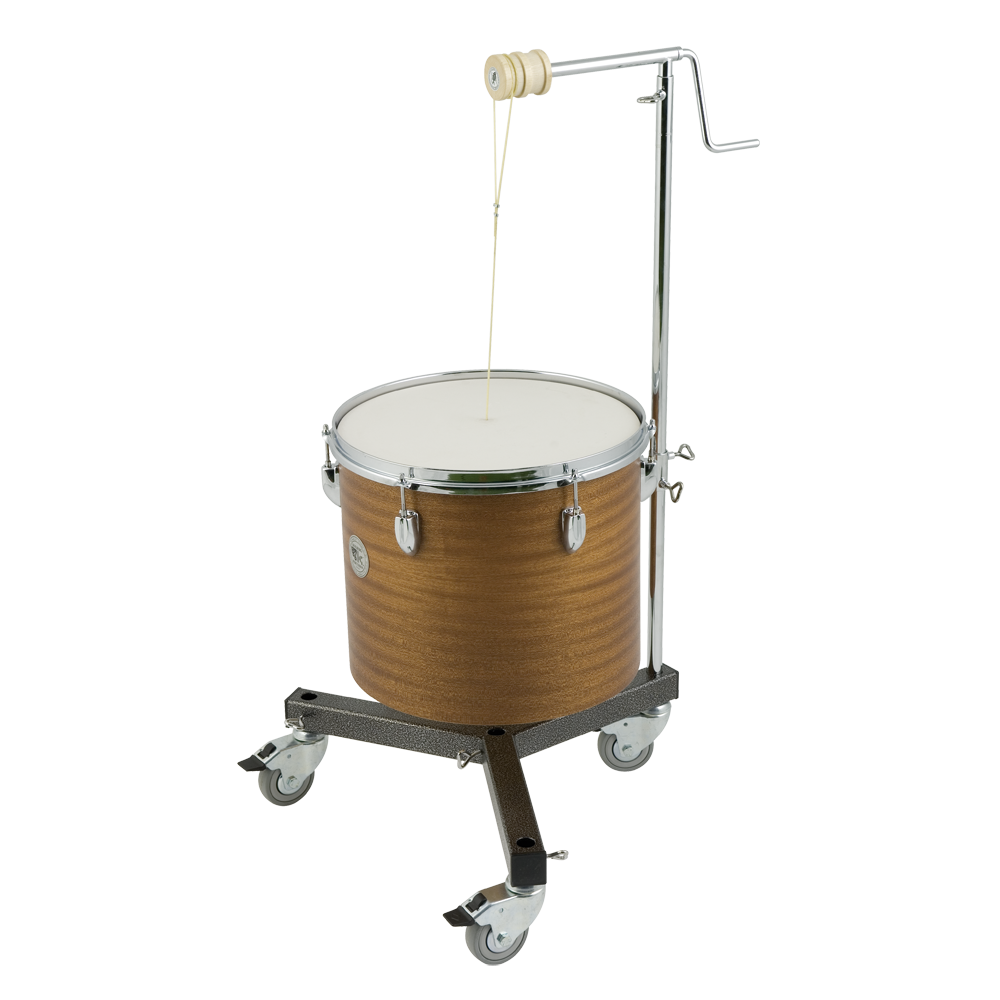
- Other names: String drum; Löwengebrull (de); Cuíca (fr); rugghio di leone (it)
- Classification: Chordophone or friction drum

The lion's roar is a membranophone instrument that has a drum head and a cord or horsehair passing through it. It gets its name from the sound it produces, which closely resembles a lion's roar. The home-made lion's roar is a drum that sits on the floor. The cord then makes friction with the drum head as it is moved back and forth.

== Classification ==
According to the Gary D. Cook classification system of musical instruments, it is a chordophone because it produces sound through the vibration of strings. It can also be classified as a friction drum.

== Form ==
The lion's roar consists of a cylindrical or bucket-shaped vessel with one end open and the other closed with a membrane. A length of cord or gut is fastened through a hole in the centre of the membrane; the cord is resined and rubbed with coarse fabric or a glove, producing an imitation of a lion's roar.

In the past this was always a two-handed operation – one hand held the cord taut, the other gripped and slid up the cord, but in the late 20th century Kolberg produced a mounted model, with the cord held taut, requiring only one hand. In another version of the instrument, the end of the string is loosely secured to a wooden handle to form a whirled friction drum.

== See also ==
- Buhay
