= Sarronca =

Portuguese musical instrument

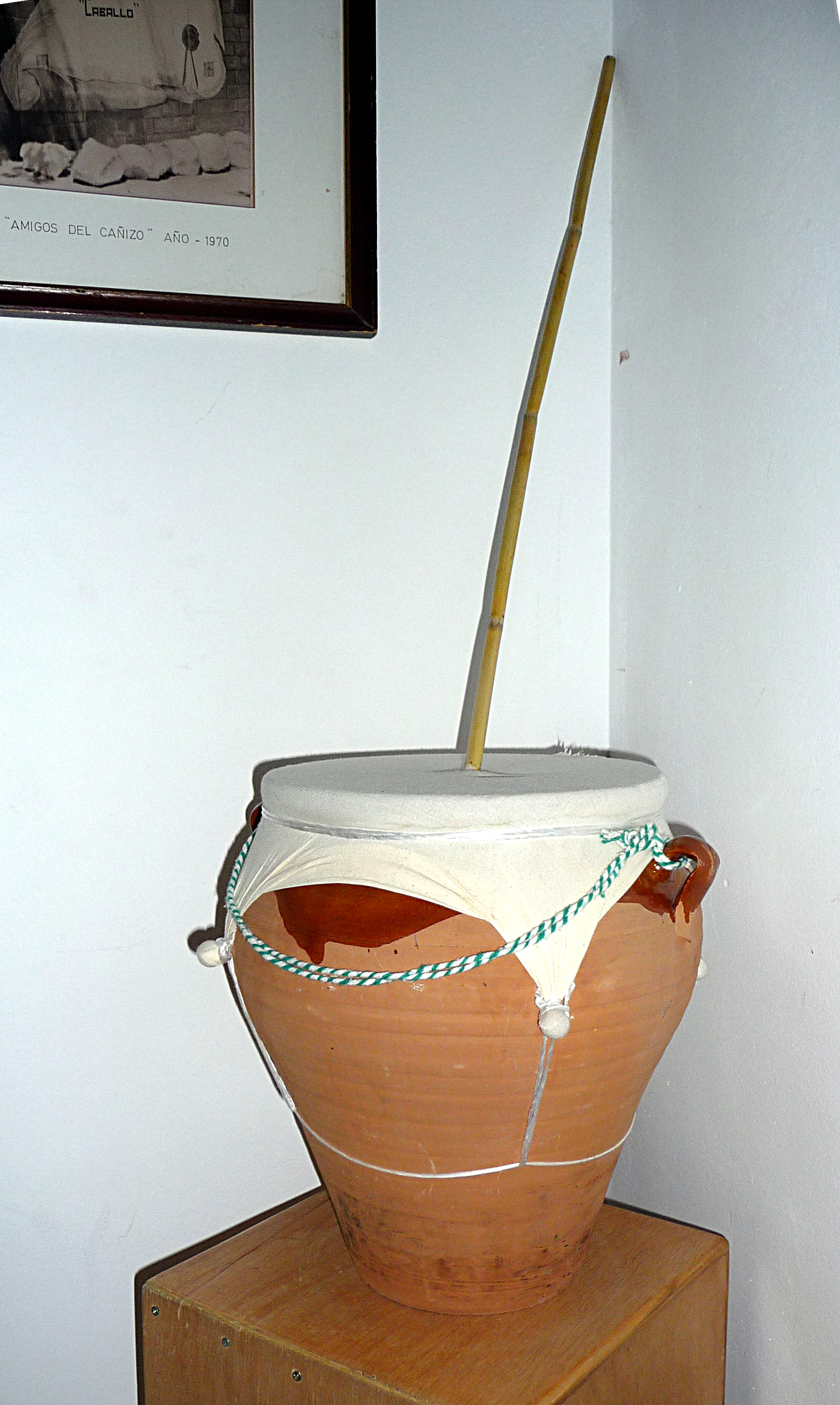
A sarronca.

The sarronca, zambomba, runcho or furruco is a traditional percussion musical instrument, more precisely a rubbed membranophone. It is typical of Portugal, Spain, where it usually accompanies villancicos, aguinaldos, and other popular songs. It is also used in traditional music in latin american countries such as Colombia or Venezuela.

== Form and use ==
It is composed of a stretched skin over a hollow container that serves as a resonance box (which may be a can, a jug, a wooden cylinder or similar). The center of the skin is pierced by a wood stick or a reed, and the sound is obtained by moving the rod downward and upward, so that the rod rubs the stretched skin. This rod may sometimes be replaced with a rope. When the rod is rubbed with both hands, the vibration produced by the rod is transmitted to the skin, creating a deep and peculiar sound.

== Other meanings of the term ==
- In some zones in Spain, zambomba refers to the typical Christmas celebrations in which people sing villancicos while playing this instrument.
- In the autonomous community of Andalusia, mainly in the province of Málaga, zambomba is a term used to describe techno electronic music, in its faster and more obscure branches, generally, acid techno and schranz. This connotation has its origins in a collective called AstralTech, that promotes these musical standards considered obsolete by current tendencies in electronic music. This term is used due to the similarities of the sounds.
