= Naqus =

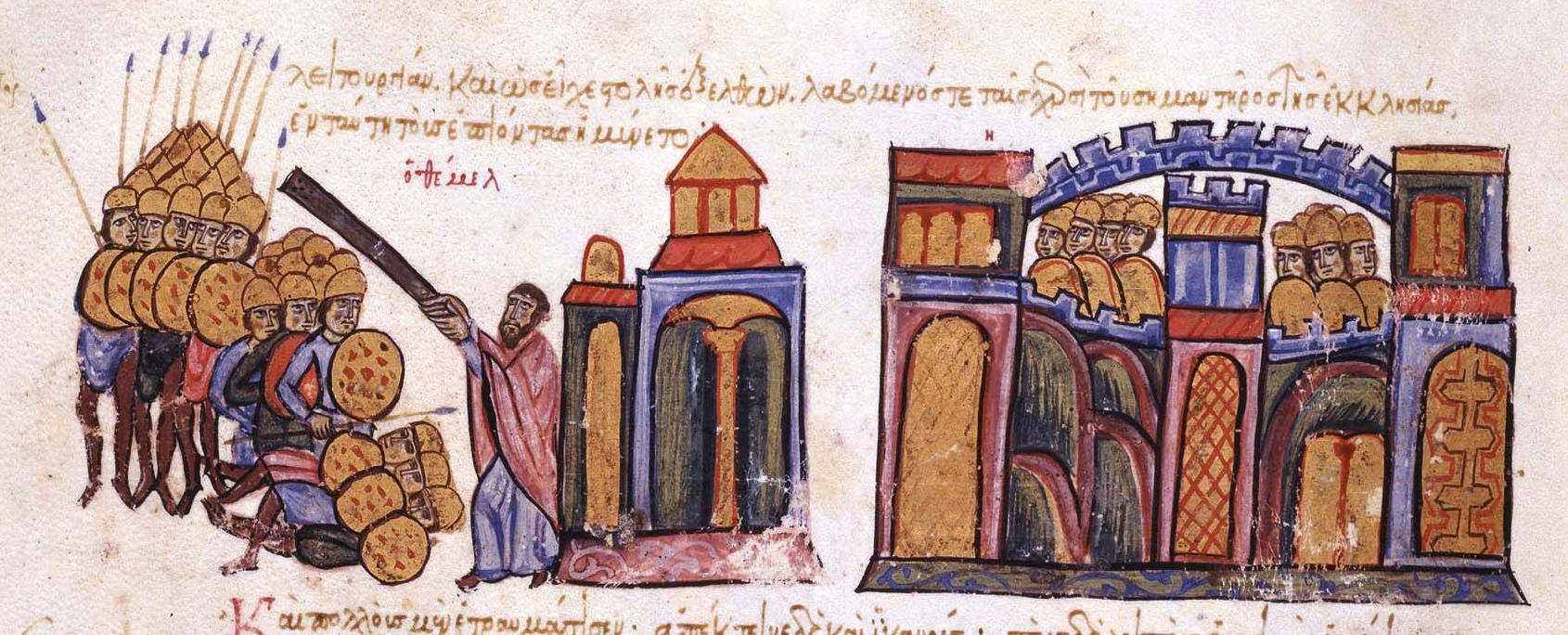
The priest Themel drives off the Arabs of Tarsus with his semantron. Miniature in the Greek Chronicle Madrid Illuminated Manuscript des Skylitzes, second half of the 12th century. Chapter XI, fol. 132r

The naqus (Arabic: ناقوس, romanized: nāqūs; Syriac: ܢܩܘܫܐ) is a percussion musical instrument, and under that name there are a set of traditions associated with Islamic-Christian relations. It can either be a bell or a wooden plank; in the latter form, it is similar to the semantron.

The Arabic word nāqūs goes back to the Syriac naqosha (from naqash, "to strike") and reached the Aethiosemitic languages with the meaning "gong", "handbell". The show the two meanings of nagus...a billet of wood struck, and a bell or hand-bell.

The instrument called a naqus is also referred to in the Bahá'í document Lawh-i-Naqus, "Tablet of the Bell". This "indicates a pierced wooden clapper-board which had a gong or bell-like function in making a noise when hit with a stick."

== Tonewood ==
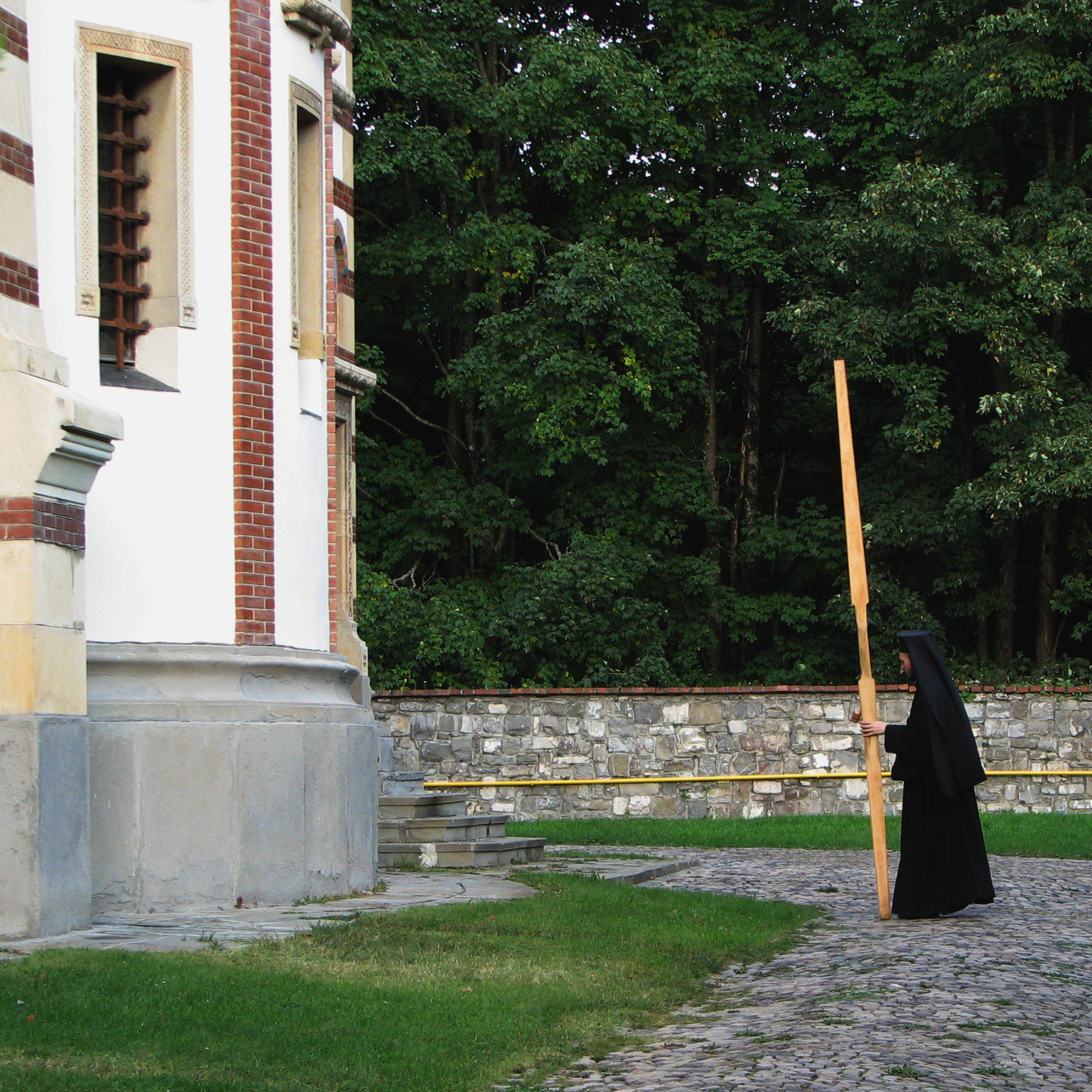
Portable tonewood in the form of a double paddle, sporadically used to this day in Romanian monasteries: Toacă in Sinaia Monastery .

According to Islamic tradition, the companions of Muhammad were unsure of what the sign for the daily prayers (salāt) should be. Mohammad therefore decided between a fire, a bell, a Jewish horn (shofar) and the nāqūs for the muezzin's call to prayer (adhān). Apparently, in the early days of Fustat, the Muslims struck the nāqūs as an early-morning call to prayer. The sound of the nāqūs as a call to prayer was heard along with the crowing of the cocks.

The name naqus was used among Christians too, who used the nāqūs since pre-Islamic times. Clattering wood (nāqūs) was mentioned by the poet Labīd (around 560 —661), who saw them in villages on the coast southwest of Qatar on the Arabian Peninsula. Archaeological excavations at a pre-Islamic Nestorian monastery on an island west of Abu Dhabi suggest that the church had an upper floor with a steeple, which probably contained a wooden nāqūs instead of a bell.

In general, the nāqūs has often been at the center of cultural tensions between Christians in Arab areas. After Caliph Al-Walid I had the Byzantine cathedral of Damascus converted into the Umayyad Mosque around 705, al-Masʿūdī reported an incident that caused irritation. At the moment when the caliph mounted the minbar in the mosque to address the believers, a nāqus was heard. The proximity between the church and the mosque often seems to have caused noise pollution.

The Islamic scholar Abu Yusuf (729/731-798) mentioned in his Kitāb al-Ḫarāğ (“Book on Property Tax”) the obligations that Christians had to observe under Islamic rule. This included not striking the nāqūs before or during Islamic prayer times. Elsewhere it is stated that the nāqūs should only be played softly or only within the church. These restrictions are also confirmed by the orthodox side, such as the patriarch Michael the Syrian (1126-1199) and the scholar Gregorius Bar-Hebraeus (c. 1225-1286). The naqus hitting loudly in public was considered a violation of the law. In return, Christian dignitaries were sometimes given permission to beat drums and play trumpets or other musical instruments at special religious ceremonies. The cauldron drum naqqara and long trumpets (buk) have been used to honor rulers since ancient times.

The Jewish scholar Daniel al-Kumisi († 946) wrote that the use of the nāqūs was characteristic of the Christians of Jerusalem around 900. A mid-11th-century account of a town believed to be in Palestine mentions that the Christians ignored the existing laws and built a church higher than the local mosque. The church was then demolished, and the loud beating of the nāqūs also disturbed the Muslims.

== Handbell ==
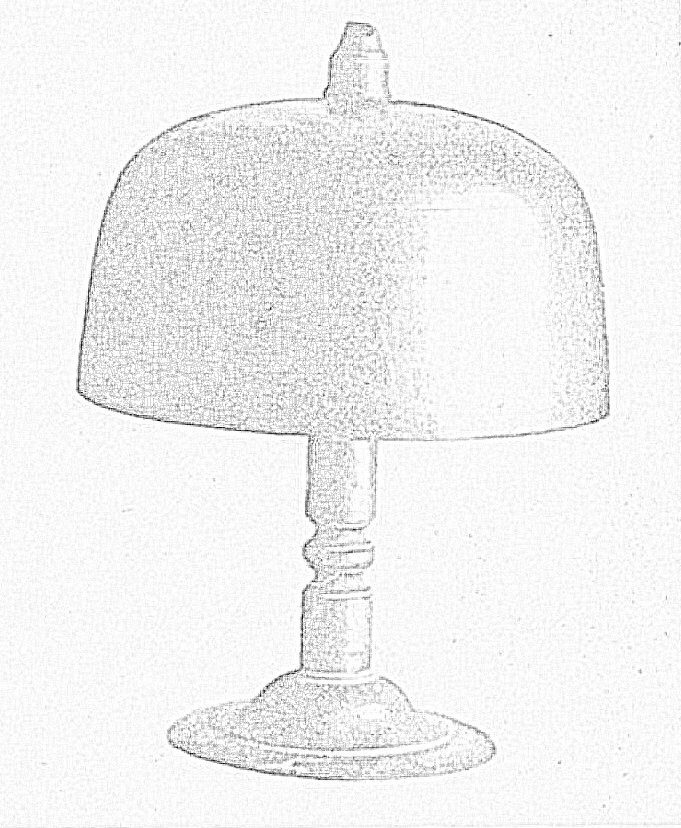
Egyptian naqus. Not the handbell type, this bowl-shaped bell sits on a vertical support, like a lampshade.

In addition to the tonewoods, the small bells that have come down to us from ancient Egyptian times and that Copts used in worship in Egypt are also called nāqūs. The oldest bells are known from the New Kingdom. The Christian Copts took up their forms again between the 3rd and 6th centuries. According to Hans Hickmann, the later use of bells in the Roman Catholic liturgy in Rome could have originated from this period.

There are handle bells as half-shell handle bells without a clapper. Another type of nāqūs is shaped like a bedside lamp. The mushroom-shaped bell with a round base and a total height of 29 centimeters and a bell diameter of 22 centimeters is too heavy to hold in your hand. This nāqūs was used in the Catholic Church in Egypt in the mid-20th century, but not in the Greek Orthodox Church.

Exclusively metal idiophones traditionally accompany liturgical chants in the Maronite Church in Lebanon. These include nāqūs made of two metal half-shells on a handle, which are struck with a metal stick and sound like triangles, as well as larger cymbals, paired cymbals and marawe (marawih, Sg. marwahah). The latter consist of a metal disc on a wooden handle about one meter long with small metal parts attached to the edge of the disc and are typologically related to rattle drums and sisters. The congregation receives the holy sacraments at the sound of nāqūs and marawe.

The nāqūs, used by Christians, which was a wooden or metal striking plate, is mentioned in two tales in the Arabian Nights, in which it calls the faithful to prayer from the roof of the Chapel of Mary.

A diminutive of nāqūs is nuqaisāt, by which the Berbers of the Maghreb mean finger cymbals.

== Gebel naqus ==
A geological feature was named for theme nagus based on a similarity of sound. The feature is a rocky mountain on the Red Sea coast in the south-west of the Sinai Peninsula (north-west of the coastal town of el-Tur and south-west of St Catherine's Monastery), called Gebel Naqus ('Bell Mountain').

The naming is based on the legend of a lost Christian monastery in the remote area near el-Tur. The legend says that the monastery disappeared without a trace so that nobody knows its location anymore, but from which the sound of prayer bells can be heard at certain hours.

Captain Palmer, leader of an English expedition as part of the Royal Geographical Society to the Sinai Peninsula in 1868, reported Arabs who stated that the sound from the mountain could only be heard on Fridays and Saturdays and that it came from the beaten wooden planks of the sunken monastery.

Ulrich Jasper Seetzen (1767–1811), who in the summer of 1810 (during the date harvest) stayed at el-Tur, discovered the mysterious ringing of bells on the slopes of Gebel Naqus and also found the physical explanation. Seetzen saw that from the hard-packed layer of sand covering the steep slopes of the hill, around midday, when the sun was particularly hot, loose sand began to slide down, making a sound that reminded him of the sound of Aeolian harps.

== Morocco ==
In Morocco, the Naqus is a bell or metal clapper played by Rwais (professional musicians of the High Atlas mountains of Morocco). It is described as "the nāqūus (a bell originally made of a copper tube, now usually made from a car's brake drum)".

== Literature ==
Nāḳūs.

In: The Encyclopedia of Islam, new edition, Volume 7, 1993, p. 943,

Naqus.

In: Sibyl Marcuse: Musical Instruments: A Comprehensive Dictionary. Doubleday, New York 1964, p. 360
