= Kirikoketa =

The kirikoketa (Basque pronunciation: [kiˈɾikoketa] or [kiɾikoˈketa]) is a specialized Basque music wooden device akin to the txalaparta and closely related to working activities. It is classified as an idiophone (a percussion instrument). It has lately caught on with cultural circles from the Basque Country at a local level.

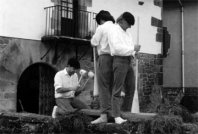
Kirikoketa performance in the street

== Instrument ==
The kirikoketa, named after the sound it emits, consists of a single board some 1.5m long and two or three strikers the height of a person, one per person, with a cone shaped wide base. Hammers may be used too by hitting them against the board. But for a small elevation, the board stands almost at the ground level sustained on two low and soft mounds at both ends.

== Origin and development ==
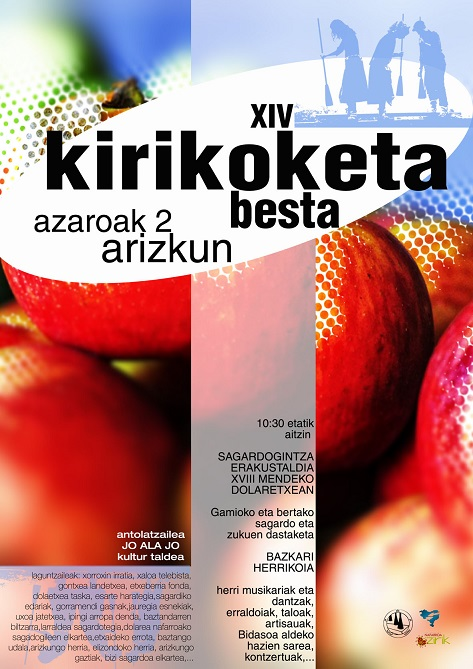
Poster announcing the Kirikoketa Festival

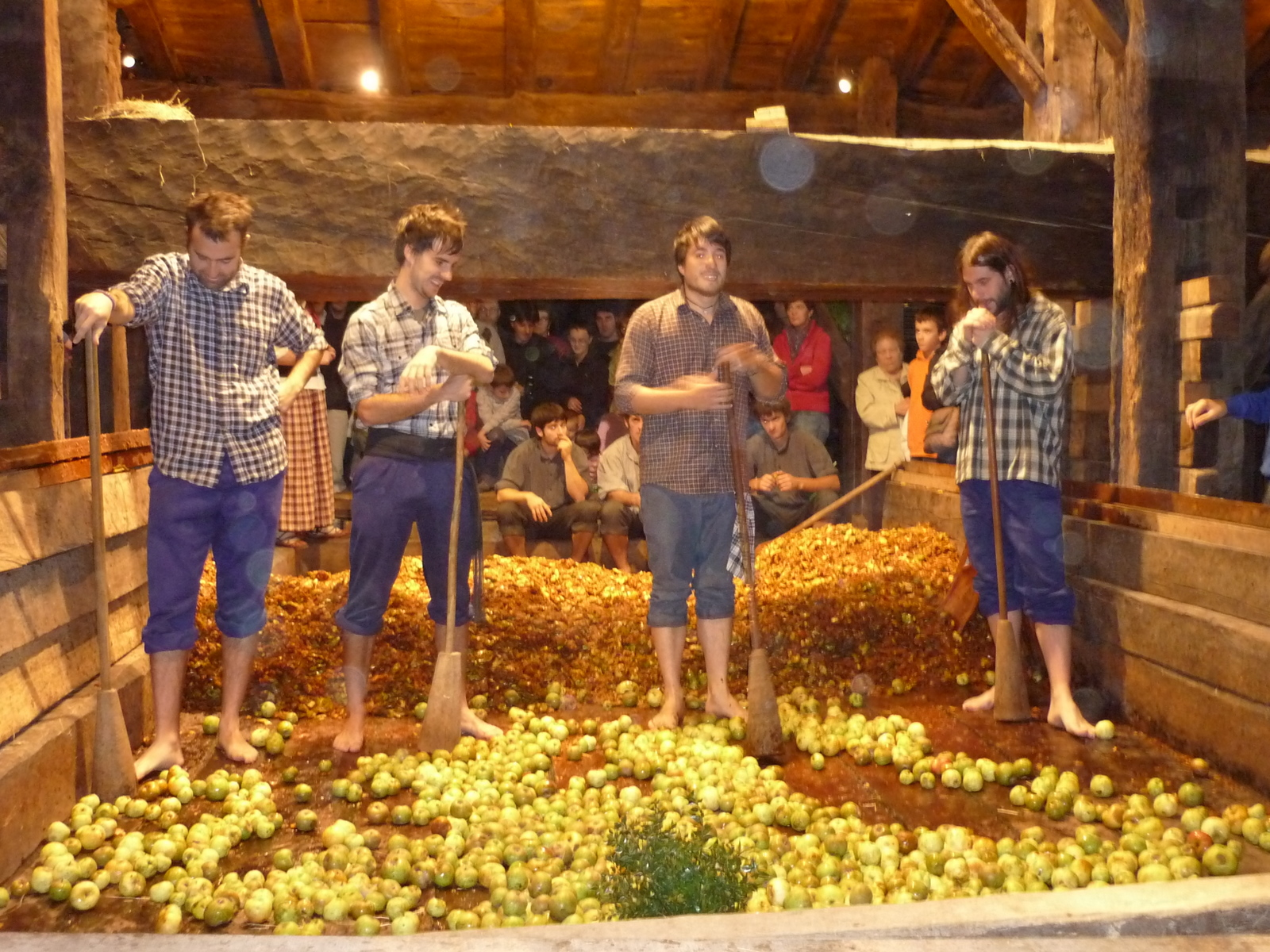
Kirikoketa performed in its original setting, the cider press

Like many other Basque sound instruments and sport activities, the kirikoketa stems from and/or is linked to working activities. This specific instrument comes directly from the apple pressing process in which the fruits are ground down for making cider. Men used to work for some 8 days in this process and on the day, they gathered together in the village market square and celebrated with the tools employed in their work, playing the kirikoketa while singing the following tune along: Kirikoketa, kirikoketa, kirikoketa, koketa, koketa, sagarra jo dela, sagarra jo dela, sagarra jo dela, jo dela, jo dela (accompanying each syllable with a beat).

The inhabitants from the region of the river Bidasoa and Baztan (to the north of Navarre) continued the custom for centuries until it almost died out in the 1920s. Yet thanks to the Basque culture revival and field research carried out by Basque scholars and culture activists, especially since the 1960s, it has enhanced its public profile out of the limbo during the last years, like the renaissance of the txalaparta, though to a far lesser extent.

== Operation ==
The cider-makers originally beat the strikers alternatingly on the cider press in order to crush apples, adopting a playful and rhythmic pattern as a means to enlivening the long process. The pattern remains similar: two or three people standing in front of the board beat it each with a striker, they may move along the board in search of different sounds and try faster/slower and harder/softer beats on it. When there are three people playing, the rhythmic pattern is a ternary one (3/8 time or simple triple). Optionally, a player may choose not to strike on the board on their turn (rest). Alongside the beating performance, the players may engage in singing.

== Festivals and social events ==
Nowadays the festival Kirikoketa Besta is held in Arizkun (Baztan, Navarre) since approx. 2001 and is organized by the Society Jo Ala Jo Elkartea, aimed both at showcasing old cider practices by staging a re-enactment of the cider making process and encouraging the use of the kirikoketa as a musical instrument.
