= Txalaparta =

Musical instrument

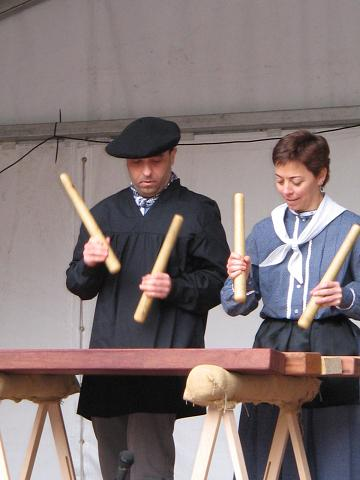
- Classification: Percussion instrument
- Hornbostel–Sachs classification: 111.222 (Sets of percussion plaques)

More articles or information
- Xylophone; laggutu

The txalaparta (Basque pronunciation: [tʃaˈlapaɾta] or [tʃalaˈpaɾta]) is a specialized Basque music device of wood or stone. In some regions of the Basque Country, zalaparta (with [s̻]) means "racket", while in others (in Navarre) txalaparta has been attested as meaning the trot of the horse, a sense closely related to the sound of the instrument.

== Communication ==
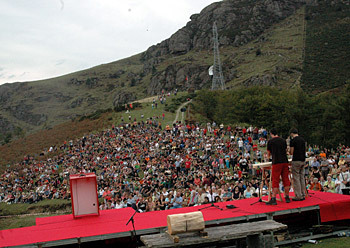
Txalaparta players on the Gudari Eguna (2006).

During the last 150 years, txalaparta has been attested as a communication device used for funeral (hileta), celebration (jai) or the making of slaked lime (kare), or cider (sagardo). After the making of cider, the same board that pressed the apples was beaten to summon the neighbours. Then, a celebration was held and txalaparta played cheerfully, while cider was drunk. Evidence gathered in this cider-making context reveals that sound-emitting ox horns were sometimes blown alongside txalaparta. Actually, cider and cider houses are the only traditional context for the txalaparta we have got to know first-hand. The same background applies to a related Basque percussion instrument, the kirikoketa, a recreation of the pounding used to grind down the apples. Another instrument classified in the same family and geographical area is the toberak.

Some claim that txalaparta has been used this way for millennia, but notwithstanding different assumptions its origins remain shrouded in mystery. It is worth mentioning that the very similar Romanian toacă or Greek semantron are used as a call for prayer, so less epic interpretations link txalaparta with a common Christian practice before the schism between the Catholic Church and the Eastern Orthodox Church. Bells were not used in Christian churches before the 10th century.

== Instrument and music ==
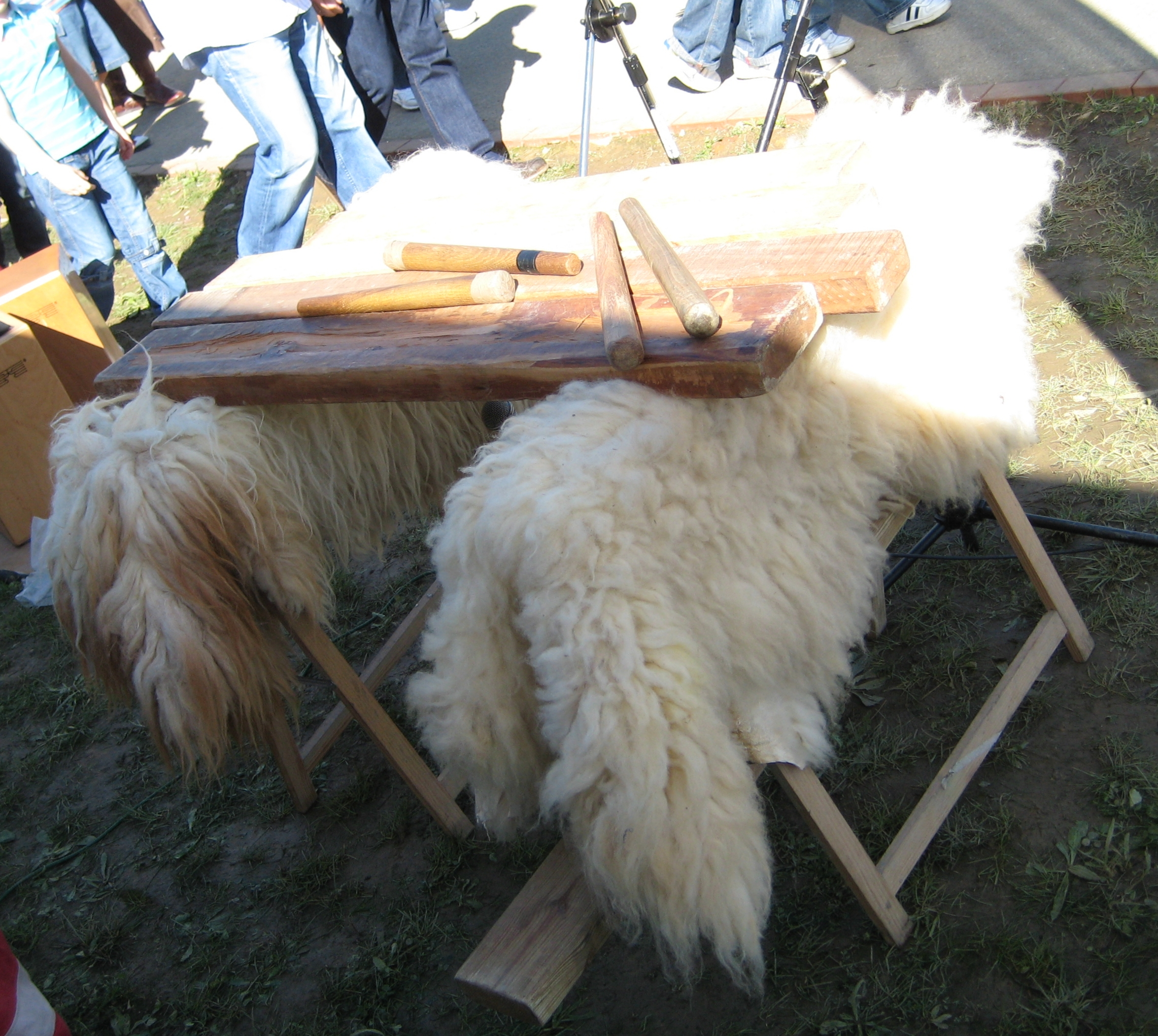
Two board txalaparta

The txalaparta's musical use evolved out of its original use. Traditional txalaparta was almost extinct in the 1950s with a handful of pairs of peasants maintaining the tradition. It was then revived by folklorists, such as Jesus and Jose Antonio Artze from the group Ez dok amairu. Innovators started to labour and assemble the boards to achieve some melody. Other materials started to be pressed into service.

The txalaparta today is a musical instrument used in Basque music. It is classified as an idiophone (a percussion instrument). In its traditional construction (known as the txalaparta zaharra), the txalaparta is made of a pair of long wooden boards held up horizontally on two ends and then beaten vertically with special, thick sticks based on the press handle, the makilak [maˈkiʎak], held upright in the hands. On the two ends, between the long board and the supports, corn husks are placed for vibration.

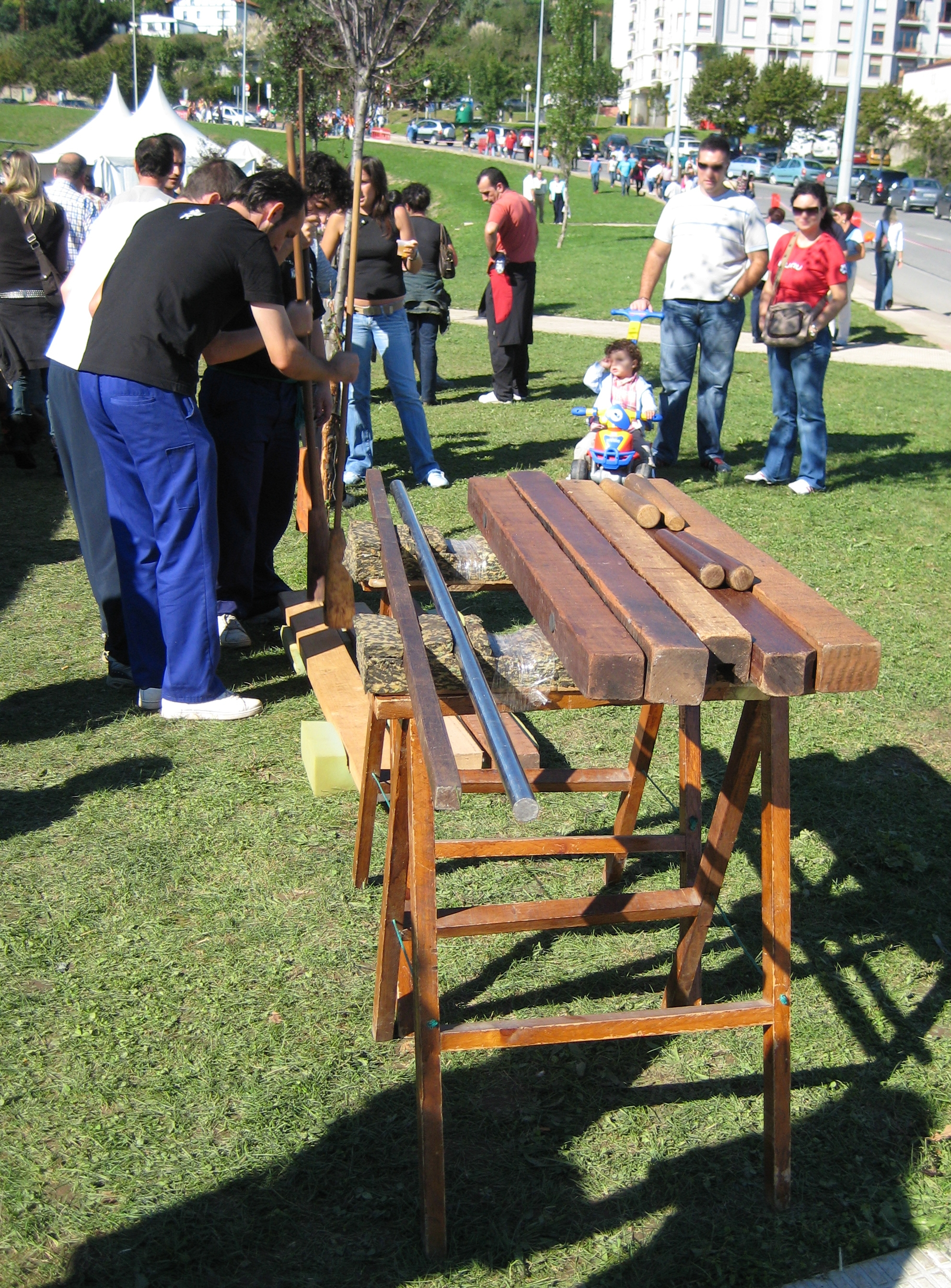
Five-board txalaparta

However, as the txalaparta evolved, that kind of equipment has been phased out and only showcased in special festivals (such as the Txalaparta Festival held in the town of Hernani in May) featuring the former and rural txalaparta set. Actually, nowadays the most usual equipment for the txalaparta consists of two trestles with foam attached to the tops usually wrapped up in various fabrics. As for the boards, they have become increasingly shorter in order to fit the musical needs and convenience of the performers, exactly like the sticks, following that the former 2-odd-metre planks stemming from the old cider press may rarely go beyond 1.50 metres, while the 50 cm sticks or more so the light, easily handled 37.5 cm sticks have become a standard, as opposed to the old-time long and heavy strikers.

The boards, which may number no less than three in modern txalaparta, are laid on the trestles hip-high, while the boards used to be arranged slightly above knee high. The material of the boards has often shifted from locally available timber (chestnut, alder, cherry, etc.) to more beautifully sounding wood from other geographical reaches (Caribbean, West Africa...) such as iroko, sapele, elondo etc. Furthermore, stone (the group Gerla Beti called this variant harriparta) and metal tubes have been added, so widening the range of sounds and contrasts available. In some instances, they have even substituted the customary wooden boards. Big cardboard tubes can be beaten vertically on the floor. It is worth highlighting the manufacture by the group Oreka TX of a txalaparta based on ice blocks on their Scandinavian tour, a making recorded in their 2006 documentary film Nömadak Tx.

== Operation ==
Music is made using the txalaparta by having one or more performers (known as txalapartariak 'txalaparta players' or jotzaileak 'beaters' in Basque or txalapartaris in Spanish) produce differing rhythms, playing with wood knots and spots of the boards for different tones. Nowadays the boards have often been arranged to play notes and even melody along the lines of the score, which may on the one hand further widen for the txalapartaris the possibilities to sophisticate the music. On the other hand, some txalaparta players rule out this novelty as alien to the instrument, essentially rhythmical.

Both players perform consecutively by striking with the sticks on the boards. The performance is played intuitively except for the main lines of the performance, i.e. a rhythmic pattern (binary, ternary), main beat pattern (fours...) etc., which both txalapartaris may agree on in advance of the performance. In addition, ready-made passages may be used embedded in a specific part of the playing, notably at the beginning and the ending. For example, the traditional opening phrase Sagardo Deia, meaning "the Cider Call", is frequently used and easily identifiable with only slight differences from some txalapartaris to others. A pre-established whole composition may be arranged as well, while that kind of playings are rare on bare performances with no accompanying instruments.

Performance quality relies on the coordination between the two players. A strong familiarity between each other's playing style and techniques enables the txalapartaris to play more seamlessly.

== Beats ==
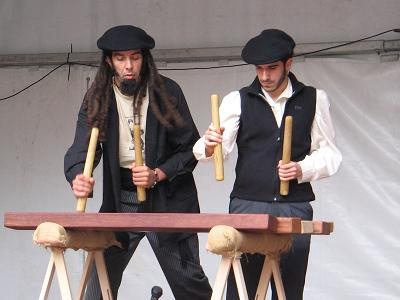
Two txalapartaris playing at a public performance in a festival

There are two distinctive types of beats used on the traditional txalaparta: the ttakuna and the herrena. The former represents the balance (two beats of one of the players), while the latter names the person who tries other combinations that break it or twist it (herrena means limp). However, the person playing the regularity can nowadays become a balance-breaker, so triggering an argument between both sides of the performance that struggle to restore the balance.

The basics of txalaparta is quite simple as regards the rhythm. Within a binary scheme the player's choice was originally to play two beats each with a different stick, a single beat or none. When no beat is played on the boards, it is called hutsunea (rest), or it can be played once, and if the performer opts to strike all two possible beats, then it is ttakuna, named after the two onomatopoeic sounds emitted. These choices apply currently to both players.

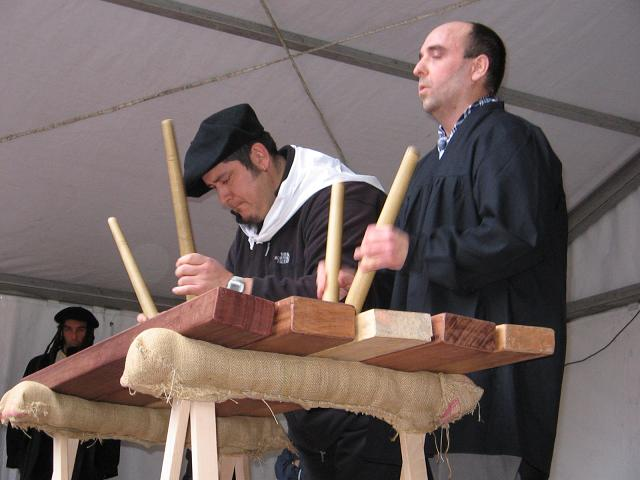
Txalapartaris down to business

Yet the binary pattern belongs to the traditional txalaparta (despite qualified remarks that point to a wider rhythmical range, see below), so when the instrument was carried from the couple of farmhouses it was confined to over to wider Basque cultural circles, the txalaparta evolved into more sophisticated rhythms and combinations, such as the ternary pattern. In that pattern, each player may use their own time lapse to play three even strikes on the boards (ttukuttuna), or any other combination available, e.g. strike - rest - strike, strike - rest- rest, etc. (a sort of 6/8 time). As for the order of the hands, the first and the third beat may usually be struck with the same stick, so creating a pendulum like, come-and-go motion with the arms.

Starting out from those two schemes, all other modalities developed, e.g. fours (four possible even beats per each player, which may be described as four semiquavers in 2/4 time) or the so-called Papua pattern, among others, where while sticking to a ternary pattern the players add a fourth strike onto the lapse of time belonging to their mate by overlapping their first strike, resulting in a stressed beat repeated every turn of a player that conjures up a tribal like movement.

== Players ==
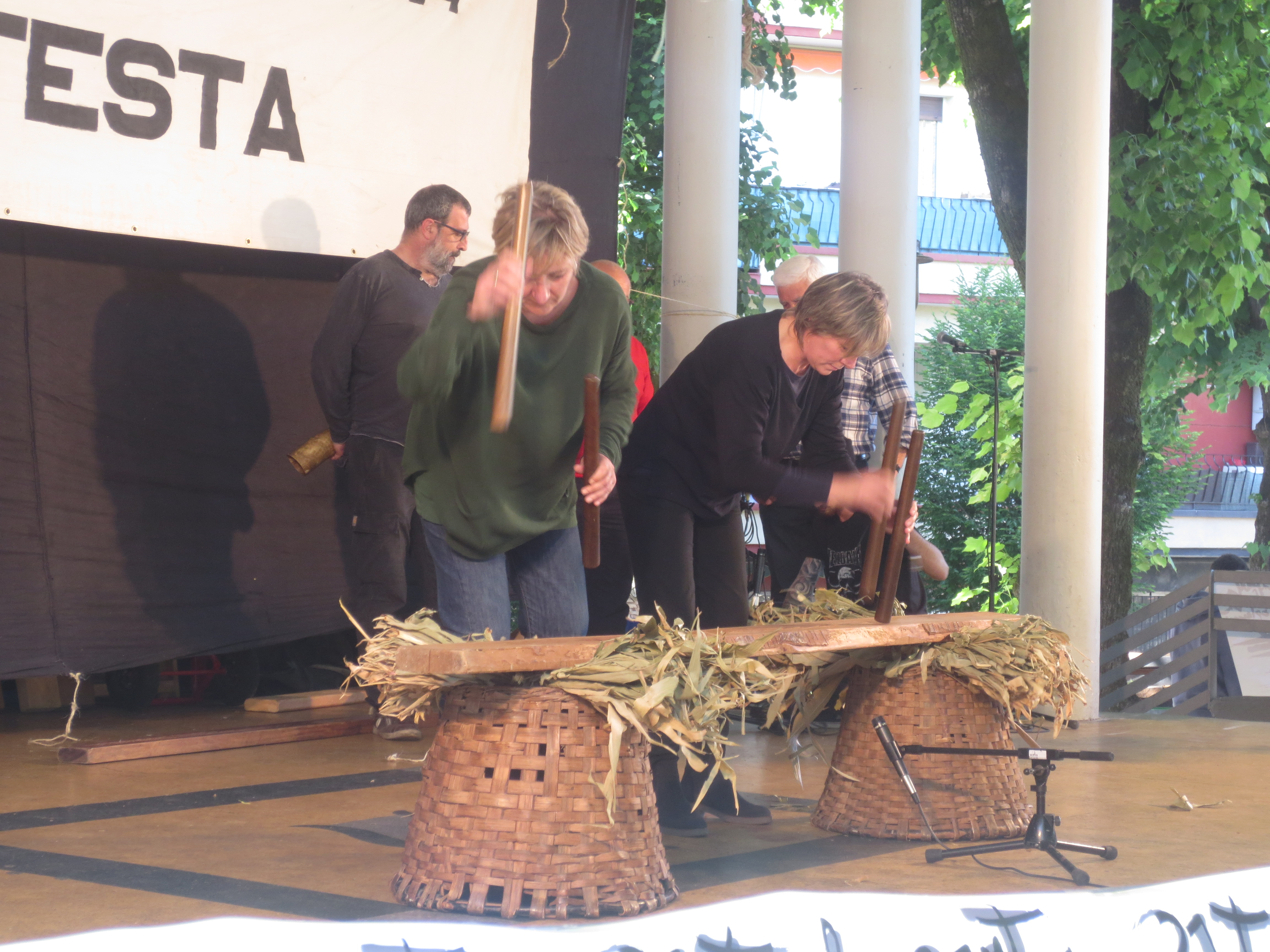
Txalaparta old style (2017)

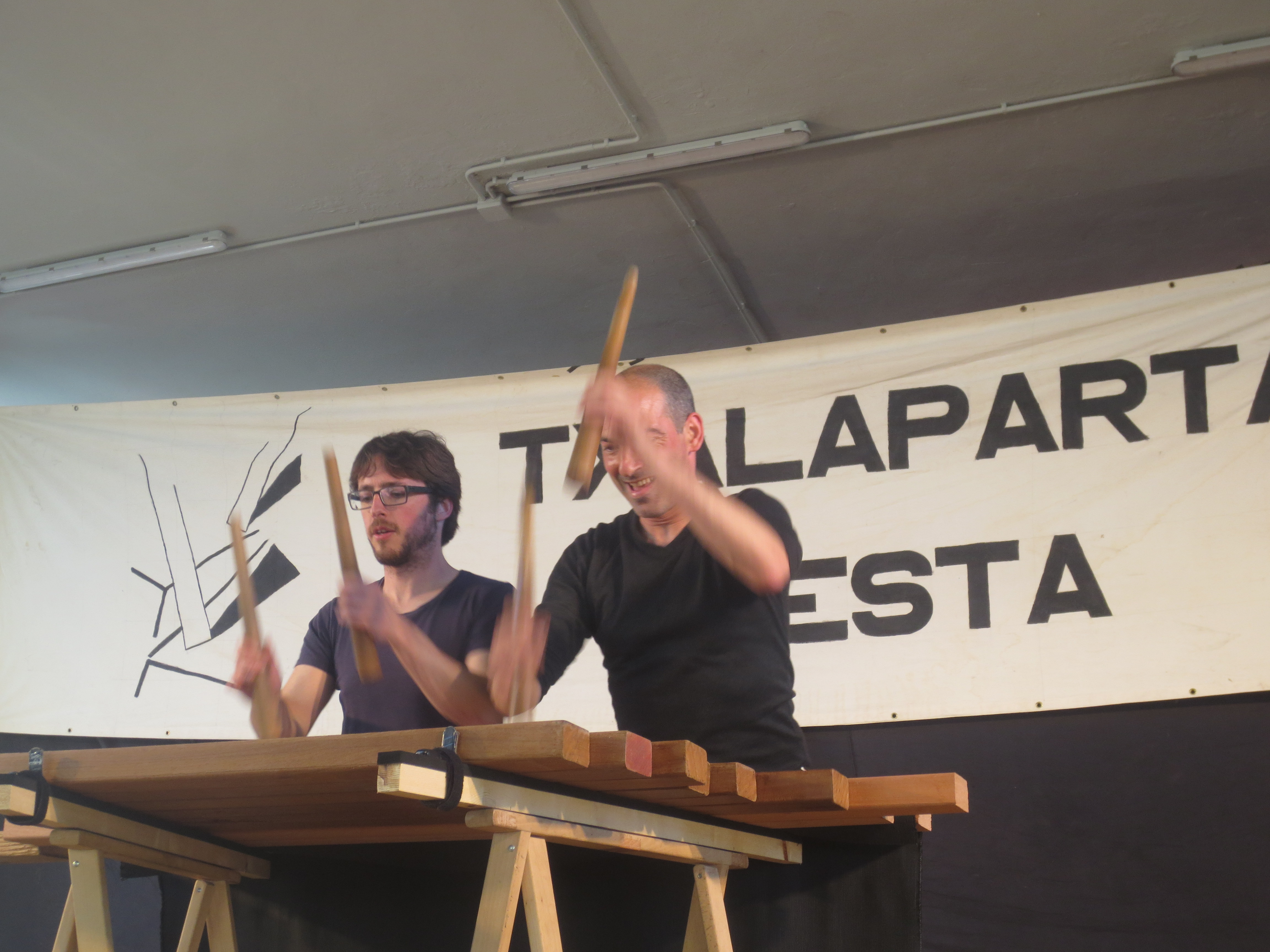
Txalaparta pair Kimu, at full steam in Hernani

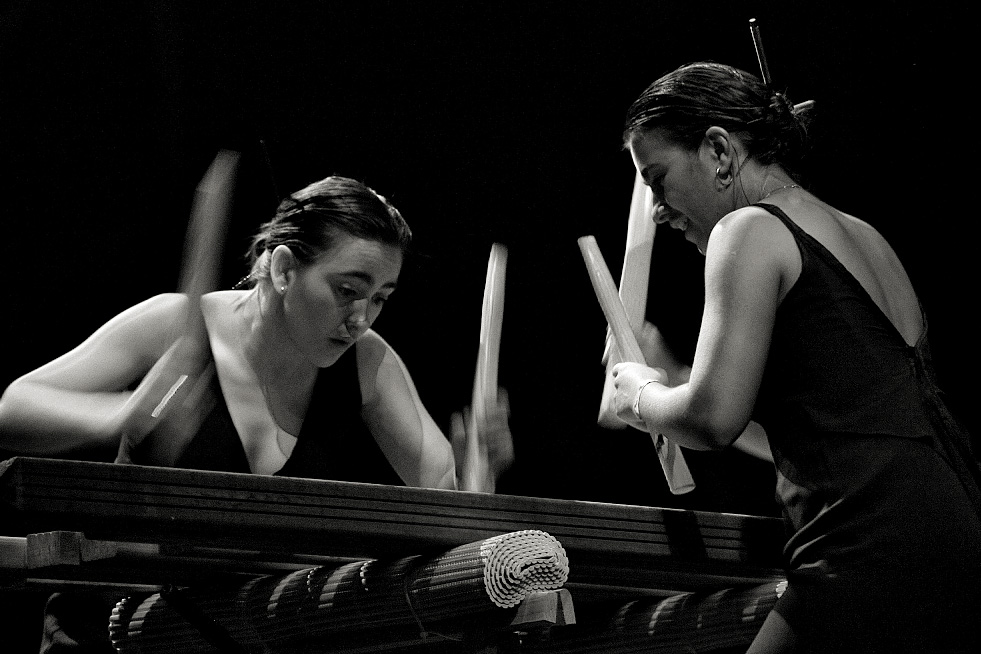
Ttukunak (Maika and Sara Gomez) playing the txalaparta at Moers Festival 2008

Txalaparta was about to die out when it was called back from the cold limbo by activists concerned with the Basque culture. By then, only a few players remained, namely, Miguel and Pello Zuaznabar (Lasarte), Asentsio and Ramon Goikoetxea (Astigarraga), Jose and Jose Mari Zabalegi (Martutene), who every so often performed traditional txalaparta. In the 60s, in step with the Basque cultural and musical revival movement, Josean and Juan Mari Beltran, a founder of the School of Hernani himself, took up txalaparta and encouraged its expansion. Another pair of brothers teaming up to play txalaparta were Jexux and Jose Anton Artze, who should be considered within the wider framework of the Ez dok amairu cultural movement, made up notably of musicians, poets and theoreticians of the Basque culture (Jorge Oteiza...).

After establishing the School of Hernani, a steady expansion of txalaparta ensued in the 80s among younger generations and out to other regions of the Basque Country. The Txalaparta Festival was established in 1987, adding to the interest for the instrument and acting as a showcase for fresh trends. Josu Goiri should be cited here, from Arrigorriaga, who adopted a fairly mystical approach on the instrument and has released several books on the topic. Another significant couple that got together in the 80s is Gerla Beti, standing for Perdi and Ruben, from Araia. They started to try new materials with the txalaparta.

In the 90s and later, new couples have come out from the txalaparta school network linked to the Txalaparta School of Hernani in the area of San Sebastián, besides establishing new schools and workshops all over the Basque Country. A few txalaparta projects of this period worth highlighting:

- Tomas San Miguel (Gerla Beti): The piano and accordion player teams up with Gerla Beti and they perform together since 1984. In 1994, the album Lezao is released featuring txalaparta to critical acclaim. Two further txalaparta related albums have been released since, Ten (1996) and Dan-Txa (2005), so wrapping up the trilogy. In this latest album, the swinging duo Ttukunak, i.e. young twin sisters Maika and Sara Gomez, has taken over the sticks from Gerla Beti.
- Ttakunpa: In 2003, the 8-people group releases an album under the same name. They feature a txalaparta made of wood and marble blended with various African (Mali, Senegal...) percussion instruments, songs and influences, such as djembes, kenkenis, sanbaghs.
- Felipe and Imanol Ugarte: After taking up txalaparta at the beginning of the 90s, Felipe trains brother Imanol and in no time they start playing in the streets and festivals. They are renowned for their performances at the Donostia Boulevard in summer, they have toured several times all over the world and have edited a couple of albums under their own label. The brothers also perform live regularly with the group Crystal Fighters.
- Oreka TX ("Balance Tx(alaparta)"): Igor Otxoa and Harkaitz Martinez de San Vicente team up late in the 90s out of other couples and join the Kepa Junkera band in his concerts and album releases, mostly playing along with trikitixa accordions and other folk instruments of the ensemble. They feature a txalaparta tuned along the notes of a score (melody) and made of exotic wood. After a period of rest, under the patronage of Kepa Junkera they draw up the album Quercus Endorphina (2000) with the contribution of many celebrated folk musicians, e.g. Phil Cunningham. Then, they engage in a more independent project, taking to travel to various countries (India, Finland...) trying to blend txalaparta with other instruments and cultures, with a view to highlighting diversity and mutual comprehension among the peoples of the world. The result of the experience, the documentary Nomadak TX (2006), proved an outright success, earning them numerous awards in Film Festivals around the world.

== Discussion and prospects ==
It has been a general assumption that txalaparta evolved out of a simple binary pattern. Yet in an interview to Juan Mari Beltran, a pundit on the issue that did major field work and has afterwards elaborated on the topic, he holds that ttukuttunas (three-strike sets), even fours, were occasionally played by the last old txalaparta performers. Notwithstanding this comment, it may be contended that they were not ternary or four-strike patterns, but isolated ready-made beat sets inserted in an otherwise simple binary pattern.

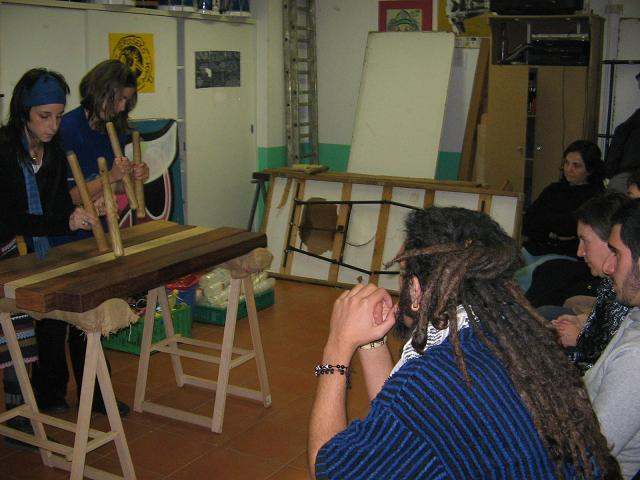
Giving it a try in a txalaparta class

As regards melody in txalaparta, the issue turns out contentious to some degree, due to the rhythmic nature of the instrument. During the last years, txalaparta has broken new ground by playing along other instruments, interacting with them, following that the txalaparta has sometimes been tuned for melody to fit in the ensemble. On the one hand, not only accompanies it other instruments by contributing to the bassline, but it also provides melody arranged in advance, which entails establishing the playing beforehand. Therefore, some argue that doing so it is taking on a xylophone-like role devoid of its own primary musical features at the expense of adopting a subsidiary and decorating function, e.g. txalaparta in Kepa Junkera's band.

On the other hand, txalaparta has kept a higher profile in other musician groupings that have clustered around the instrument, where it has blended in with other percussion instruments alien to the country (djembe, triangle..., e.g. the group Ttakunpa), or rubbing shoulders side by side with autochthonous and foreign melodic instruments, like trikitixa, alboka, accordion or keyboards, while clinging to its rhythmic nature. To summarize, the rhythm/melody issue remains tricky.

Thanks to groups that have sprung up all over the Basque Country, txalaparta has spread out of its original haven in the School of Hernani into all directions, even outside the Basque Country. Besides extending geographically, txalaparta and its performers have soaked up the cultural trends of modern society and mixed with other music coming from different parts of the world, resulting in cultural melange. Additionally, new technologies allow for experimentation and complementarity that used to be simply unfeasible. Multimedia performances with txalaparta that mix images and sound are not unheard of, as well as DJs playing with txalapartaris, featured for one in the Txalaparta Festival of Hernani.

== Miscellaneous ==
In a pursuit to get the most out of the materials, experimentation has been taken to new levels, like in the cavern of Mendukilo (Navarre), where site-specific txalaparta music recording provides a background for visits (as of March 2008) based on sounds created by playing with elements from the very grotto.

Beyond the boundaries of music, the sculptor native from Usurbil (Gipuzkoa) Jose Luis Elexpe «Pelex» has turned txalaparta into the subject of his work. Himself a pupil of the renowned txalaparta player Jexux Artze, the exhibition opened at Usurbil in May 2008 attempts to cross over the immovability of Elexpe's discipline. Besides wood, metal is used to fashion figures representing txalapartaris, as well as playing with black&white, on the one hand, and colours, on the other, to stress different approaches.
