= Lagguti =

Azerbaijani folk instrument

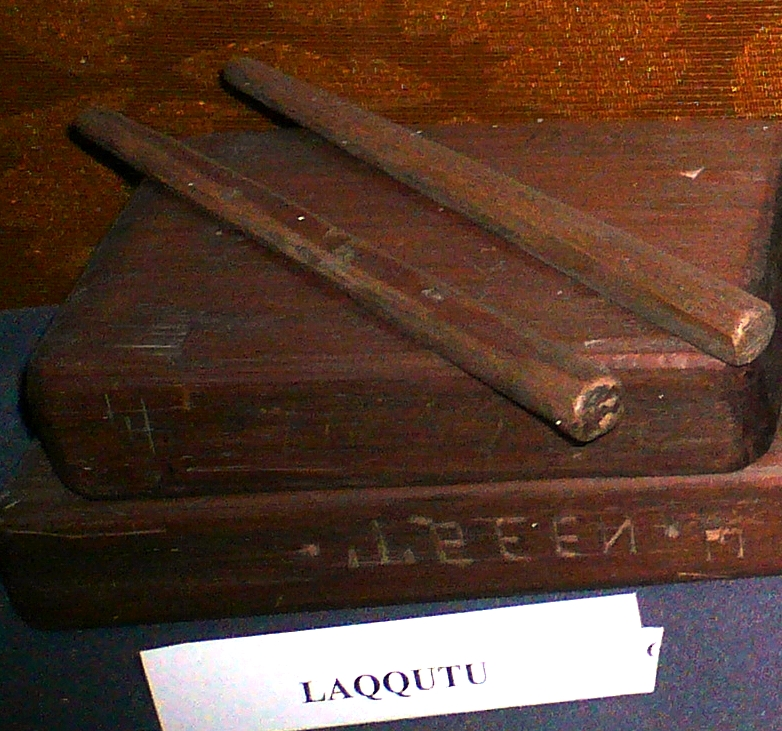
- Classification: Percussion instrument
- Hornbostel–Sachs classification: 111.2 (percussion idiophones)

More articles or information
- Nagara (drum); Txalaparta; Xylophone

The Lagguti, Lakto, or Laggutu is a Talysh folk percussion slit drum instrument performed in southern regions of Azerbaijan: Lerik, Astara, Lankaran, Masalli and Jalilabad.

"Just like the naghara, gosha naghara, gaval and other percussion instruments, the lagguti is widely used in modern ensembles and orchestras of national instruments." A rectangular wooden chamber, "the lagguti is placed on a platform," which may also serve as a resonator, "and the performer plays it with two wooden sticks. Usually, the lagguti is 250x125x50 mm in size and made of walnut, apricot, mulberry or beech wood." The thickness of the sides or walls varies, which produces differences in timbre and/or pitch, with the bottom generally being thicker than the top.

In the middle of the 19th century, "lagguti" was used as a musical instrument in the life of the Talysh. Lagguti as a percussion instrument attracted the attention of researchers of folklore much later - in the 1980s of the twentieth century.
