= Herrena and ttakuna =

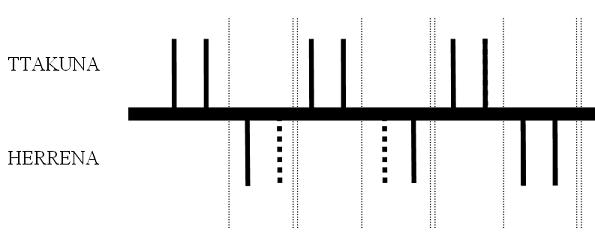
Three "rounds" of a simple score for the txalaparta: binary beats are represented by sticks; a dotted stick means a rest (non-played beat).

Herrena (IPA: [e'rena]) is one of the parts performed by the traditional txalaparta players, the other one being the ttakuna; another lesser known traditional term for herrena is urguna. The herrena is opposed to the ttakuna in that it breaks the balance the latter intends to maintain (hence the name herrena, meaning lame). Their rhythmic choices consist of two beats (a regular ttakuna), a single beat (sometimes called herrena by extension) or a rest, as opposed to the ttakuna, who may always strike twice.

Yet the rigid boundaries between the herrena and the ttakuna have melted away in modern txalaparta, so much so that the ttakuna players may perform themselves combinations belonging to the herrena.

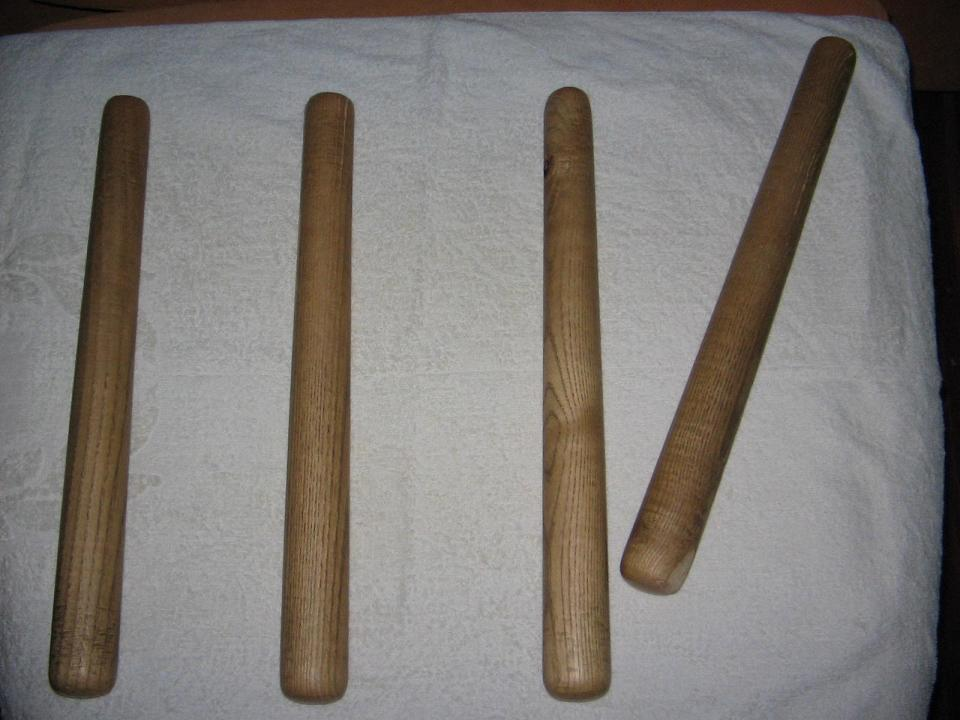
Four sticks in a row

The ttakuna (pronounced [caˈkuna]) or txakuna [tʃaˈkuna], is a basic two beat pounding played by each player of the txalaparta with the sticks. It provides the grounds for the traditional txalaparta alongside the herrena within a binary pattern. In that instrument, played by two performers, each one takes on a part on the performance, either the ttakuna or the herrena. The ttakuna represents the balance or the regularity, meaning that this performer shall steadily play two even beats on the boards when it is their turn. However, the herrena may choose to play the ttakun too as they please.

These two beats are fairly even in the traditional txalaparta, with a slight stress on the first strike, but it's not uncommon listening to ttakunas being performed markedly tilted to the second beat (resulting in an emphasized second beat), driven by inertia.

On the strength of the development the txalaparta has gone through, these boundaries between the two parts played by each performer have gradually eased off, and the person playing ttakuna may break their part and alternate with other combinations (e.g. a single beat or a rest), so destabilizing the former balance and starting off a dialectical struggle between both players.
