= Semantron =

Percussion instrument used in monasteries

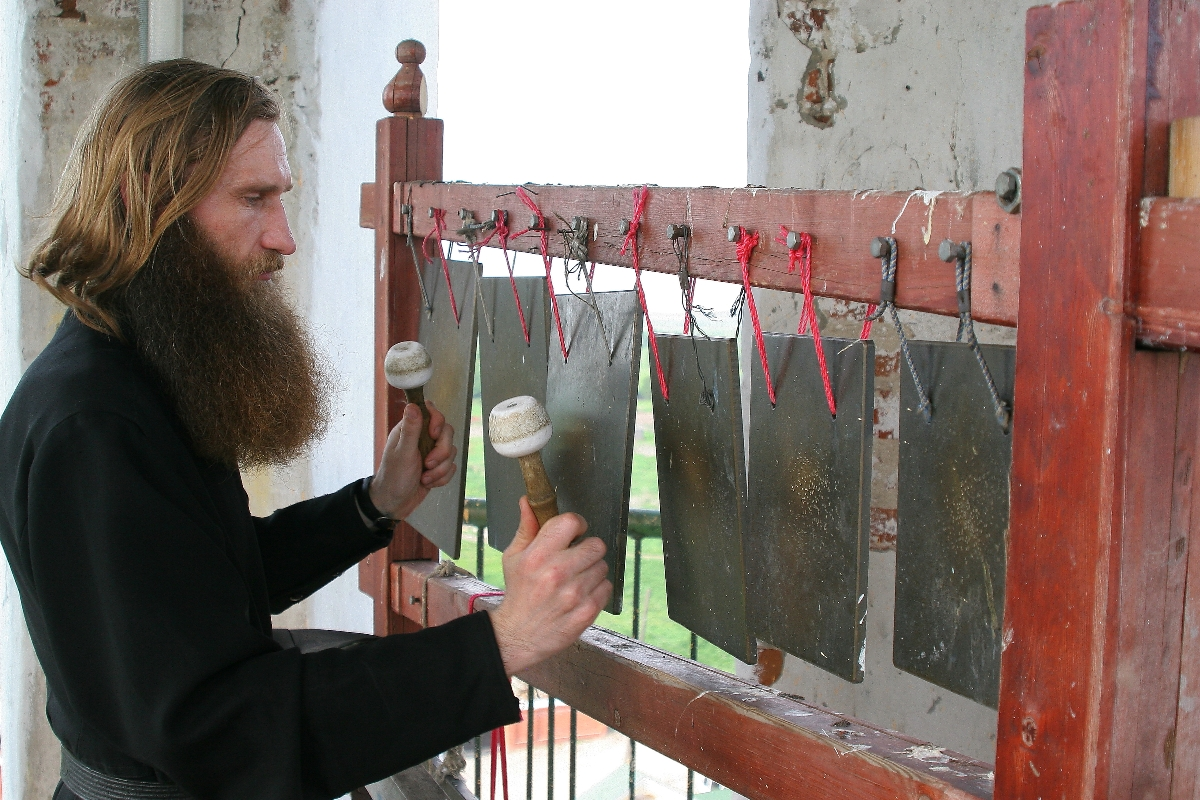
A Russian monk playing a semantron

The semantron (Greek: σήμαντρον) is a percussion instrument used in Eastern, Oriental Orthodox and Eastern Catholic monasteries to summon the monastics to prayer or at the start of a procession.

It is also known as a semandron, semanteriom (σημαντήριον), simantra (σήμαντρα), xylon (ξύλον) and talanto (ταλαντο). In other languages, it is called as follows: Romanian: toacă; Russian: било, bilo; Bulgarian, Macedonian, Serbian: клепало, klepalo; Arabic: ناقوس, nāqūs; Armenian: կոչնակ, kochnak or gochnag.

== Description ==
The instrument comes in three main varieties: portable, consisting of a long wooden plank held in the player's non-dominant hand and struck with a wooden mallet in the dominant; a larger, heavier, fixed timber block suspended by chains and struck by one or two mallets; and a fixed metal variety, often horseshoe-shaped and struck by a metal mallet.

The semantra are usually suspended by chains from a peg in the proaulion (porch of the catholicon) or perhaps outside the refectory door, or on a tree in the courtyard.

=== Portable wooden-made ===
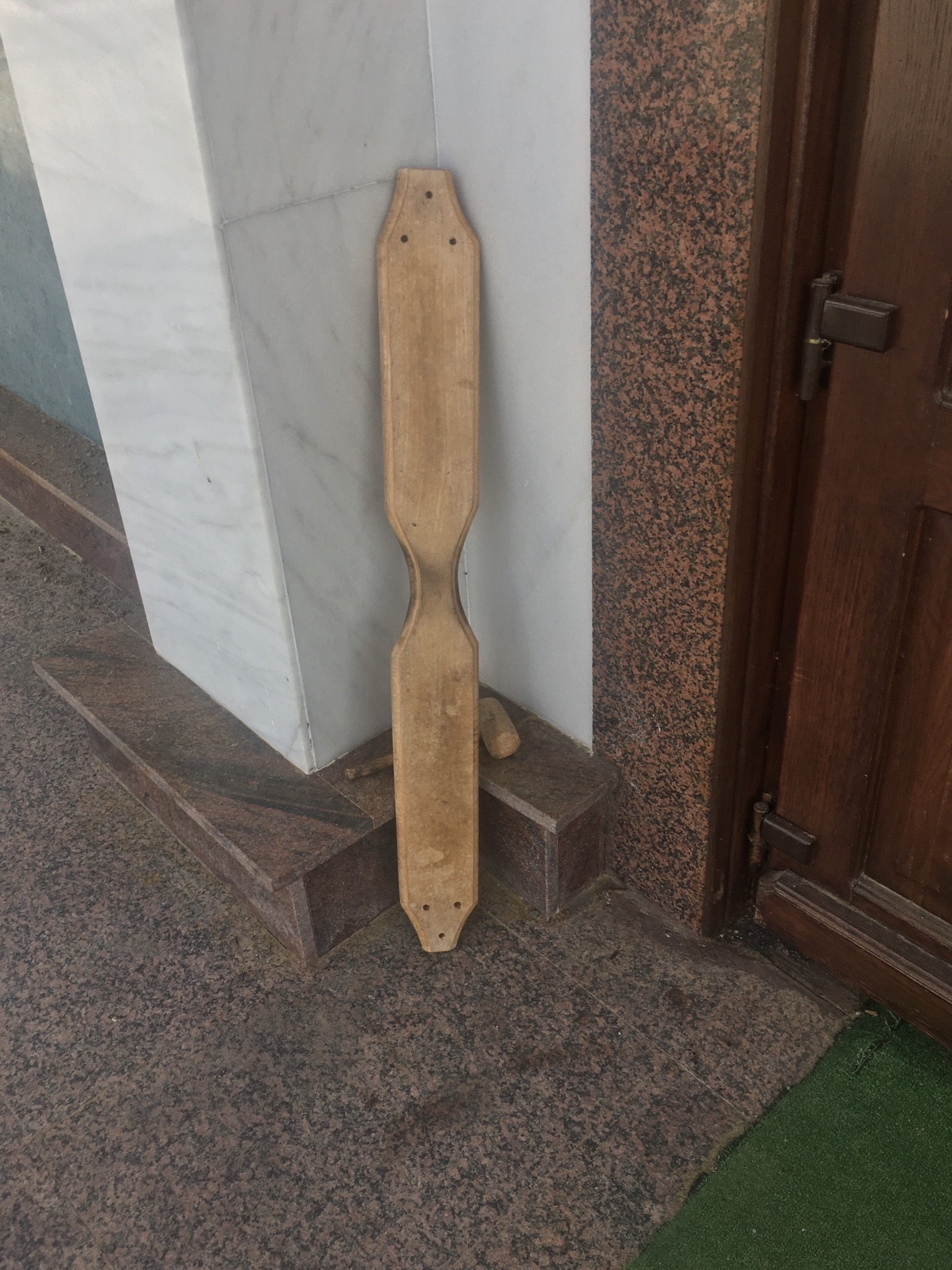
A portable semantron at Mușunoaiele Monastery, Fitionești, Romania. The mallet is visible behind the plank.

In the portable wooden form, at the centre of the instrument's length, each edge is slightly scooped out to allow the player to grasp it by the left hand, while he or she holds a small wooden (or sometimes iron) mallet in the right, with which to strike it in various parts and at various angles, eliciting loud, somewhat musical sounds (κροῦσμα, krousma). Although simple, the instrument nonetheless produces a strong resonance and a variety of different intonations, depending on the thickness of the place struck and the intensity of the force used, so that quite subtle results can be obtained.

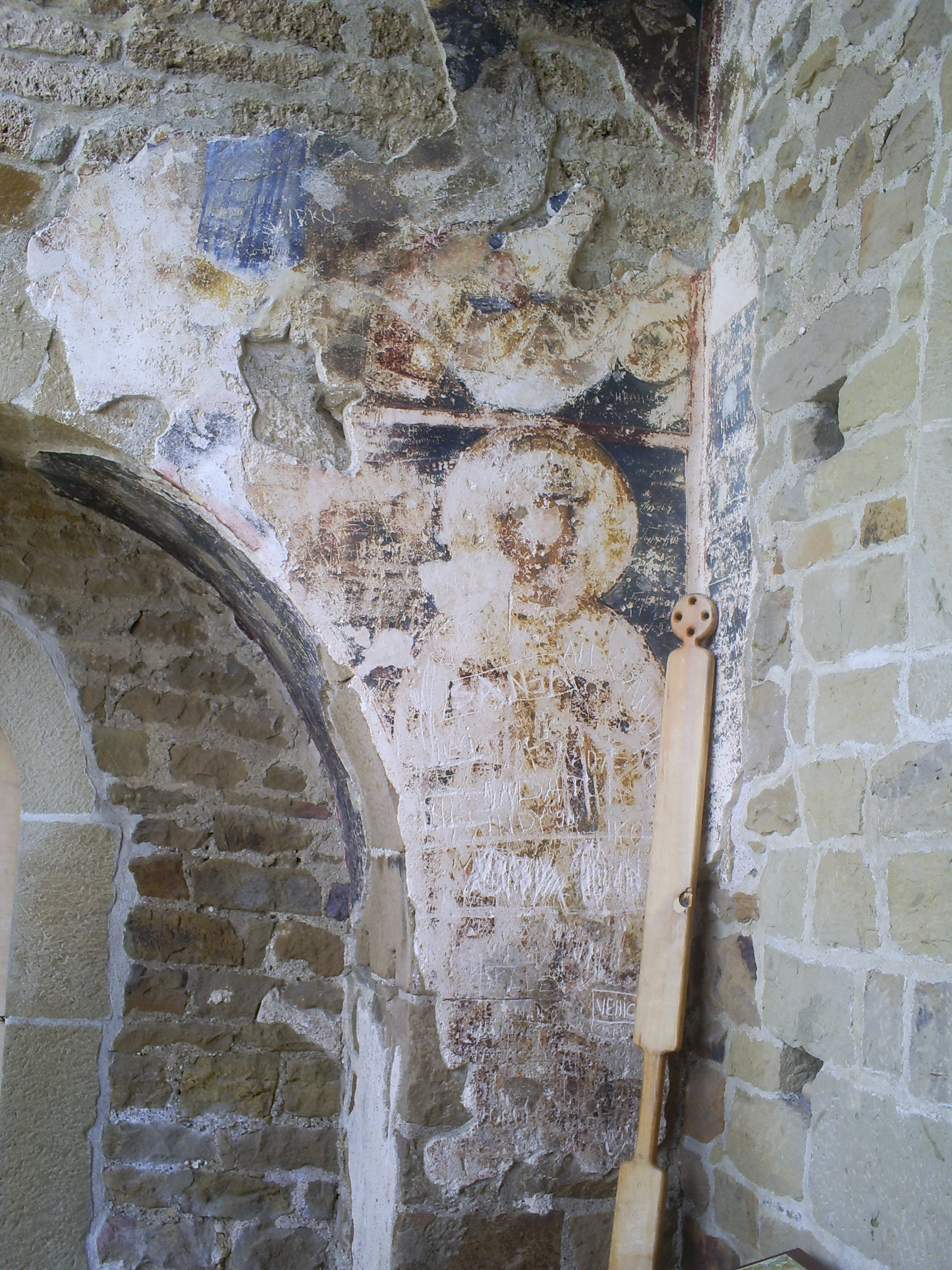
A portable wooden semantron standing in the catholicon of Djurdjevi Monastery, Serbia

=== Fixed wooden-made ===
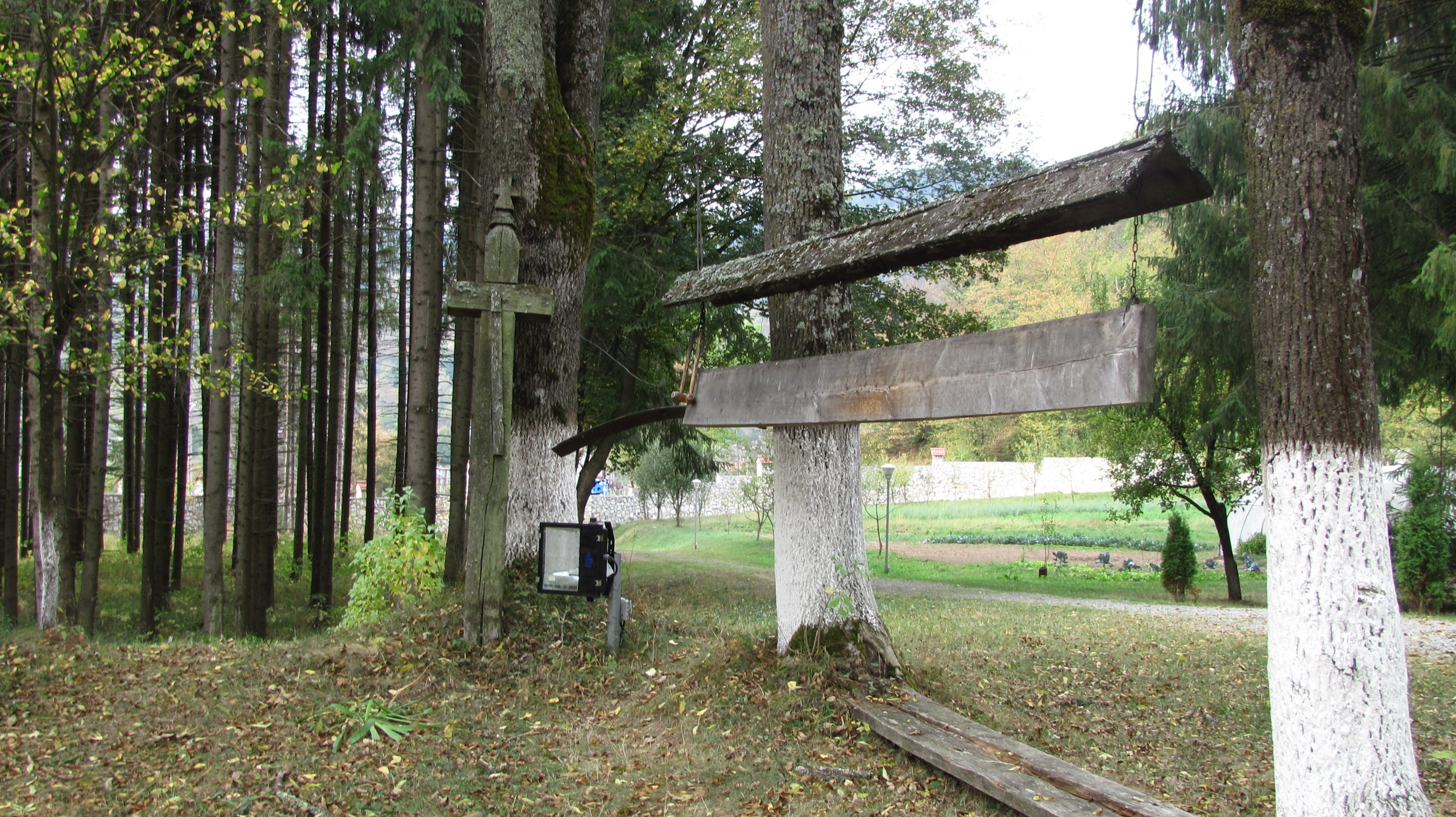
Fixed wooden semantron at Lupșa Monastery, Romania

The fixed wooden semantron is made of a long, well-planed piece of timber, usually heart of maple (but also beech), from 12 feet (3.7 m) and upwards in length, by 1 1/2 feet (46 cm) broad, and 9 inches (23 cm) in thickness.

=== Metal-made ===
A metal semantron, smaller than those of wood, is usually hung near the entrance of the catholicon (the monastery's main church). The metal variety is made of iron or brass (ἁγιοσίδηρα, hagiosidera / клепало, klepalo); formed of slightly curved metal plates, these give out a sound not unlike that of a gong.

== Use ==
In the traditional monastic ritual, before each service the assigned player takes a wooden semantron and, standing before the west end of the catholicon, strikes on it three hard and distinct blows with the mallet. He then proceeds round the outside of the church, turning to the four quarters and playing on the instrument by striking blows of varying force on different parts of the wood at uneven intervals, always winding up the "tune" with three blows similar to those at the beginning. Where there is a metal semantron, it is customary to strike it after the wooden one has been played. The semantron is sounded every midnight for night offices (Midnight Office and Matins); this is done by the candle-lighter (κανδηλάπτης, kandilaptis).

== Gallery ==
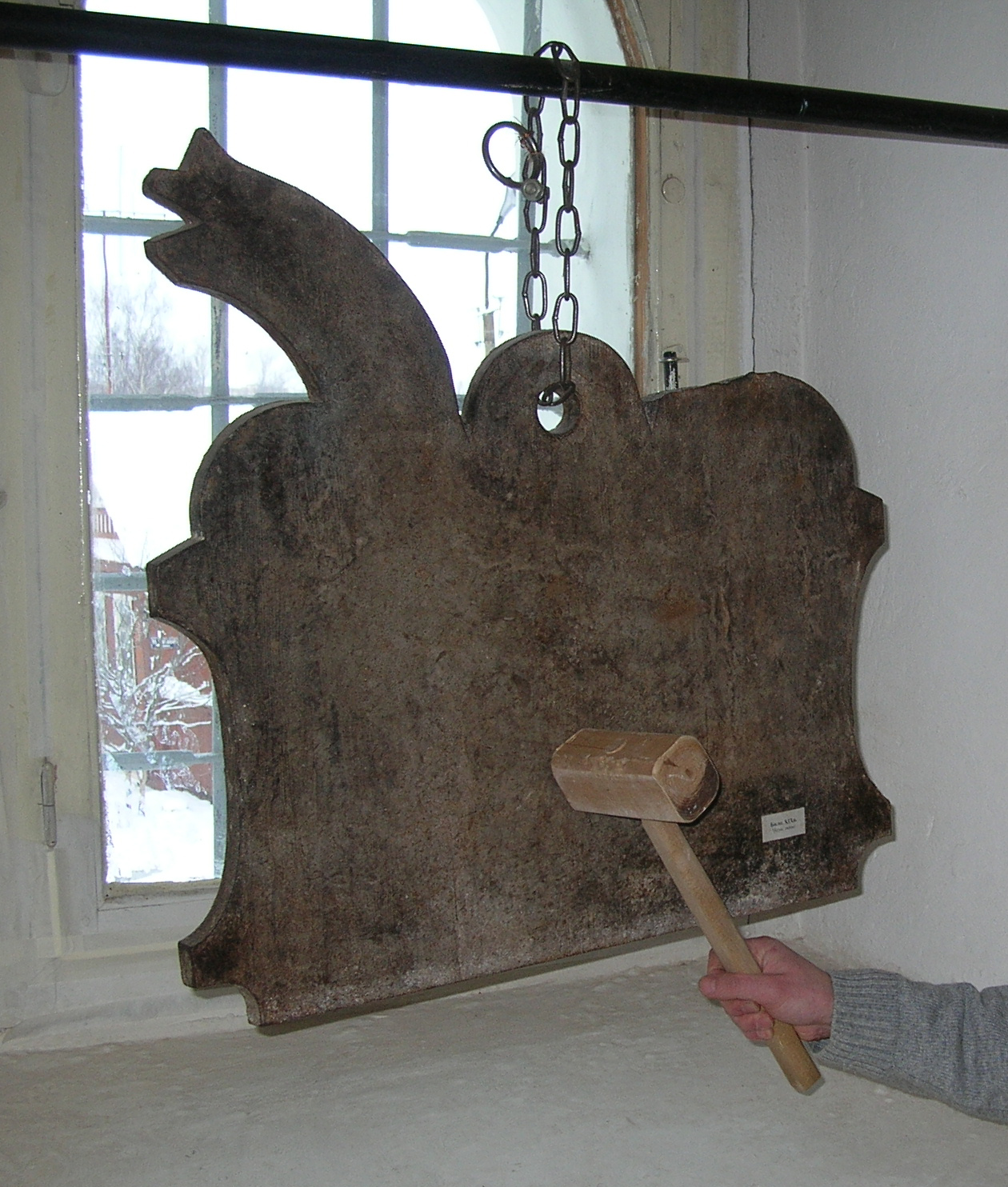
A wooden semantron in Staraya Russa museum, Russia

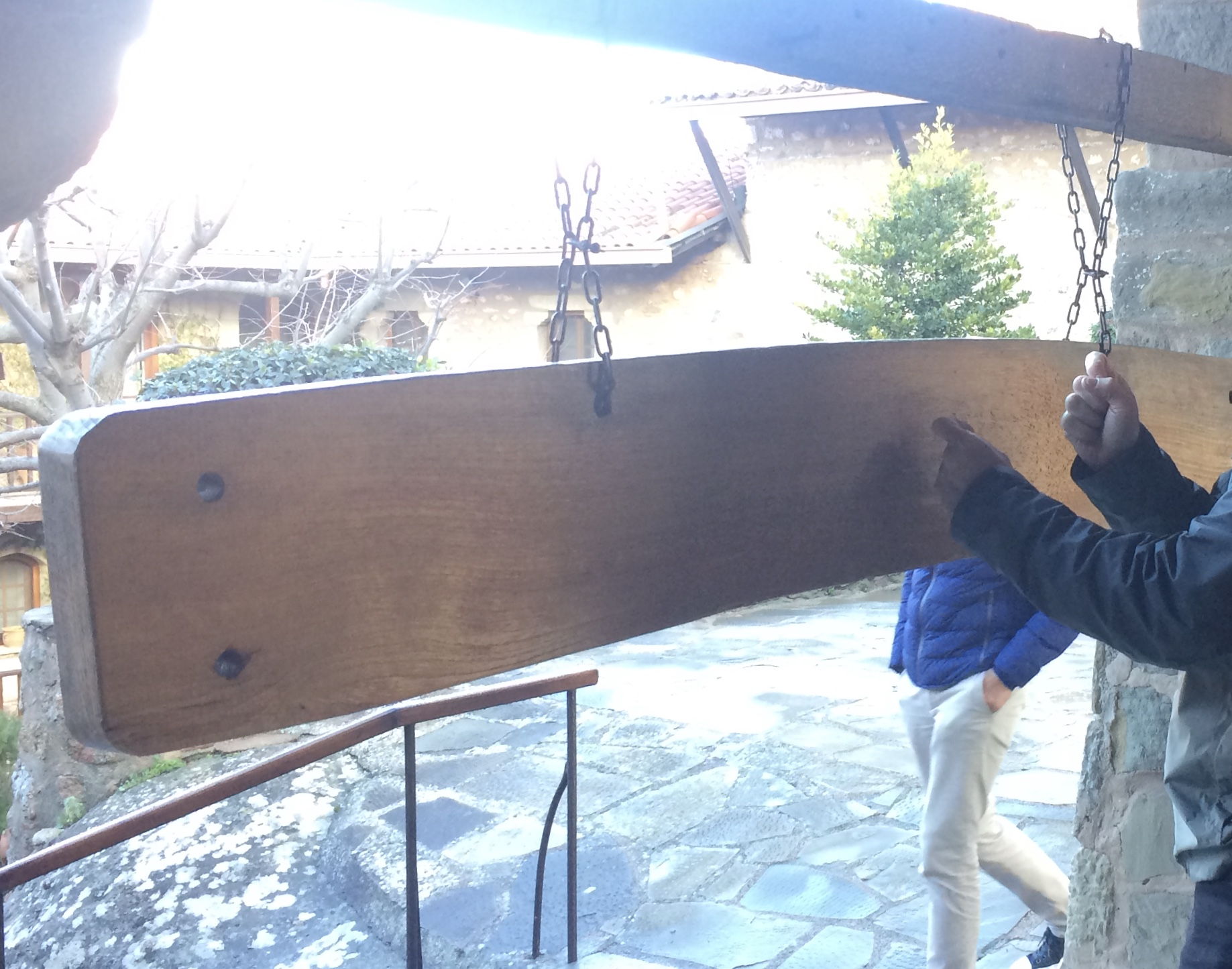
A fixed wooden semantron at the Monastery of St. Stephen, Meteora, Greece

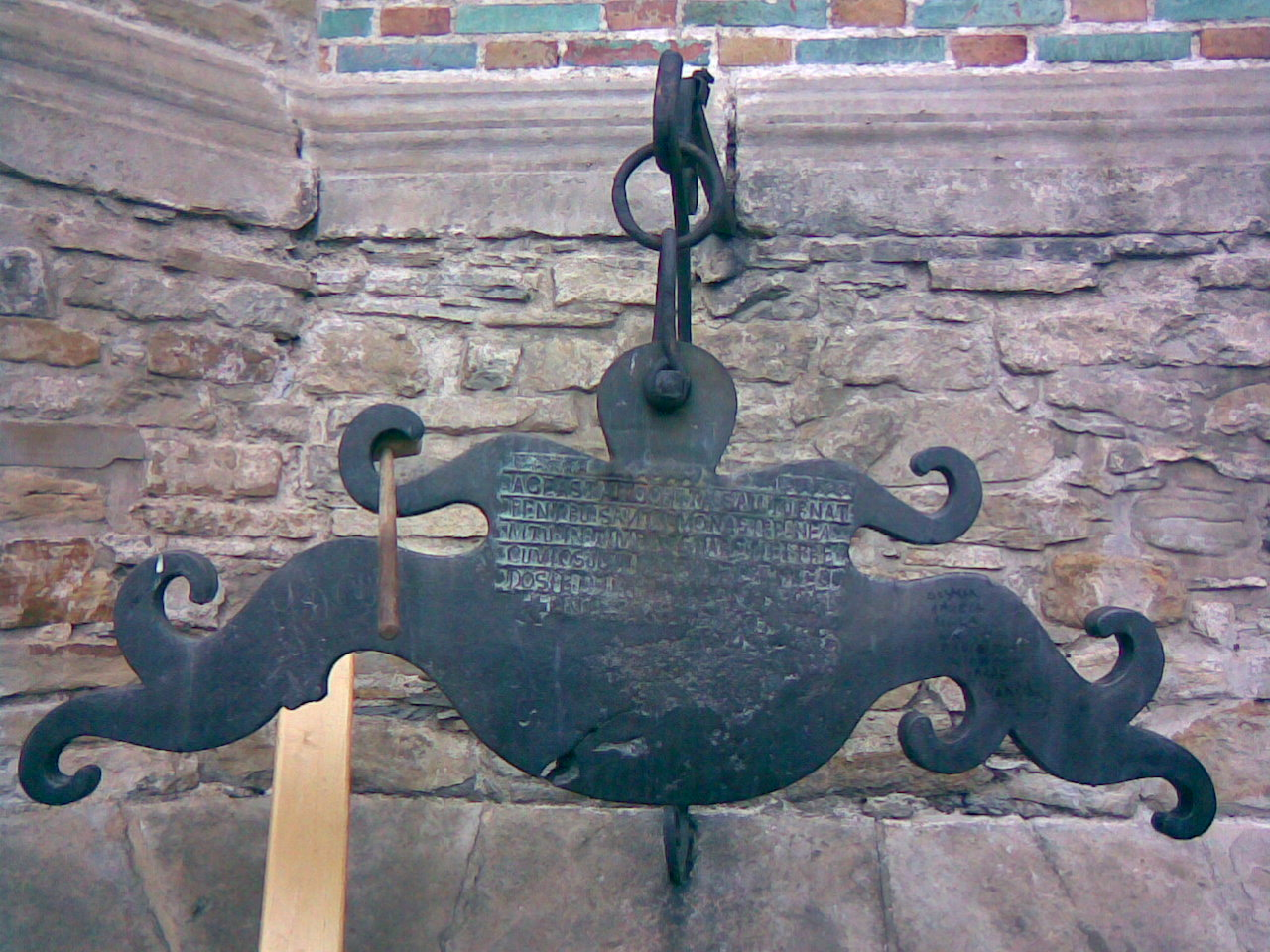
A metal semantron hanging at Neamţ Monastery, Romania

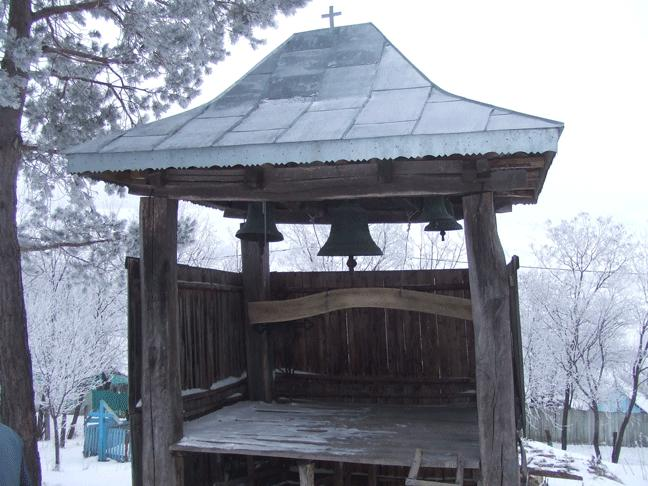
A fixed wooden semantron beneath bells at Căpuşneni church, Romania

== History ==
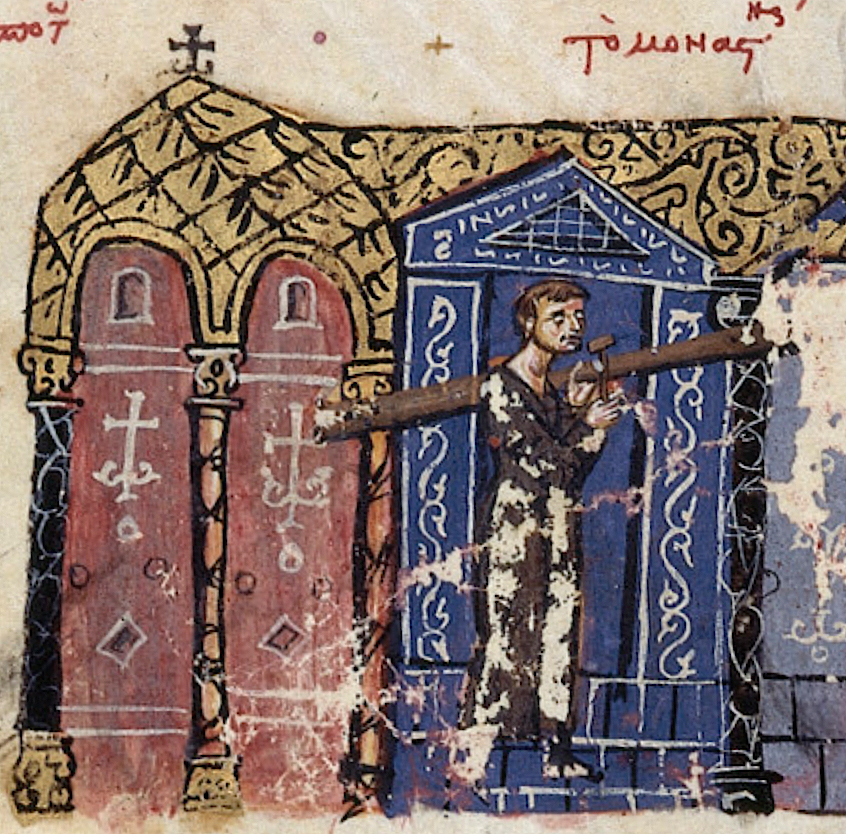
12th-13th century A.D., Sicily. A man plays the semantron, detail of larger artwork from the Madrid Skylitzes, Madrid, National Library, codex vitr. 26-2, folio 28v.

=== Origin & Byzantine rite ===
While continuing in daily use at monasteries and sometimes featuring at funerals for their deep notes sounded at long intervals, as well as at other services, semantra have played a long-lasting part in Orthodox history. Their origin has been traced to at least the beginning of the 6th century, when the semantron had replaced the trumpet as the agent of convocation in the monasteries of Palestine and Egypt, including Saint Catherine's in the Sinai; the rhythms struck on wood were soon vested with the aural memory of rhythmic blasts from earlier trumpets, an iconography of trumpeting that was eventually transferred to the zvon of Russian bells.

Of Levantine and Egyptian origin, its use flourished in Greece and specifically on Mount Athos before spreading among Eastern Orthodox regions in what are now Bulgaria, Romania, Moldova, Serbia, Montenegro, Bosnia and Herzegovina and North Macedonia. It both predates and substitutes for bells, which were, according to one account, first introduced to the East in 865 by the Venetians, who gave a dozen to Emperor Michael III, being used to call worshipers to prayer.

The joy shown at Constantinople on the occasion of the translation of the relics of St. Anastasius, who was martyred in 628, was shown by the beating of xyla. In the Life of St. Theodosius the Archimandrite, written by John Moschus during the 610s, one reads of some Eutychian monks of the party of Severus who, to disturb Theodosius (c. 423–529) at his devotion, "beat the wood" at an unwonted hour. St. Sabas (439–532) rose for his devotions "before the hour of striking."

Larger and smaller semantra have been used, the smaller being sounded first, followed by the larger, then by those of iron. Theodore Balsamon (12th century), in a treatise on the subject, compares the sounding of the little, great and iron semantra to the preaching of the Law and of the Gospel, and the Last Trumpet. He also says that the congregations were summoned by three semantra in monasteries, and only by one large one in parish churches. Moreover, he emphasises the persistence of the semantron in the East as a symbolic manifestation of difference with the Latin West (it remains unclear if some isolated practices in the West such as the Basque txalaparta are associated with the pre-schism liturgy); in Byzantium, the use of bells did not really gather momentum until after the Fourth Crusade (1202–1204), and at the 1453 Fall of Constantinople semantra still outnumbered bells by a five-to-one ratio.

Semantra, from their size and shape, furnished formidable weapons, and were sometimes so used with fatal effect in a church brawl.

=== Ottoman Empire ===
One reason why semantra continue to be used in southeastern Europe in particular is that the ringing of bells was outlawed during Ottoman times under Islamic rule, forcing monasteries to use the semantron instead; the practice then became customary.

=== Modern-period use by country ===
==== Bulgaria ====
In Bulgaria it largely fell into disuse after independence.

==== Russia ====
In Russia, the techniques for playing the bilo were retained in bell-ringing rubrics, and it could still be heard in more remote, rural areas at the time of the Revolution. Today, its use is restricted to the Altai region and Siberia, as well as Old Believer sketes, the latter retaining the aloofness toward outsiders that has characterised the group since it broke away from the main body of the Russian Orthodox Church (see Raskol). Also, a semantron may be in use because the monastery cannot afford a bell.

==== Syriac Orthodox ====
The Syrian Orthodox hold the semantron in great veneration, based on an ancient tradition that Noah invented it. According to the story, God told him: "Make for yourself a bell of box-wood, which is not liable to corruption, three cubits long and one and a half wide, and also a mallet from the same wood. Strike this instrument three separate times every day: once in the morning to summon the hands to the ark, once at midday to call them to dinner, and once in the evening to invite them to rest". The Syriacs strike their semantra when the liturgy is about to begin and when it is time to summon the people to public prayer. Their tradition also links the sound of the wood to the wood of the Garden of Eden that caused Adam to fall when he plucked its fruit, and to the nailing to the wood of the cross of Jesus Christ, come to atone for Adam's transgression.

=== Modern composers ===
Modern classical composers who have written for the instrument include Iannis Xenakis, James Wood and Michael Gordon.

== Bibliography ==
- Smith, William, and Cheetham, Samuel. A Dictionary of Christian Antiquities, p. 1879. Hartford, Connecticut: J. B. Burr, 1880.
