= History of Catalonia =

The recorded history of the lands of what today is known as Catalonia begins with the development of the Iberian peoples while several Greek colonies were established on the coast before the Roman conquest. It was the first area of Hispania conquered by the Romans. It then came under Visigothic rule after the collapse of the western part of the Roman Empire. In 718, the area was occupied by the Umayyad Caliphate and became a part of Muslim-ruled al-Andalus. The Frankish Empire conquered the northern half of the area from the Muslims, ending with the conquest of Barcelona in 801, as part of the creation of a larger buffer zone of Christian counties against Islamic rule historiographically known as the Marca Hispanica. In the 10th century, the County of Barcelona became progressively independent from Frankish rule.

In 1137, Ramon Berenguer IV, Count of Barcelona betrothed the heiress of the Kingdom of Aragon, Petronilla, establishing the dynastic union of the County of Barcelona with Aragon, resulting in a composite monarchy later known as Crown of Aragon, while the County of Barcelona and the other Catalan counties merged into a state, the Principality of Catalonia, which developed an institutional system (Catalan Courts, constitutions, Generalitat) that limited the power of the kings. Catalonia sponsored and contributed to the expansion of the Crown's trade and military, most significantly their navy. The Catalan language flourished and expanded as more territories were added to the Crown of Aragon, including Valencia, the Balearic Islands, Sardinia, Sicily, Naples, and Athens. The Crisis of the Late Middle Ages, the end of the reign of House of Barcelona, serf and urban conflicts and a civil war (1462–1472) weakened the role of the Principality within the Crown and internationally.

In 1516, Charles V became monarch of both the crowns of Aragon and Castile, creating a personal union in which every state kept their own laws, jurisdiction, institutions, borders and currency. In 1492 the Spanish colonization of the Americas began, political power began to shift away towards Castile. Tensions between Catalan institutions and the Monarchy, alongside the economic crisis and the peasants' revolts, caused the Reapers' War (1640–1652), in which a Catalan Republic was briefly established. By the Treaty of the Pyrenees (1659), the northern parts of Catalonia, mostly the Roussillon, were ceded to France. The status of separate state of the Principality of Catalonia came to an end after the War of Spanish Succession (1701–1714), in which the Crown of Aragon supported the claim of the Archduke Charles of Habsburg. Following Catalan capitulation on 11 September 1714, the king Philip V of Bourbon, inspired by the model of France imposed a unifying administration across Spain, enacting the Nueva Planta decrees, which suppressed Catalan political institutions and public law, and merged it into Castile as a province. These led to the eclipse of Catalan as a language of government and literature. During the second half of the 17th and the 18th centuries Catalonia experienced economic growth, reinforced in the late 18th century when Cádiz's trade monopoly with American colonies ended.

In the 19th century Catalonia was severely affected by the Napoleonic and Carlist Wars. The Napoleonic occupation and subsequent war in Spain began a period of political and economic turmoil. In the second third of the century, Catalonia became a center of industrialization. As wealth from the industrial expansion grew, Catalonia saw a cultural renaissance coupled with incipient nationalism while several workers movements (particularly anarchism) appeared.

In the 20th century, Catalonia enjoyed and lost varying degrees of autonomy. The Second Spanish Republic (1931–1939) established Catalan self-government and the official use of the Catalan language. Like much of Spain, Catalonia (which, in turn, expererienced a revolutionary process) fought to defend the Republic in the Civil War of 1936–1939. The Republican defeat established the dictatorship of Francisco Franco, which unleashed a harsh repression and suppressed the autonomy. With Spain devastated and cut off from international trade and the autarkic politics of the regime, Catalonia, as an industrial center, suffered severely; the economic recovery was slow. Between 1959 and 1974 Spain experienced the second-fastest economic expansion in the world known as the Spanish Miracle, and Catalonia prospered as Spain's most important industrial and tourist area. In 1975 Franco died, bringing his regime to an end, and the new democratic Spanish constitution of 1978 recognised Catalonia's autonomy and language. It regained considerable self-government in internal affairs and today remains one of the most economically dynamic communities of Spain. Since the 2010s there have been growing calls for Catalan independence.

== Prehistory ==
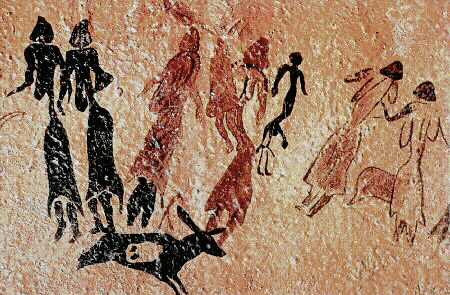
The caves of El Cogul contain paintings protected as part of a UNESCO World Heritage Site

The first known human settlements in what is now Catalonia were at the beginning of the Middle Palaeolithic. The oldest known trace of human occupation is a mandible found in Banyoles, described by some sources as pre-Neanderthal some 200,000 years old; other sources suggest it to be only about one third that old. Some of the most important prehistoric remains were found in the caves of Mollet (Serinyà, Pla de l'Estany), the Cau del Duc in the Montgrí mountain ("cau" meaning "cave" or "lair"), the remains at Forn d'en Sugranyes (Reus) and the shelters Romaní and Agut (Capellades), while those of the Upper Paleolithic are found at Reclau Viver, the cave of Arbreda and la Bora Gran d'en Carreres, in Serinyà, or the Cau de les Goges, in Sant Julià de Ramis. From the next prehistoric era, the Epipaleolithic or Mesolithic, important remains survive, the greater part dated between 8000 BC and 5000 BC, such as those of Sant Gregori (Falset) and el Filador (Margalef de Montsant).

The Neolithic era began in Catalonia around 4500 BC, although the population was slower to develop fixed settlements than in other places, thanks to the abundance of woods, which allowed the continuation of a fundamentally hunter-gatherer culture. The most important Neolithic remains in Catalonia are the Cave of Fontmajor (l'Espluga de Francolí), The Cave of Toll (Morà), the caves Gran and Freda (Montserrat), the shelters of Cogul and Ulldecona, or La Draga, an early Neolithic village which dates from the end of the 6th millennium BC.

The Chalcolithic or Eneolithic period developed in Catalonia between 2500 and 1800 BC, with the beginning of the construction of copper objects. The Bronze Age occurred between 1800 and 700 BC. There are few remnants of this era, but there were some known settlements in the low Segre zone. The Bronze Age coincided with the arrival of the Indo-Europeans through the Urnfield Culture, whose successive waves of migration began around 1200 BC, and they were responsible for the creation of the first proto-urban settlements. Around the middle of the 7th century BC, the Iron Age arrived in Catalonia.

== Ancient history ==
=== Rise of the Iberian culture ===
Ethnology of Iberia before the Roman conquest, c. 300 BC

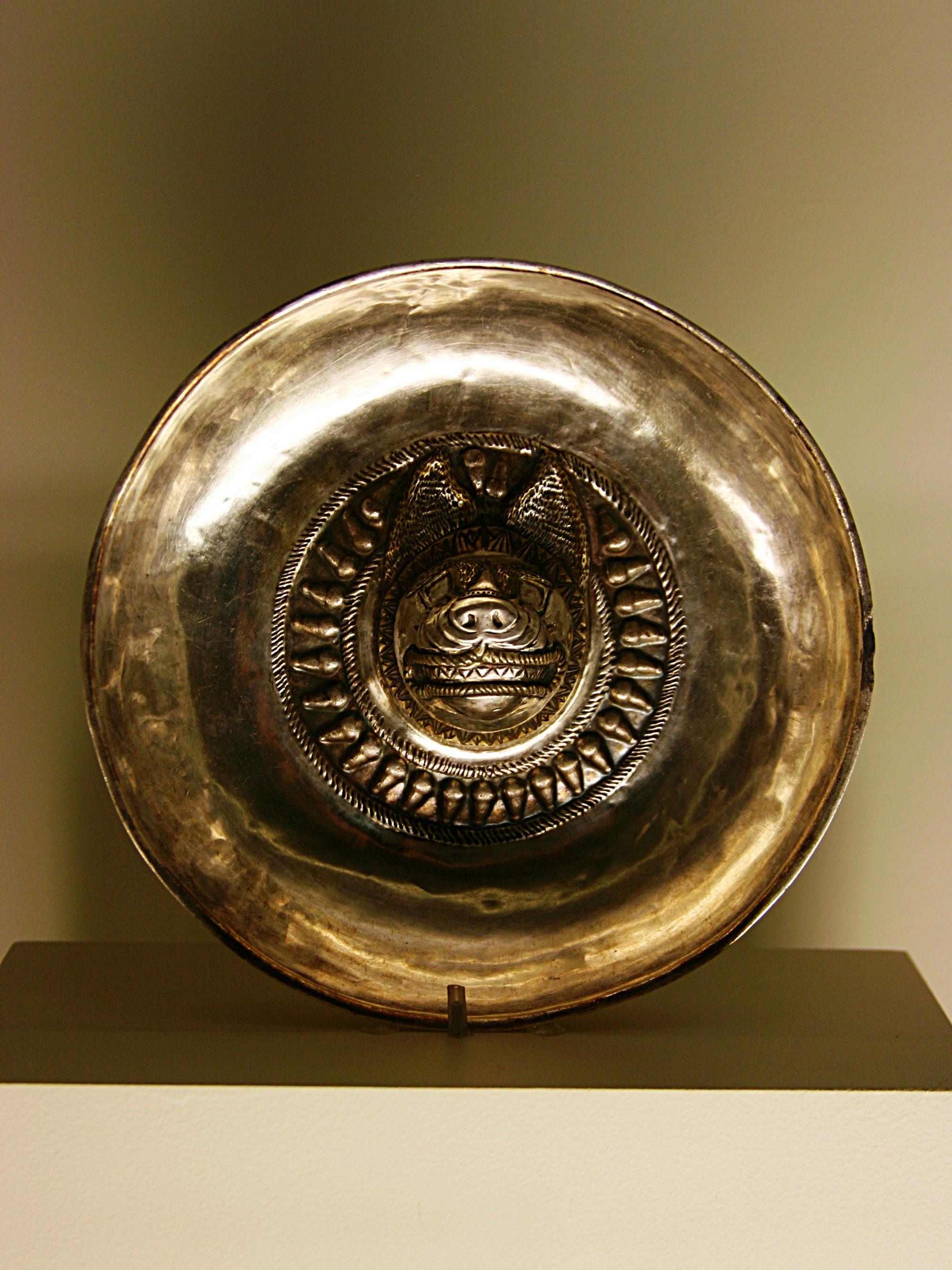
Ancient silver vessel from the Tivissa Treasure, c. 500 BC. Archaeology Museum of Catalonia

An iron-using culture first appeared in eastern Iberia in the 8th century BC. By the 5th century BC, the Iron Age Iberian civilization had become consolidated on the eastern side of the Iberian Peninsula. What is now the Catalan territory was home to several distinct tribes of Iberians: the Indigetes in Empordà, the Ceretani in Cerdanya and the Airenosins in the Val d'Aran. Some urban agglomerations became relevant, including Ilerda (Lleida) inland, Hibera (perhaps Amposta or Tortosa) or Indika (Ullastret). The settlement of Castellet de Banyoles in Tivissa was one of the most important ancient Iberian settlements. This, situated in the northeast of the peninsula, was discovered in 1912. Also, the 'Treasure of Tivissa', a unique collection of silver Iberian votive offerings was found here in 1927.

Iberian society was divided into different classes, including kings or chieftains, nobles, priests, artisans and slaves. Iberian aristocracy, often called a "senate" by the ancient sources, met in a council of nobles. Kings or chieftains would maintain their forces through a system of obligation or vassalage that the Romans termed "fides".

The Iberians adopted wine and olives from the Greeks; Horse breeding was of particular importance to the Iberian nobility. Mining was a major contributor to the economy, from which fine metalwork and high-quality iron weapons could be produced.

The Iberian language was a Paleohispanic language. The oldest inscriptions are dated from the end of the 5th century BC, and the most recent of the end of the first century BC, even at the beginning of the 1st century AD, after being gradually replaced by Latin. In its different variants, the Iberian language was spoken in a broad coastal strip stretching from southern Languedoc to Alicante.

Greeks arrived to the Iberian coasts by the late 7th century BC. The trading colony of Empúries (in Greek Emporion, meaning "market", in Latin Emporiae), was founded on the northern coast of current Catalonia by the Greek city of Phocaea in the 6th century BC. Situated on the coastal commercial route between Massalia (Marseille) and Tartessos in the far south of Hispania, the city became a center of economic and commercial activity. Another known Greek colony was Rhode (Roses), located on the coast at the northern end of the Gulf of Roses.

=== Roman times (200 B.C–400 A.D) ===
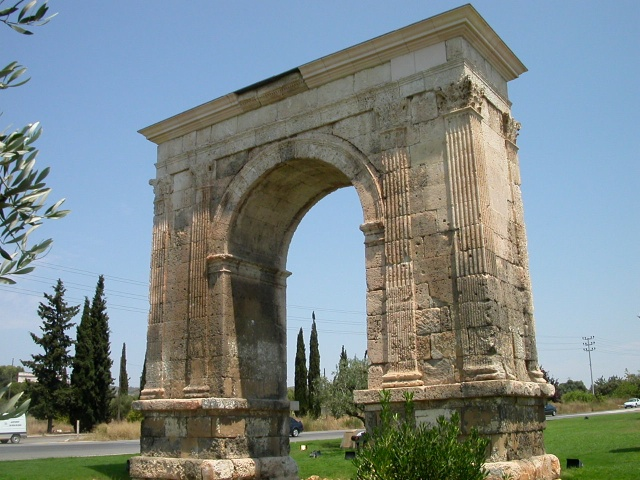
Arc de Berà (Roda de Berà, Tarragona)

Romanization brought a second, distinct stage in the ancient history of Catalonia. Gnaeus Cornelius Scipio Calvus arrived in Empúries in 218 BC, with the objective of cutting off the sources of provisions of Hannibal's Carthaginian army during the Second Punic War. After the Carthaginian defeat, and the defeat of various Iberian tribes who rose up against Roman rule, 195 BC saw the effective completion of the Roman conquest of the territory that later became Catalonia. Romanization of the region began in earnest. The various tribes were absorbed into a common Roman culture and lost many distinct characteristics, including differences of language. Most local leaders were later admitted into the Roman aristocratic class.

Most of what is now Catalonia first became part of the Roman province of Hispania Citerior; after 27 BC, they became part of Tarraconensis, whose capital was Tarraco (now Tarragona). Other important cities of the Roman period are Ilerda (Lleida), Dertosa (Tortosa), Gerunda (Girona) as well as the ports of Empuriæ (former Emporion) and Barcino (Barcelona). As for the rest of Hispania, Latin law was granted to all cities under the reign of Vespasian (69-79 AD), while Roman citizenship was permitted to all free men of the Empire by the Edict of Caracalla in 212 AD (Tarraco, the capital, was already a colony of Roman law since 45 BC). It was a rich agricultural province (olive oil, vine, wheat), and the first centuries of the Empire saw the construction of roads (the most important being the Via Augusta, parallel to Mediterranean coastline) and infrastructure like aqueducts.

The Crisis of the Third Century affected the whole Roman Empire, and gravely affected the Catalan territory, where there is evidence of significant levels of destruction and abandonment of Roman villas. This period also provides the first documentary evidence of the arrival of Christianity. Conversion to Christianity, attested in the 3rd century, was completed in urban areas in the 4th century. The first Christian communities in the Tarraconense were founded during the 3rd century, and the diocese of Tarraco was already established by 259, when the bishop Saint Fructuosus (Fructuós) and the deacons Augurius and Eulogius were burned alive on the orders of the governor Aemilianus, under an edict issued by the emperor Valerian. Although Hispania remained under Roman rule and did not fall under the rule of Vandals, Swabians and Alans in the 5th century, the main cities suffered frequent sacking and some deurbanization. While archaeological evidence shows the recovery of some urban nuclei, such as Barcino (later Barcelona), Tarraco (later Tarragona), and Gerunda (later Girona), the previous situation was not restored: the cities became smaller, and constructed defensive walls.

== From late antiquity to feudalism (400–1100) ==
=== Visigothic and Muslim rule ===
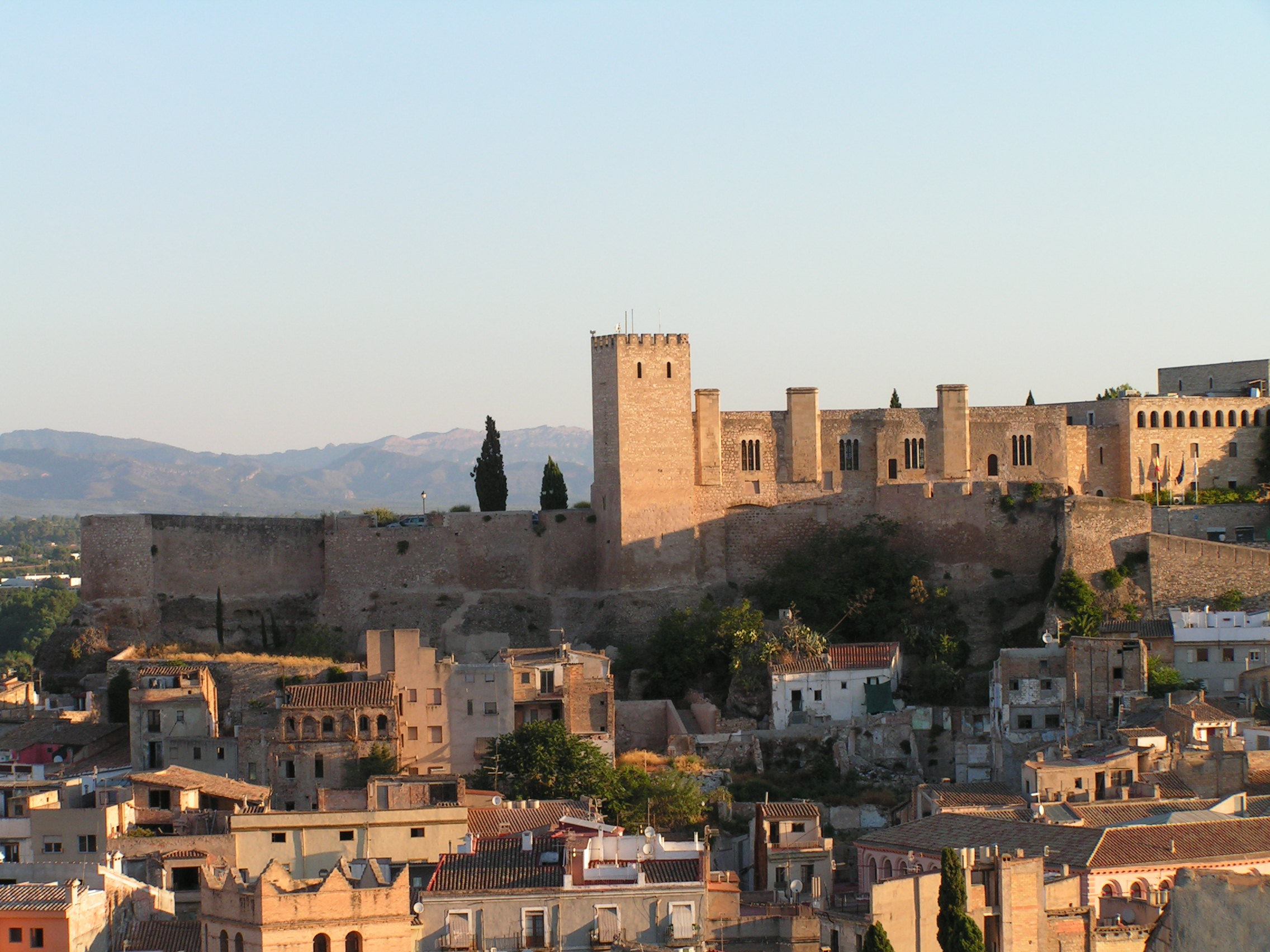
Military fortress (suda) of Tortosa

In the 5th century, as part of the invasion of the Roman Empire by Germanic tribes, the Visigoths led by Athaulf, installed themselves in the Tarraconensis (Ebro basin, 410) and when in 475 the Visigothic king Euric formed the kingdom of Tolosa (modern Toulouse), he incorporated the territory equivalent to present-day Catalonia. Later, the Visigothic kingdom lost most of its territory north of the Pyrenees and shifted its capital to Toledo. The Visigothic Kingdom in Hispania lasted until the early 8th century. The Visigothic Kingdom respected and adopted the provincial system inherited from the Romans, the Tarraconense was maintained, but after the establishment of the new province of Cantabria its extension was reduced to the Valley of the Ebro and the current Catalonia. Beginning in 654, king Recceswinth ordered the promulgation of the Liber Iudiciorum ("Book of the Judges"), which was the first law code that applied equally to the Goths and to the Hispano-Roman population. This compilation will be in vigor in Catalan counties until the compilation of the Usages of Barcelona by count Ramon Berenguer I, largely based on the same Liber Iudiciorum. Between 672 and 673, the eastern part of the Tarraconenis (modern Catalonia) and the province of Septimania rebelled against king Wamba, appointing dux Flavius Paulus as king in Narbonne. The rebellion was crushed by Wamba.

In 714, the Umayyad forces reached the northeastern part of the peninsula, where some important clashes took place (Zaragoza, possibly Barcelona). In 720, Narbonne fell to the joint Arab-Berber forces, followed by the conquest of what remained of the Visigothic kingdom, Septimania. The last Visigothic king Ardo died in battle in 721 and Nîmes was captured four years later.

In the time of the Caliphate of Córdoba in the 10th century, the northern border stabilized against the Frankish-ruled counties along the Llobregat and Cardener rivers and the Montsec Range. Lleida and Tortosa, the two main cities of the Muslim ruled area of today's Catalonia (historiographically known as "New Catalonia"), formed the centers of defense. Many of the predominantly Christian inhabitants of these Muslim border regions converted to Islam. Especially the inhabitants of the valleys of Ebro, Segre, and Cinca as well as the plain of Lleida took over the way of life and achievements of the Muslims like the highly developed irrigation techniques. The most important Muslim cities in Catalonia were Lleida, Balaguer and Tortosa. They developed an old town (Medina) in North African style with mosque, administrative headquarters and court. They also had large markets (Suq) with workshops and homes of artisans. In some cities there were open places of worship (Musallā) and – as in Tortosa – including a military fortress. Goods were exported via the port of Tortosa. Although there were peace treaties between the caliph in Córdoba and some Catalan counts, the mutual attacks accumulated so, in 985 Almanzor, de facto ruler of the Caliphate, sacked Barcelona and captured thousands of its inhabitants.

=== Carolingian conquest ===
Evolution of the Catalan counties between the 8th and the 12th centuries

After repelling Muslim incursions as far north as Tours in 732, the expanding Frankish Empire set about creating a buffer zone of Christian counties in the south that became historiographically known as the Marca Hispanica or Gothia. The first county to be conquered from the Moors was in Septimania which became Roussillon (including the Vallespir), following the conquest of Narbonne (759).

In 785 the County of Girona (with Besalú) on the south side of the Pyrenees was captured. Ribagorça and Pallars were linked to Toulouse and were added to this county around 790. Urgell and Cerdanya were added in 798. The first records of the county of Empúries (with Perelada) are from 812, but the county was probably under Frankish control before 800. After a series of struggles, Charlemagne's son Louis took Barcelona from the Moorish emir in 801 and set up the County of Barcelona.

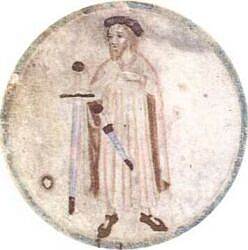
Wilfred the Hairy, depicted in the Genealogy of the Kings of Aragon, c. 1400

The counts of the Marca Hispanica had small outlying territories, each ruled by a lesser miles with armed retainers, who owed allegiance through the Count to the Carolingian Emperor and later to the kings of West Francia.

At the end of the 9th century, the Carolingian monarch Charles the Bald designated Wilfred the Hairy – a noble descendant of a family from Conflent and son of the earlier Count of Barcelona Sunifred I – as Count of Cerdanya and Urgell (870). After Charles's death (877), Wilfred became the Count of Barcelona and Girona (878) as well, bringing together the greater part of what was later to become Catalonia. On his death the counties were divided again among his sons, however, since then, the counties of Barcelona, Girona and Ausona (he repopulated the last one after a revolt) remained under the rule of the same person, becoming the core of the future Principality. Upon his death in 897 Wilfred, making their titles hereditaries founded the dynasty of the House of Barcelona, which ruled Catalonia until the death of Martin I, its last ruling member, in 1410.

=== The rise and fall of the aloers ===
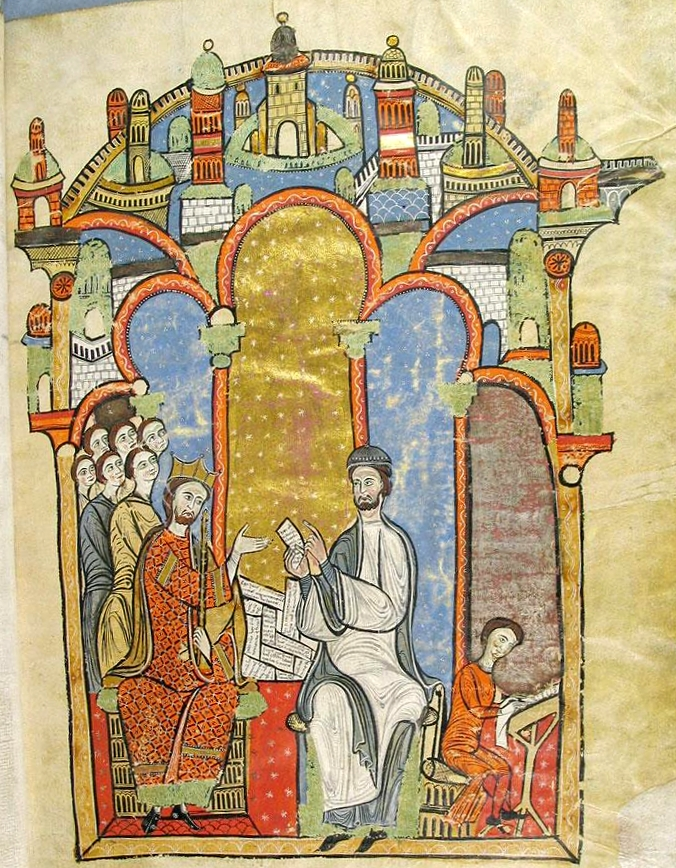
Liber feudorum maior, compilation of documents related to the domains of the Counts of Barcelona and its vassals. Frontispiece

During the 10th century, the counts became increasingly independent of the weakening Carolingians. This was publicly acknowledged in 988 when the Count of Barcelona Borrell II declined to swear fealty to Hugh Capet, the first Capetian monarch of the emerging French kingdom. Borrell was motivated by Capet's failure to address Borrell's petitions to Capet for assistance against Muslim incursions. During this period, the population of the Catalan counties began to increase for the first time since the Muslim invasion. During the 9th and 10th centuries, the counties increasingly became a society of aloers, peasant proprietors of small, family-based farms, who lived by subsistence agriculture and owed no formal feudal allegiance.

The 11th century was characterized by the development of feudal society, as the miles formed links of vassalage over this previously independent peasantry. The middle years of the century were characterized by virulent class warfare. Seigniorial violence was unleashed against the peasants, utilizing new military tactics, based on contracting well-armed mercenary soldiers mounted on horses. By the end of the century, most of the aloers had been converted into vassals.

This coincided with a weakening of the power of the counts and the division of the Spanish Marches into more numerous counties, which gradually became a feudal state based on complex fealties and dependencies. During the regency of countess Ermesinde of Carcassonne the disintegration of central power was evident. From the time of the triumph of the grandson of Ermessinde, Ramon Berenguer I overlords and surrounding counts, the counts of Barcelona stood firmly as the link in a web of fealty between the counts and the Crown. Ramon Berenguer I began the codification of Catalan law in the written Usages of Barcelona which was to become the first full compilation of feudal law in Western Europe. Legal codification was part of the count's efforts to forward and somehow control the process of feudalization. The response of the Catholic Church to the feudal violence was the movement of Peace and Truce of God. The first assembly of Peace and Truce was presided by Abbot Oliba in Toulouges, Roussillon in 1027. The Peace and Truce assemblies promoted the establishment of sagreres, the space surrounding the churches considered sacred territory, protected from feudal violence, under penalty of excommunication.

=== First references to the name Catalonia ===
The term "Catalonia" is first documented in an early 12th-century Latin chronicle called the Liber maiolichinus, where Ramon Berenguer III, Count of Barcelona is referred to as catalanicus heroes, rector catalanicus, and dux catalanensis.

Some manuscripts suggest that Catalunya (Latin Gathia Launia) Gothia (or Gauthia), "Land of the Goths", since the origins of the Catalan counts, lords and people were found in the ancient March of Gothia, known as Gothia, whence Gothland > Gothlandia > Gothalania from which Catalonia has been theoretically derived. During the Middle Ages, Byzantine chroniclers claimed that Catalania derives from the local medley of Goths with Alans, initially constituting a Goth-Alania. Alternatively, the name may come from the word "ca(s)telan" (inhabitant of the castle) as the area had many fortifications.

== Catalonia and Aragon (1100–1479) ==
=== Dynastic union with Aragon ===
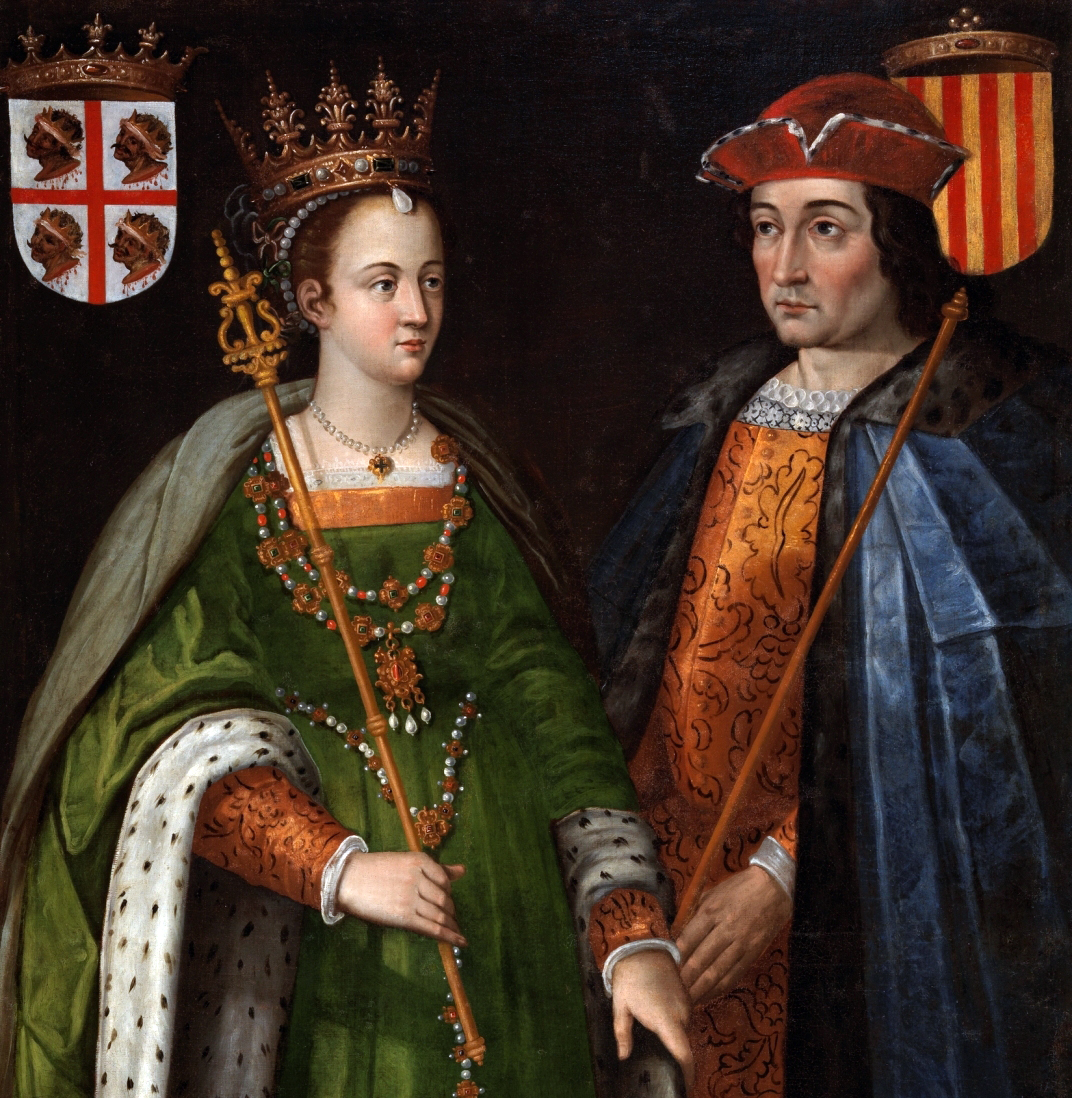
Petronilla of Aragon and Ramon Berenguer IV, Count of Barcelona, dynastic union of the Crown of Aragon

Until the middle of the 12th century, the successive counts of Barcelona tried to expand their domain in multiple directions. Ramon Berenguer III incorporated the County of Besalú, part of the County of Empúries, all of the County of Cerdanya, and also the County of Provence through his marriage to Douce of Provence. The Catalan church, for its part, became independent of the bishopric of Narbonne by restoring the archiepiscopal see of Tarragona (1118).

In 1137 the dynastic union that would later be known as Crown of Aragon was established after Ramon Berenguer IV, Count of Barcelona betrothed the heiress of the Kingdom of Aragon, Petronilla, after Ramiro II of Aragon agreed to donate his kingdom and his daughter Petronilla to Barcelona's Count, avoiding and protecting Aragon from a potential invasion and annexion by Castile. Ramon Berenguer IV used the title "comes Barchinonensis" (count of the Barcelonians) as his primary title and "princeps Aragonensis" (prince of the Aragonians) as his second title, beside his wife who retained her title of Regina ("queen"). Their son and heir, Alfonso II of Aragon and I of Barcelona consolidated the dynastic union as Rex Aragonum, Comes Barchinone et Marchio Provincie ("king of Aragon, count of Barcelona, and marquis of Provence"). Catalonia and Aragon retained their distinct traditional rights, and Catalonia its own personality with one of the first parliaments in Europe, the General Court of Catalonia (Catalan: Cort General de Catalunya).

In addition, the reign of Ramon Berenguer IV saw the Catalan conquest of Lleida and Tortosa, completing the unification of all of the territory that comprises modern Catalonia. This included a territory to the south of the Catalan counties, which became known as Catalunya Nova ("New Catalonia") and which was repopulated with Catalans by the end of the 12th century.

=== Expansion and institutionalization of the Principality ===
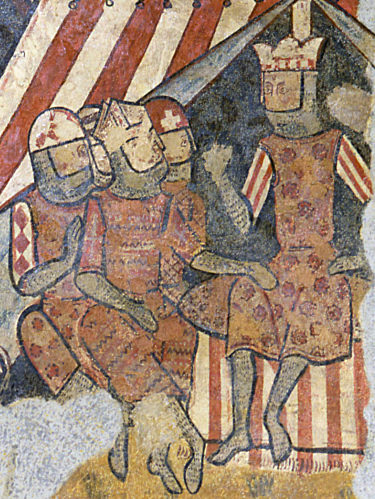
James I of Aragon with the bishop of Barcelona Berenguer de Palou, Bernat de Centelles and Gilabert de Cruïlles during the conquest of Majorca (1229)

During the reign of Alfonso, in 1173, Catalonia was regarded as a legal entity for the first time, while the Usages of Barcelona were compiled in the process to turn them into the law of Catalonia (Consuetudinem Cathalonie). Apart from the Usages, between 1170 and 1195 the Liber feudorum maior and the Gesta Comitum Barchinonensium were also compiled and written, being considered together as the "three milestones of Catalan political identity".

Catalonia became the base for the Aragonese Crown's sea power, which came to dominate a maritime empire that extended across the western Mediterranean after the conquest of Valencia, the Balearic Islands, Sardinia, and the accession in Sicily of the kings of Aragon. This period saw a large increase of maritime trade in Catalan ports, particularly of the Aragonese Crown's leading city, Barcelona.

At the end of the 12th century, a series of pacts between the crowns of Aragon and Castile delimited the zones that the two would each attempt to conquer from Muslim-ruled kingdoms, (the "Reconquista"); to the east, in 1213, the defeat and death of Peter II of Aragon ("Peter the Catholic") in the Battle of Muret put an end to the project of consolidating the Aragonese influence and power over Provence and the County of Toulouse. His successor James I of Aragon did not fully consolidate his power until 1227; once he consolidated his inherited realm, he began a series of new conquests. Over the course of the next quarter-century he conquered Majorca and Valencia. The latter became a new state, the third kingdom associated with the Crown of Aragon, with its own court and a new fuero (code of laws): the Furs de València. In contrast, the Majorcan territory together with that of the counties of Cerdanya, Vallespir, Capcir and Roussillon and the city of Montpellier were left as a kingdom for his son James II of Majorca as the Kingdom of Majorca. This division began a period of struggle that ended with the annexation of that kingdom by the Crown of Aragon in 1344 by Peter IV "the Ceremonious".

In 1258, James I and Louis IX of France signed the Treaty of Corbeil: the French king, as the heir of Charlemagne, renounced his claims of feudal overlordship over Catalonia, which it was effectively independent from French rule since the end of the 10th century, while James renounced his claims in Occitania.

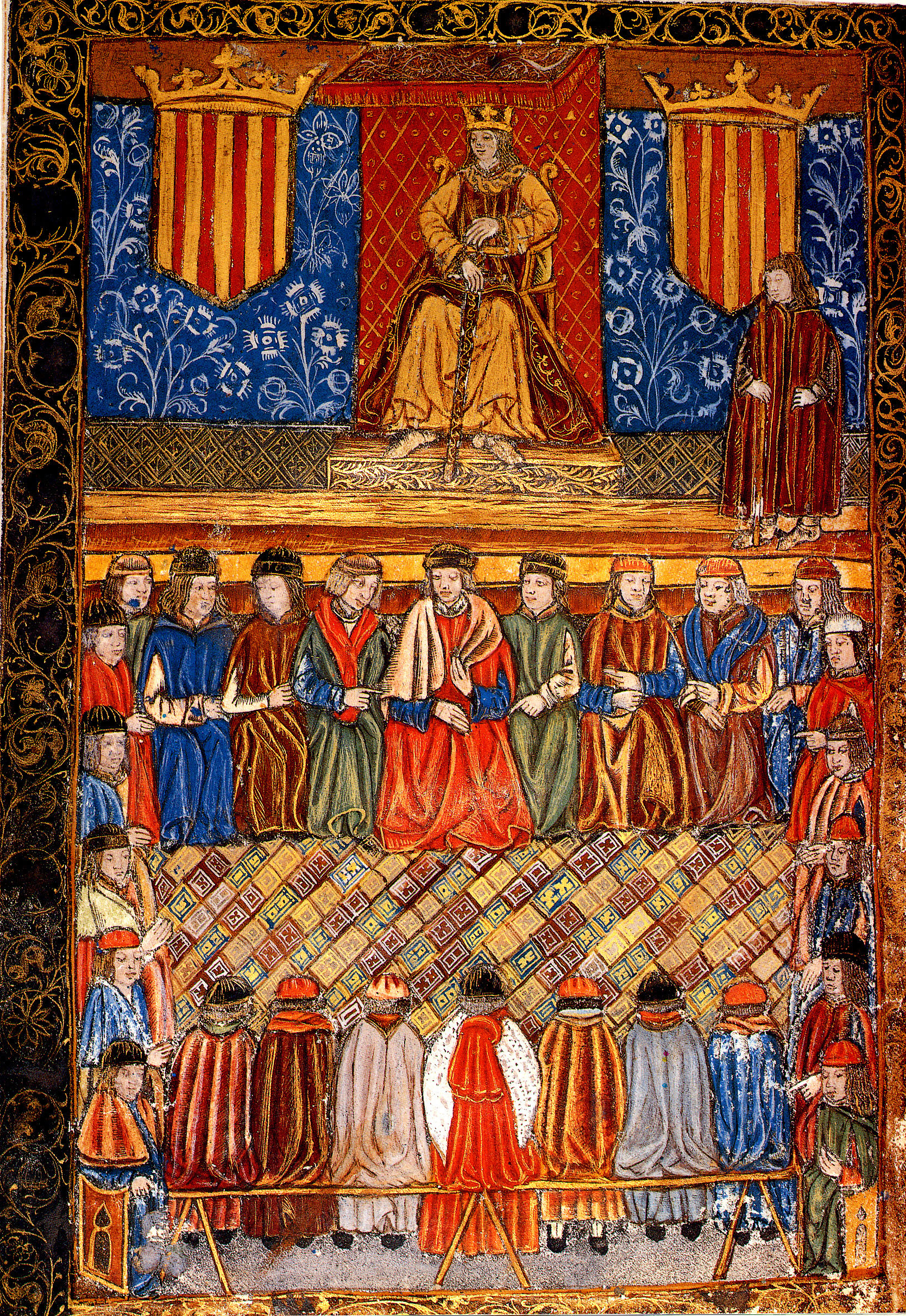
Miniature (15th century) of the General Court of Catalonia, presided over by Ferdinand II

At the same time, the Principality of Catalonia developed a complex institutional and political system based on the concept of a pact between the estates of the realm and the king. From 1283 onwards, legislation had to be approved in the General Court of Catalonia (or Catalan Courts), regarded the first parliamentary body of Europe that banned the royal power to create legislation unilaterally. The Courts were composed of the three estates, were presided over by the monarch as count of Barcelona, and passed the Constitutions of Catalonia, which created a compilation of rights for the inhabitants of the Principality. In order to collect general taxes, the Courts of 1359 established a permanent representation of deputies, the Deputation of the General (Catalan: Diputació del General) and later usually known as Generalitat, which gained an important political power over the next centuries.

Diachronic map of the Crown of Aragon. The Principality of Catalonia appears in light green

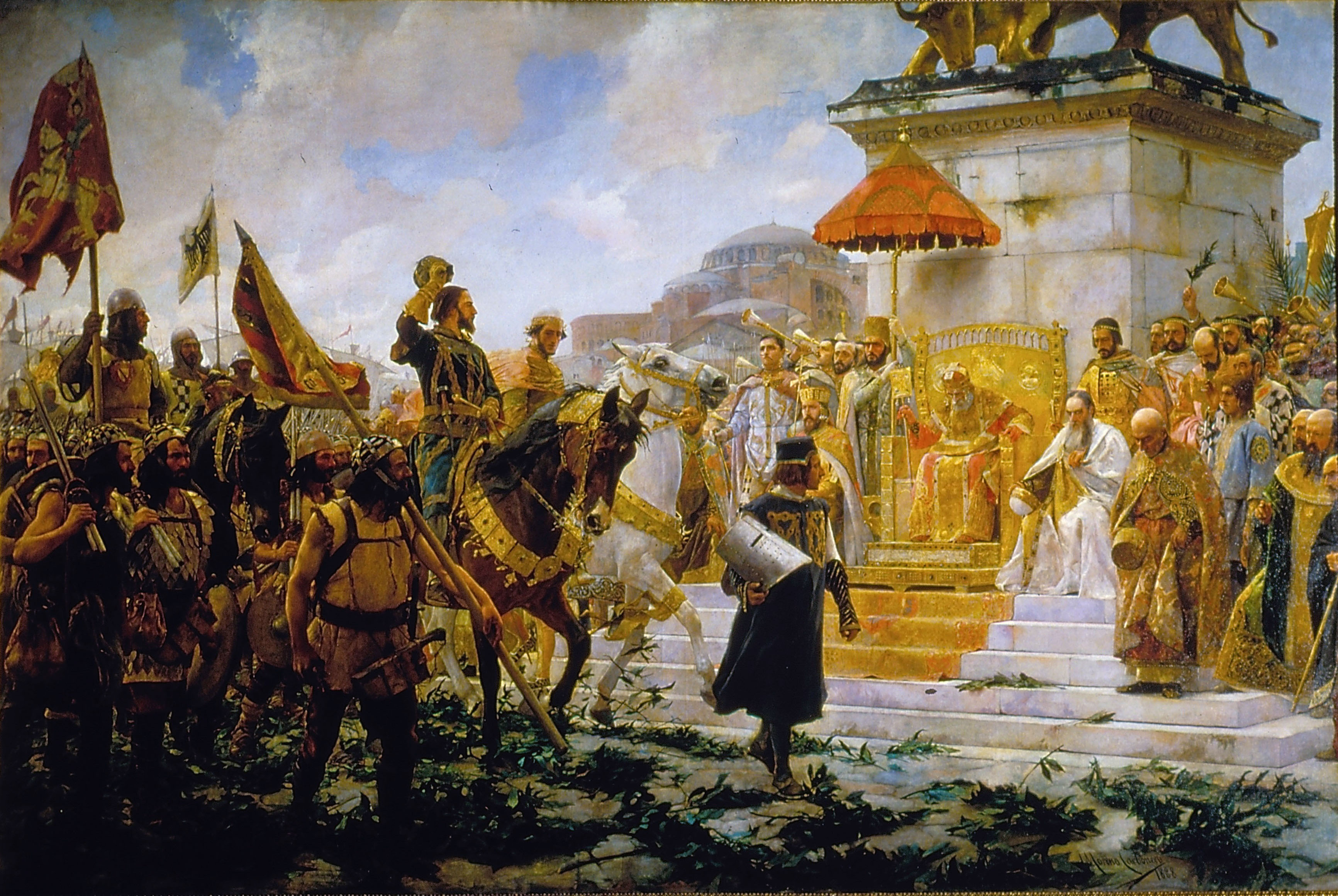
Roger de Flor and the Catalan Company in Constantinople

The Principality of Catalonia saw a prosperous period during the 13th century and the first half of the 14th. The population increased; Catalan culture expanded into the islands of the Western Mediterranean. The reign of Peter III of Aragon ("the Great") included the conquest of Sicily and the successful defense against a French crusade; his son and successor Alfonso ("the Generous") conquered Menorca; and Peter's second son James II, who first acceded to the throne of Sicily and then succeeded his older brother as king of Aragon, conquered Sardinia; under James II, and Catalonia was the center of the flourishing empire. Barcelona, then the most frequent royal residence, was consolidated as the administrative center of the domains with the establishment of the Royal Archives in 1318. The Catalan Company, mercenaries led by Roger de Flor and formed by Almogavar veterans of the War of the Sicilian Vespers, were hired by the Byzantine Empire to fight the Turks, defeating them in several battles. After the assassination of Roger de Flor by orders of the emperor's son Michael Palaiologos (1305), the Company took revenge sacking Thrace and later Greece, where they took the duchies of Athens and Neopatras in the name of the King of Aragon. Catalan rule over the Greek lands lasted until 1390. The Crown became the protector of the united Albanian principalities after the Treaty of Gaeta.

This territorial expansion was accompanied by a great development of the Catalan trade, centered in Barcelona, creating an extensive trade network across the Mediterranean which competed with those of the maritime republics of Genoa and Venice. In this line, institutions were created that would give legal protection to merchants, such as the Consulate of the Sea and the Book of the Consulate of the Sea, one of the first compilations of maritime law. The trade allowed the formation of banking. In 1401, the local authorities created a pioneering public bank, the Taula de canvi de Barcelona, arguably the world's first-ever central bank.

The second quarter of the 14th century saw crucial changes for Catalonia, marked by a succession of natural catastrophes, demographic crises, stagnation and decline in the Catalan economy, and the rise of social tensions. In 1333, known as Lo mal any primer ("The first bad year"), a severe famine affected the lands of the Crown. Between 1347 and 1497 the Principality of Catalonia lost 37 percent of its population. (Note: John Huxtable Elliott (1984). The revolt of the Catalans: a study in the decline of Spain (1598–1640). Cambridge University Press. p. 26. ISBN 0-521-27890-2. "Between 1347 and 1497 the Principality [Catalonia] had lost 37% of its inhabitants, and was reduced to a population of something like 300,000.) The reign of Peter the Ceremonious was a time of war: the annexation of Majorca, the quelling of a rebellion in Sardinia, a rebellion by an Aragonese faction who wished to extinguish local Catalan privileges in favor of a more centralized kingdom of Aragon, and an Aragonese-Castilian war. These wars created a delicate financial situation, in a framework of demographic and economic crisis, to which was added a generation later a crisis of succession generated by the death in 1410 of Martin I without a descendant or a named successor. A two-year interregnum progressively evolved in favor of a candidate from the Castilian Trastámara dynasty, Ferdinand of Antequera, who on the Compromise of Caspe (1412), representatives of Aragon, Valencia and Catalonia appointed him monarch as Ferdinand I of Aragon. Opposition to Ferdinand, led by the alternate candidate James II, Count of Urgell, was defeated in 1413.

=== The 15th century ===
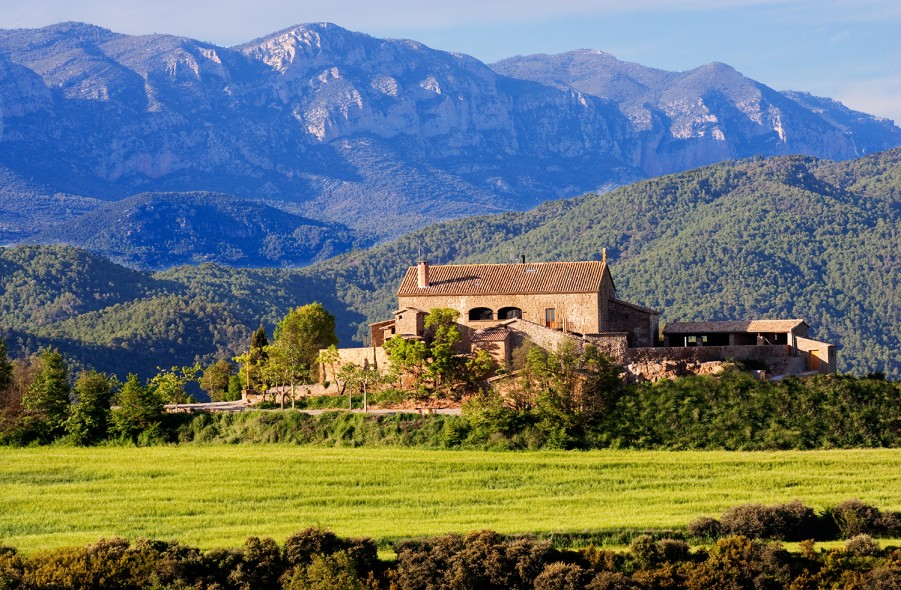
Masia of Heretat de Guàrdia (La Baronia de Rialb). After the Sentencia of Guadalupe, the masies ruled by emphyeutic system became one the basis of prosperity in Catalan countryside

Ferdinand's successor, Alfonso V ("the Magnanimous"), promoted a new stage of Aragonese expansion, this time over the Kingdom of Naples, over which he finally gained dominion in 1443. At the same time, though, he aggravated the social crisis in the Principality of Catalonia, both in the countryside and in the cities. Political conflict in Barcelona arose due to the disputes over the control of the Consell de Cent between two political factions, Biga and Busca looking for a solution to the economic crisis. Meanwhile, the "remença" (serfs') peasants subjected to the feudal abuses known as Evil customs began to organize themselves as a syndicate against seignorial pressures, searching protection from the monarch. Alfonso's brother, John II ("the Unreliable"), was an exceptionally deeply hated and opposed regent and ruler – both in the Basque kingdom of Navarre and in Catalonia.

The opposition of the institutions of Catalonia to the policies of John II resulted in their support to the son of John, Charles, Prince of Viana over his denied dynastic rights. In response of the detention of Charles by his father, the Generalitat established a political body, the Council of the Principality, with whom, under menace of a conflict, John was forced to negotiate. The Capitulation of Vilafranca (1461) forced to release Charles from prison and appoint him lieutenant of Catalonia, while the king would need permission of the Generalitat to enter the Principality. The content of the Capitulation represented a culmination and consolidation of pactism and the constitutional system of Catalonia. However, the disaggrament of King John, the death of Charles shortly after and the remença uprising in 1462 led to a ten-year Catalan civil war that left the country exhausted. In 1472, the last separate ruler of Catalonia, the king René of Anjou ("the Good"), lost the war against King John.

The remença conflict did not reach any definitive conclusion and in 1493 France returned the counties of Roussillon and Cerdagne, which it had occupied during the conflict. Ferdinand II of Aragon ("the Catholic") profoundly reformed Catalan institutions, recovered without war the northern Catalan counties, increased active involvement in Italy and finally resolved the major grievances of the remences with the Sentencia Arbitral de Guadalupe in 1486, in exchange for a payment. The Sentencia allowed the beginning of the right to freely contract emphyteutic agreements, which led to general prosperity in the Catalan countryside throughout the next centuries. In the frame of the institutional reforms of Ferdinand, in 1481 the Catalan Courts approved the Constitució de l'Observança, which established the submission of royal power to the laws of the Principality of Catalonia.

== Early modern period (1479–1808) ==
=== Crown of Aragon union with Crown of Castile ===
Ferdinand's 1469 marriage to Isabella I of Castile and his subsequent accession to the throne of Aragon in 1479 brought about a dynastic union of the Crown of Aragon with Castile. After the 1512 invasion of the Kingdom of Navarre, in 1516 the monarchies were formally united into a single Monarchy of Spain ("Kingdom of the Spains", as it was sometimes known). Each realm of the Monarchy conserved its political institutions and maintained its own courts, laws, public administration, and separate coinage of money.

Charles V's European territories. The Principality of Catalonia was included in the domains of the Crown of Aragon (in red)

When Christopher Columbus made his discovery in The Americas during a Spanish-sponsored expedition, and began to shift Europe's trade and economic centre of gravity (and the focus of Spain's ambitions) from the Mediterranean to the Atlantic Ocean, undermining Catalonia's economic and political importance. Aragonese and Catalan power in the Mediterranean would continue, but efforts to achieve further Spanish conquests in Europe itself largely stopped and the maritime expansion into the Atlantic and the conquest of territories in the Americas was not a Catalan enterprise. Castile and the realms of Aragon were separate states until 1716 in spite of a shared crown and the newly established colonies in the Americas and Pacific were Castilian, administered as appendages of Castile, until in 1778 Seville was the only port authorized to trade in America, and despite the dynastic union Catalans, as subjects of the Crown of Aragon, had no right to trade directly with the Castilian-ruled Americas.

By virtue of descent from his maternal grandparents, Ferdinand II of Aragon and Isabella I of Castile, in 1516 Charles I of Spain became the first king to rule the Crowns of Castile and Aragon simultaneously by his own right. Following the death of his paternal (House of Habsburg) grandfather, Maximilian I, Holy Roman Emperor, he was also elected Charles V, Holy Roman Emperor, in 1519. In the 16th century, the Catalan population began a demographic recovery and some measure of economic recovering. The reign of Charles V was a relative harmonious period, during which Catalonia generally accepted the new structure of Spain, despite its own marginalization. As the focus of Spanish maritime power and of European rivalry shifted to the Atlantic, the Kingdom of Valencia became the most important kingdom of the Aragonese Crown, eclipsing Barcelona. The reign of Philip II marked the beginning of a gradual process of stagnation of Catalan economy, language, and culture. Among the most negative elements of the period were a rise in piracy along the coasts and banditry in the interior.

=== The Reapers' War ===
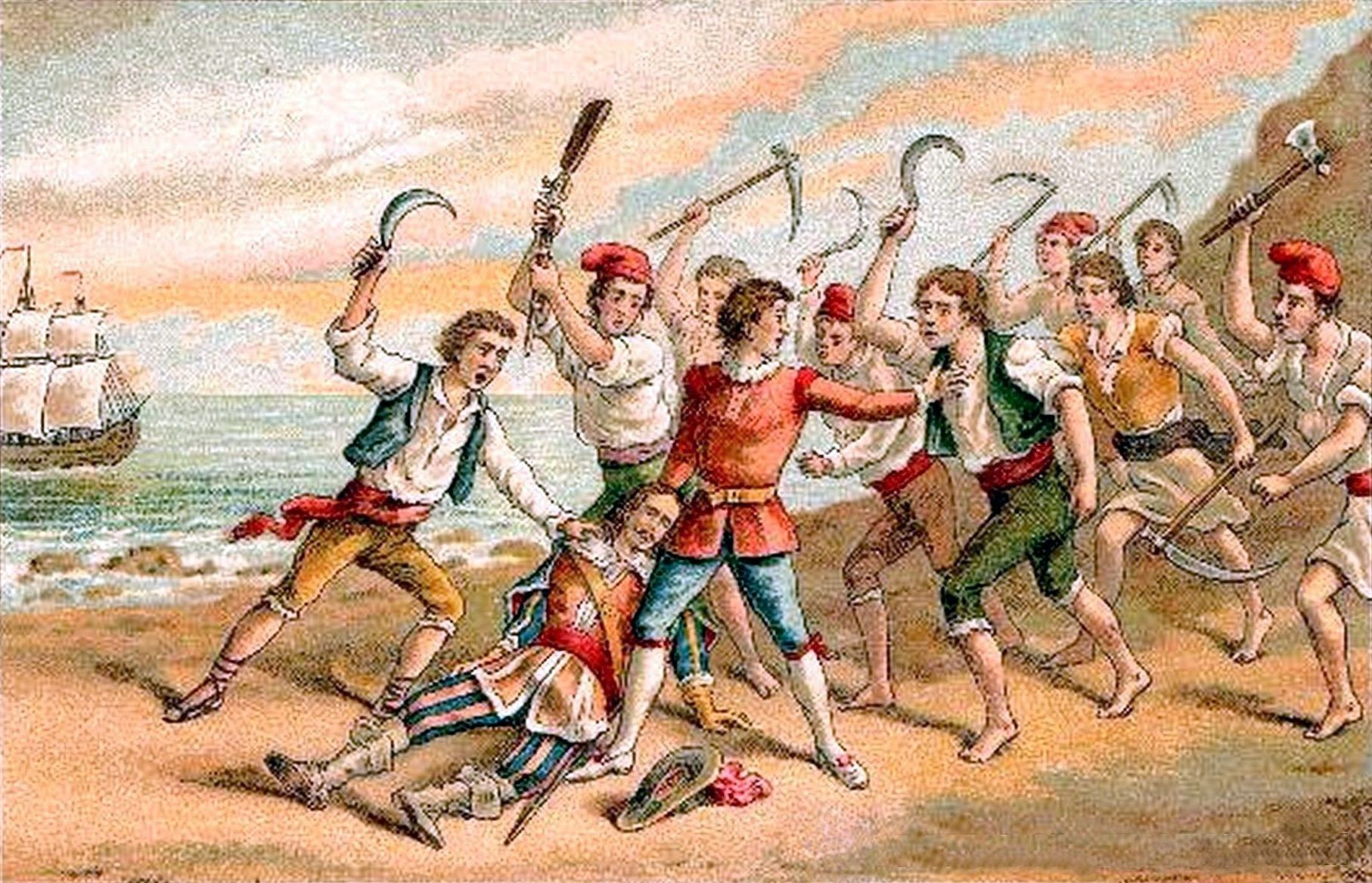
The Reapers' War "Corpus of Blood" (1640). Painted in 1910

Conflicts had already arisen between Catalonia and the monarchy in the time of Philip II. Having exhausted the economic resources of Castile, Philip wished to avail himself of those of the other polities of the Monarchy; Catalan institutions and laws were well protected by the terms and nature of the union of crowns, and were jealously guarded by the Catalan population, who during those times saw an increase of its participation in the local and general government of the Principality. After Philip IV acceded to the throne in 1621, his minister the Count-Duke of Olivares attempted to sustain an ambitious foreign policy by taxing the kingdoms of the Iberian Peninsula and establishing a military contribution to the Empire in each one of them (the Unión de Armas, "Union of Arms"), which meant laying aside the until-then-prevailing principles of the composite monarchy, in favor of an increased centralization. Resistance in Catalonia was especially strong, given the lack of any significant apparent regional return for the sacrifices. The Catalan Courts of 1626 and 1632 were never concluded, due to the opposition of the estates against the economical and military measures of Olivares, many of which violated the Catalan constitutions. The failure of the Courts aggravated the tensions between Catalan institutions and Monarchy, favoring a scenario of rupture.

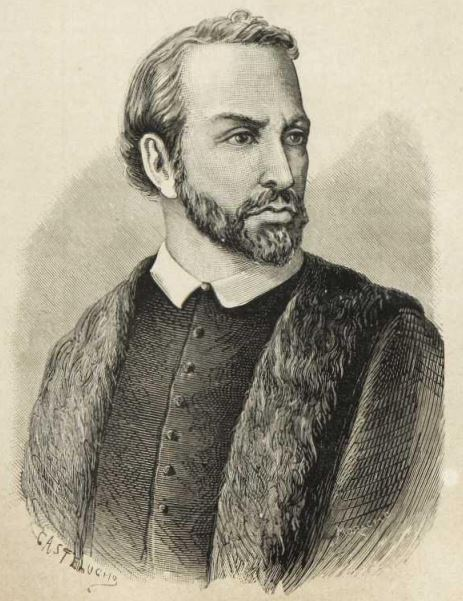
Pau Claris, President of the Generalitat during the Reaper's War

The Reapers' War (Catalan: Guerra dels Segadors, 1640–59) started as an uprising of peasants in northern areas of Catalonia. When Spanish tercios (military corps) concentrated in Roussillon at the end of the 1630s, because of the Thirty Years' War with France, local peasants were required to lodge and provision the troops, thus creating a large tension and discomfort among them, and events such as religious sacrileges, destruction of personal properties and rape of local women by the soldiers were reported. The protest of the peasantry in the north quickly extended to Barcelona; On 7 June 1640 an uprising in Barcelona known as the Corpus de Sang, led by reapers, took the lives of various royal functionaries, Dalmau de Queralt, Count of Santa Coloma and viceroy of Catalonia was assassinated during the events. Mutinies continued; due to the few weeks later Pau Claris, president of the Generalitat of Catalonia, formed a Junta de Braços or Braços Generals (States-General), a consultive body similar to the Courts.

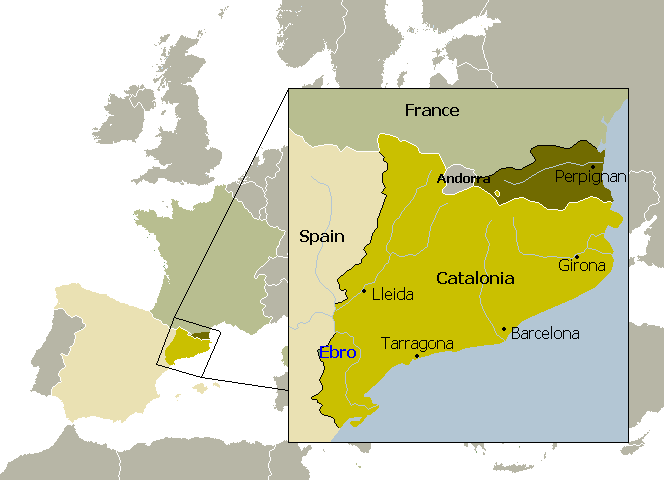
Partition of the Principality of Catalonia (1659)

The calling was a success, and the presence of cities and feudal villages was exceptionally large. The assembly assumed the sovereignty and began to enact and apply various revolutionary measures, such as the establishment of a Council of Justice, a Council of Defense to respond to the expected Royal counter-attack and a Council of Treasury which began to issue debt and a special tax to the nobility, while maintained diplomatic contacts with the Kingdom of France, allowing the French army to cross the Pyrenees into the Iberian Peninsula. After the fall of Tortosa to the royal armies, the break with the Spanish Monarchy became evident and the military clashes began. The Spanish armies perpetrated a massacre in Cambrils on 16 December, convincing Catalan leadership that they could not expect any pardon or negotiated solution from them.

With the Spanish royal armies approaching Barcelona, on 17 January 1641 the Junta de Braços accepted the establishment of the Catalan Republic under the protection of France, however a week later the Catalan institutions, needing more French military aid, accepted King Louis XIII as Count of Barcelona. Combined Catalan and French armies defeated the Spanish armies at the gates of Barcelona, in the battle of Montjuïc, on 26 January 1641. The French general Marquis of Brézé, Marshal of France was appointed viceroy of Catalonia, and the Franco-Catalan forces obtained victories in Montmeló and Lleida. However, the French administration increased its control over the Principality, and some of the same conflicts between peasants and soldiers, but this time French ones, erupted.

After major setbacks, from 1644 onwards a renewed offensive of the Spanish troops took Lleida, driven out the French and crushed the Catalan forces. Although the French were initially able to resist the offensive, the outbreak of the Fronde in 1651 diverted their efforts and by 1652 Barcelona fell after a one-year siege; most of the Principality of Catalonia was once again under control of the Monarchy of Spain, With the aim to avoid a prolongation of the conflict, Philip IV recognized in 1644 most of the rights of Catalonia. When the war between Spain and France ended in 1659, the peace treaty ceded the Catalan territories north of the Pyrenees, the counties of Roussillon and the northern half of Cerdanya, to France. Catalan institutions were suppressed in the French Roussillon, in 1700, public use of Catalan language was prohibited. Today, this region is administratively part of French Département of Pyrénées-Orientales.

=== War of the Spanish Succession ===
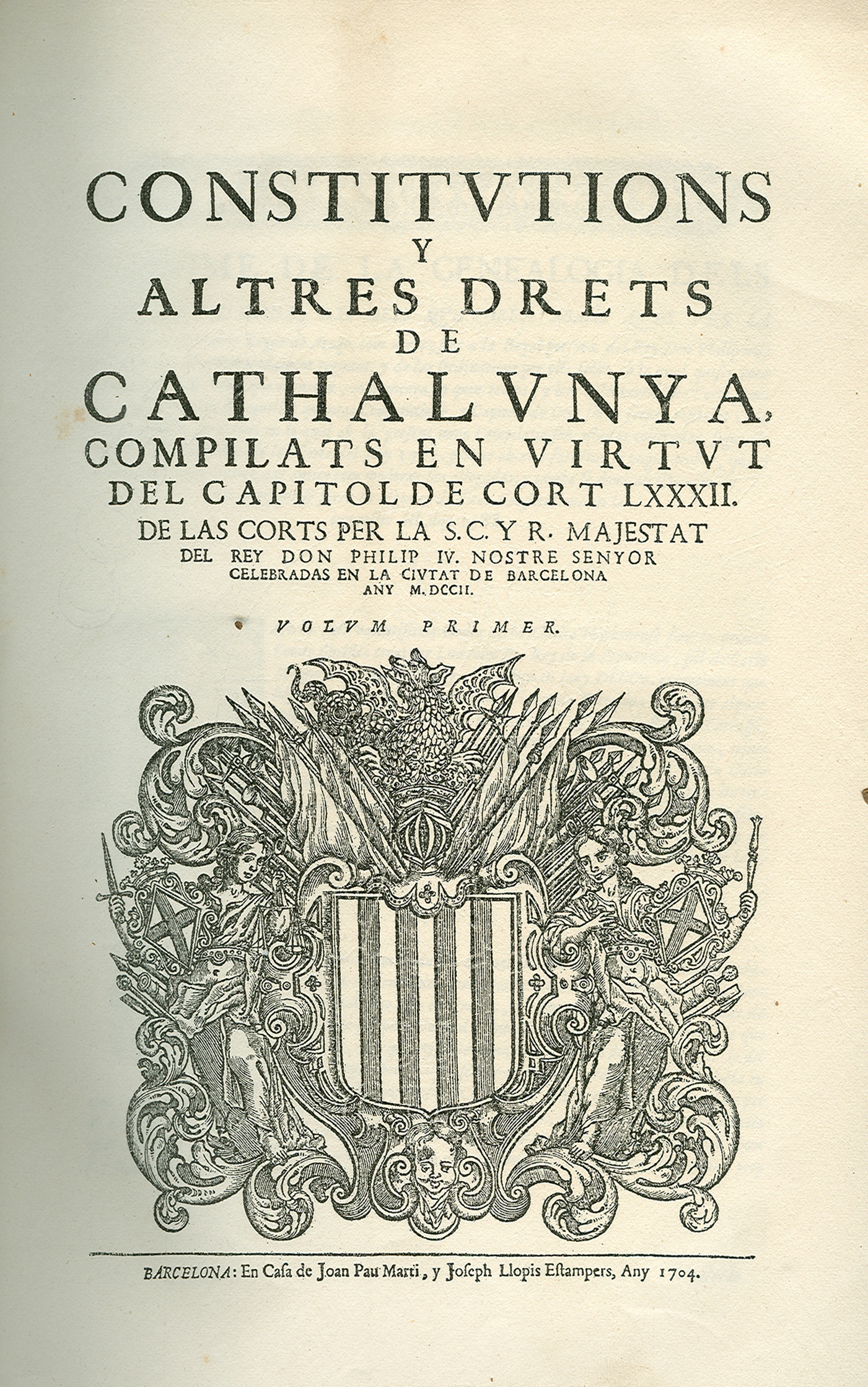
1704 compilation of the Constitutions of Catalonia

In the last decades of the 17th century during the reign of Spain's last Habsburg king, Charles II, despite intermittent conflict between Spain and France, the population increased to approximately 500,000 inhabitants and the Catalan economy improved, not only in Barcelona, but also along the Catalan coast and even in some inland areas. The economic growth was boosted by the export of wine to England and the Dutch Republic because due to the trade war of French minister Jean-Baptiste Colbert against the Dutch and later to the participation of these countries in the Nine Years' War against France, they were not able to trade with the French. This new context caused many Catalans to look to England and, especially, the Netherlands as political and economic models for Catalonia.

However, at the end of the century, after the death of the childless Charles II (1700), the Crown of Spain went to his chosen successor, Philip V of the House of Bourbon. The Grand Alliance of Austria, England and the United Provinces gave military support to a Habsburg claimant of the crown, Archduke Charles as Charles III of Spain, resulting in the War of the Spanish Succession (1701–14). The Principality of Catalonia initially accepted Philip V following prolonged negotiations between Philip V and the General Court of Catalonia between 12 October 1701 and 14 January 1702, which resulted in an agreement where Catalonia retained all its previous privileges and gained a Court of Contraventions (Tribunal de Contrafaccions), the status of free port (Port Franc) for Barcelona as well as the limited right to commerce with America, but this did not last. Repressive measures of the viceroy Francisco de Velasco and authoritarian decisions of the king (some of them contrary to Catalan legislation), as well as the economic policy and distrust to the French absolutism caused Catalonia to switch sides. In 1705 the Archduke entered Barcelona, which was recognized as king in 1706 by the last Catalan Courts.

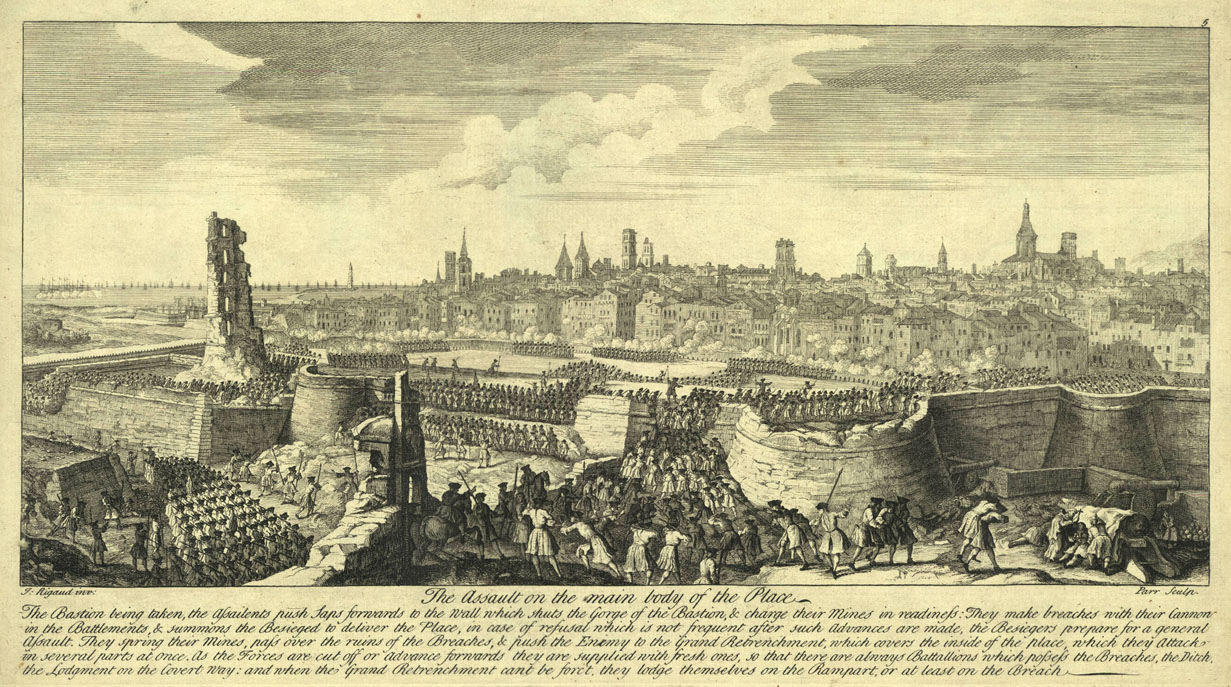
Bourbon's army entered Barcelona, 11 September 1714

After a series of advances and stalemates of both sides, geopolitical changes in Europe led to peace with the signature of the Treaty of Utrecht (1713), ending the possibility of Catalonia's resistance to Bourbon rule. Despite the evacuation of the Allied armies, in July 1713 the Junta de Braços of Catalonia opted to unilaterally remain in the war in order to protect Catalan rights and lives from Bourbon punishment, rising the Army of Catalonia and attempting to obtain help from Britain and Austria. After thirteen months of siege by Spanish and French armies which included pro-Habsburg uprisings in Catalonia's countryside, Barcelona capitulation on 11 September 1714. The Bourbon king, determined to punish what he saw as sedition from the realms of the Crown of Aragon promulgated the Nueva Planta decrees (1707 for Aragon and Valencia, 1715 for Majorca and 1716 for Catalonia), abolishing the Catalan, Majorcan, Valencian and Aragonese institutions and rights, and with it the Catalan Courts, the Generalitat, the Consell de Cent of Barcelona and the Catalan constitutions, except those of civil law, replacing them with the Castilian ones and establishing absolutism as the new form of government, thus, ending their status as separate political entities. In order to ensure it, he created a new Royal Audience as seat of government of the province and replaced the traditional vegueries with Castilian corregimientos as the territorial division of Catalonia. (Note: The borders of the corregimientos were originally set by the edict of the Captain General of Catalonia Francisco Pío de Saboya.) Rooted in the absolutist political position of Philip V, the assimilation of the Crown of Aragon by the Crown of Castile through the Decrees was the first step in the creation of the Spanish nation state.

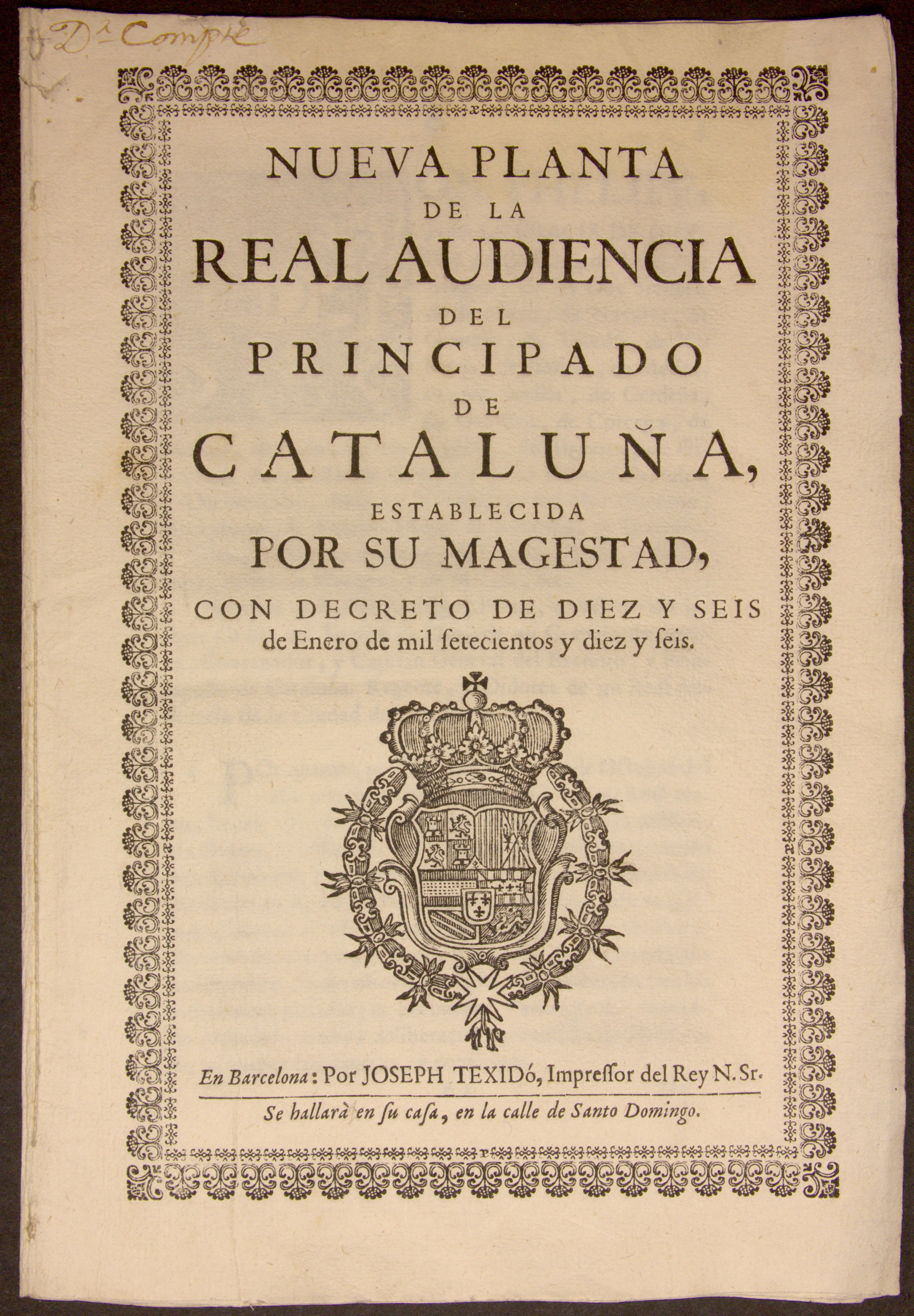
Cover of the Nueva Planta decree of the Principality of Catalonia (1716)

He suppressed the six Catalan universities and founded a new one in Cervera (Lleida) and abolished the administrative use of the Catalan language; replacing it with Spanish. While the replacement solely affected the Royal Audience, the king provided with secret instructions to the royal officers in Catalan territory: they "will take the utmost care to introduce the Castilian language, for which purpose he will give the most temperate and disguised measures so that the effect is achieved, without the care being noticed." Half a century later, under the reign of Charles III of Bourbon, the Catalan language would also be banned from primary and secondary schools.

=== The 18th century ===
Despite the harsh internal situation, including military occupation, banditry, new heavy taxation and the mercantilist policy of the House of Bourbon, Catalonia resumed the economic growth of the last third of the 17th century after the parentheses of the war, achieving a successful process of proto-industrialization in the course of the 18th century. The population and the economy both grew, agricultural production increased, and trade increased, complemented during the last quarter of the century with the opening of trade with America; all of these transformations tended, as in France, to undermine the Old Regime and lay the groundwork for the rise of industrialization, the first signs of which appeared in the 18th-century manufacture of cotton goods and other textiles. By the end of the 18th century, the popular classes began to experience the first effects of proletarianization.

In the 1790s, new conflicts arose on the French border, due to the French Revolution and the French Revolutionary Wars. In 1793, after the execution of Louis XVI of France, Spain signed with Great Britain his adhesion to the First Coalition against the French Republic, and soon after, France declared war on Spain. The War of the Pyrenees, known in Catalonia as the Guerra Gran ("Great War") has two main fronts: the eastern and the western Pyrenees. At first, the Spanish army entered in the Roussillon, reaching Perpignan, but the French army reacted and defeated them in Le Boulou and Colliure, penetrating in Catalonia and occupied the Empordà. The Sant Ferran Castle in Figueres (the largest fortress of the border) fell to the French after a brief siege. In 1795, after the stagnation of the front, France and Spain signed the Peace of Basel, restoring the status quo.

== Modern period (1808–1939) ==
=== Napoleonic Wars ===
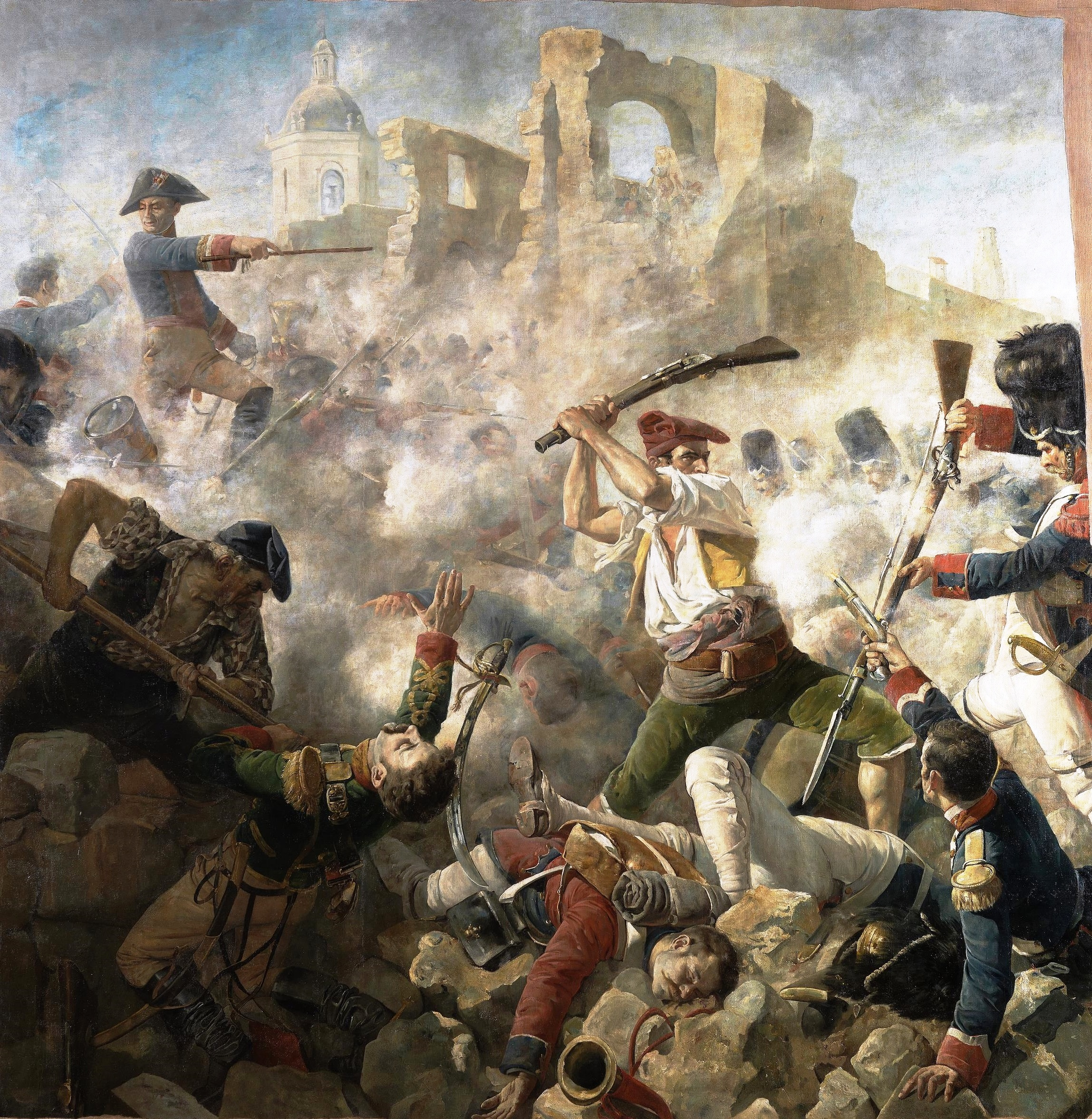
Third Siege of Girona (1809), Peninsular War

In 1808, during the Napoleonic Wars, Catalonia was occupied by the troops of General Guillaume Philibert Duhesme. The official Spanish army had evaporated, but popular resistance against the French occupation occurred in Catalonia as in other parts of Spain, and eventually developed into the Peninsular War. A local army defeated the French in a series of battles at El Bruc, near Barcelona. Meanwhile, Girona was besieged by the French and defended by its inhabitants under the direction of general and military governor Mariano Álvarez de Castro. The French finally took the city on 10 December 1809, after many deaths on both sides from hunger, epidemics, and cold; Álvarez de Castro died in prison one month later.

The rejection to French dominion was institutionalized with the creation of "juntas" (councils) across Spain who, remaining loyal to the Bourbons, exercised the sovereignty and representation of the territory due to the disappearance of the old institutions, and sending delegates to the Cortes of Cádiz. In Catalonia, the juntas of Catalan corregimientos established in Lleida the Superior Junta of the Government of the Principality of Catalonia which it declared itself as depositary of the faculties of the Royal Audience of Catalonia, as well as the legislative power. At the same time, Napoleon took direct control of Catalonia to establish order, creating the Government of Catalonia under the rule of Marshall Augereau, and making Catalan briefly an official language again. Between 1812 and 1813, Catalonia was directly annexed to France itself, and organized an ordinary civil administration in the form of four (later two) départements: Bouches-de-l'Èbre (prefecture: Lleida), Montserrat (Barcelona), Sègre (Puigcerdà), and Ter (Girona). French dominion in parts of Catalonia lasted until 1814, when the British General Wellington signed the armistice by which the French left Barcelona and the other strongholds that they had managed to keep until the last.

=== The Carlist wars and the liberal state ===
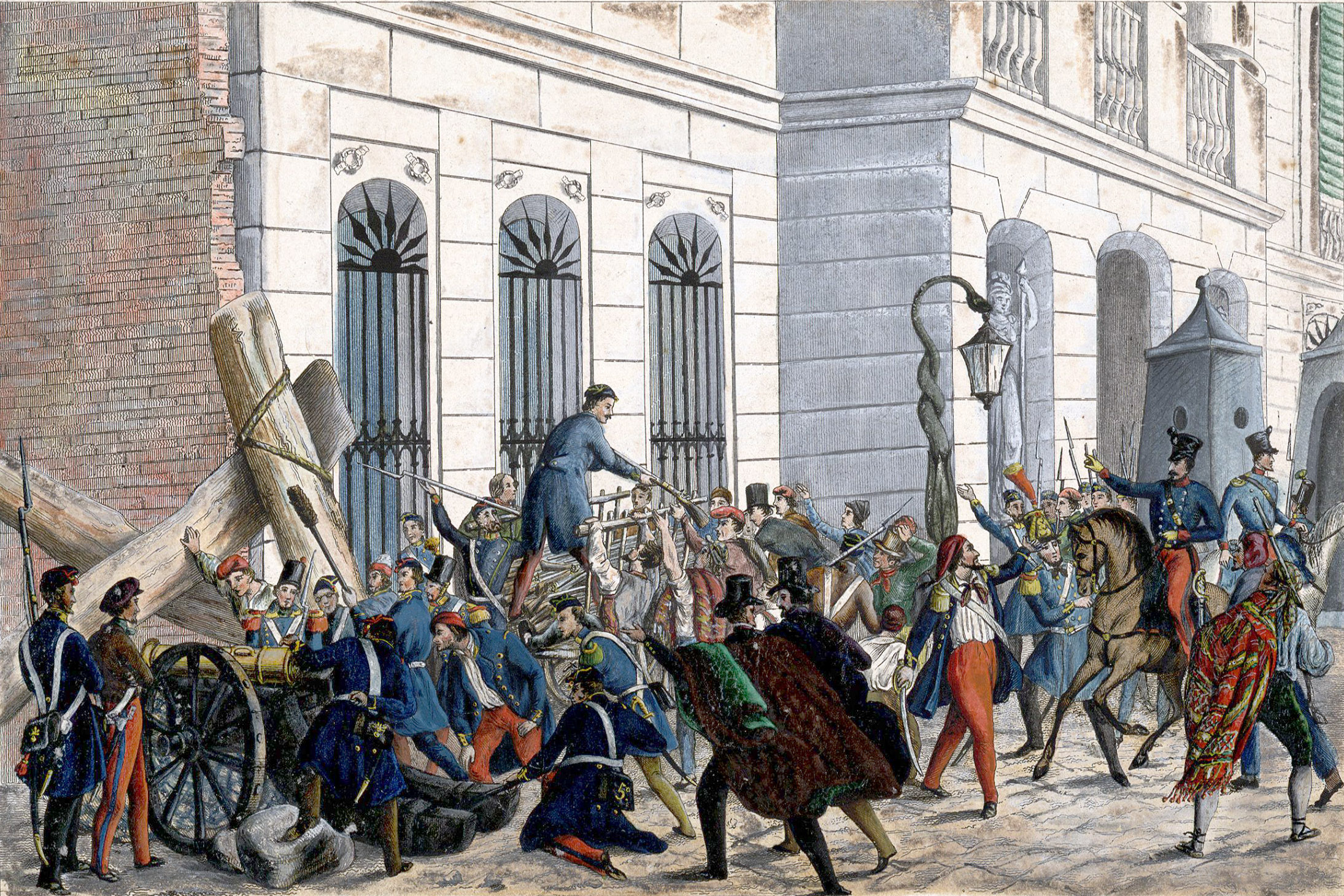
Catalan uprising of 1842

The reign of Ferdinand VII (reigned 1814–1833) saw several Catalan uprisings and after his death, the conflict over the succession between the absolutist "Carlist" partisans of Infante Carlos and the liberal partisans of Isabella II led to the First Carlist War, which lasted until 1840 and was especially virulent in the Catalan territory. Catalonia was divided. The most industrialized areas support liberalism and the Catalan bourgeoisie tries to contribute to the construction of the new liberal state. As with the Basques, many Catalans fought on the Carlist side, not necessarily because they supported absolute monarchy, but because some of them hoped that restoration of the Old Regime would mean restoration of their fueros and recovery of regional autonomy.

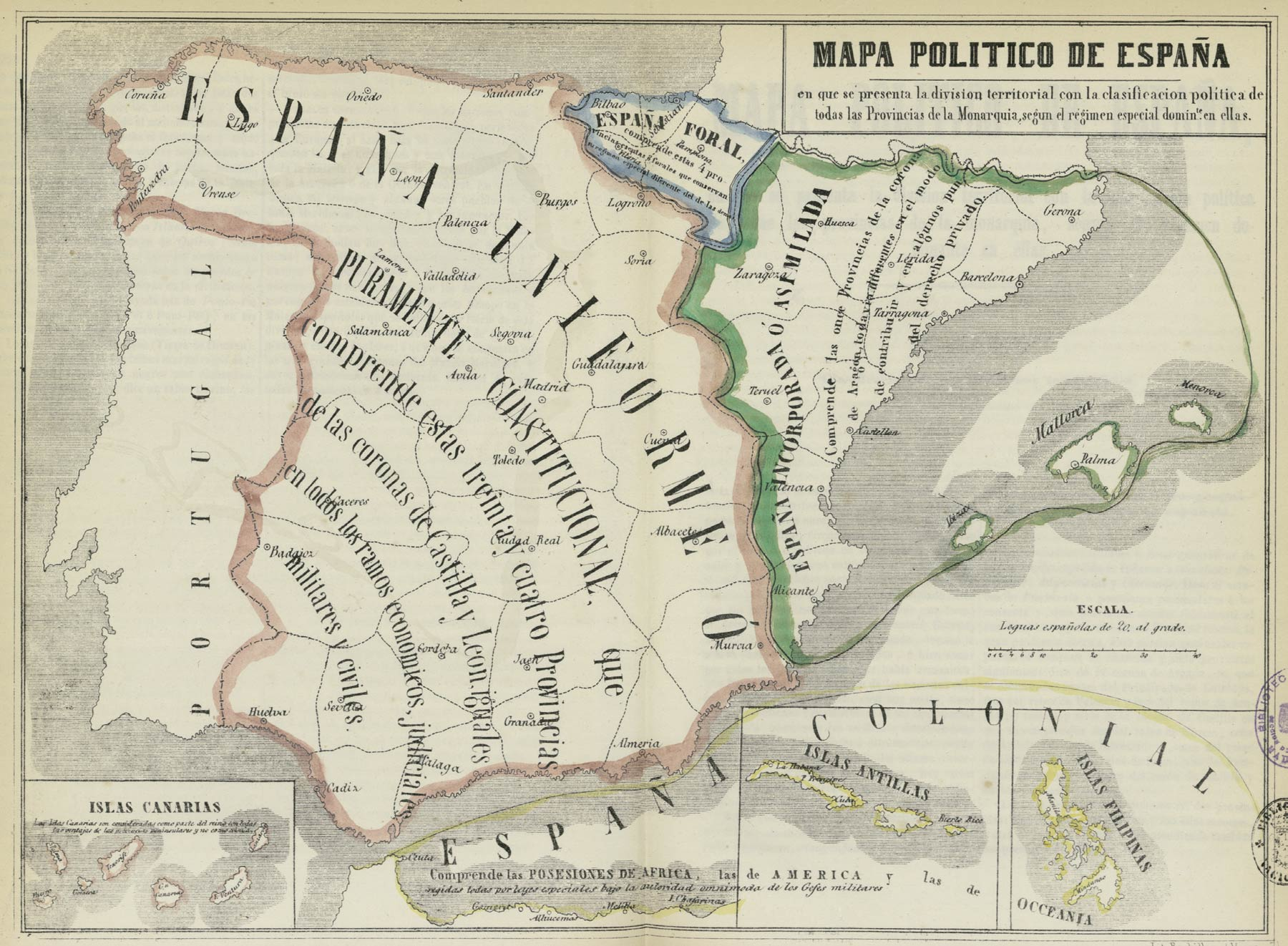
Political map of Spain (1850), divided into four parts: The Fully constitutional Spain (brown), most of the former Crown of Castile; Assimilated Spain (green), the former Crown of Aragon, including Catalonia; Foral Spain (blue), the Basque-speaking territories; and Colonial Spain (yellow)

The victory of the liberals over the absolutists led to a "bourgeois revolution" during the reign of Isabella II. In 1834, by decree of minister Javier de Burgos, Spain was organized into provinces, included Catalonia, which was divided in four provinces (Barcelona, Girona, Lleida and Tarragona) without a common administration. The reign of Isabella II was marked by corruption, administrative inefficiency, centralism, and political and social tensions. The liberals soon divided into "moderates" and "progressives", and in Catalonia a republican current began to develop; also, inevitably, Catalans generally favored a more federal Spain. During the second third of the century, there were various progressive uprisings in Barcelona and other places, known as bullangues. The last insurrection of the period, the Jamància (1843), which tried to expel the government of General Espartero and proposed a progressive program and postulates close to federalism, ended with Barcelona blocked and bombed by the army, representing the triumph of the moderates and its centralist politics.

The Second Carlist War (1846–1849) took place fundamentally in Catalonia, largely promoted by the displeasure of large sectors of the population with the moderate model of the liberal state that was being established at that time. This explains the collaboration of the progressives and republicans with the Carlists in 1848, coinciding with the democratic revolutions in France and the rest of Europe.

When General O'Donnell, leader of the Liberal Union, was appointed as prime minister in 1856 seems that the relationship between Catalan society and the Spanish government became more hopeful. Surprisingly, the reaction in Catalonia to the Hispano-Moroccan War was enthusiastic, and it was organized a company of Catalan volunteers that were received in Africa by the General Joan Prim, born in Reus. The fall of the government of the Liberal Union without being able to accomplish the expected reforms and the return of the moderates to power ended the hopes of Catalan society.

La Campana de Gràcia, pro-republican Catalan weekly magazine, founded in 1870

In September 1868, Spain's continuing economic crisis triggered the September Revolution or La Gloriosa, resulting in the deposition of Isabella II and beginning the so-called Sexenio Democrático, the "six democratic years" (1868–1874). As usual, popular revolts and juntas were formed across the country, until the new government ordered its dissolution. General Joan Prim was appointed Prime Minister of the Provisional Government (1869–1870), his government called to a parliamentary election by universal manhood suffrage for the first time in order to establish the political future of Spain. In Catalonia, federalists republicans won the overall majority of seats, while the general results in Spain gave a victory to a progressive monarchist coalition. Spain was declared a democratic monarchy and Amadeo of Savoy elected new king. Few days before the arrival of Amadeo, Prim was assassinated. Meanwhile, the federalists republicans of Catalonia, Aragon, Valencia and Balearic Islands signed the Federal Pact of Tortosa (1869) and there was a federalist revolt at the same year.

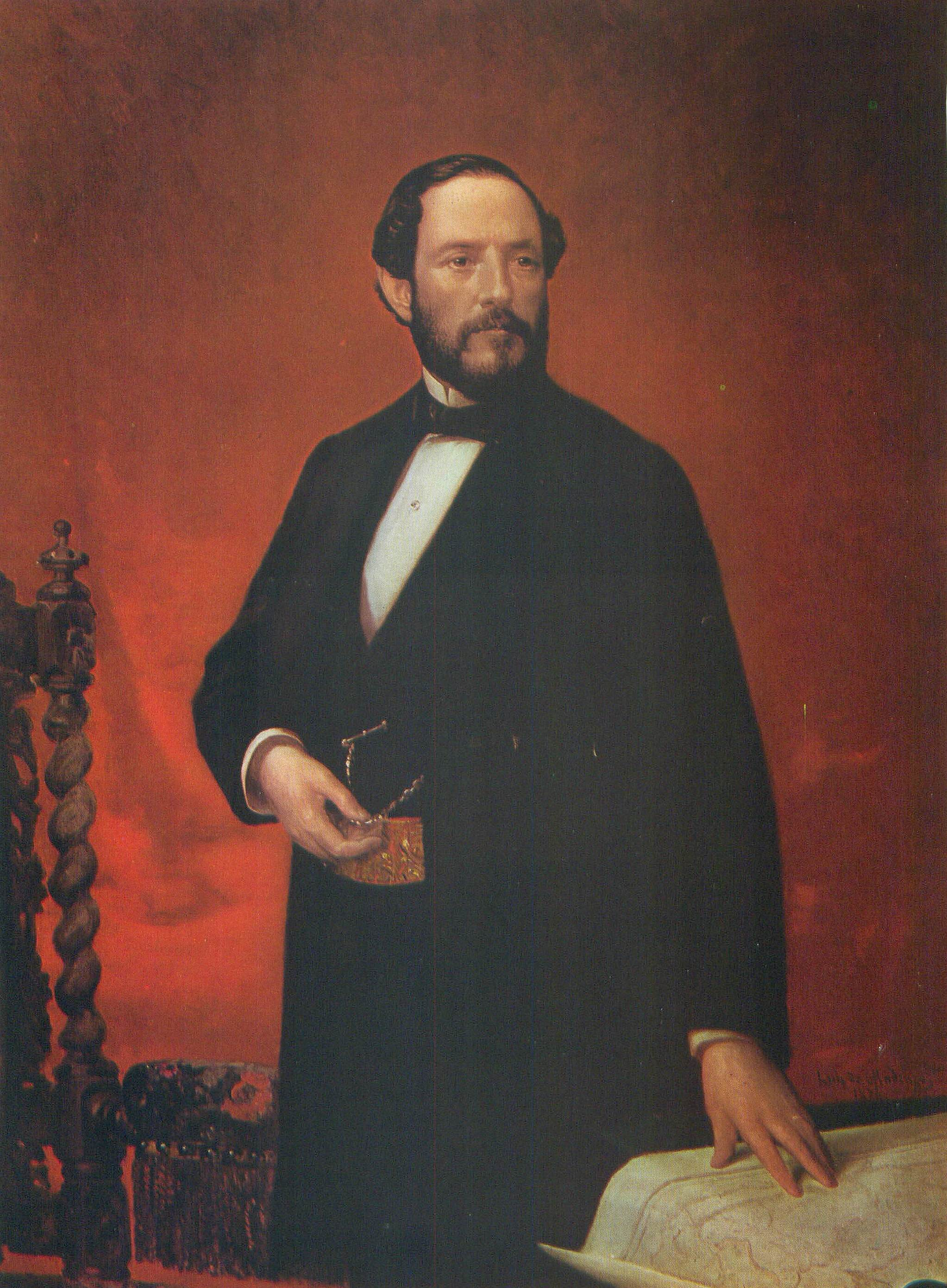
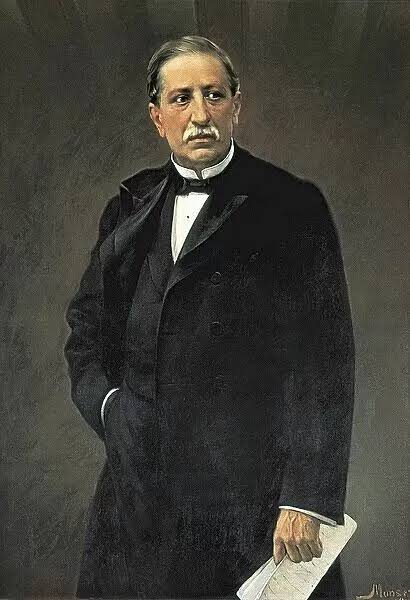
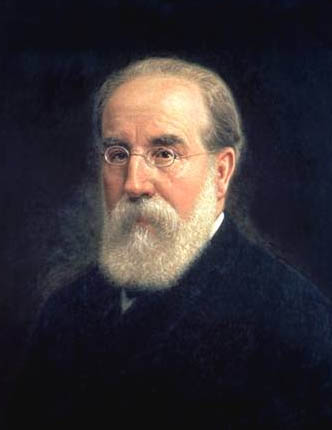
Joan Prim, Estanislau Figueras and Francesc Pi i Margall were Catalan presidents of the government of Spain

The rise of Amadeo I to the throne of Spain (1870–1873) proved unstable, his reign saw the outbreak of the Third Carlist War (1872–1876), Cuba's fight for independence, the spread of the ideas of the First International and economic troubles, ending with the resignation of the king. This decision allowed the proclamation of the First Spanish Republic (1873–1874). The Republic fought against the inherited problems and with others like the cantonal insurrection. During its short existence it was unable to establish a federal republic and it had four presidents. Its first presidents, Estanislau Figueras and Francesc Pi i Margall, were Catalans. Along the period there were attempts from radical federalists to proclaim a federated Catalan State. After the fall of president Emilio Castelar, the General Pavia made a coup d'état, disbanding the Cortes and appointed General Serrano as president without parliamentary control.

=== Industrialization, Renaixença and Modernisme ===
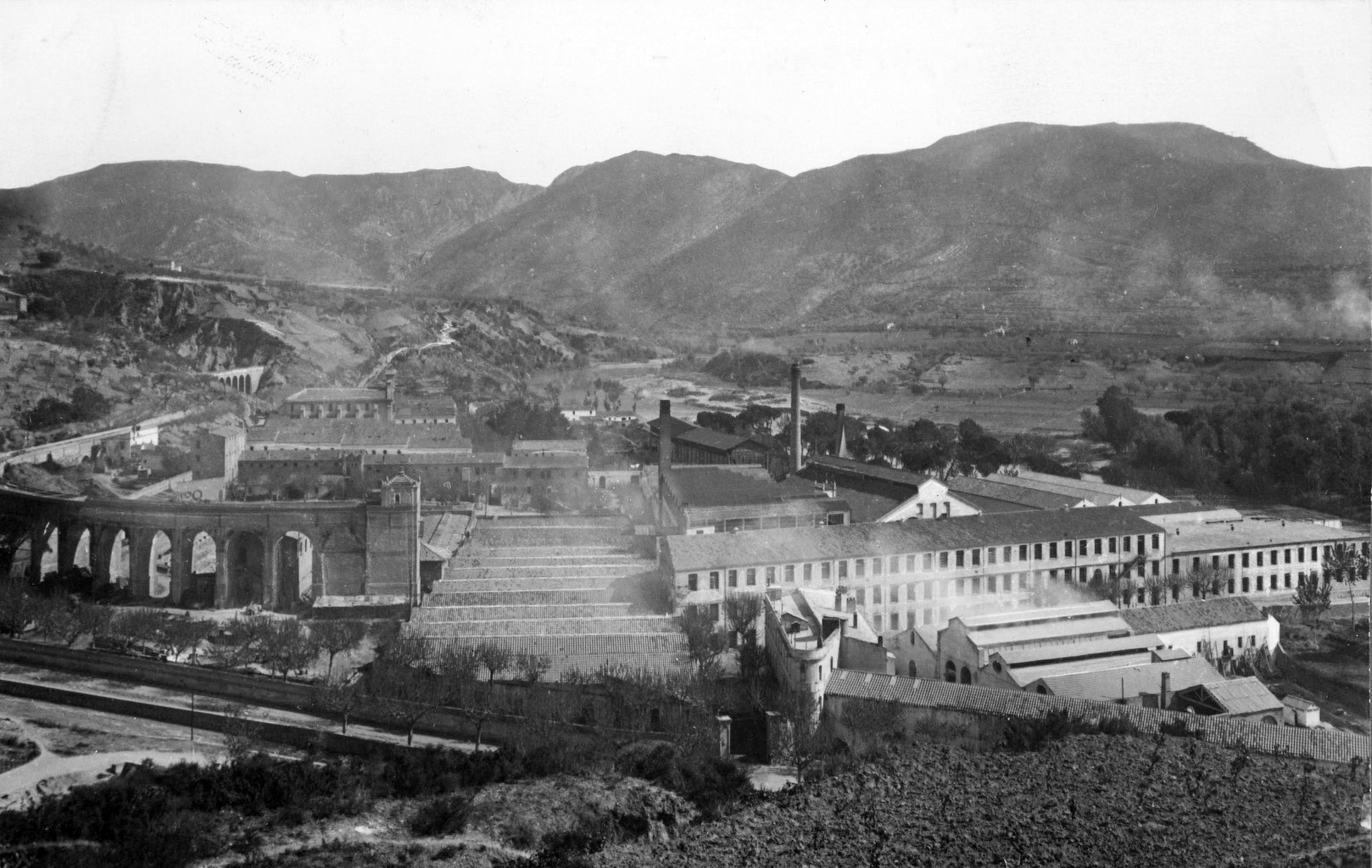
Colònia Sedó, Company Town

Since the 1830s, boosted by the conditions of proto-industrialization of the prior two centuries of the Catalan urban areas and its countryside, Catalonia became a centre of Spain's industrialization and it became one of the largest textile producers in the Mediterranean. In 1832 the Bonaplata Factory was established, the first industrial establishment in the country to make use of the steam engine. Catalonia had to contend with a grave shortage of energy resources and the weakness of the domestic Spanish market. To encourage industrial expansion, Spain established protectionist policies which reduced foreign competition domestically (although the policy of Spanish government during those times changed many times between free trade and protectionism). Catalonia saw the first railway construction in the Iberian Peninsula in 1848, linking Barcelona with Mataró, built with private capital. These initiatives partially benefitted the country's industrial regions, Catalonia, the Basque Country and later Asturias. As in much of Europe, the working class lived and worked in often inhuman conditions.

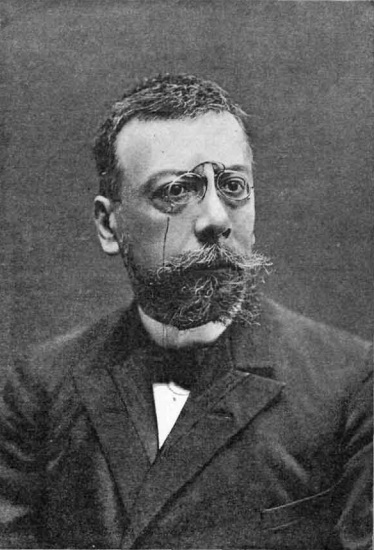
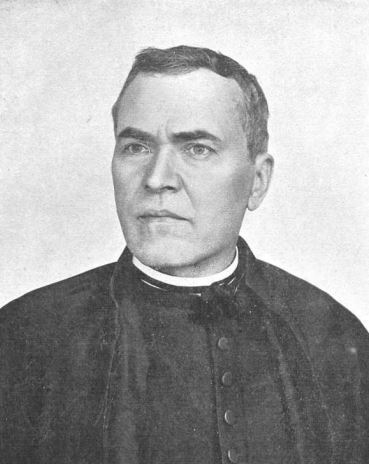
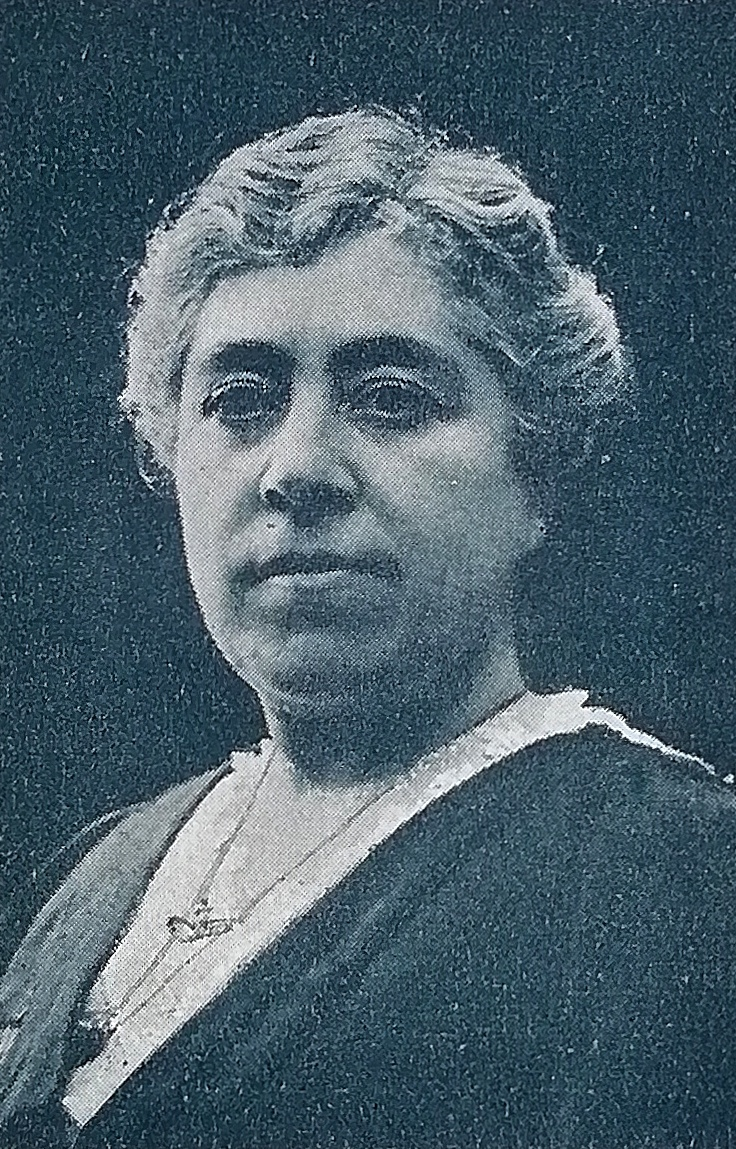
Significant Catalan writers of the 19th and early 20th century, from left to right: Àngel Guimerà, Jacint Verdaguer and Caterina Albert

As a response to the lack of energy resources, a large number of factories were installed on the margins of the rivers when the use of the water turbine widespread. Usually, the factories included a company town; Catalonia has a high density of such towns, known locally as industrial colonies (colònies industrials). They are especially concentrated in river basins along the Ter and Llobregat. In the comarca of Berguedà, for example, within 20 km there were 14 colonies. These were small towns created around a factory, built in a rural areas, distant any other population centres. They housed between 100 and 500 inhabitants, and in some cases around 1000 people. These industrial colonies were a typical aspect of industrialization in Catalonia, specifically the second industrialization, which resulted in certain areas that were once purely rural becoming industrial. They were first created in the second half of the nineteenth century, especially from the 1870s onwards. The last colonies were created in the early years of the twentieth century. There are more than 75 textile colonies recorded; although there were also mining, metallurgy and agricultural colonies.

During the 19th century, as well as other Spaniards, there were Catalan business involved in the Atlantic slave trade, taking advantage of the void left by the British abolition of the trade in 1807. Catalan immigrants in Spanish America also became heavily involved in owning and running slave plantations in Cuba and Puerto Rico. Between 1817 and 1867, Catalans were involved in the transportation of 550,000 to 700,000 slaves from West Africa to the Caribbean. Although the Spanish government had abolished slave trading in 1817, it turned a blind eye to illicit slave trading. When slavery was abolished in the Spanish Empire in 1886, some Catalans returned to Catalonia and invested their newfound fortunes in constructing opulent mansions in areas such as La Rambla. There are sources that links the slave trade with the financiation of the industrialisation of Catalonia and the 19th-century building boom in Barcelona, although the industrialization started one century before, banks were the usual source of finantiation, and most families involved has any relation with American slavery.

The second third of the 19th century saw a Catalan cultural renaissance (Renaixença), a cultural movement to recover Catalan language and culture after a long period of decay. As with most of the other Romantic movements, it was noted for its admiration of the Middle Ages, which was often reflected in art and, in Barcelona, the literary contest known as Floral Games (Jocs Florals) was revived. The historical research of Antoni de Capmany, the interest in normalizing the Catalan language and the emergence of an incipient intellectuality interested in popular culture are already produced during the Enlightenment. Josep Pau Ballot wrote "Gramatica y apología de la llengua cathalana" between 1810 and 1813, during the French occupation. This work is realized with patriotic intention and disseminator of the use of Catalan. Between 1833 and the reestablishment of the Floral Games in 1859, the Catalan language lives in a situation of disglossy: many authors of the Renaixença wrote some literature and poetry in Catalan, but they will continue to use Spanish in their main works. However, the popular classes continued to use Catalan, and during this period popular theater in Catalan became relevant, unlike the representations of the Liceu addressed to the bourgeoisie, which used Spanish.

=== Catalan nationalism and the workers movement ===
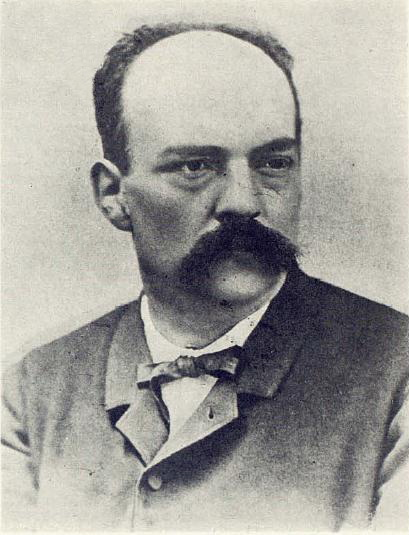
Valentí Almirall

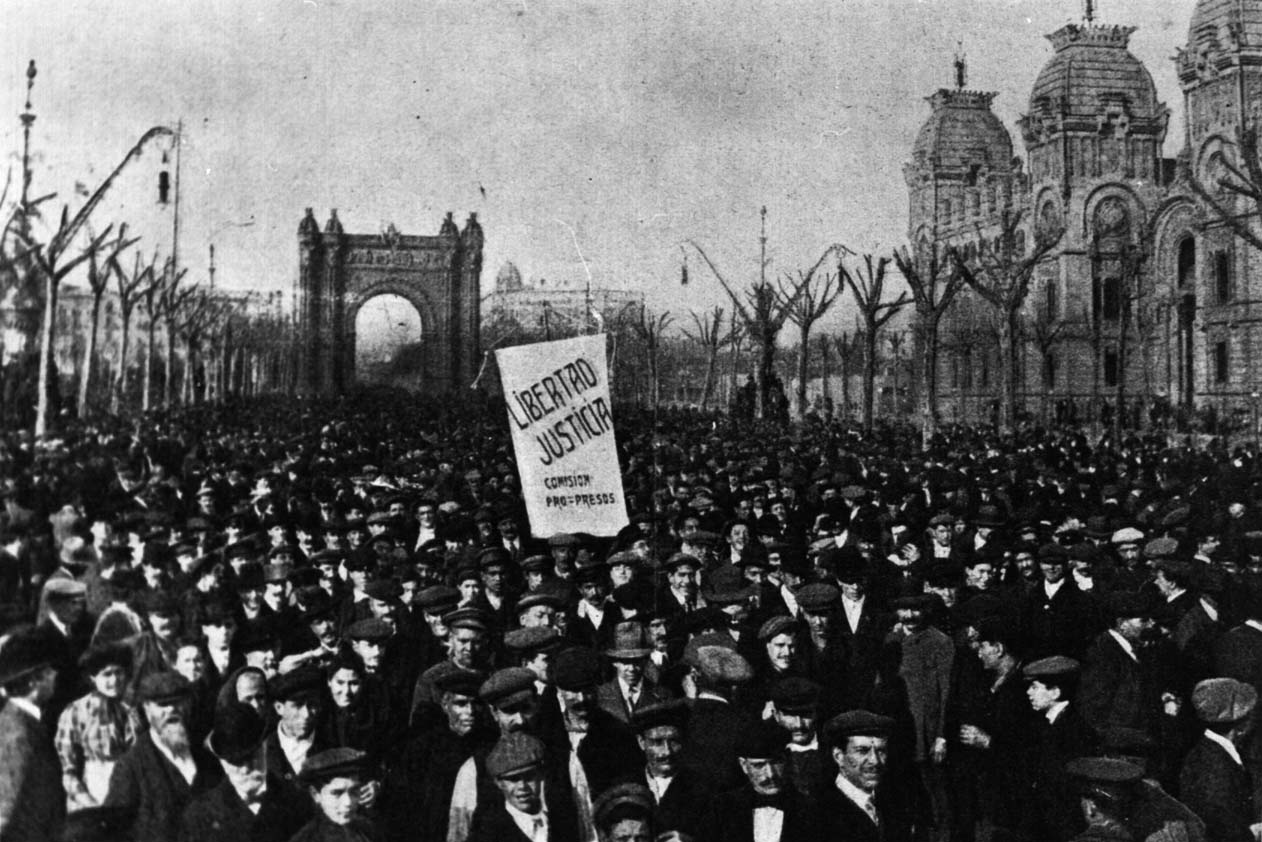
Demonstration after the Tragic Week, 1909

In 1874, a coup by General Martínez Campos in Sagunto led to a restoration of the Bourbon dynasty in the person of Alfonso XII. A period of political stability, of repression of the workers movement, and of a slow growth in Catalan nationalist identity extended to the early years of the 20th century, when once again political opposition broke to the fore, especially republicanism and Catalan nationalism, but also class-based politics reflecting social tensions.

The following decades saw the rise of the political Catalanism still prevalent today: the first formulations of the modern Catalan national identity can be seen in Valentí Almirall, a relevant federalist republican. Almirall, despite being a left-wing republican, tried to unite the Catalan left and right, but he did not succeed because there were too many divergences between the two currents. He promoted the First Catalanist Congress, held in 1880, in which the different Catalanist groups were united: federal republicanism and the apolitical current, the literary one, from La Renaixença magazine, but the leftist tendencies of Almirall caused that the group of the Renaixença left the Congress and broke the agreement. However, the Congress took three fundamental agreements: creating an entity that brings together Catalanism (the Centre Català, "Catalan Center"), the beginning of efforts to establish the Academy of the Catalan Language, and the drafting of a document on defense of Catalan as official language. The crisis of the Centre Català was shown due the differences around the position about the 1888 Barcelona Universal Exposition. The opposite positions led to the dissolution of the group, and the left-wing Catalan nationalism was seriously weakened for decades.

The conservative elements of Catalan nationalism founded the League of Catalonia in 1887 who, in 1891, were united with the group La Renaixença, creating the Unió Catalanista (Catalanist Union). The Unió redacted, in 1892, the Basis of Catalan regional autonomy, also known as Bases de Manresa, a program that demanded a specific autonomy for Catalonia. In 1901 Enric Prat de la Riba and Francesc Cambó formed the Regionalist League (Lliga Regionalista), which in 1906 led the successful electoral coalition Solidaritat Catalana, created by diverse Catalan political groups (from conservative to Catalan left-wing nationalists and from republicanism to carlism) as a response to Cu-Cut! affair, in which officers of the Spanish Army, angry with this satirical magazine for publish an offending joke about the war in Morocco, stormed the Cu-Cut! offices, and the subsequent "Ley de Jurisdicciones", that punish the "crimes" and "insults" against the army and the symbols of the nation, putting them under military trials.

Catalan nationalism, under the leadership of Prat de la Riba, achieved in 1913 a victory in obtaining partial self-government for the "Commonwealth" (Catalan: Mancomunitat; Spanish: Mancomunidad), a grouping of the four Catalan provinces, presided over first by Prat de la Riba, and later by Josep Puig i Cadafalch; this was later suppressed in March 1925, during the 1923–1930 dictatorship of Miguel Primo de Rivera. The Commonwealth of Catalonia established a modern infrastructure, such as roads and telephones and expanded the culture (libraries, professional education, use and regulation of Catalan language, promotion of sciences...). In 1919, the Commonwealth promoted the first project of Statute of Autonomy, but the disagreements with the government of Madrid, the opposition of sectors of Spanish society and the coincidence with the rise of the workers movement provoked the fall of the project.

Estelada, flag used by Estat Català and the most representative symbol of Catalan independence movement from the 1920s onwards

The Catalan workers movement at the turn of the twentieth century consisted of three tendencies: syndicalism, socialism, and anarchism, part of the last openly embracing "propaganda of the deed" as advocated by Alejandro Lerroux. Along with Asturias, Catalonia in general and Barcelona in particular was a center of radical labor agitation, marked by numerous general strikes, assassinations (especially in the late 1910s), and the rise of the pro-anarchist Confederación Nacional del Trabajo (National Confederation of Labour, CNT, founded in Barcelona in 1910). Growing resentment of conscription and of the military culminated in the Tragic Week in Barcelona in 1909, resulting in the deaths of over 100 citizens. The anarchists had been active throughout the early 20th century, achieving, after a successful strike which paralyzed much of the industry of Catalonia, the first eight-hour workday of Western Europe in 1919. The escalating violence between Catalan workers and the Catalan bourgeoisie (Pistolerismo) led the latter to embrace the dictatorship of Primo de Rivera, despite his centralizing tendencies. (See also Anarchism in Spain).

The initial acceptance of the Dictatorship by the conservative League made the Catalan nationalism progressively more leftist (with the rise of parties as Acció Catalana, Catalan Republican Party or the Socialist Union of Catalonia) and, some of them, also pro-independence (Estat Català). Despite this tolerance, Primo de Rivera abolished the Commonwealth of Catalonia in 1925 and started a policy of repression against the Catalan nationalism, Catalan language and labour movement (especially anarchism and communism). In 1926, Estat Català tried to liberate Catalonia with a little army (established in the town of Prats de Molló in Roussillon, France), led by Francesc Macià, and proclaim the independent Catalan Republic, but the complot was discovered by the French police. Macià and the Catalan issue gained popularity all over the world.

During the last steps of the Dictatorship, Barcelona celebrated the 1929 International Exposition, while Spain started to suffer an economical crisis caused by the economical policy of the government and the Wall Street crash.

=== Republic and autonomy ===
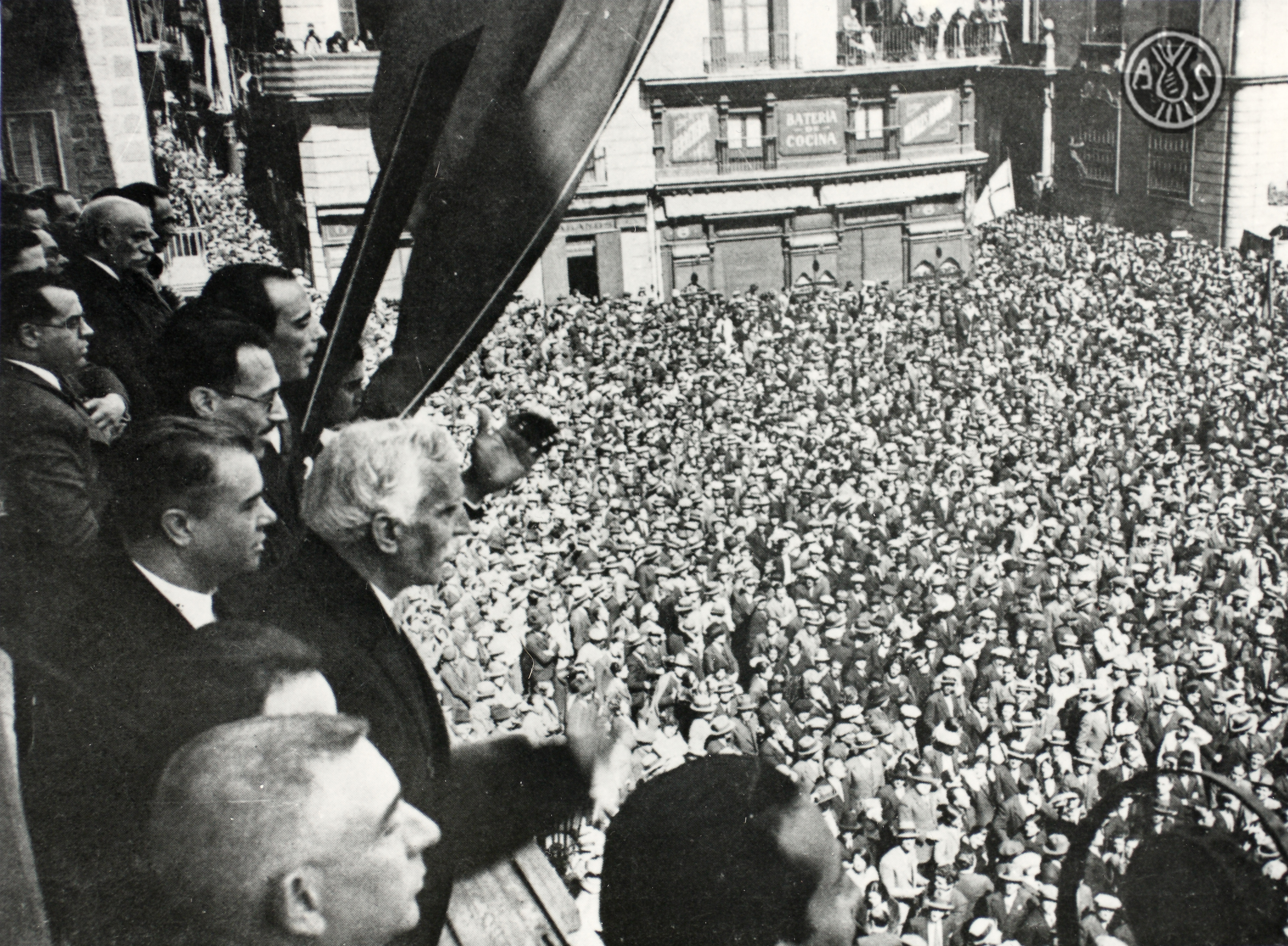
Francesc Macià proclaiming the Catalan Republic on 14 April 1931 in Barcelona

After the fall of Primo de Rivera, the Catalan left made great efforts to create a united front under the leadership of left-wing independentist leader Francesc Macià, founder of Estat Català. The Esquerra Republicana de Catalunya (Republican Left of Catalonia, or ERC) represented a break with the electoral abstentionism that, until then had been characteristic of the Catalan workers. Advocating moderate socialism, republicanism and Catalan self-determination, the party achieved a spectacular victory in the municipal elections of 12 April 1931, which preceded the 14 April proclamation of the Second Spanish Republic. After a brief proclamation of the Catalan Republic (14–17 April) by the ERC leader, Francesc Macià, the Generalitat of Catalonia was revived as an autonomous government, and a Statute of Autonomy for Catalonia was approved on 9 September 1932 by the Cortes of the Republic after many discussions and political difficulties that considerably amended the original project. The Statute gave a strong, though not absolute, grant of self-government, and declared Catalan as official language in Catalonia alongside Spanish. A similar statute granted autonomy to the Basque Country, few years later. The Parliament of Catalonia was elected on 20 November 1932, and ERC won a large majority of seats, while the Regionalist League, almost hegemonic during the Monarchy, came in second place but far behind ERC.

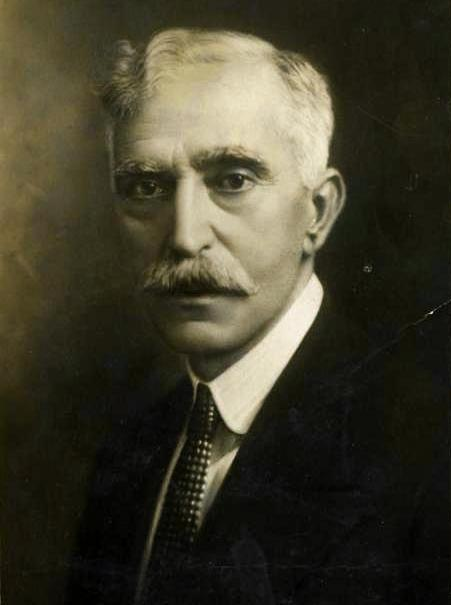
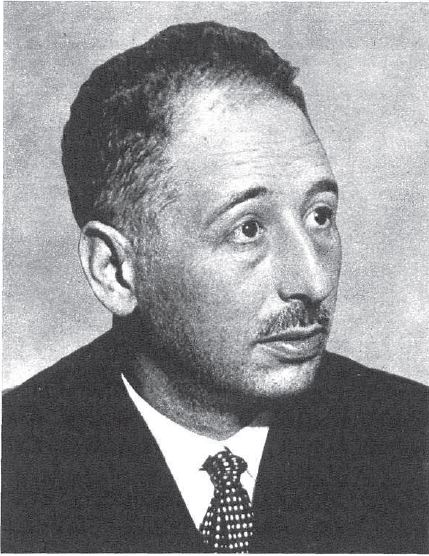
Left: Francesc Macià, first President of the restored Generalitat of Catalonia (1931–1933) Right: Lluís Companys, second President of the Generalitat (1933–1940), executed by Franco's regime

Under its two presidents, Francesc Macià (1931–1933) and Lluís Companys (1934–1939), the Republican Generalitat, democratically led by the left, carried out a considerable task in different areas such as culture, health, education and civil law, despite the serious economic crisis that the Republic inherited, its social repercussions, the low fiscal autonomy granted by the Statute, and the political vicissitudes of the period. On 25 December 1933 Macià died and the Parliament appointed Companys as new president. Under his presidency, the Parliament continued to legislate in order to improve the living conditions of the popular classes and the petite bourgeoisie, approving laws like the Crop Contracts Law, which protected the tenant farmers and granted access to the land they were cultivating, but it was contested by the Regionalist League and provoking a legal dispute with the Spanish government led by Ricardo Samper, rising the tensions. Meanwhile, the Generalitat established its own Court of Cassation (Catalan: Tribunal de Cassació) and assumed executive powers in public order. The Statute was suspended in 1934, due to an uprising in Barcelona on 6 October of that year. President Companys proclaimed the Catalan State of the Spanish Federal Republic, as a response to the accession of right-wing Spanish nationalist party CEDA to the government of the Republic. The CEDA was considered close to fascism and, therefore, they feared that it was the first step of this party to suppress the autonomy and take the power in Spain as Hitler and Dollfuss made in Germany and Austria. The proclamation was quickly suppressed by the Spanish army, and the Catalan Government members were arrested.

As for the workers' movement, there was a crisis in the CNT (the greatest trade union in Catalonia at the time) with the break-away faction in the 1930s and its hostility against the Republic as a bourgeoisie regime growth, realizing demonstrations, general strikes and proclamations of the libertarian communism in some places like in the Alt Llobregat mining area in 1932, while the Marxist parties were progressively unified with the formation of the Workers' Party of Marxist Unification (Spanish: Partido Obrero de Unificación Marxista, POUM) in September 1935 and Unified Socialist Party of Catalonia (Catalan: Partit Socialista Unificat de Catalunya, PSUC) in July 1936.

After the electoral victory of the left in the Spanish general election of February 1936 the government of the Generalitat was pardoned and reinstated in their functions. The period between that event and the military rebellion of July 1936 is considered as relatively peaceful in Catalonia, in contrast with the rest of Spain. The Parliament restored their legislative activities and the government prepared the People's Olympiad in Barcelona, as a response against the 1936 Summer Olympics held in Berlin, which was then under control of Nazi Germany, but the same day of its planned inauguration (19 July), the Spanish Army carried out a partially failed coup d'état which led to the Spanish Civil War.

=== Civil War ===
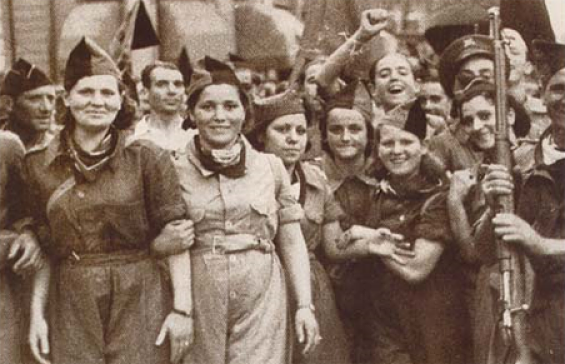
Spanish Revolution of 1936

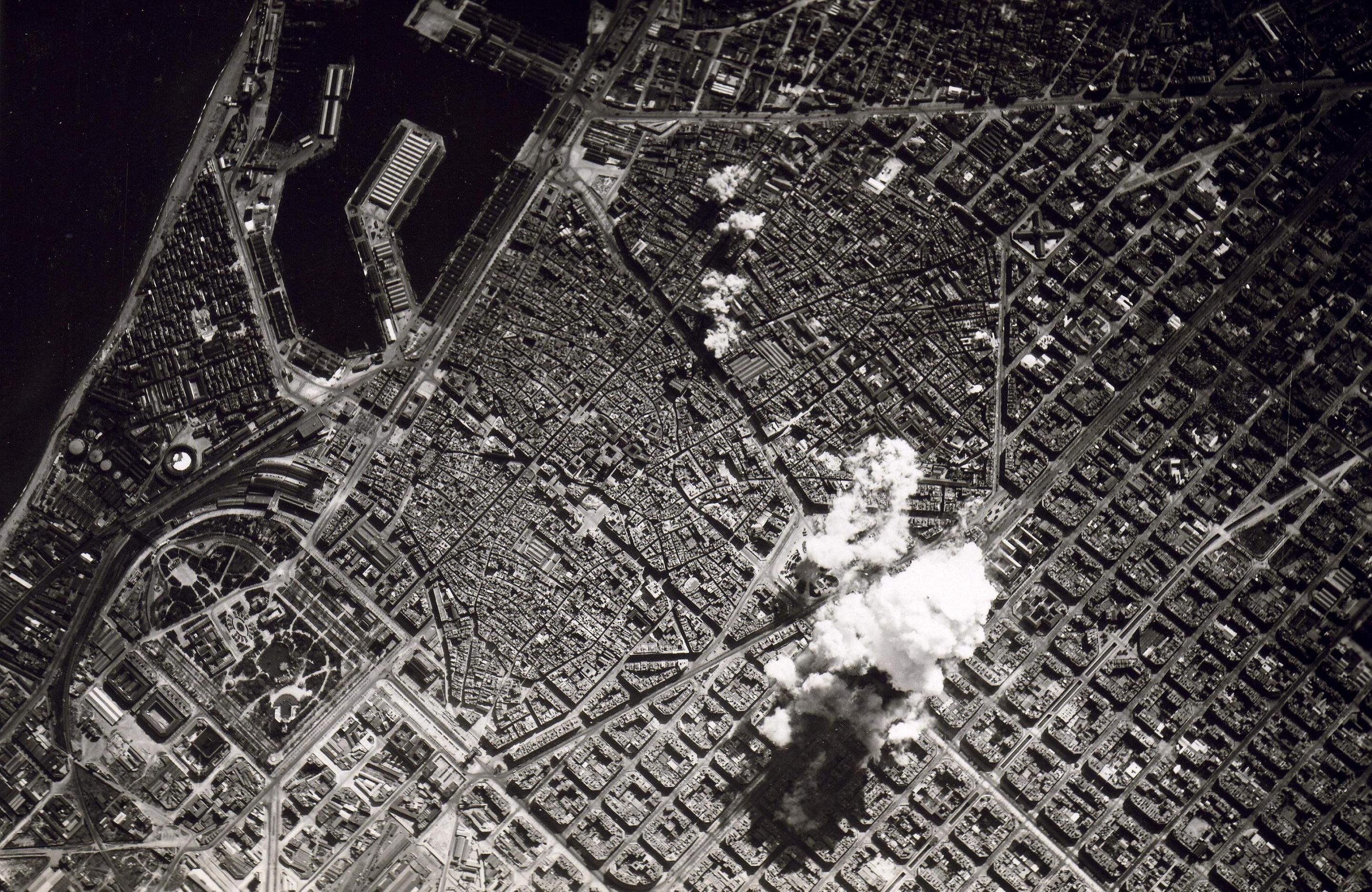
Bombing of Barcelona (1938)

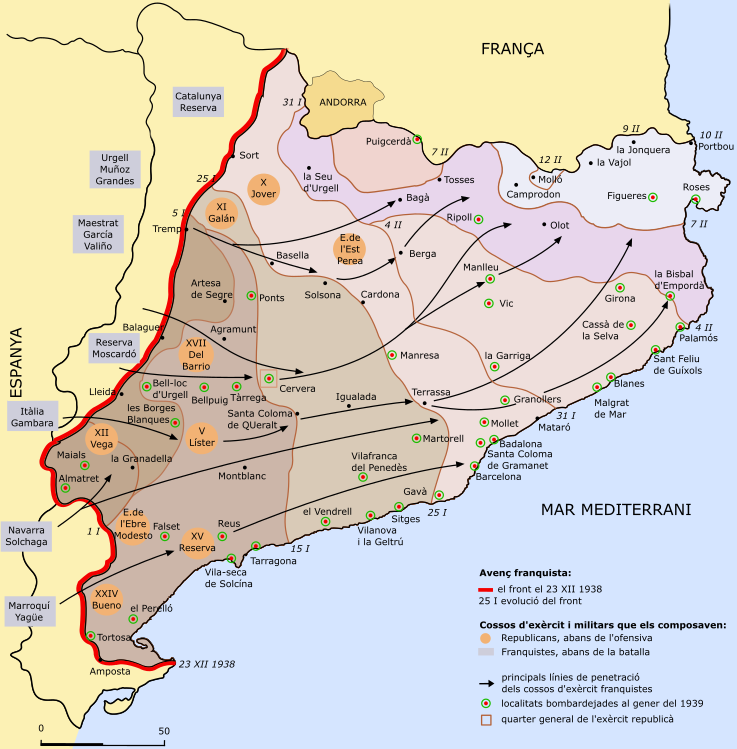
Francoist offensives during the occupation of Catalonia

The defeat of the initial military rebellion against the Republican government in Barcelona by forces of the Generalitat and workers' militias placed Catalonia firmly in the Republican camp. The loyalist victory allowed to the workers' self-armed militias, predominantly anarchists, to become the real power of the streets, which meant the beginning of a harsh repression in Catalonia against those elements of being "fascist" or right-wing sympathizers. Both the Generalitat and the central government were unable to stop the arbitrary revolutionary violence. During the war, there were two powers coexisting in Catalonia: the de jure power of the Generalitat and the de facto power of the armed popular militias. In order to begin the recovering of some control of the situation, Companys authorized on July 21 the establishment of a joint body by the different Catalan republican parties and the anarchist CNT and socialist UGT trade unions, The Central Committee of Antifascist Militias of Catalonia (CCMA), becoming the effective Catalan government until its dissolution, two months later, replaced by a new government of the Generalitat which included anarchist ministers. Throughout Catalonia many sectors of the economy fell under the control of the CNT and the UGT, where workers' self-management was implemented. These included any kind of industry and services and thousands of dwellings previously owned by the upper classes. Initially, the newly collectivized factories encountered various problems. In response to these problems, the Generalitat, backed by the CNT approved a decree on "Collectivization and Workers' Control" on 24 October 1936. Under this decree all firms with more than 100 workers were to be collectivized and those with 100 or less could be collectivized if a majority of workers agreed. Violent confrontations between the workers' parties culminated in the defeat of the CNT-FAI and POUM in the 1937 May Days, against whom the PSUC unleashed strong repression. The local situation resolved itself progressively in favor of the Generalitat, but at the same time the Generalitat partially lost its autonomous power within republican Spain.

The military forces of the Generalitat, weakly structured between December 1936 and May 1937 in the People's Army of Catalonia (Exèrcit Popular de Catalunya), were concentrated on two fronts: Aragon and Majorca. The latter was an utter disaster. The Aragon front resisted firmly until 1938, when the occupation of Lleida and Balaguer destabilized it. Finally, Franco's troops broke the republican territory in two by occupying the Valencian coastal town of Vinaròs, isolating Catalonia from the rest of Republican Spain. The defeat of the Republican army in the Battle of the Ebro led in 1938 and 1939 to the occupation of Catalonia by Franco's forces, who abolished completely the Catalan self-government and brought in a dictatorial regime, which took strong measures against Catalan nationalism and culture. Only forty years later, after Franco's death (1975) and the adoption of a democratic constitution in Spain (1978), did Catalonia recover its autonomy and reconstitute the Generalitat (1977).

George Orwell served with the POUM in Catalonia from December 1936 until June 1937. His memoir of that time, Homage to Catalonia, was first published in 1938 and foreshadowed the causes of Second World War. It remains one of the most widely read books on the Spanish Civil War.

== Contemporary period (1939–present) ==
=== Franco's dictatorship ===
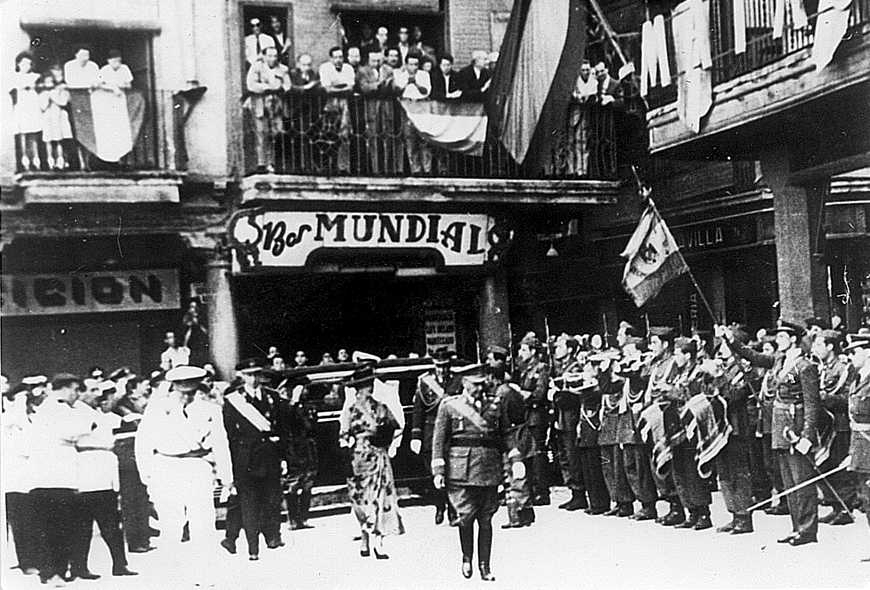
Francisco Franco in Reus, 1940

As in the rest of Spain, the Franco era (1939–1975) in Catalonia saw the annulment of democratic liberties, the prohibition and persecution of parties, the rise of thoroughgoing censorship, and the banning of all leftist institutions. In Catalonia it also meant, yet again, the annulment of the Statute of Autonomy, the banning of the whole specifically Catalan institutions and legislation. Catalan was subject to oppression and was reduced to family use. Castilian (Spanish) became the only language of education, administration and the media. During the first years, all resistance was energetically suppressed, the prisons filled up with political prisoners, and thousands of Catalans went into exile. In addition, 4000 Catalans were executed between 1938 and 1953, among them the former president of the Generalitat Lluís Companys (taken to Spain from his exile in the German-occupied France).

The Civil War had ravaged the Spanish economy. Infrastructure had been damaged, workers killed and daily business severely hampered. The economic recovery was very slow and it was not until the second half of the 1950s that the economy of Catalonia reached the prewar levels of 1936. After an initial period in which Spain tried to build an autarky, in which the economy improved little, Franco's regime changed its economic policies in 1959 and in the 1960s and early 1970s the economy entered a period of rapid economic expansion that became known as the Spanish Miracle. International firms established their factories in Spain: salaries were relatively low, strikes were forbidden, labour health or real state regulations were unheard of and Spain was virtually a virgin market. The period was marked by agricultural modernization, a massive expansion of industry and the start of mass tourism, which it was concentrated on the coast (Costa Brava in Girona and Costa Daurada in Tarragona). As industry in Catalonia expanded, workers migrated from rural areas across Spain (particularly Andalusia, Extremadura, Murcia and Galicia), to work in Barcelona and its surrounding area, turning it into one of Europe's largest industrial metropolitan areas, which in turn led to dramatic urbanisation. Working-class opposition to Franco began to appear, usually clandestinely, and most notably in the form of the Comisiones Obreras ("Workers Commissions"), a return of trade union organizing, and the revival of the PSUC, while the students' protests turned frequent. In the 1970s democratic forces united under the banner of the Assembly of Catalonia ("Assemblea de Catalunya"), demanding political and social freedom, amnesty for the political prisoners, the reestablishment of the autonomy of Catalonia and the collaboration with the democratic forces of the rest of Spain.

During later stages of Francoist Spain, folkloric and religious celebrations in Catalan resumed and were tolerated. Use of Catalan in the mass media had been forbidden, but was permitted from the early 1950s in the theatre. During the 60s and 70s the Catalan music entered into a period of renewal and growth known as Nova Cançó. Initially appeared with Els Setze Jutges group, it quickly became a mass phenomenon that incorporated the protest song against the Dictatorship and helped bring forth prominent singers and groups such as Joan Manuel Serrat, Lluís Llach, Raimon, Maria del Mar Bonet, Ovidi Montllor or Grup de Folk.

=== Democracy restored ===
Emblem of the Generalitat (Government) of Catalonia

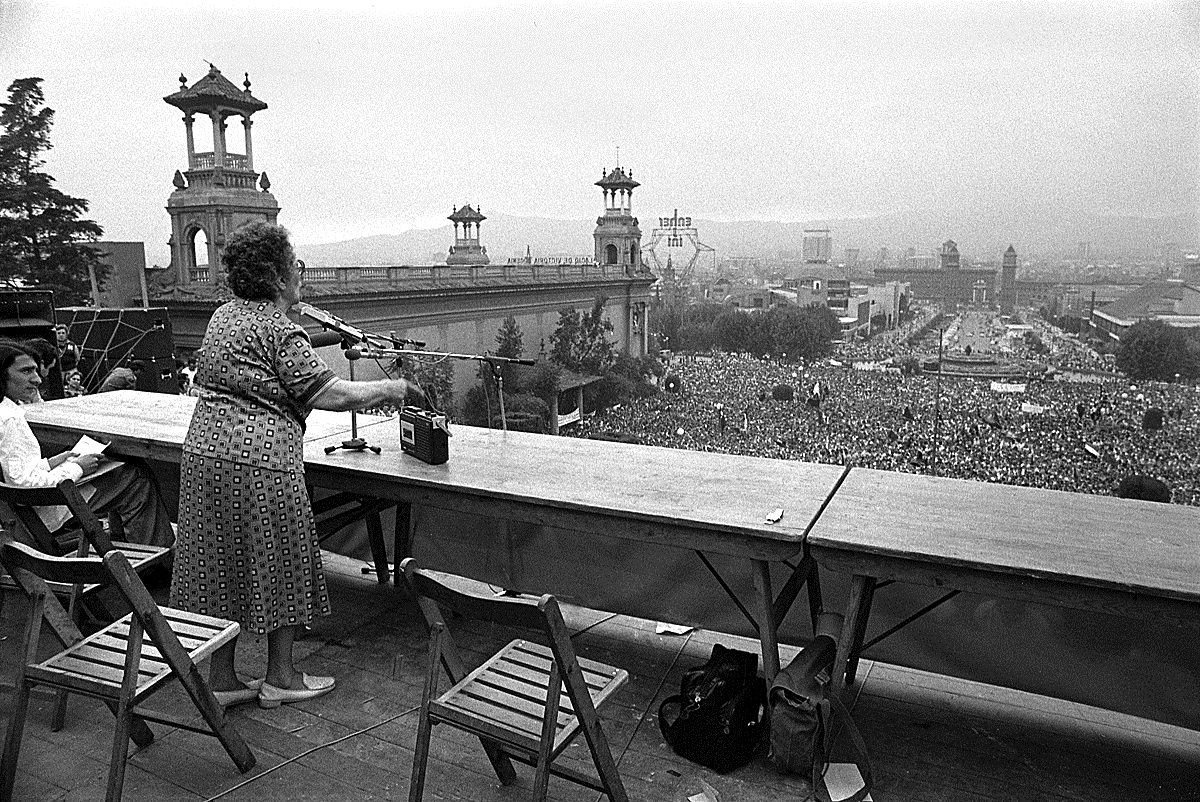
Federica Montseny speaks at the meeting of the CNT in Barcelona in 1977 after 36 years of exile

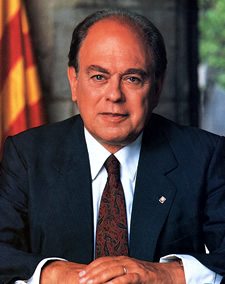
Jordi Pujol, one hundred twenty-sixth president of the Generalitat of Catalonia (1980–2003)

Franco's death initiated a period that came to be known as the "democratic transition", during which democratic liberties were restored, culminating in the Spanish Constitution of 1978. This constitution recognized the existence of multiple national communities within Spain and proposed the division of the country into autonomous communities. After the first general election in 1977 the Generalitat was restored as a provisional government, headed by its president in exile Josep Tarradellas, and including representatives of the various leading forces of the time. In 1979, the new Statute of Autonomy was finally approved delegating more autonomy in matters of education and culture than the Republican 1932 Statute, but less in terms of the systems of justice and public order. In it, Catalonia is defined as a "nationality", Catalan is recognized as Catalonia's own language, and became co-official with Spanish. First election to the Parliament of Catalonia under this Statute gave the Catalan presidency to Jordi Pujol, a position he would hold until 2003. During this time he also led Convergència i Unió (Convergence and Unity, CiU) a center-right Catalan nationalist electoral coalition consisting of his own Convergència Democràtica de Catalunya (Democratic Convergence of Catalonia, CDC) and the smaller and more conservative Unió Democràtica de Catalunya (Democratic Union of Catalonia, UDC).

Throughout the 1980s and 1990s, the institutions of Catalan autonomy continued to develop, among them an autonomous police force (called Mossos d'Esquadra, officially refunded as the police of Catalonia in 1983), the restoration of the comarcal administrations (roughly equivalent to United States "counties" or United Kingdom "shires" or "counties", but distinct from the historical Catalan counties) and a High Court in the form of the High Court of Justice of Catalonia (Catalan: Tribunal Superior de Justícia de Catalunya). Catalonia's Law of Linguistic Normalization promoted Catalan-language media. The broadcasting network Televisió de Catalunya and its first channel TV3, which broadcast mainly in Catalan, were created in 1983. The Catalan government also provides subsidies to various means of promoting Catalan culture, including for example the making of Catalan-language films or the subtitling of foreign-language films in Catalan.

In 1992, Barcelona hosted the Summer Olympics, which brought international attention to Catalonia. During the 1990s, the absence of absolute majorities in the Spanish parliament made governments reliant on support from the various nationalist parties (Catalan, Basque, Canary Islands, etc.) which was leveraged by CiU, to broaden the scope of Catalan autonomy during the last government of Felipe González (1993–1996) and the first of José María Aznar (1996–2000).

In November 2003, elections to the Generalitat gave the plurality, but not the majority of seats to CiU. Three other parties (Socialists' Party of Catalonia–Spanish Socialist Workers' Party, PSC-PSOE, Republican Left of Catalonia (ERC) and Initiative for Catalonia Greens (ICV)) united to take the government into a left-wing nationalist coalition, making Pasqual Maragall, (PSC-PSOE) the new president of Catalonia. This government proved unstable, especially on the issue of reforming the Statute of Autonomy of Catalonia. The Statute was approved by the Parliament of Catalonia on 30 September 2005, and subsequently it was sent to the Cortes Generales for review and discussion. They approved the law on 10 May 2006, on 18 June Catalan citizens ratified the Statute, and have been in force since 9 August 2006. The new Statute of Autonomy consolidated the self-government, and included the definition of Catalonia as a nation in the preamble. The internal tensions of Catalan Government provoked new elections, held in autumn 2006. The result was again a plurality, but not a majority, for CiU, and PSC-PSOE, ERC and ICV again formed a coalition, with José Montilla (PSC-PSOE) as president.

On 16 September 2005, the ICANN officially approved the domain.cat, the first domain for a language community.

=== Independence process ===
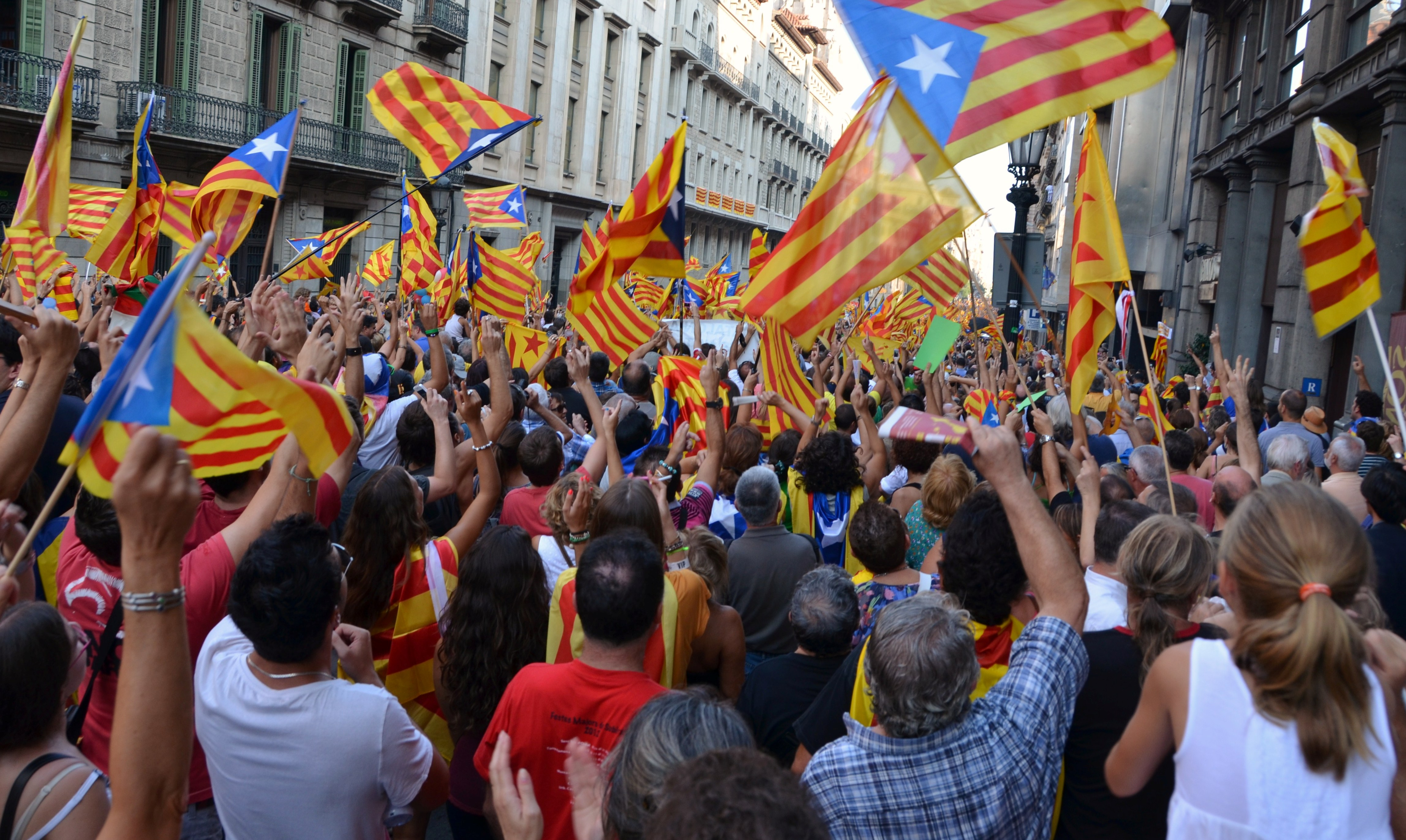
The 2012 Catalan independence demonstration

The new Statute of Autonomy of Catalonia, approved by referendum, was contested by important sectors of the Spanish nationalism and the conservative People's Party, sending the law to the partisan Constitutional Court of Spain which, in 2010, ruled that various key articles were nonvalid, particularly those estalishing a descentralized Justice system, improvements of financing, the historical rights as basis of self-government, the reinforced status of Catalan language or the references of Catalonia as a nation. As a response, on 10 July 2010, a successful demonstration was held, and the civil society started a process of organization in order to exert the right of self-determination. While the economic crisis affected profoundly Spain, CiU win the Catalan election of 2010, promising a fiscal agreement similar to the Basque. Its leader, Artur Mas, was appointed as president. Initially supported by the PP, his government carried out a program of austerity. During the National Day of Catalonia, on 11 September 2012, a massive demonstration in the streets of Barcelona organized by the organization Catalan National Assembly (Assemblea Nacional Catalana, ANC) claimed for independence and a referendum of self-determination.

On 23 January 2013, parliament approved a Declaration on the Sovereignty and right to decide of the people of Catalonia asserting that Catalonia is a sovereign entity and calls for a referendum on independence. After the impediments of Spanish institutions, on 9 November 2014 the Government of Catalonia organized the independence referendum, in which allegedly 1.6 million out of potential 5.4 million voters or 80.8% of the 2.25 million cast votes supported the independence option (as per unofficial records).

On 9 November 2015, parliament approved a Declaration to start the independence process of Catalonia asserting the start of the process to create an independent Catalan state in the form of a republic.

=== 2017 Independence referendum ===
Catalan Republic República Catalana
- Flag Seal
- Anthem: Els Segadors (The Reapers)
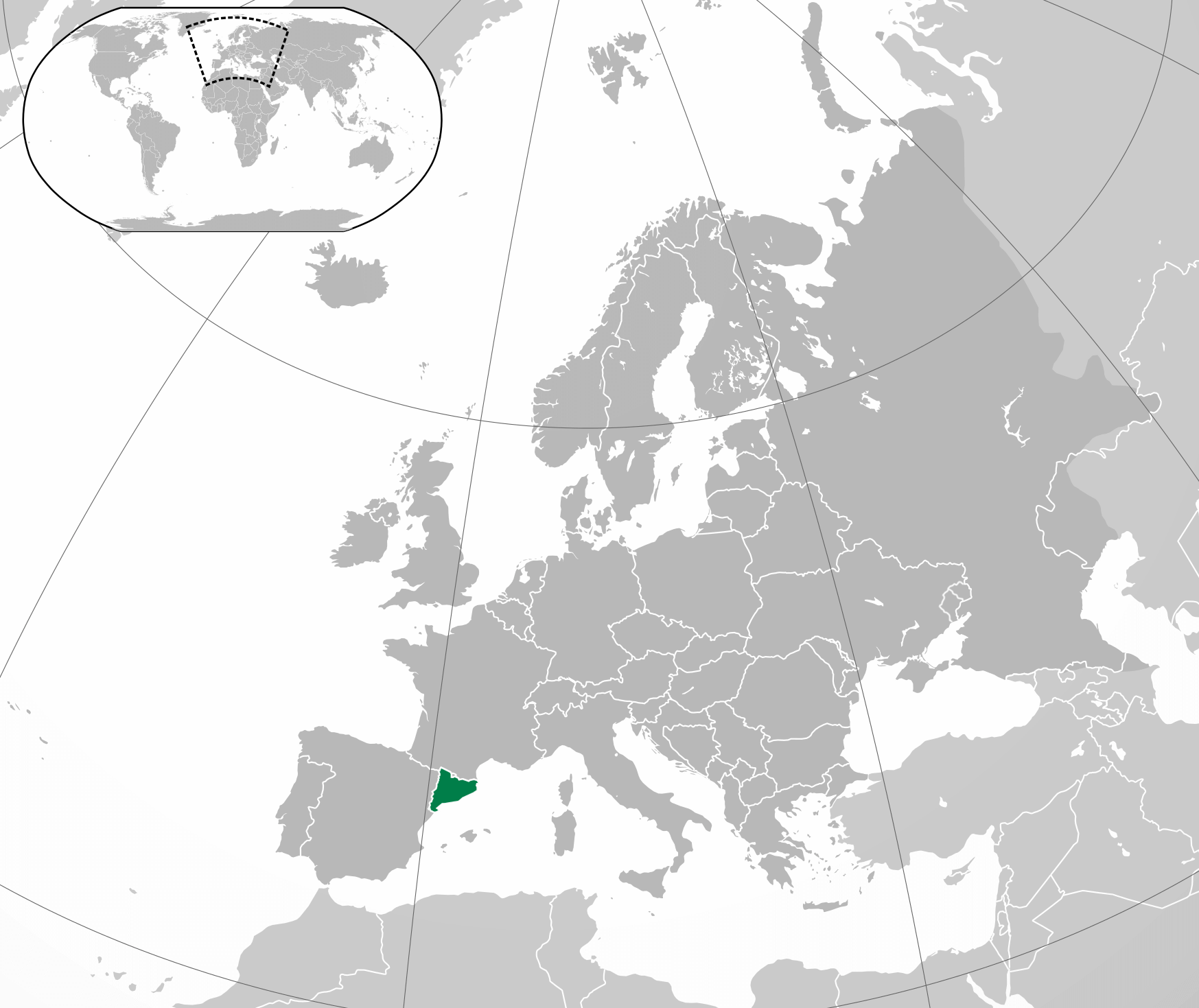
- Location of the Catalan Republic within Europe.
- Status: Unrecognized state
- Largest city: Barcelona
- Official languages: Catalan, Occitan, Spanish

Government
  - President: Carles Puigdemont
  - Vice President: Oriol Junqueras
- Legislature: Parliament

Unrecognised State
  - Independence referendum: 1 October 2017
  - Proclaimed independence: 27 October 2017
  - Independence suspended: 27 October 2017

Population
  - 2016 census: 7.523 million
Preceded by	Succeeded by
Spain	Spain

A controversial independence referendum was held in Catalonia on 1 October 2017, using a disputed voting process. It was declared illegal on 6 September 2017 and suspended by the Constitutional Court of Spain because it breached the Spanish Constitution. Subsequently, the European Commission agreed that the referendum was illegal. The referendum asked the question: "Do you want Catalonia to become an independent state in the form of a republic?". More than 2,020,000 voters (91.96%) answered "Yes" and around 177,000 answered "No", on a turnout of 43.03%. The Catalan government estimated that up to 770,000 votes were not cast due to polling stations being closed off during the police crackdown, although the "universal census" system introduced earlier in the day allowed electors to vote in any given polling station. Catalan government officials have argued that the turnout would be higher were it not for Spanish police suppression of the vote of the illegal referendum, and that were it not for closures and police successful intervention to siege the illegal votes. Up to 770,000 votes were lost as a result of the crackdowns at police stations, the Catalan government estimated, and that were it not for closures and police pressure and disproportionate violence (it is estimated that around 1,000 people were injured during that day), turnout could have been as high as 55%. On the other hand, many voters who did not support Catalan independence did not turn out.

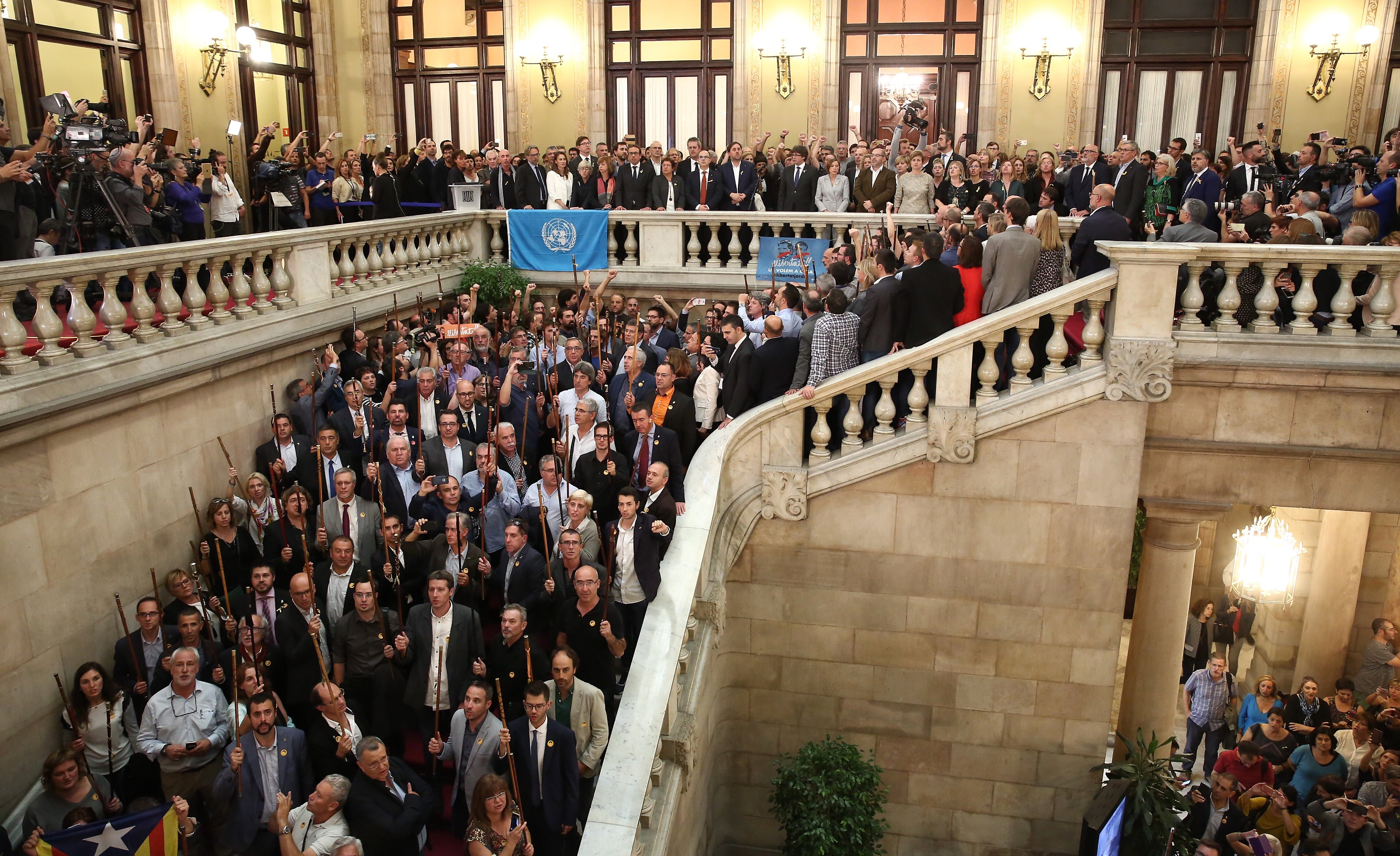
Presidents Puigdemont and Forcadell after the Catalan parliament approved the independence

Catalonia declared independence. The independence motion was passed on 27 October 2017 in the Catalan assembly. The results of the parties remaining were with 70 votes in favour, 10 against and two blank ballots. Just hours after the Catalan declaration of independence, the Spanish Senate invoked Article 155 of the Spanish Constitution and authorised Spanish Prime Minister Mariano Rajoy's government to impose direct rule over Catalonia. Rajoy declared the dissolution of the Catalan Parliament and dismissed Catalonia's Government, including its president, Carles Puigdemont. Rajoy called a snap Catalan parliamentary election for 21 December 2017.

Spanish Deputy Prime Minister Soraya Saenz de Santamaria was chosen to assume the functions of the President of Catalonia, as part of the actions that resulted after the activation of Article 155. Santamaria was vested total control over the Catalan administration in addition to being appointed president. Josep Lluís Trapero was also relieved of his duty as chief of the Catalan police force.

On 1 May 2018 Quim Torra was elected President of Catalonia after the Spanish courts blocked the election of Carles Puigdemont, who had the support of the Catalan Parliament after the December election; Jordi Turull, and Jordi Sànchez. Carles Puigdemont was declared non-legible after fleeing the Spanish judiciary system. Jordi Sànchez was declared non-ilegible since he was in jail awaiting trial and Jordi Turull was summoned to court and kept in jail half-way through the investiture debate.

On 1 June 2018 a motion of no confidence in the Spanish government was successful, and resulted in the downfall of Mariano Rajoy and in socialist leader Pedro Sánchez becoming new prime minister of Spain. Catalan nationalist parties were a key support to the downfall of Rajoy.

== See also ==
- Timeline of Catalan history
- History of Andorra
- History of Barcelona
- Count of Barcelona
- List of presidents of the Government of Catalonia
- Military history of Catalonia
- History of political Catalanism
