= Assembly of Catalonia =

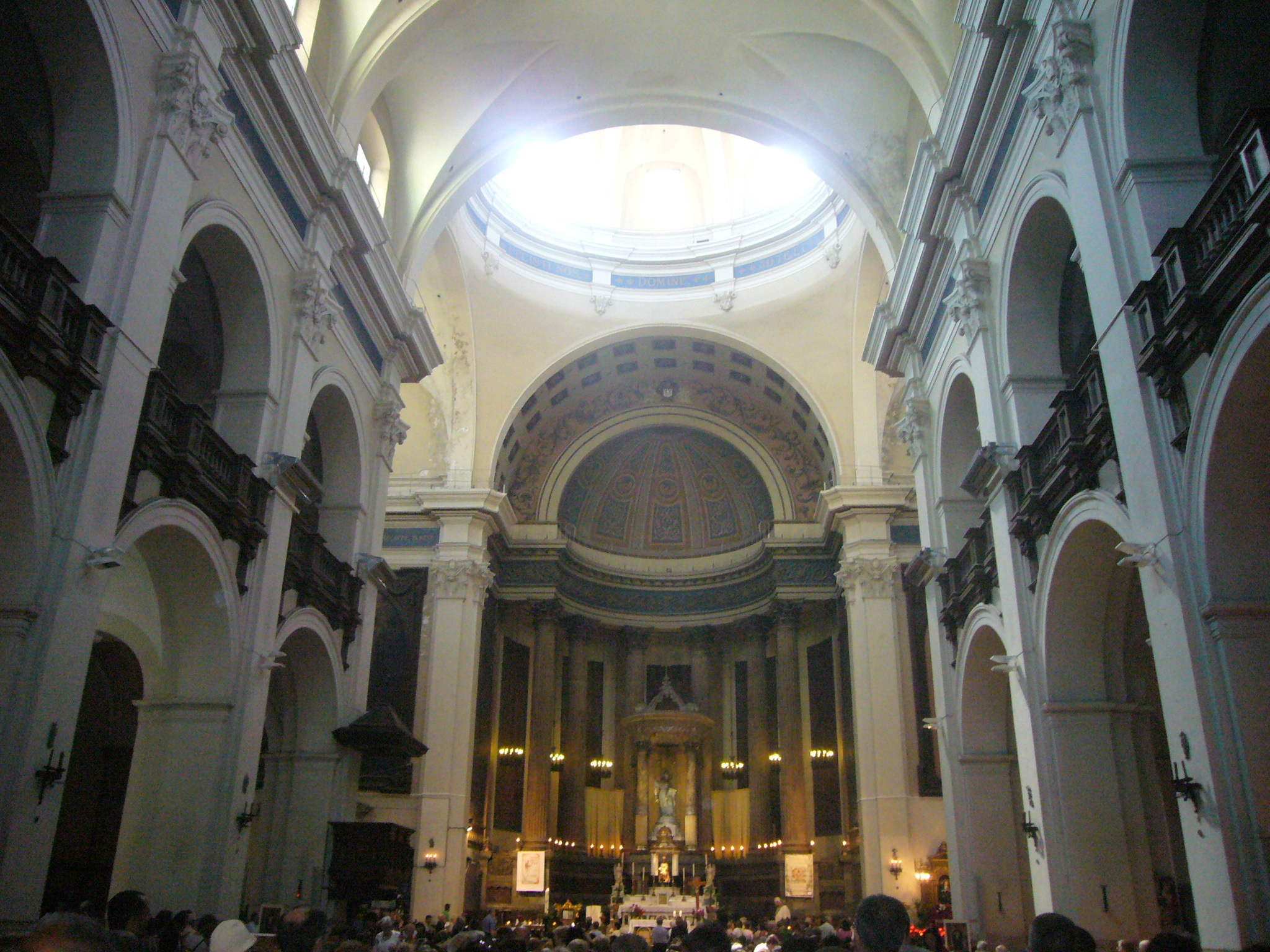
Interior of the Sant Agustí church of El Raval neighborhood in Barcelona, where the Assembly of Catalonia was constituted on 7 November 1971

The Assembly of Catalonia (Catalan: Assemblea de Catalunya, Spanish: Asamblea de Cataluña) was a unitary body of the anti-Francoist opposition of Catalonia created in November 1971. Its fundamental demands were the demand for democratic freedoms, the general amnesty for political prisoners and the achievement of the statute of autonomy, which were synthesized in the motto of Freedom, Amnesty, Statute of Autonomy. In addition to the political parties—all of them clandestine—forces of various kinds were part of it, such as trade union organizations, professional groups, representatives of the university movement, neighborhood movements, Christian groups, regional assemblies, etc. The objectives of the Assembly were achieved during the democratic transition, especially when the Cortes approved the Statute of Autonomy of Catalonia in 1979.

== Background ==
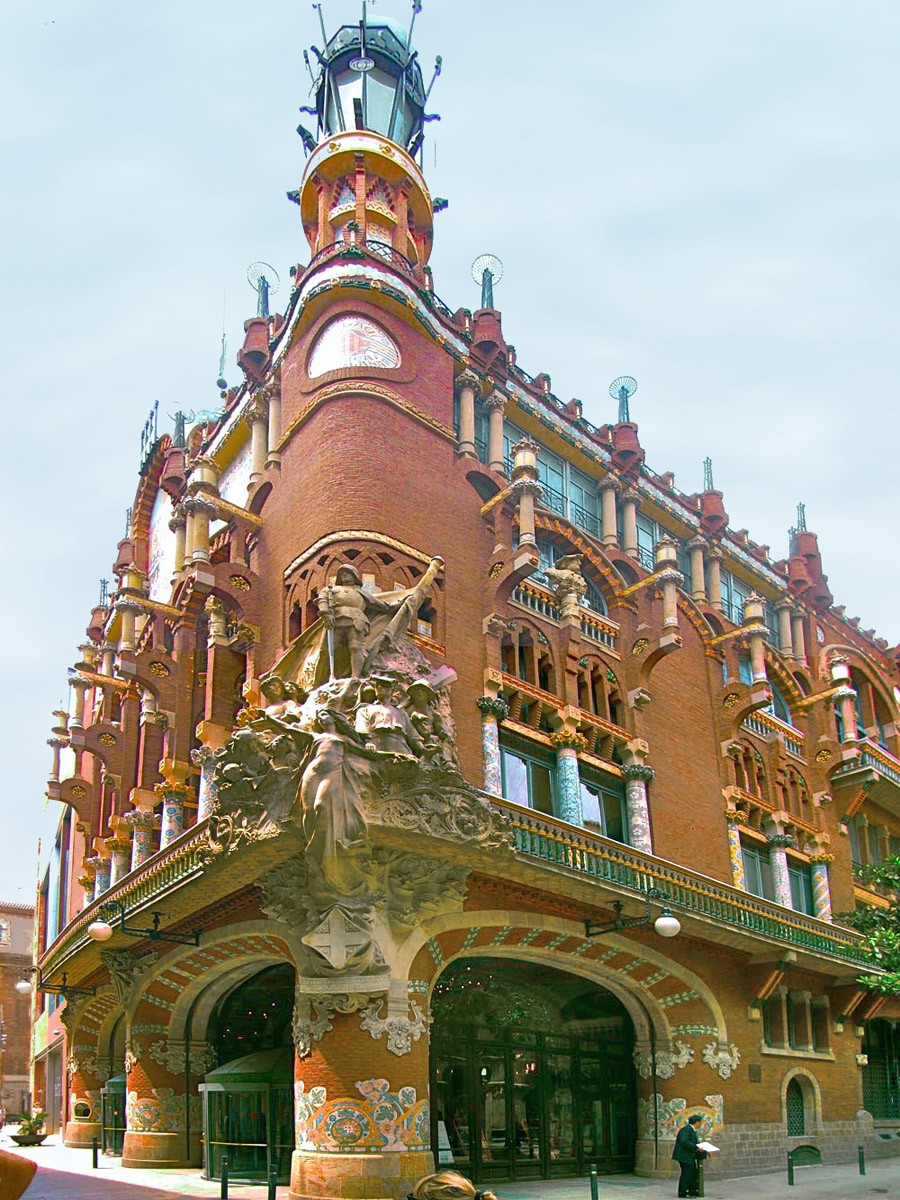
Palau de la Música Catalana where the events of the Palau de la Música of 1960 took place, and where the Statute of Catalonia of 1919 had been signed 41 years before.

Having managed to survive the harsh repression of the first two decades of the dictatorship, the anti-Francoist opposition resurfaced in 1960. The founding act of the Catalan nationalist resistance is usually considered as the events at the Palau de la Música in Barcelona in May 1960, during which the public attending an event held at the Palau de la Música Catalana presided over by several Franco ministers sang the Cant de la Senyera, which functioned as an alternative anthem to the banned Els Segadors. Jordi Pujol, who was also accused of being the author of the pamphlet Us presentem al general Franco (We present ourselves to general Franco), was arrested, tried and sentenced by a military court to seven years in prison.

In those years the most established opposition party was the Unified Socialist Party of Catalonia (PSUC) and the first important political event was La Caputxinada in 1966, named after the Sarrià Caputxins that the police surrounded to proceed to arrest the promoters of the illegal Democratic Union of Students of the University of Barcelona who were gathered there together with a group of intellectuals, who among other things claimed the duty of universities to "welcome national languages and cultures and take responsibility for their development and consolidation".

== Creation ==
As a consequence of the actions undertaken to achieve the freedom of those detained in La Caputxinada, the Taula Rodona was founded, an organization that brought together the entire anti-Francoist opposition and of which the PSUC was also a part, for the first time since the end of the Civil War. This organization was a precedent to the Coordination of Political Forces of Catalonia (Catalan: Coordinadora de Forces Polítiques de Catalunya), founded in 1969 and constituted by the National Front of Catalonia, the Socialist Movement of Catalonia, the Democratic Union of Catalonia and the PSUC. In its founding manifesto, the Coordination demanded amnesty and political and union freedoms, as well as the reestablishment of the Statute of Autonomy of 1932 and the convocation of a constituent Cortes, as a prior step to the recognition of the right of self-determination that was to be extended to all the peoples of the Spanish state. With the founding of this unitary body of the entire opposition and the presentation of a joint program "Catalan anti-Francoism [was] at the head of the Spanish opposition".

As a means of protest against the Burgos military tribunals, the Coordination organized in December 1970 an Assembly of Intellectuals held in the Monastery of Montserrat, that led to the formation in November of the following year of the Assembly of Catalonia. In addition to the Coordination's parties, the Socialist Party of National Liberation- a split from the National Front of Catalonia -, the PSOE, the Workers' Commissions and UGT trade unions, as well as various professional and social groups, as well as legal entities and independent people, were integrated into it.

== Objectives and actions ==
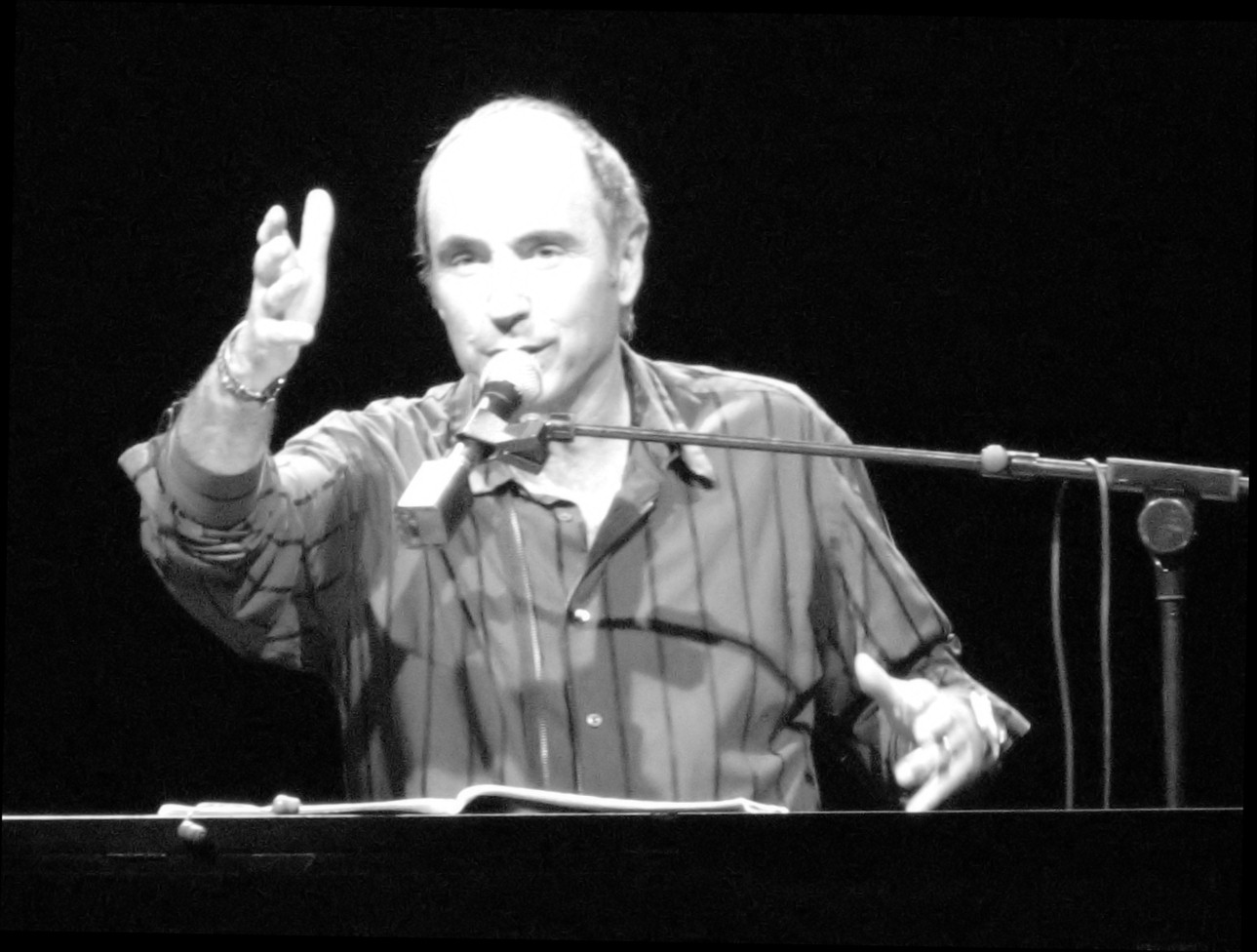
Lluís Llach, one of the main representatives of the Nova Cançó, in a performance in Olympia music hall in Paris, 2006. His 1968 song L'Estaca became an hymn of the anti-Francoist opposition

The Assembly's program was summarized in the slogan "Freedom, Amnesty, Statute of Autonomy" that achieved great popularity - its first campaign "Per què l'Estatut of 1932?", initiated in May 1972, achieved notable success - extending its influence throughout the Catalan territory, despite the fact that its permanent commission was arrested by the police in 1973 (113 people) and on 8 September 1974 (67 people). "Its greatest success was taking the democratic and nationalist demand from the ghetto of the parties to the streets, confirming its social implementation. The Assembly reversed the situation: until then the clandestine groups had to evade repression, with it the problem was with the Government, which had to combat an illegal and provocative platform on the streets, which attracted a growing number of citizens". And on the other hand "it condemned to immediate failure, lack of any kind of social support, the attempts to establish armed struggle groups in the image of ETA such as the Catalan Liberation Front (FAC), the Organization of Armed Struggle (OLLA) or the Catalan People's Army (EPOCA)".

An important moment in the history of the Assembly was the "Caiguda dels 113" ("Fall of the 113"). On 28 October 1973 the Francoist police arrested 113 people in the Parish of Santa Maria Mitjancera in Barcelona. The arrested were representatives of political parties and clandestine unions but also of professional and neighborhood associations. A large citizen mobilization in support of the detainees immediately began in Catalonia and a solidarity campaign was launched that had international resonance.

After the death of Franco in November 1975, the Assembly of Catalonia increased its campaign in favor of "Freedom, Amnesty and Statute of Autonomy", which resulted in the two demonstrations held in Barcelona on 1 and 8 February 1976, that were harshly repressed by the police. Taking advantage of the greater margin of freedom granted by the new government of Adolfo Suárez formed in July, the Marxa de la Libertat was organized throughout the summer of that year promoted by the Lluís Maria Xirinacs — who would be elected senator in the first democratic elections June 1977— who toured not only Catalonia but also Valencia and the Balearic Islands with the motto "Poble català, posa't a caminar" ("Catalan people, start walking") and which was sometimes repressed by the police. However, the leading role in the fight for freedoms passed to the political parties that in December 1975 had formed the Council of Political Forces of Catalonia, successor to the Coordination. It was this organization that negotiated with the Suárez government the free commemoration of the first September 11th (National Day of Catalonia) since the end of the civil war. The permission was granted at the last moment and more than 100,000 people gathered in the main demonstration in Sant Boi de Llobregat, while the demonstrations called in other towns were brutally repressed by the police.

== Dissolution ==
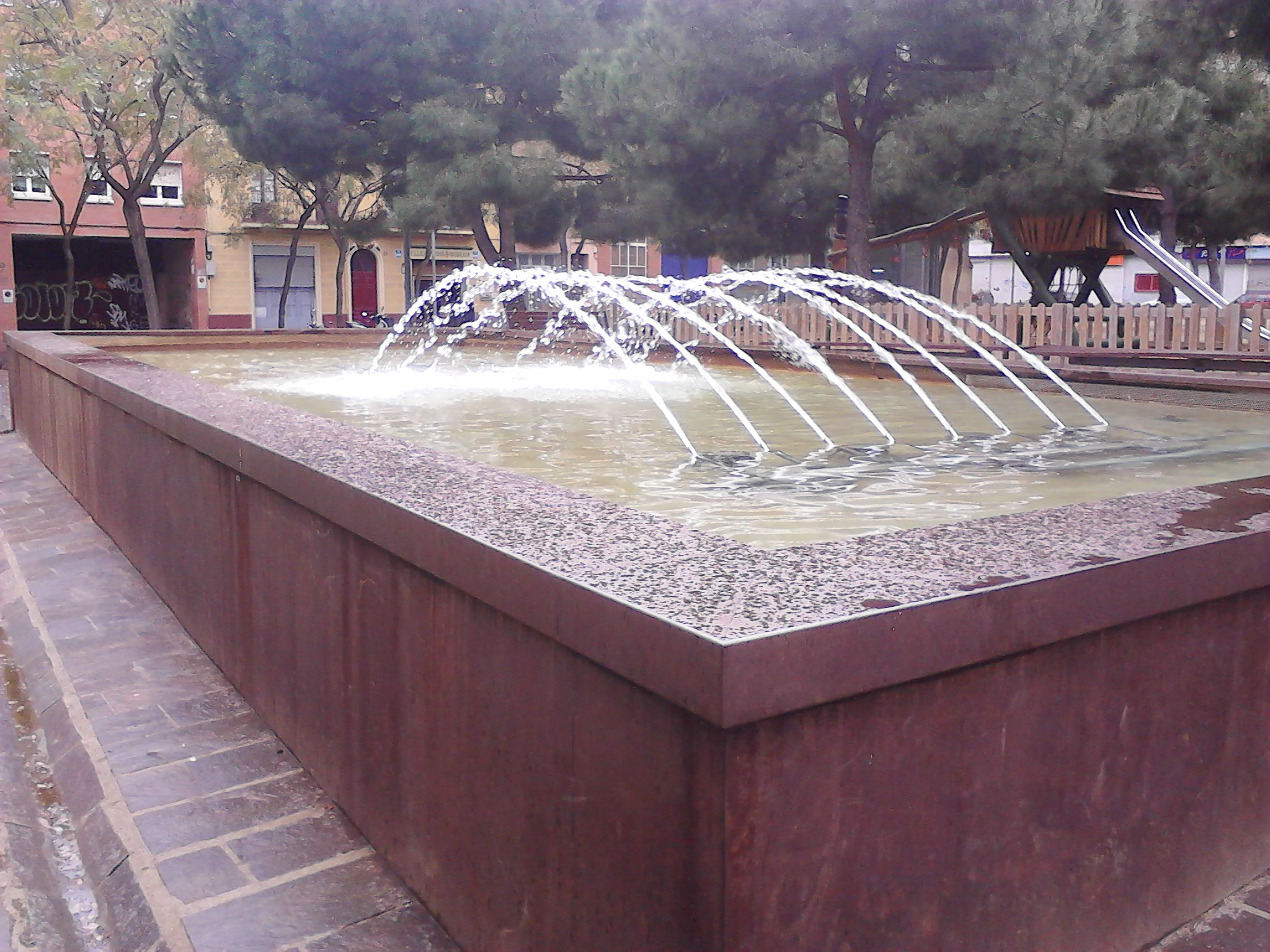
Fountain of the Assembly of Catalonia in the square of the same name in the La Sagrera neighborhood of Barcelona. Work of the architect Olga Tarrassó. The square received this name in 1982 because it was located near the parish of Cristo Rey where in 1971 the first attempt to establish the Assembly of Catalonia was made

The Assembly of Catalonia was dissolved after the general elections of June 1977, which in Catalonia produced a large majority for the left-wing parties, whereas in the rest of Spain the Union of the Democratic Center obtained the most votes.

Ten days after the elections were held, the Assemblea de Parliamentaris was formed, which brought together all the Catalan deputies and senators and demanded the restoration of the Statute of Autonomy of Catalonia of 1932.
