= Events of the Palau de la Música =

Events at the Palau de la Música Catalana

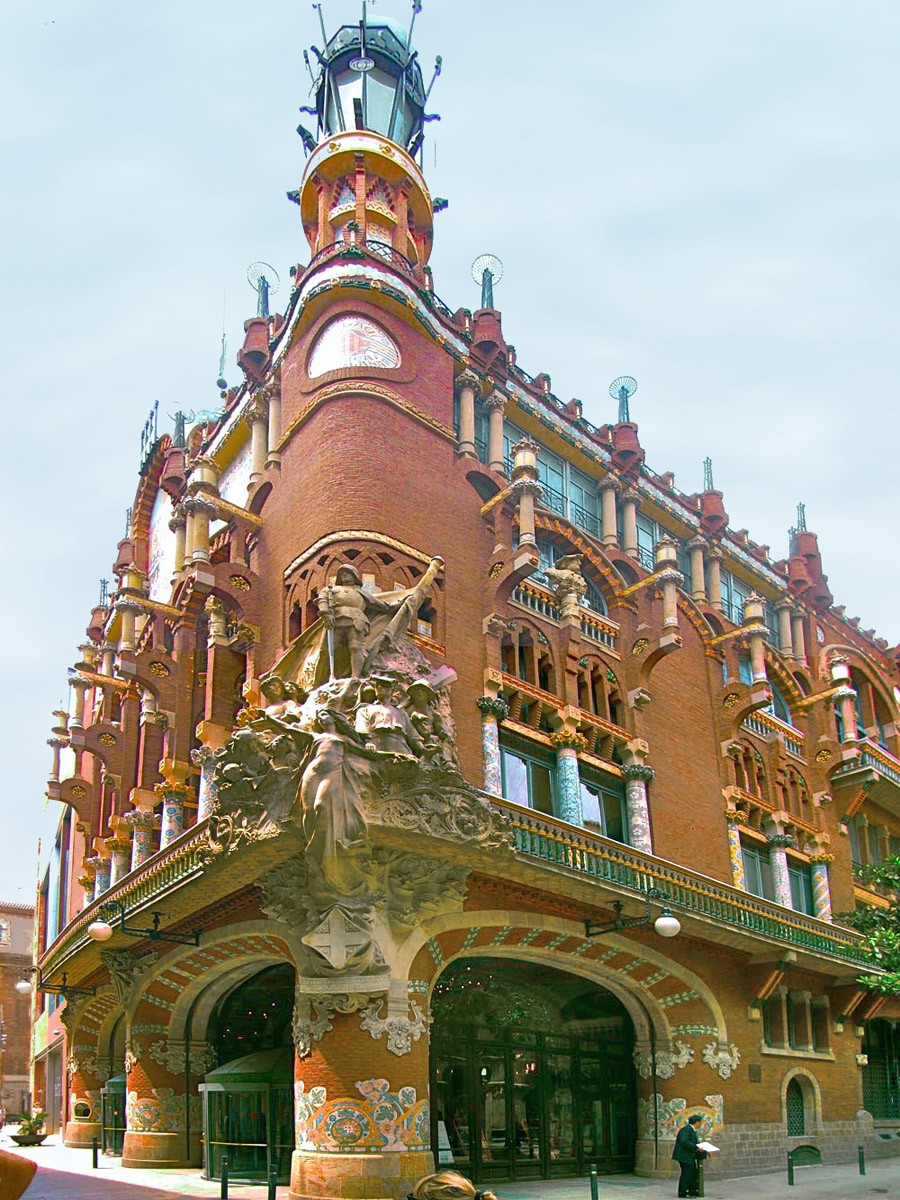
Palau de la Música Catalana, where the events took place in 1960, 51 years after the first draft of a Home Rule bill was approved in the same venue by the Mancomunitat de Catalunya.

The events of the Palau de la Música took place in the Palau de la Música Catalana in Barcelona on 19 May 1960 during a celebration to commemorate the 100th anniversary of the Catalan poet Joan Maragall. It was organised by the Orfeó Català and several ministers from the dictatorship attended.

These events are considered to mark the revitalization of Catalan activism after the Spanish Civil War and the beginning of the political career of Jordi Pujol, who would eventually become President of the Generalitat de Catalunya.

The importance of these events go far beyond from music, particularly because of the remarkable reaction of the public after the government banned the Cant de la Senyera from being sung at the event. The choir didn't sing El Cant de la Senyera, but the audience did. Jordi Pujol was among those arrested following the events. Even though he was not in the venue, he helped organise the protest and was found guilty by a military court and sent to prison.

== Historical background and events ==
Franco's dictatorship always paid special attention to repressing any pro-Catalan expression, both of the Catalan language and the symbols of the country. However, after the regime's consolidation in the 50s the government planned some concessions sponsored by the mayor of Barcelona at the time, Josep Maria de Porcioles.

They announced the concession of a Chart that would allow the city a certain level of self-government, the cession of the castle of Montjuïc to the local council, a compellation of Catalan Civil Law, and the official celebration to mark the 100th anniversary of Catalan poet and writer Joan Maragall birthdate. Franco himself was to visit Catalonia earlier in May.

These gestures became evidently a farce as the governor of Barcelona, Felipe Acedo Colunga, banned the Cant de la Senyera from being sung. Joan Maragall was in fact the author of the actual poem and it had been initially scheduled at the end of the event, as it traditionally was by the Orfeó at the end of every concert.

Activists from an organisation called Catalan Christians organised a protest that was to take place on the same day as the concert to celebrate Joan Maragall, 19 May 1960.

This organisation was 6 hears old and had successfully contributed to the boycott of La Vanguardia in 1959.

As soon as the event started, a group of young people stood up and started singing the Cant de la Senyera while spreading a particular anti-Franco cartoon that had been created as a reaction to Franco's visit to the city, that had taken place a few days earlier. The text had been written by Jordi Pujol himself.

Several people were arrested and Jordi Pujol was sentenced to 7 years, although he only served three.

== Bibliography ==
- Balcells, Albert (1991). El nacionalismo catalán. Historia 16. ISBN 84-7679-196-8.
- Prieto Prieto, Jaime (1999). Història: Batxillerat. Brúixola. ISBN 84-8304-117-0.
