= Els Segadors =

National anthem of Catalonia, Spain

English: The Reapers
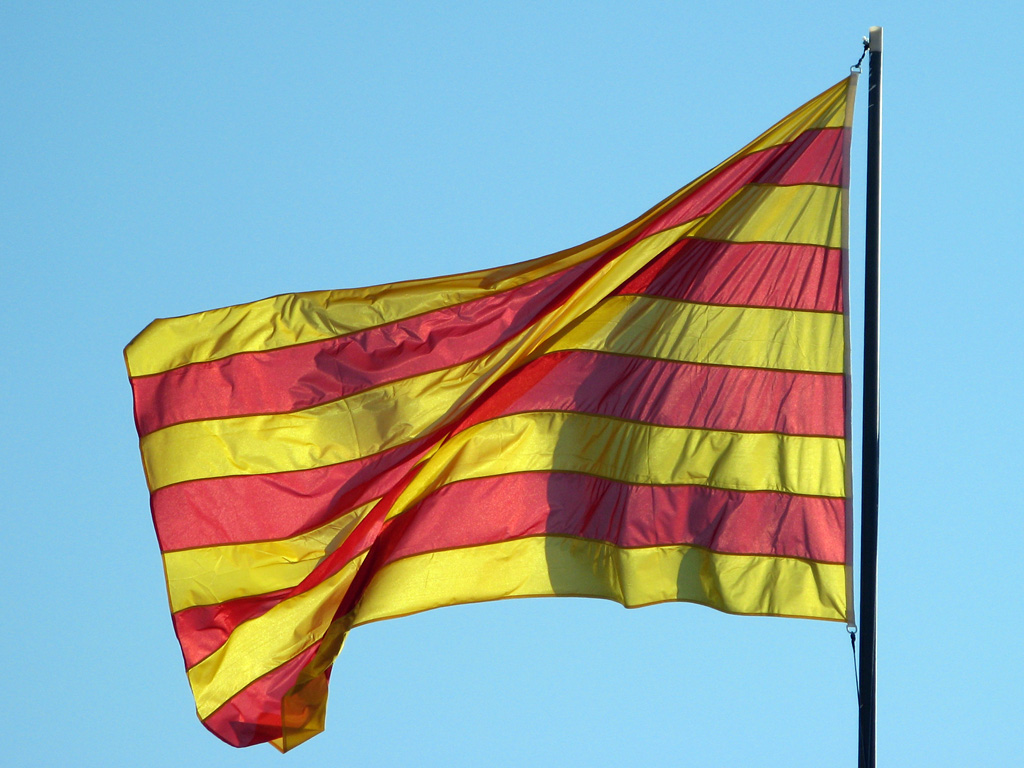
- National anthem of Catalonia
- Lyrics: Emili Guanyavents, 1899
- Music: Francesc Alió, 1892
- Adopted: 1899 (de facto); 25 February 1993 (de jure)

Audio sample
- Official orchestral and choral vocal recording: file; help

"Els Segadors" (Eastern Catalan: [əls səɣəˈðos], Western Catalan: [els seɣaˈðos]; "The Reapers") is the official national anthem of Catalonia, nationality and autonomous community of Spain.

== History ==
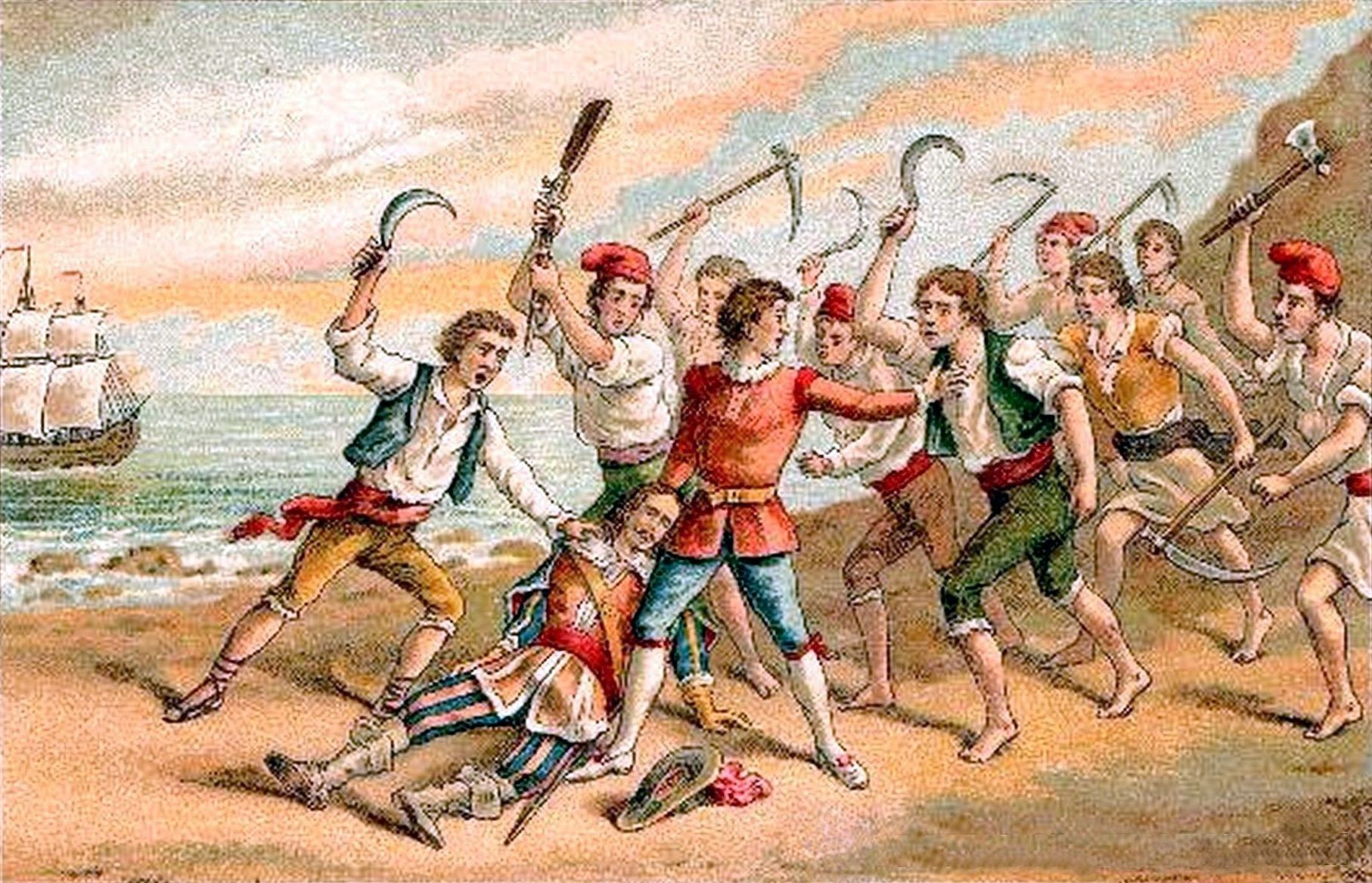
The Reapers' War "Corpus de Sang" (1640). Painted in 1910

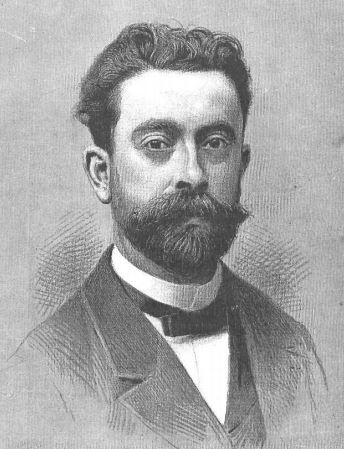
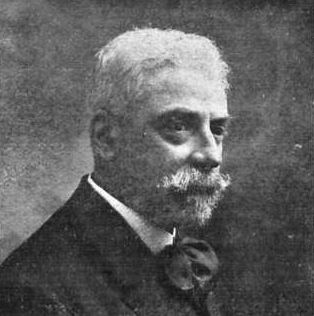
Left: Francesc Alió, composer of the music. Right: Emili Guanyavents, author of the modern lyrics

The original song dates in the oral tradition to 1640, based on the events of June 1640 known as Corpus de Sang ("Corpus of Blood") during the Thirty Years' War (1618–1648) between Spain, England, France and Austria, the event that started the Reapers' War or Guerra dels Segadors, also known as the Catalan Revolt or Catalan Revolution, where Catalans fought against the Count-Duke of Olivares, the chief minister of King Philip IV of Spain, and eventually led to an open war and the establishment of a Catalan Republic under French protection.

The song describes the events, an uprising of peasants due to the large and burdensome presence of the Spanish Royal army in the Principality of Catalonia, as they were required to lodge and provision the troops, thus leading to a large tension and discomfort and the outbreak of episodes such as religious sacrileges, destruction of personal properties, and rape of women by the soldiers. The second part of the song tells the arrival of the rebel reapers in Barcelona, who kill various guards, the royal officers and the viceroy of Catalonia, Dalmau de Queralt, ending with the exhortation to Catalans to take the arms, as they are at war.

In the 19th century, the text was compiled in the Romancillero Catalán, a book of folk traditions written by Manuel Milà i Fontanals. The music was standardized by Francesc Alió in 1892. Its modern lyrics were written by Emili Guanyavents, who won a competition convened by the political party Unió Catalanista in 1899, simplifying the text to three verses. At the time, the change of lyrics caused some controversy among conservative elements, as Guanyavents, coming from sectors close to anarchism, gave them a revolutionary tone.

Throughout the first quarter of the 20th century, "Els Segadors" became one of the most relevant symbols of Catalanism and Catalonia itself, consolidating its popularity during the Second Spanish Republic and the Civil War. Despite an early attempt of the Generalitat de Catalunya (Catalan autonomous government) in 1931 to replace it with another song, "El Cant del Poble", "Els Segadors" remained highly popular, assumed by both Catalan government and population as the de facto national anthem. The dictatorship of Francisco Franco (1939–1975) banned the public use of Catalan national symbolism as part of the broad anti-Catalanist policies, among them "Els Segadors". Tolerated songs, such as the "Virolai" or "La Santa Espina", were often played in its place to express Catalan identity, generally in folkloric contexts. The death of the dictator and the transition towards a democratic system allowed its public use again.

After decades being use de facto, often alongside the "Cant de la Senyera", the Catalan government officially adopted "Els Segadors" as the national anthem of Catalonia on 25 February 1993, by law of the Catalan parliament. The official version was recorded in 1994. The new Statute of Autonomy of Catalonia of 2006 confirms this decision by its article 8.4, in which is explicitly defined as a national symbol of Catalonia, alongside the National Day and the flag.

== Lyrics ==
=== Modern lyrics ===
Catalan original (official)

I
Catalunya triomfant,
tornarà a ser rica i plena.
Endarrera aquesta gent
tan ufana i tan superba.

Tornada:
Bon cop de falç!
Bon cop de falç, defensors de la terra!
Bon cop de falç!

II
Ara és hora, segadors.
Ara és hora d'estar alerta.
Per quan vingui un altre juny,
esmolem ben bé les eines.

Tornada

III
Que tremoli l'enemic,
en veient la nostra ensenya.
Com fem caure espigues d'or,
quan convé seguem cadenes.

Tornada

Central Catalan (Eastern) IPA (Note: See Help:IPA/Catalan and Catalan phonology.)

1
[kə.t̪ə.ˈɫu.ɲə tɾi.uɱ.ˈfän]
[t̪uɾ.nə.ˈrä‿(ə) se ˈri.kə‿i ˈpɫɛ.nə]
[ən̪.də.ˈre.ɾ‿ə.ˈkɛs.t̪ə ˈʒen]
[t̪än u.ˈfä.nə‿i t̪an su.ˈpɛɾ.β̞ə]

[t̪uɾ.ˈna.ð̞ə]
[bɔŋ‿kɔp də faɫs]
[bɔŋ‿kɔp də faɫs‿ð̞ə.fən.'soz‿ð̞ə ɫə ˈt̪ɛ.rə]
[bɔŋ‿kɔp də faɫs]

2
[ˈä.ɾ(ə)‿ez‿ˈɔ.ɾə sə.ɣ̞ə.ˈð̞os]
[ˈä.ɾ(ə)‿ez‿ˈɔ.ɾə ð̞əs.ˈt̪ä‿(ə).ˈɫɛɾ.t̪ə]
[pəɾ kwäm‿ˈbiŋ.ɡi‿un ˈäɫ̪.t̪ɾə ʒuɲ]
[əz.mu.ˈɫɛm‿bem‿be ɫəz‿ˈɛi̯.nəs]

[t̪uɾ.ˈna.ð̞ə]

3
[kə t̪ɾə.ˈmɔ.ɫi ɫə.nə.ˈmik]
[əm‿bə.ˈjen ɫə ˈnɔs.t̪ɾə‿n.ˈsɛ.ɲə]
[kɔɱ‿fem ˈkäw.ɾə‿s.ˈpi.ɣ̞əz‿ð̞ɔr]
[kwäŋ‿kum.ˈbe sə.ˈɣ̞ɛm kə.ˈð̞ɛ.nəs]

[tuɾ.ˈna.ð̞ə]

North-Western Catalan (Western) IPA

1
[ka.t̪a.ˈɫu.ɲa tɾi.uɱ.ˈfän]
[t̪oɾ.na.ˈrä‿(a) se ˈri.ka‿i ˈpɫe.na, -ne]
[ɛn̪.da.ˈre.ɾ‿a.ˈkes.t̪a ˈʒen]
[t̪än u.ˈfä.na‿i t̪an su.ˈpɛɾ.β̞a]

[t̪oɾ.ˈna.ð̞a]
[bɔŋ‿kɔp de faɫs]
[bɔŋ‿kɔp de faɫs‿ð̞e.fen.'soz‿ð̞e ɫa ˈt̪ε.ra, -rɛ]
[bɔŋ‿kɔp de faɫs]

2
[ˈä.ɾ(a)‿ez‿ˈɔ.ɾa se.ɣ̞a.ˈð̞os]
[ˈä.ɾ(a)‿ez‿ˈɔ.ɾa ð̞es.ˈt̪ä‿(a).ˈɫɛɾ.t̪a, -t̪ɛ]
[peɾ kwäm‿ˈbiŋ.ɡi‿un ˈäɫ̪.t̪ɾe ʒuɲ]
[ez.mo.ˈɫem‿bem‿be ɫez‿ˈei̯.nes]

[t̪oɾ.ˈna.ð̞a]

3
[ke t̪ɾe.ˈmɔ.ɫi ɫe.ne.ˈmik]
[em‿be.ˈjen ɫa ˈnɔs.t̪ɾe‿n.ˈse.ɲa, -ɲe]
[kɔɱ‿fem ˈkäw.ɾe‿s.ˈpi.ɣ̞ez‿ð̞ɔr]
[kwäŋ‿kom.ˈbe se.ˈɣ̞em ka.ˈð̞e.nes]

[t̪oɾ.ˈna.ð̞a]

English translation

I
Catalonia triumphant
Shall again be rich and abundant.
Drive away these folks
Who are so proud and arrogant.

Chorus:
Strike with your sickle!
Strike with your sickle, defenders of the land!
Strike with your sickle!

II
Now is the time, reapers,
Now is the time to stand wise.
Let us sharpen well our means,
For when another June comes.

Chorus

III
May the enemy tremble
Upon seeing our symbol.
Just as we cut the wheat's golden ears,
When time calls, we sever the chains.

Chorus

Occitan translation

I
Catalonha triomfant,
tornarà èsser rica e plena.
Endarrièra aquelas gents
amb tan d'ufan e supèrba.

Arrepic:
Bon còp de fauç!
Bon còp de fauç, Defensors de la tèrra!
Bon còp de fauç!

II
Ara es l'ora, segadors.
Ara es l'ora sètz a l'espèra.
Per quand vendrà un autre junh
amolam plan ben las asinas.

Arrepic

III
Que tremòle l'enemic
en vesent la nòstra ensenha.
Coma dalham espigas d'aur,
quand nos cal segam cadenas.

Arrepic

Spanish translation

I
Cataluña, triunfante,
¡volverá a ser rica y plena!
¡Atrás esta gente
tan ufana y tan soberbia!

Estribillo:
¡Buen golpe de hoz!
¡Buen golpe de hoz, defensores de la tierra!
¡Buen golpe de hoz!

II
¡Ahora es hora, segadores!
¡Ahora es hora de estar alerta!
Para cuando venga otro junio
¡afilemos bien las herramientas!

Estribillo

III
Que tiemble el enemigo
al ver nuestra enseña:
como hacemos caer espigas de oro,
cuando conviene segamos cadenas.

Estribillo

=== Original lyrics: pre-1899 ===
c. 1900 choral a capella vocal recording (original lyrics) (verses one and fifteen)
Arranged by Lluís Millet and performed by the Orfeó Català

Catalan original

I
Ai ditxosa Catalunya (Note: Sometimes written Catalunya, comtat gran ([kətəˈluɲə kumˈtat ɡɾan]; English: Catalonia, large county; Spanish: Cataluña, condado grande).)
qui t'ha vista rica i plena!
Ara el rei nostre senyor
declarada ens té la guerra.

II
Lo gran comte d'Olivar
sempre li burxa l'aurella:
“Ara és hora, nostre rei,
ara és hora que fem guerra”.

III
Contra de los catalans
ja ho vegeu quina n'han feta:
seguiren viles i llocs
fins al lloc de Riudarenes,

IV
n'han cremada una església
que Santa Coloma es deia,
cremen albes i casulles
los calzes i les patenes.

V
I el Santíssim Sagrament
alabat sigui per sempre.
Mataren un sacerdot
mentres que la missa deia.

VI
Mataren un cavaller
a la porta de l'iglésia,
Don Lluís de Furrià
i els àngels li fan gran festa.

VII
El pa que no era blanc
deien que era massa negre,
lo daven an els cavalls
sols per assolar la terra.

VIII
Lo vi que no era bo
etgegaven les aixetes,
lo tiraven pels carrers
sols per a regar la terra.

IX
A presència dels seus pares
deshonraven les donzelles.
En daven part al virrei
del mal que aquells soldats feien:

X
“Llicència els he donat io
molta més se'n poden pendre”.

XI
A vista de tot això
s'és esvalotat la terra.
Entraren a Barcelona
mil persones forasteres,

XII
entren com a segadors
com érem a temps de sega.
De tres guàrdies que n'hi ha
ja n'han morta la primera.

XIII
En mataren el virrei
a l'entrant de la galera.
Mataren els diputats
i els jutges de l'Audiència.

XIV
Anaren a la presó
donen llibertat als presos.
Lo bisbe els va beneir
amb la mà dreta i esquerra:

XV
“Ont és vostre capità,
a ont és la vostra bandera?”
Varen treure el bon Jesús
tot cobert amb un vel negre:

XVI
“Aquí és nostre capità
aquí és nostra bandera.
A les armes, catalans,
que us han declarat la guerra”.

English translation

I
Ah, happy Catalonia
who has seen you rich and plentiful!
Now the king our lord
has declared war on us.

II
The great count of Olivar
is always pestering his ear:
"Now is the time, our king.
now is the time to make war."

III
Against the Catalans
see what they have done already:
villages and places followed
up to the place of Riudarenes,

IV
they have burned a church
that was called Santa Coloma,
they are burning white habits and chasubles
the chalices and the patens.

V
And the Blessed Sacrament
praise be to you forever.
They killed a priest
while Mass was being held.

VI
They killed a knight
at the door of the church,
Don Lluís de Furrià
and the angels are making him a big feast.

VII
The bread that was not white
they said was too black,
they gave it to the horses
only to ravage the earth.

VIII
The wine that was not good
they turned on the taps,
they threw it in the streets
only to irrigate the land.

IX
In the presence of their parents
they dishonoured the maidens.
They gave part to the viceroy
of the harm that those soldiers were doing:

X
"I gave them a license
many more can be taken.”

XI
In view of all this
the earth has shaken.
They entered Barcelona
a thousand strangers,

XII
they come in as reapers
as we were in harvest time.
Of three guards there
the first has already died.

XIII
The viceroy was killed
at the entrance to the galley.
They killed the deputies
and the judges of the Court.

XIV
They went to prison
they are releasing the prisoners.
The bishop blessed them
with the right and left hand:

XV
"Where is your captain,
where is your flag?"
They took out the good Jesus
all covered with a black veil:

XVI
"Here is our captain
here is our flag.
To arms, Catalans,
they have declared war on you."

Spanish translation

I
Ay, dichosa Cataluña
quién te ha visto rica y llena.
Ahora el rey nuestro señor
declarada nos tiene la guerra.

II
El gran Conde de Olivares
siempre le hurga la oreja:
"Ahora es la hora, rey nuestro
ahora es hora que hagamos guerra".

III
Contra de los catalanes
ya véis la que han hecho:
Siguieron villas y lugares
hasta el lugar del Riu d'Arenas,

IV
han quemado una iglesia
que Santa Coloma se llamaba,
queman albas y casullas
los cálices y las patenas.

V
Y el Santísimo Sacramento
alabado sea por siempre.
Mataron a un sacerdote
mientras decía la misa.

VI
Mataron a un caballero
a la puerta de la iglesia,
Don Luis de Furrià
y los ángeles le hacen gran fiesta.

VII
El pan que no era blanco
decían que era demasiado negro,
se lo daban a los caballos
solo por asolar la tierra.

VIII
El vino que no era bueno
abrían los grifos [o espitas],
lo tiraban por las calles
solo por regar la tierra.

IX
En presencia de sus padres
deshonraban a las doncellas.
De ello daban parte al Virrey,
del mal que esos soldados hacían:

X
"Licencia les he dado yo
mucha más se pueden tomar".

XI
A la vista de todo esto
se ha alborotado la tierra.
Entraron en Barcelona
mil personas forasteras,

XII
entran como segadores
ya que estaban en tiempos de siega.
De tres guardias que hay
ya han matado a la primera.

XIII
Mataron al Virrey
a la entrada de la galera.
Mataron a los diputados
y a los jueces de la Audiencia.

XIV
Fueron a la prisión
dan libertad a los presos.
El obispo los bendijo
con la mano derecha e izquierda:

XV
"¿dónde está vuestro capitán?
¿dónde está vuestra bandera?"
Sacaron al buen Jesús
todo cubierto con un velo negro:

XVI
"Aquí está nuestro capitán
aquí está nuestra bandera.
A las armas, catalanes,
que os han declarado la guerra".

== Recordings and variations ==
An arrangement of "Els Segadors" appears on "Ballad of the Fallen" by Charlie Haden (1983). Contemporary Catalan composer Jordi Savall made a version of the folk song, using the original narrative (which dates back to the 17th century) combined with the modern lyrics and refrain, which were added later. The song has also been recorded and interpreted by major artists, included on albums such as Traditional Catalan Songs (Victoria de los Ángeles).

In October 2017, in the aftermath of the Catalan independence referendum, the American band A Sound of Thunder released a heavy metal variation of the anthem, using a mix of English and Catalan lyrics.

== See also ==
- Catalan nationalism
- Anthems of the autonomous communities of Spain
- Gernikako Arbola (anthem)
