= Conchita Badía =

Catalan singer

Conxita Badía in 1926

Concepció Badia Millàs (14 November 1897 – 2 May 1975), known by her stage name Conchita Badía or Conxita Badia, was a Spanish soprano and pianist. Admired for her spontaneity, expressiveness, and clear diction, she was considered one of the greatest interpreters of 20th century Catalan, Spanish and Latin American art song. She premiered many works in that genre, including those by Enrique Granados, Manuel de Falla, Frederic Mompou, Alberto Ginastera, and Enric Morera, several of which had been specially written for her voice. The main part of the collection of Badia's sound recordings, scores, letters and pictures is preserved in the Biblioteca de Catalunya. In one of the letters, Pablo Casals wrote: "Everything I've written for a soprano voice has been thinking about you. Therefore, every one is yours."

== Life and career ==
Conxita Badia was born Concepció Badia i Millàs in Barcelona on 14 November 1897 and studied under Enrique Granados, Manuel de Falla and Pablo Casals. She had initially enrolled in the Granados Academy as a piano student, but Granados 'discovered' her voice during a solfège examination. Her first appearance on the stage was as one of the six flower maidens in a performance of Wagner's Parsifal at the Palau de la Música Catalana in 1913 when she was only 15 years old. Her solo recital debut came on 5 April 1915 in the premiere performance of the Granados song cycle, Canciones Amatorias, accompanied by the composer (two of the songs, "Llorad corazón" and "Gracia mía", were dedicated to her by Granados). Following the death of Granados and his wife in the 1916 sinking of the Sussex, she performed in numerous concerts in his memory across Spain and Europe. In 1935, she made only other appearance on the opera stage: to sing the title role in María del Carmen. It was the first time the work had been revived since its initial performances in 1898–1899.

During the 1930s she gave many recitals and concerts in Spain and in the rest of Europe. From 1936 to 1938, due to the Spanish Civil War, she performed more extensively in Europe in cities including London, Brussels, Geneva, Paris, Vienna, and Salzburg. In Vienna, she sang Roberto Gerhard's Sis cançons populars catalanes in their 1932 premiere conducted by Anton Webern. Gerhard had also dedicated his early song cycle L'infantament meravellós de Shahrazada (1916–18) to Badia and later said of her:

"She feels such an intense joy when she sings – joy in the music, joy in her own voice – that it is impossible not to share it when you listen to her."

Badia had married Ricard Agustí Montsech in 1919. The couple has three daughters: Conxita, Mariona, and Carme. In 1936 Badia and her daughters left Spain to escape the Spanish Civil War, while her husband was working in South America. They initially lived in Paris and then in Rio de Janeiro before moving to Argentina where her husband joined them in 1938. In Argentina she continued her close artistic partnership with her fellow exile, Manuel de Falla. She also collaborated closely with the Argentine composers Juan Jose Castro, Carlos Guastavino and Alberto Ginastera, the poet Rafael Alberti, and the Brazilian Heitor Villa-Lobos, among many others. In 1946, she and her family returned to Catalonia, where she introduced many of their songs to Spanish and European audiences, often with her close friend Alicia de Larrocha.

After her return to Catalonia, Badia also taught singing and piano, both privately and in her later years as a professor at Barcelona's Municipal Conservatory of Barcelona. Amongst her pupils were the pianist Joaquín Nin-Culmell and the soprano Montserrat Caballé. She also served on the juries of international singing competitions in South America and Europe, including the Rio de Janeiro International Song Competition, the Mozarteum in Salzburg, and the Francesc Viñas competition in Barcelona.

Conxita Badia died in Barcelona on 2 May 1975. In 1997, the Archivo Manuel de Falla and the University of Granada marked the centenary of her birth with an exhibition and a series of concerts in her honour. The 2012 documentary film, Conxita Badia no existeix directed by Badia's great-granddaughter, Eulàlia Domènech, and co-produced by Televisió de Catalunya chronicles her life and work. The majority of the collection of Badia's sound recordings, scores, letters and pictures donated by her daughters is held in the Biblioteca de Catalunya.

== Recordings ==
- Conchita Badía: Homenaje – Songs by Manuel de Falla, Juan José Castro, Alberto Ginastera, Carlos Guastavino, and others. Recordings of the December 1942 concerts broadcast on Radio El Mundo (Buenos Aires) with de Falla conducting his own music, sung by Badía. The album also includes Badía's 1964 Madrid concert dedicated to songs by Argentinian composers, the majority of which had been composed specially for her. Label: Piscitelli.
- The Catalan Piano Tradition – Conchita Badía, accompanied by Alicia de Larrocha, can be heard singing three songs from Colección de tonadillas by Enrique Granados: No 8. "El mirar de la maja", No 7. "La maja de Goya", and No 5. "El majo Olvidado". Recorded in Barcelona circa 1960. Label: VAI (Video Artists International).
- The Record of Singing: Vol. 3 - 1926-1939 – Conchita Badía, accompanied by Oscar Donato Colacelli, can be heard singing two songs from Colección de tonadillas by Enrique Granados: No 4. "El majo discreto" and No 6. "El majo timido". Recorded in Argentina, 5 October 1940. Label: Testament.
- Homage to Granados – Conchita Badía, accompanied by Alicia de Larrocha, can be heard singing 9 Tonadillas, 3 Majas dolorosas and 6 Canciones amatorias by Enrique Granados. Label: Everest 3237.
- La Renaixenca – Conchita Badía, accompanied by Pere Vallribera, can be heard singing songs by Francesc Alio and Enric Morera. Label: LACANCO Edigsa 10/11.

== Biographies ==
Published biographies of Conxita Badia include:

- Alavedra, Joan (1975). Conxita Badia: Una vida d'artista (Volume 18 of Col·lecció Memòries). Editorial Pòrtic. ISBN 8473061438
- Manso, Carlos (1989). Conchita Badía en la Argentina (Volume 12 of Libros del ayer inconmovible). Ediciones Tres Tiempos. ISBN 9501800962
- Pagès i Santacana, Mònica (2000). Conxita Badia (Volume 120 of Gent nostra. Infiesta Editor. ISBN 8460705447
