= Cant de la Senyera =

"Cant de la Senyera"
"Cant de la Senyera" of Lluís Millet recorded in a phonograph cylinder during a play of the Orfeó Català between 1898 and 1918. This copy is from the National Library of Catalonia.

"Cant de la Senyera" ("Song of The Senyera [flag]") is a composition for mixed chorus with music by Lluís Millet, lyrics based on a poem by Joan Maragall, composed expressly to be the hymn of the Orfeó Català choral group of Barcelona. It debuted at Montserrat in 1896, in a ceremony in honor of the Senyera, the historical flag of Catalonia.

== Prohibition ==
The song was prohibited from 1939 to 1960 under the regime of Spanish caudillo Francisco Franco, as part of Franco's ban on Catalan language and culture. In 1960, while Franco was on a rare visit to Barcelona, four of his ministers, including Minister of the Interior Camilo Alonso Vega, attended the centennial ceremony for Maragall at the Palace of Catalan Music. The Civil Governor of Barcelona, Felipe Acedo, had authorized the concert, but forbade the playing of the "Cant" despite its being based on Maragall's work. The orchestra played a musical arrangement of Cant de la Senyera, upon which a number of Catalan nationalists stood up and sang along, marking a key turning point in the history of Catalan nationalism, a happening known as the Fets del Palau de la Música ("Events of the Palace of Music"). Several people were arrested for singing along, and one, Jordi Pujol, who would later become President of Catalonia, was arrested, tortured, and sentenced to seven years in prison.

== Role ==
The song served as a de facto Catalan anthem, alongside "Els Segadors", though the latter was only made official in 1993.

== Lyrics ==
Catalan

Refrain:
Al damunt dels nostres cants
aixequem una Senyera
que els farà més triomfants.

Au, companys, enarborem-la
en senyal de germandat!
Au, germans, al vent desfem-la
en senyal de llibertat.
Que voleï! Contemplem-la
en sa dolça majestat!

Refrain

Oh bandera catalana!,
nostre cor t'és ben fidel:
volaràs com au galana
pel damunt del nostre anhel:
per mirar-te sobirana
alçarem els ulls al cel.

Refrain

I et durem arreu enlaire,
et durem, i tu ens duràs:
voleiant al grat de l'aire,
el camí assenyalaràs.
Dóna veu al teu cantaire,
llum als ulls i força al braç.

Refrain

English (unofficial translation)

Refrain:
On top of our songs
we raise a symbol
which will make them more triumphant.

Come, companions, let's hoist her
in sign of brotherhood!
Come, brothers, to the wind let's unfurl her
in sign of freedom.
Let her fly! Let's admire her
in her sweet majesty!

Refrain:

Oh Catalan flag!,
our heart to you is very faithful;
You will fly like gallant bird
over our longing:
to see you sovereign
we will lift our eyes to the sky.

Refrain:

And we'll take you everywhere raised,
we'll carry you, and you will take us:
fluttering at the wind's whims,
the way you'll mark.
Give voice to your singer,
light in the eyes and strength in the arms.

Refrain:
