= Francesc Alió =

Catalan composer, pianist and musicologist

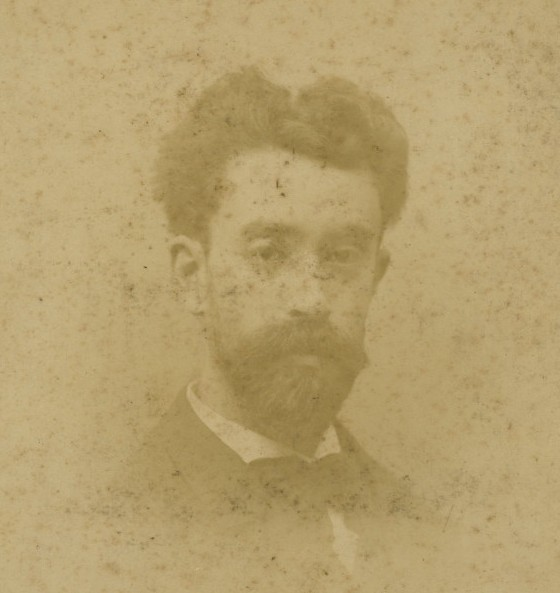
Portrait of Francesc Alio I Brea

Francesc Alió i Brea (Spanish Francisco Alió; Barcelona, 27 March 1862 – Barcelona, 31 March 1908) was a Spanish composer. In 1892, he wrote the music of Els Segadors, the Catalan national anthem, based on a folk tune, in his Cançons populars catalanes. He was one of the generation turning to Catalan song in the 1890s.

== Works, editions and recordings ==
- Cançó de l'estrella; Plor de la tòrtora on Jacint Verdaguer i el lied català. M. Teresa Garrigosa, soprano; Emili Blasco, piano La mà de Guido, 2005.
- La Renaixenca – Conchita Badía, soprano; Pere Vallribera, piano. Sings Cançons Populars Catalanes and songs by Enric Morera. Vinyl LP. Label: LACANCO Edigsa 10/11.
