= Catalan People's Army =

Catalan separatist paramilitary group

- Exèrcit Popular Català
- Leader: Jaume Martínez Vendrell
- Founded: 1969
- Dissolved: 1979
- Ideology: Catalan independence Socialism

The Catalan People's Army (Exèrcit Popular Català, EPOCA), known by its members as La Casa, was a Catalan nationalist paramilitary group which existed during the 1970s.

== History ==
The group was founded in 1969, as a breakaway group of the National Front of Catalonia. Jaume Martínez Vendrell, the leader of the military wing of the National Front, became its commander. EPOCA trained its militants in urban warfare techniques, smuggling in weaponry from Switzerland.

The group came to prominence through a number of assassinations, committed by attaching pressure-triggered bombs to the bodies of their victims, demanding ransom, and when this was not paid, leaving the bombs to explode, killing their victims. In this way, the group assassinated in 1977 the industrialist and chemical tycoon José María Bultó, and in 1978 the ex-mayor of Barcelona, Joaquín Viola, along with his wife.

By 1979, the group had become inactive in comparison with many other contemporary groups. Following discussions with paramilitaries from Terra Lliure, the groups decided to merge. This led to many of the better-trained EPOCA militants joining Terra Lliure.

== Trials and justice ==
Seven people were arrested in connection with the killings of Bultó and the Violas. Two of them were tried in 1980; one was acquitted entirely, whilst Martínez Vendrell, the other, was sentenced to a year and three months in prison, although this was not directly related to the assassinations. However, he had already served this time awaiting trial, so was immediately released. The remaining five were tried in 1982, saying at the time that they "learned of the assassination through the newspapers and television".

A number of additional arrests were made towards the end of 1980 in connection with the construction of the bombs that were used in the killings.

== See also ==
- Terra Lliure
- Front d'Alliberament de Catalunya
