= Just Cabot =

Catalan writer and journalist

Just Cabot i Ribot (1898 in Barcelona – 1961 in Paris) was a Catalan writer and journalist. He was an editor for La Publicitat and then for the new journal L'Esport Català founded by ca:Amadeu Hurtado.
