= Jordi Pujol =

Catalan politician

The Right Honourable Jordi Pujol
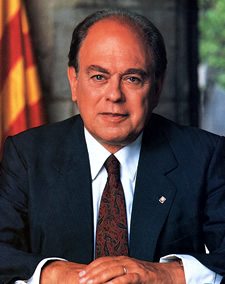
- Official portrait, 1980

126th President of the Government of Catalonia
- In office 29 April 1980 – 18 December 2003
- First Counselor: Artur Mas (2001–2003)
- Preceded by: Josep Tarradellas
- Succeeded by: Pasqual Maragall

Minister without Portfolio
- In office 5 December 1977 – 24 April 1980
- President: Josep Tarradellas

Member of the Parliament of Catalonia
- In office 10 April 1980 – 23 September 2003
- Constituency: Barcelona

Member of the Congress of Deputies
- In office 1 July 1977 – 12 March 1980
- Constituency: Barcelona

Personal details
- Born: 9 June 1930 (age 95) Barcelona, Catalonia, Spain
- Party: CDC (1974–2016)
- Spouse: Marta Ferrusola (m. 1956; died 2024)
- Children: 7

Jordi Pujol i Soley (Catalan pronunciation: [ˈʒɔɾði puˈʒɔl i suˈlɛj], born 9 June 1930) is a retired Catalan politician who was the leader of the party Convergència Democràtica de Catalunya (CDC) from 1974 to 2003, and President of the Generalitat de Catalunya from 1980 to 2003.

He was tried in 2025 for corruption, suspected of having received illegal commissions worth hundreds of million euros in exchange for political favors during his terms in office. Several of his children, who became businesspeople, are also said to have become considerably wealthy alongside him.

== Early life ==
Pujol was born in Barcelona, studied at the German School of Barcelona and received a medical degree from the University of Barcelona. During his college years, he joined different activist groups that were seeking to rebuild the ideal Catalonia that the Spanish Civil War and Franco's dictatorship had undermined. Among these organizations were Grup Torras i Bages (where he met other activists such as Jaume Carner or Joan Reventós), Comissió Abat Oliva, Grup Pere Figuera or Cofradia de la Mare de Déu de Montserrat de Virtèlia.

In 1960, in the course of an homage to Catalan poet Joan Maragall, held in Palau de la Música Catalana, part of the audience sang the Cant de la Senyera (The Song of the Flag in English) despite being previously prohibited by the Spanish authorities. Pujol was among those who organized this protest, and he was captured and detained for his protests against the regime of Francisco Franco.

=== Invention of Neobacitrin ointment ===
As a physician, Pujol was inventor of the antibiotic ointment Neobacitrin while working in the family-run laboratory Fides Cuatrecasas. The ointment went on to achieve great success and is still used today.

== Political career and President of Catalonia ==
In 1974, Pujol founded the political party called Convergència Democràtica de Catalunya (CDC) (Democratic Convergence of Catalonia in English), of which he was the first Secretary. The political party was not legalized until 1977, during the Spanish transition to democracy after Franco's death in November 1975.

From 1977 to 1980, Pujol was Minister without portfolio in the Provisional government of Catalonia, presided by Josep Tarradellas. In 1977 he led Pacte Democràtic per Catalunya, a coalition of Catalan parties that were trying to approve the Statute of Autonomy of Catalonia. In the Spanish general election of 1977 he was elected to the Spanish Congress of Deputies, representing Barcelona. Pujol was re-elected at the 1979 General Election but resigned from the parliament in 1980.

On 20 March 1980, the first Parliament of Catalonia elections after Franco's regime were held. The Catalan nationalist party Convergència i Unió (coalition of CDC and Democratic Union of Catalonia) won the elections and Pujol was elected President of the Generalitat de Catalunya on 24 April 1980. He was reelected in 1984, 1988, 1992, 1995 and 1999.

Pujol is a supporter of European integration. In 1985, he started a collaboration with Edgar Faure in the Council of the Regions of Europe (CRE), which would later become the Assembly of European Regions (AER). Pujol was the President of the Assembly of European Regions from 1992 to 1996. In 1996, he was made an officer of the National Order of Quebec for strengthening ties between Quebec and Catalonia.

Pujol retired in 2003. He left leadership of the party (CDC) to Artur Mas. That year, he gave the Biblioteca de Catalunya a bibliographic collection of more than 16,000 documents from his presidency.

== Pujol and Catalan nationalism ==
During the last decades of the Franco regime and his 23 years as President of the Generalitat de Catalunya, Pujol leant towards the majority tendency in Catalan nationalism, which, instead of seeking a fully independent republic, intended to work towards a federalized Spain that would, according to Pujol, recognize Catalonia "as a country, as a collective with its own personality and differences," and a "guarantee that her own identity be respected". With the conservative People's Party opposing the Catalan Statute of Autonomy, however, as well as the recognition for the language in the east of Aragon, Pujol has stated that, at least shortly before the Spanish transition to democracy, "there is more aggression towards Catalonia than ever", and that Catalans can "no longer hope for anything from the Spanish state".

A lifelong federalist, Pujol has recently become very disenfranchised by the Spanish political arena. He also has recently stated, regarding the recent surge of Catalan separatism that more people than ever want independence, "and they have the right to want it."

== Personal life ==
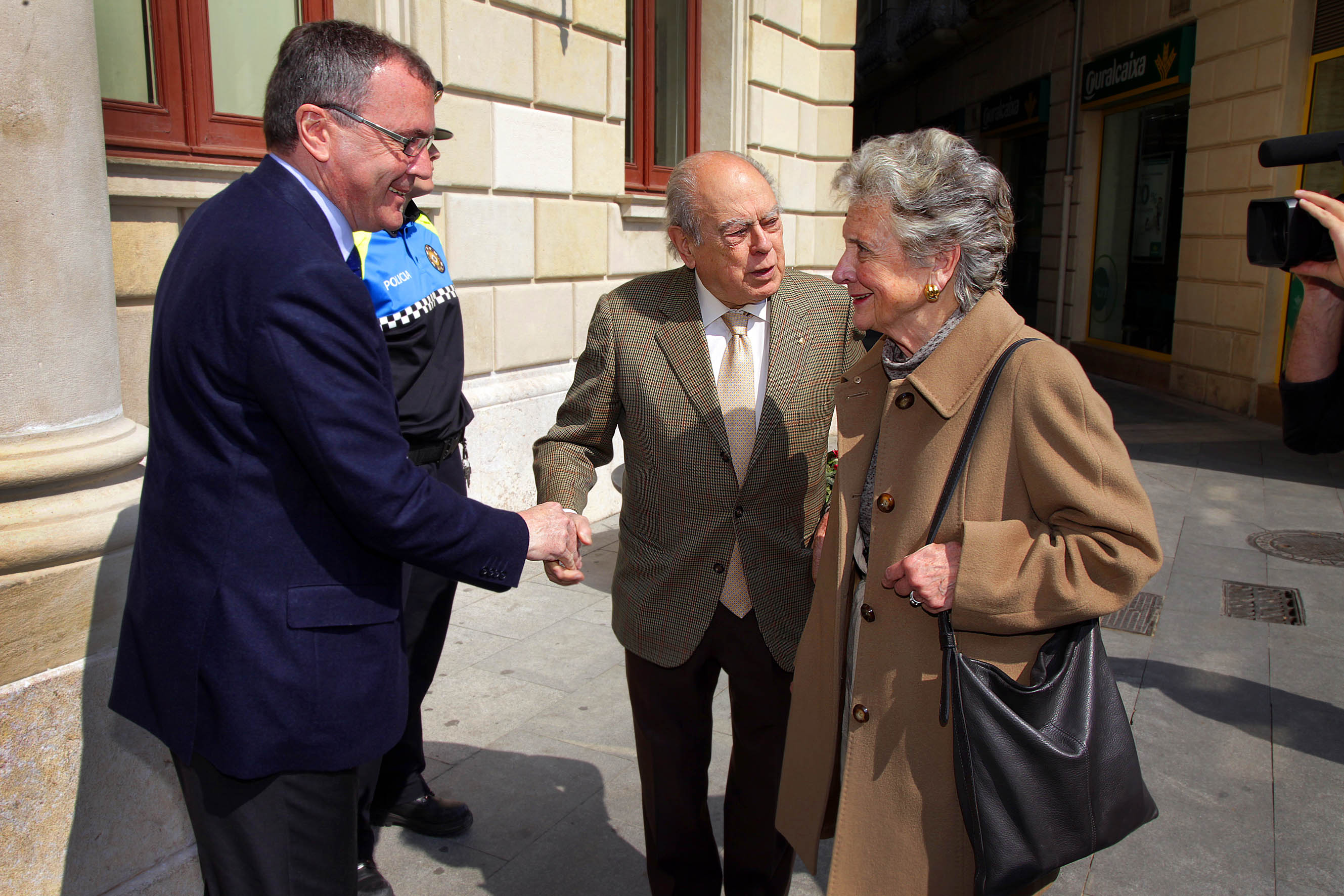
Pujol and Marta Ferrusola in Reus, 23 March 2012

He married Marta Ferrusola in Santa Maria de Montserrat in 1956. The couple had seven children. During COVID-19 pandemic in Spain, on 15 January 2021 Pujol and his wife Marta tested positive for COVID-19 and, without serious symptoms, they were confined to their home in Barcelona. Marta died on 8 July 2024 at the age of 89 after suffering from Alzheimer's disease for six years.

== Corruption scandals ==
In July 2014, Jordi Pujol released a note explaining that for 34 years, including 23 as the President of Catalonia, he had maintained secret foreign bank accounts inherited from his father. The note apologized for his actions and explained that the millions had been declared and taxes paid. The scandal erupted in the Spanish media as it involves allegations against many family members, including trafficking of influence, bribery, money laundering and public corruption. At this time, his sons Jordi and Oleguer Pujol Ferrusola are being investigated by tax authorities. Another son Oriol Pujol resigned from his leadership position in CiU earlier in the month to face charges of public corruption as well. As a direct result of Pujol's admission on 29 July, Judge Pablo Ruz issued an indictment against Jordi Pujol Ferrusola and his wife for money laundering and tax evasion.

On 29 July Catalan president Artur Mas, after a meeting with Pujol, announced that Pujol renounced both his salary and the office that he had been assigned as ex-president, as well as the honorary title of founding chairman of CDC and CiU. The opposition parties from both left and right, nationalist and non-nationalist, have demanded he testify before the parliament. The main government allies in the Catalan parliament, Esquerra Republicana, have declared that they support stripping Pujol of all his honors. The Catalan government has declared this a "private matter" that will have no impact on the movement for Catalan independence and the referendum scheduled for 9 November 2014. In announcing his resignation from all party offices, President Mas initially stated that Pujol would keep the right to be called "The Right Honorable" as a former president of Catalonia. Hours later the party spokesperson Francesc Homs stated that Pujol must "forfeit everything," including the Medalla de Oro of Catalunya and all honorifics previously awarded to him. Indicative of the conflicted reaction of many Catalan nationalists, his personal friend Xavier Trias, the Mayor of Barcelona, lamented on Catalonia Radio "He must disappear...He failed us. It is a disaster that has taken place and the shadowy times of Pujol are finished while a new era begins." Perhaps no one is more deeply conflicted than current President Mas who has acknowledged that Pujol is his "political father" and has stated that "he does not know the details and he is not interested in them either." The impact of the Pujol family scandals on the Catalan independence movement, the CIU party and Mas' political future remain to be seen.

Pujol and his family have been suspected for many years of cashing in on the political power he amassed as a 23-year president of Catalonia. In 1984 his family's bank went bankrupt and was taken over by the Spanish government. His children have amassed a fortune in private businesses that frequently did business and received contracts from the Catalan government. Pujol's wife and children have investments in the tens of millions of dollars in Mexico, Panama and Argentina. Financial records show the movement of money between foreign banks in Andorra, Switzerland, Jersey, Cayman Islands and other tax havens in excess of €100 million. Critics, including Jordi Pujol Ferrusola's former girlfriend, charge that this family wealth could not be accumulated from a family inheritance or successful business practices. Ever since the 1984 bankruptcy of Banca Catalana, as well as in subsequent years, whenever corruption allegations were made against Pujol, his supporters claimed that the charges were politically motivated against Catalonia.

The matter is still under investigation in 2017.

=== Impact ===
In early September 2014, public opinion polls began to show a measurable impact of the Pujol scandals on Catalan politics and public opinion. According to a poll conducted by El Periódico, a Catalan newspaper, 55% of Catalan voters believe the scandals will negatively affect the "right to decide" on November 9. El País, a Madrid newspaper, likewise found in its polling that 54% of Catalans believe that the corruption scandals are having a negative effect on the independence movement. In addition, over 78% of those Catalans polled by El Periódico believed that the Pujol family had collected illegal payments for government contracts habitually. In anticipation of the 11 September national holiday, the Diada, as well as the planned November 9 vote, the political strategies of the major parties are in flux. Pujol's old party has moved to a position of both welcoming (and limiting) his testimony in the Catalan parliament and reasserting that the critics are seeking political advantage from the investigations. Through its public statements the party is trying to remain optimistic about holding the vote while at the same time recognizing that the planned consultation may be deemed unconstitutional by Spain's Constitutional court. While the difficulty of maintaining the sovereignty alliance, and the competing demands of legality and democracy, is undeniably challenging for President Mas, his political decision-making has become increasingly difficult due to the Pujol scandals.

On 5 September 2014 The Jordi Pujol Center for Studies announced its closing. The center had been the major focus of Pujol's work in retirement sponsoring different academic activities related to ethics and disseminating his political philosophy. The Catalan government and many private sources of income ended their affiliations and it was decided that it was no longer a viable entity in light of the scandals.

Political offices
Preceded by Josep Tarradellas; In exile from 1954 to 1977	President of the Government of Catalonia; 1980 – 2003	Succeeded by Pasqual Maragall
Preceded by New title	Minister Without Portfolio; With Antoni Guitérrez Diaz, Joan Reventós, Carles Sentís and Josep Mª Traginer; 1977–1980	Succeeded by Post Abolished
Party political offices
Preceded by New title	Secretary-General of CDC; 1974 – 1989	Succeeded by Miquel Roca i Junyent
Preceded by Ramon Trias Fargas	President of CDC; 1989 – 2012	Succeeded by Artur Mas
