= Lluís Millet =

Spanish composer and musician (1867–1941)

Lluís Millet i Pagès
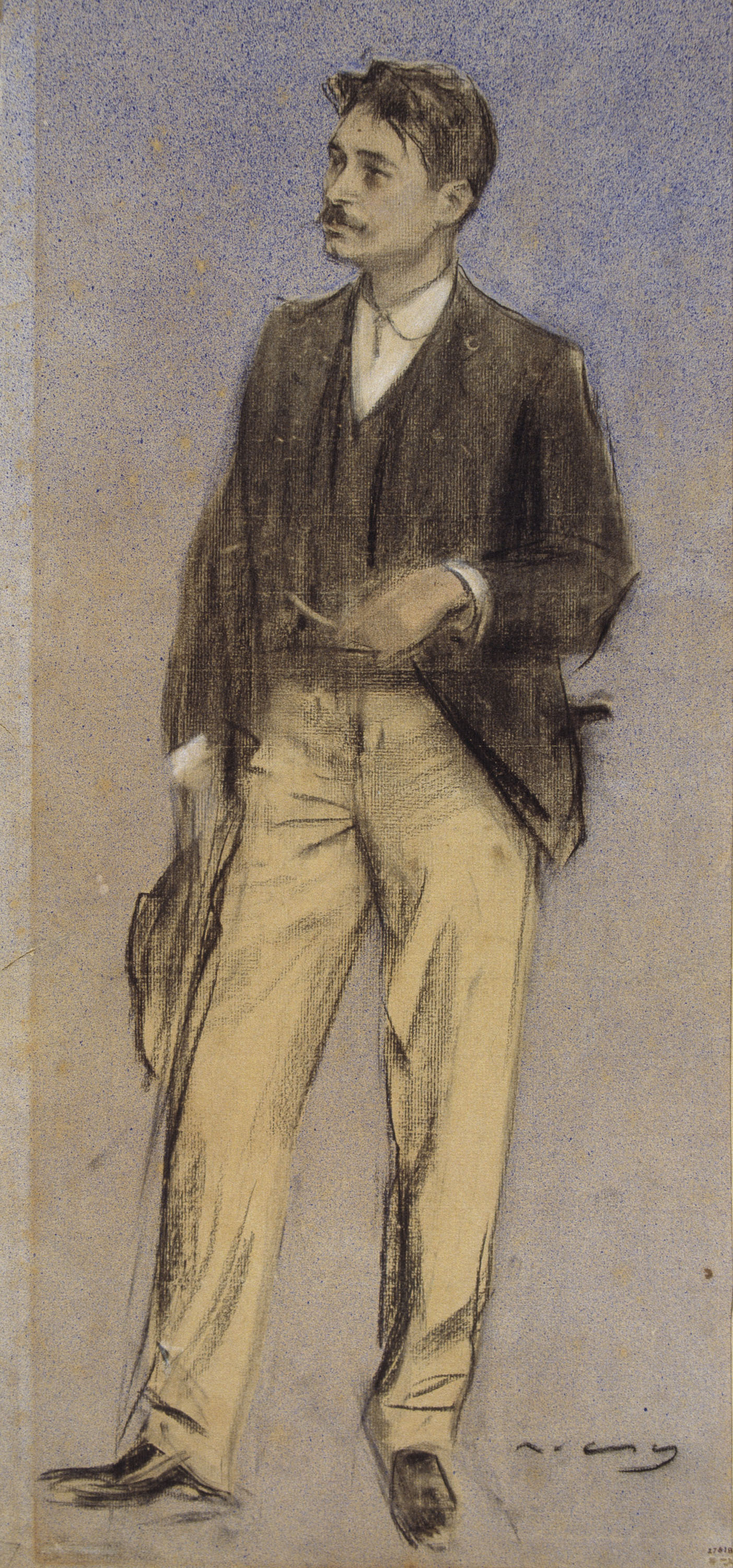
- Portrait of Lluís Millet by Ramon Casas
- Born: 18 April 1867; El Masnou
- Died: 7 December 1941 (aged 74); Barcelona
- Monuments: Statue of Lluís Millet at the Palau de la Musica Catalana
- Occupations: composer, musician
- Known for: Co-founder of Orfeó Català

Lluís Millet i Pagès (18 April 1867 in El Masnou – 7 December 1941 in Barcelona) was a Spanish Catalan composer, musician and co-founder of Orfeó Català in 1891.

A student of Felip Pedrell, from 1896 he taught choral music at Barcelona's Escuela Municipal de Musica where he later succeeded Nicolau as director.

He died in 1941 and is interred in the Montjuïc Cemetery in Barcelona.

== Education and training ==
Lluís Millet's family moved to Barcelona to escape the threats posed by the Third Carlist War. The family wanted Lluís to become a merchant, but he followed the musical career by enrolling at the Conservatory of the Liceu of Barcelona. There he trained under Miquel Font and Josep Rodoreda, and Carles G. Vidiella.

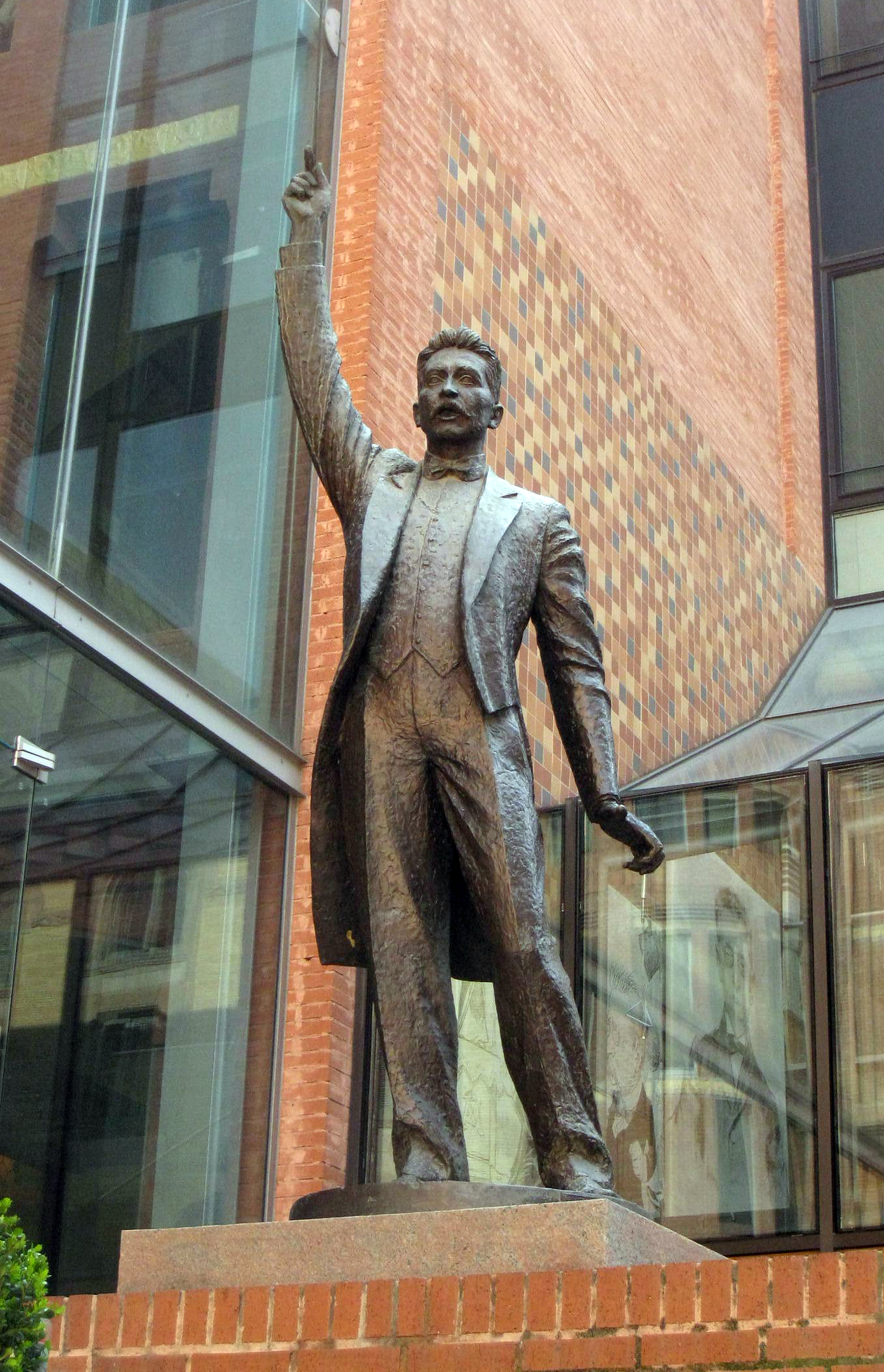
Statue of Lluís Millet at the Palau de la Música Catalana

== Early career ==
Lluís Millet was early attracted to choir songs, and aged just 17 he became conductor of the Chorus the "La Lira de Sant Cugat del Vallès." He also had a job at the Cafè Inglés in Barcelona, first as pianist and later as a member of a trio with Josep Badia, the violinist, and Lluís Pamies, who played the harmonium.

== Selected works ==
- Egloga for orchestra
- Catalanesques for orchestra
- Cant de la Senyera
