= Catalan Liberation Front =

Catalan Liberation Front Front d'Alliberament de Catalunya Front d'Alliberament Català
- Leader: Josep Digón i Balaguer; Carles Garcia Solé; Jordi Vera i Arús
- Founded: 1969
- Dissolved: 1977
- Headquarters: Barcelona and Perpignan
- Newspaper: Catalunya Roja
- Armed wing: Organització Especial
- Ideology: Catalan nationalism Catalan independence Communism; Marxism-Leninism; Antifascism
- Political position: Far-left
- Political wing: Catalan Revolutionary Movement

Catalan Liberation Front (Catalan: Front d'Alliberament Català) was a separatist group in Catalonia, Spain. FAC was formed in 1969 by people from the Catalan National Council (CNC) and the Working Youth of Catalan State (JOEC). The same year FAC initiated violent actions against Francoist Spain.

In 1972 a series of FAC militants were captured and tortured. A major section of the movement went into exile, first to Andorra and the Catalan region of France, and later to Brussels. In exile the organization oriented itself towards the left, adopted Marxism-Leninism as its ideology and proclaimed its objective to form a Communist Party of Catalonia. These changes were confirmed at the First Conference of FAC, held in Brussels 1973. FAC started publishing Catalunya Roja. In 1974 the group Revolutionary Left joined FAC.

The armed operations of FAC were then carried out by a 'Special Organisation' (Organització Especial). In 1975 FAC again suffered a wave of detention and captures. Part of the organisation formed the Catalan Revolutionary Movement (MRC) in 1975, to mobilise popular and legal support to the struggle of FAC. By 1977 both FAC and MRC had ceased to exist.
