= Orfeó Català =

Choral society based in Barcelona, Spain

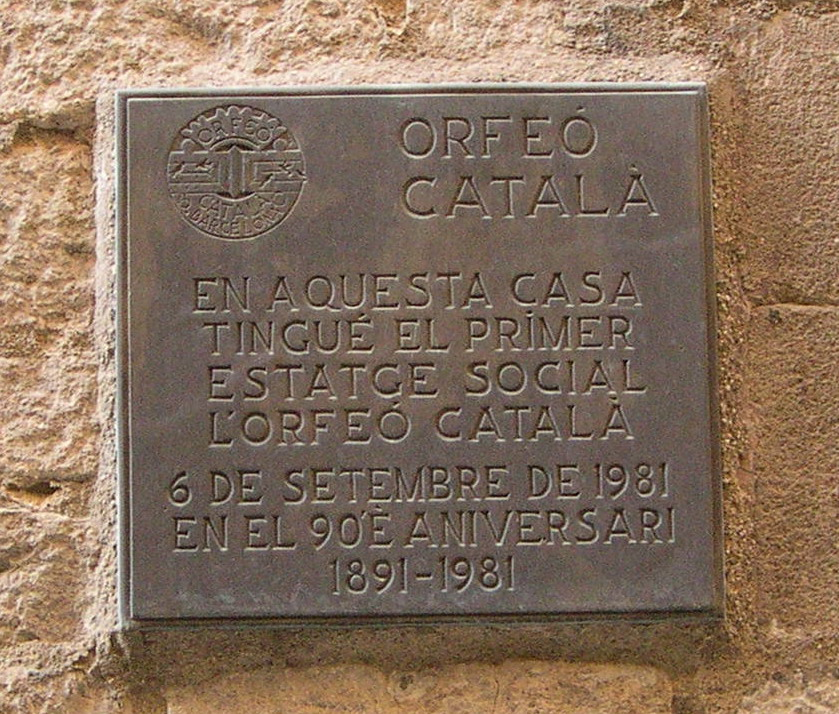
Plaque on the building in Carrer de Lledó in Barcelona, where Orfeó Català was first based

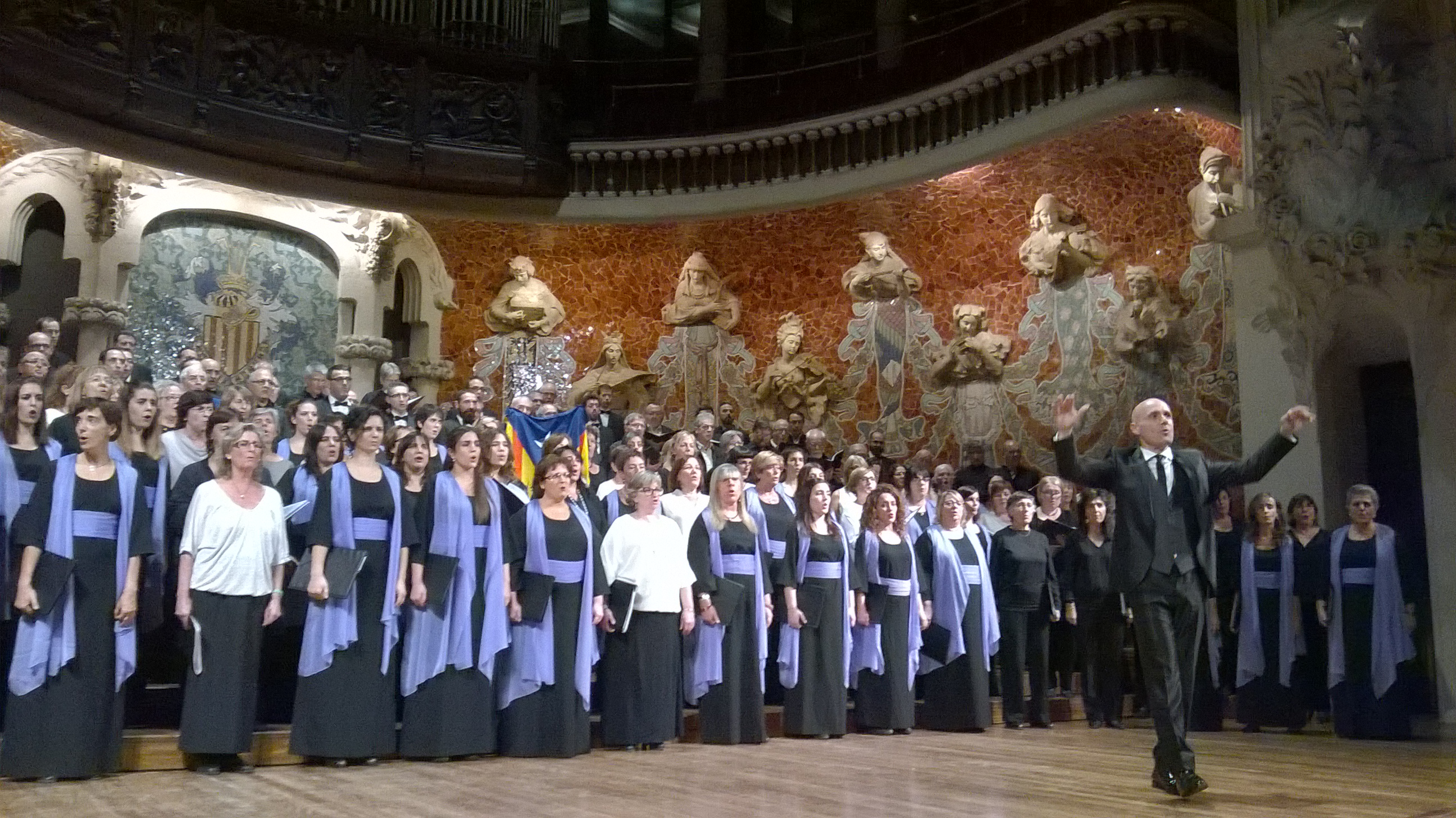
Orfeó Català performing in 2014

The Orfeó Català is a choral society based in Barcelona, Catalonia, Spain, which was founded in 1891 by Lluís Millet and Amadeu Vives.

The Palau de la Música Catalana, a major Barcelona landmark, was commissioned for the choral society in 1904, and completed in 1908.
