= Palau de la Música Catalana =

Concert hall in Barcelona, Spain

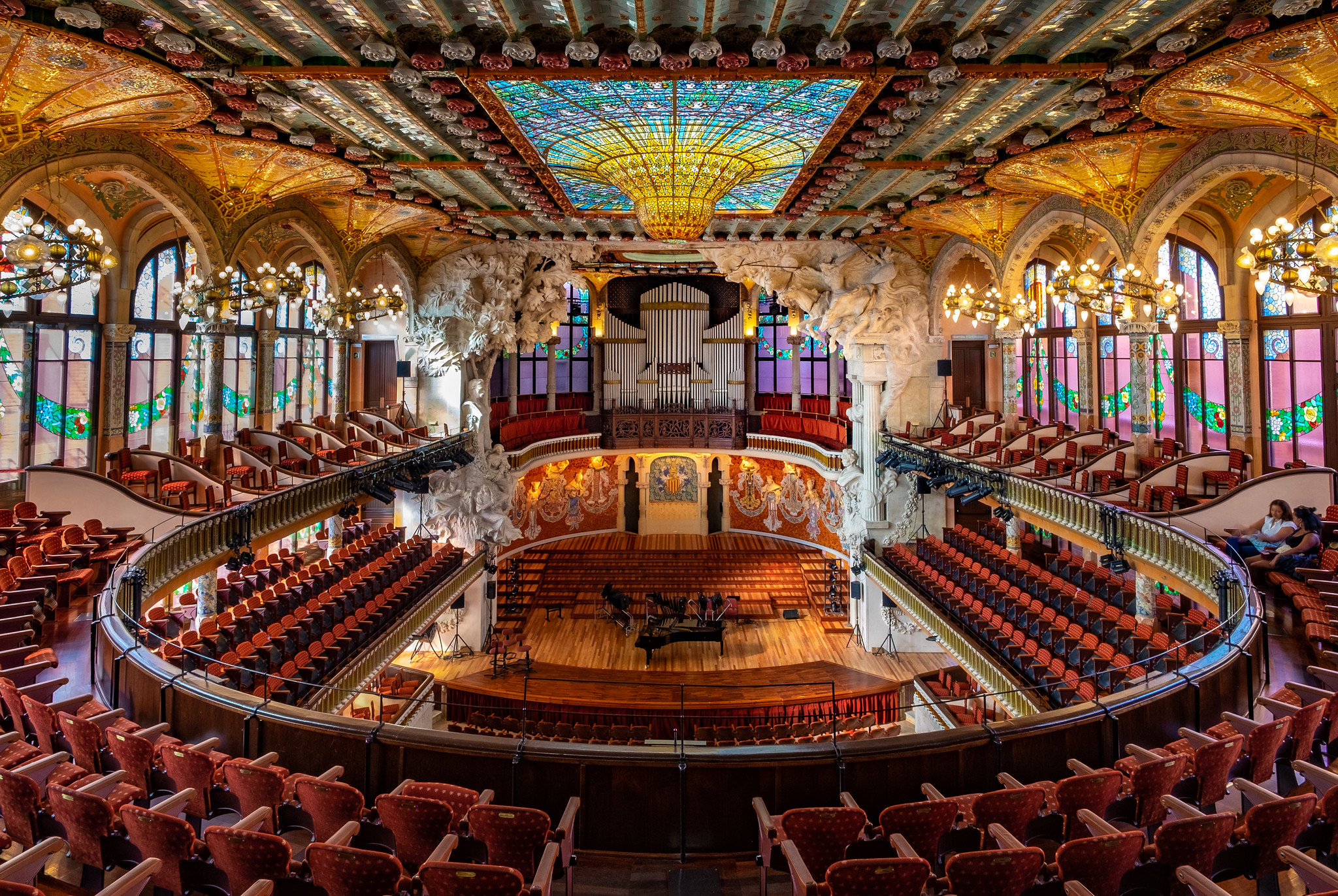
- The Palau de la Música Catalana in 2019
- Interactive map of Palau de la Música Catalana
- Location: Barcelona, Spain
- Coordinates: 41°23′15″N 2°10′32″E
- Type: Concert hall

Construction
- Built: 1905–1908
- Opened: 9 February 1908
- Architect: Lluís Domènech i Montaner

Website
- Official website

UNESCO World Heritage Site
- Part of: Palau de la Música Catalana and Hospital de Sant Pau, Barcelona
- Criteria: Cultural: i, ii, iv
- Reference: 804bis-001
- Inscription: 1997 (21st Session)

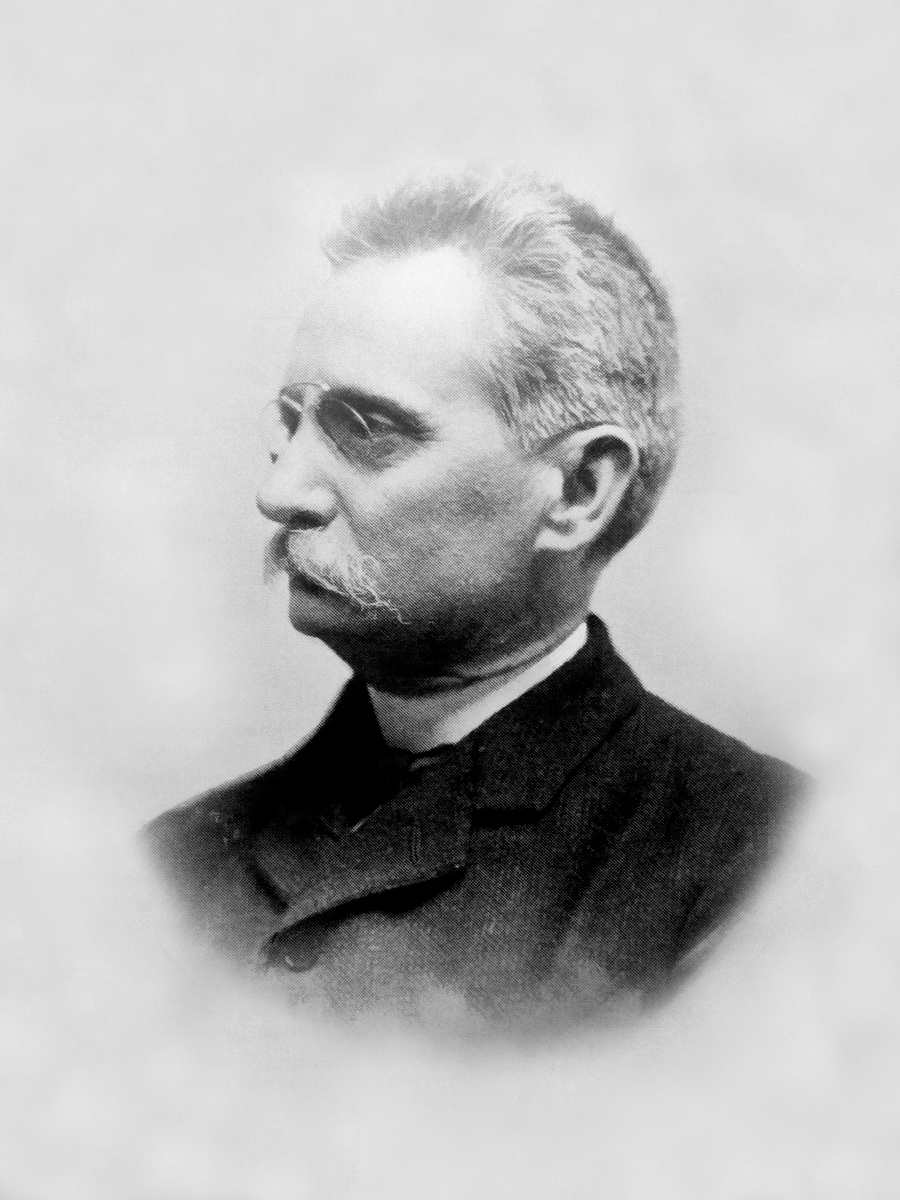
Architect Lluís Domènech i Montaner

Palau de la Música Catalana (Catalan pronunciation: [pəˈlaw ðə lə ˈmuzikə kətəˈlanə], English: Palace of Catalan Music) is a concert hall in Barcelona, Catalonia, Spain. Designed in the Catalan modernista style by the architect Lluís Domènech i Montaner, it was built between 1905 and 1908 for Orfeó Català, a choral society founded in 1891 that was a leading force in the Catalan cultural movement that came to be known as the Renaixença (Catalan Rebirth). It was inaugurated on 9 February 1908.

The construction project was mainly financed by Orfeó Català, but important financial contributions also came from Barcelona's wealthy industrialists and bourgeoisie. The palace won the architect an award from the Barcelona City Council in 1909, given to the best building built during the previous year. Between 1982 and 1989, the building underwent extensive restoration, remodeling, and extension under the direction of architects Oscar Tusquets and Carles Díaz. In 1997, the palace de la Música Catalana was declared a UNESCO World Heritage Site along with Hospital de Sant Pau. Today, more than half a million people a year attend musical performances in the Palau that range from symphonic and chamber music to jazz and Cançó (Catalan song).

== Architect ==
The Palau de la Música Catalana was designed by Lluís Domènech i Montaner. Montaner was a Catalan architect and politician. He was born in Barcelona in December 1850. He studied physics and natural sciences in Madrid, and completed his architectural studies in 1873 at the University of Barcelona. He spent 45 years as a professor and director at the Escola d'Arquitectura, the school of architecture in Barcelona. His personal designs fit in with the Art Nouveau movement, and featured decorative elements such as mosaics and stained glass.

== Building ==
=== Location ===
The palace is located in the corner of a cramped street, Carrer Palau de la Música, and Carrer de Sant Pere Mes Alt, in the section of old Barcelona known as Casc Antic. Most of the other prominent modernista buildings, those designed by Antoni Gaudí, for example, are located in the chic 19th-century extension of the city known as the Eixample.

=== Design ===
The design of the palace is typical of Catalan modernism in that curves predominate over straight lines, dynamic shapes are preferred over static forms, and rich decoration that emphasizes floral and other organic motifs is used extensively. In contrast to many other buildings built in the modernisme style, however, it must also be said that the design of the palace is eminently rational. It pays strict attention to function and makes full use of the most up-to-date materials and technologies available at the beginning of the 20th century (e.g., steel framing). As Tim Benton has commented:

"To eyes unaccustomed to the architecture of Barcelona, the impression of a riot of ornament lacking any logic or control seems overwhelming. And yet the building follows exactly the exhortations of the [architectural] rationalists. The structure, in brick and iron, is clearly expressed." Actually, its walls are the first example of curtain wall structures.

During the palace's construction, local patrons who were increasingly influenced by the Renaixença movement requested that the architect utilize materials and techniques reflecting Catalan identity. In response, the architect commissioned various local artisans and craftsmen, granting them creative autonomy to produce the building's notable ornamentation, sculpture, and decorative structural elements.

=== Façade ===
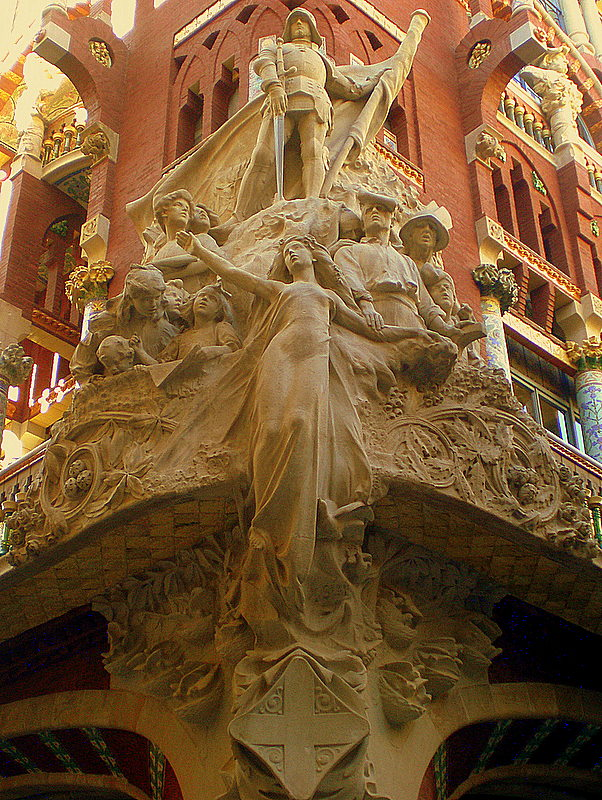
Miquel Blay's sculptural group (The Catalan song) on the corner.

The rich decoration of the façade of the palace, which incorporates elements from many sources, including traditional Spanish and Arabic architecture, is successfully married with the building's structure. The exposed red brick and iron, the mosaics, the stained glass, and the glazed tiles were chosen and situated to give a feeling of openness and transparency. Even Miguel Blay's massive sculptural group symbolizing Catalan music on the corner of the building does not impede the view into or out from the interior (see photograph). As Carandell and co-authors (2006, 20) have pointed out, in the palace "the house as a defense and protected inner space has ceased to exist".

Two colonnades enjoy a commanding position on the second-level balcony of the main façade. Each column is covered uniquely with multicolored glazed tile pieces in mostly floral designs and is capped with a candelabrum that at night blazes with light (see photograph). Above the columns are large busts of Giovanni Pierluigi da Palestrina, Johann Sebastian Bach, and Ludwig van Beethoven on the main façade and Richard Wagner on the side. The top of the main façade is graced by a large allegoric mosaic by Lluís Bru that represents the members of the Orfeó Català, but it is impossible to see it clearly from the narrow street below.

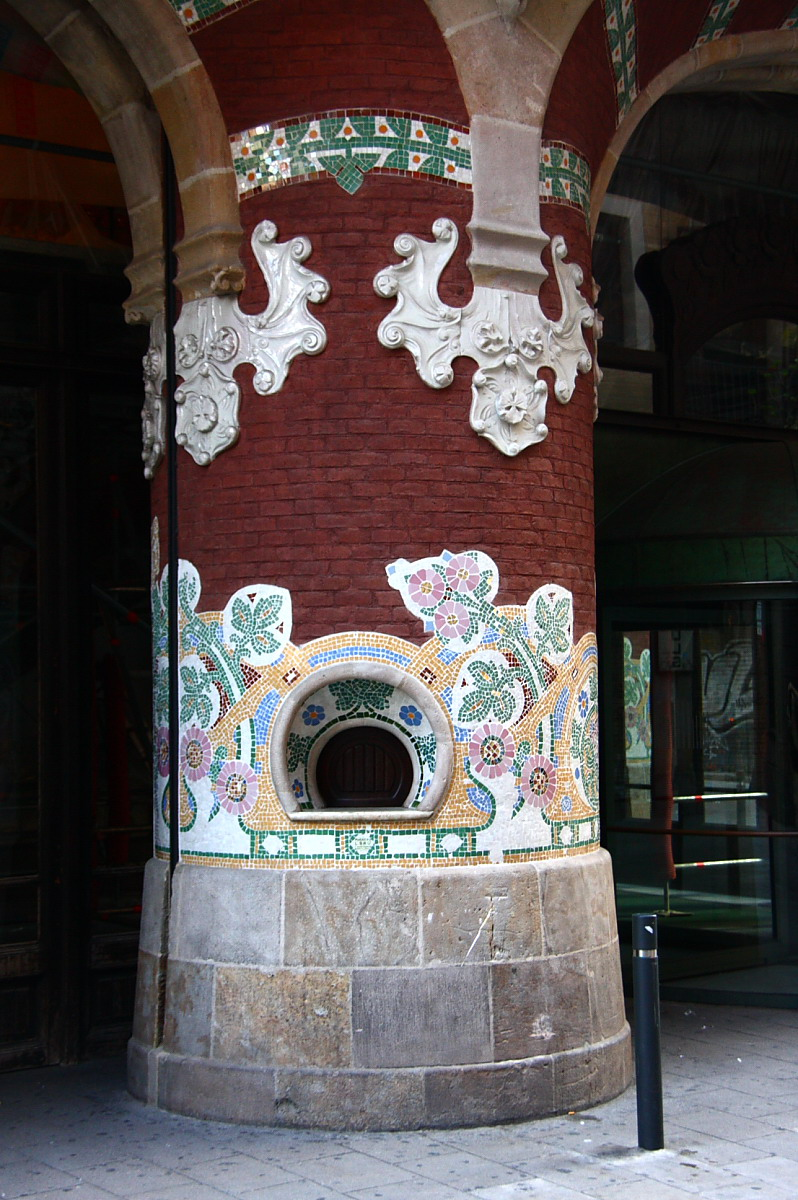
Former ticket box, in an entrance pillar.

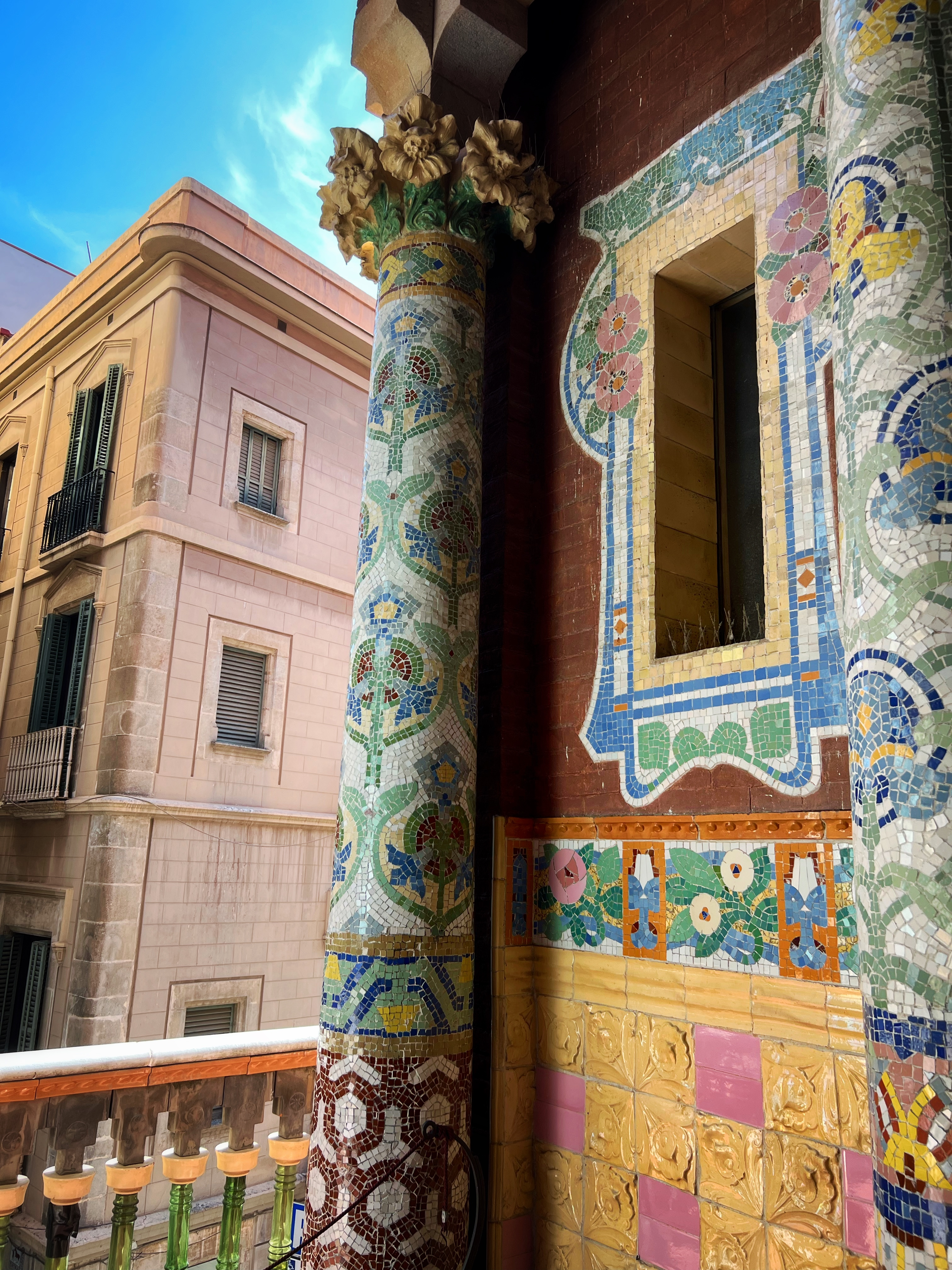
Mosaic on balcony façade

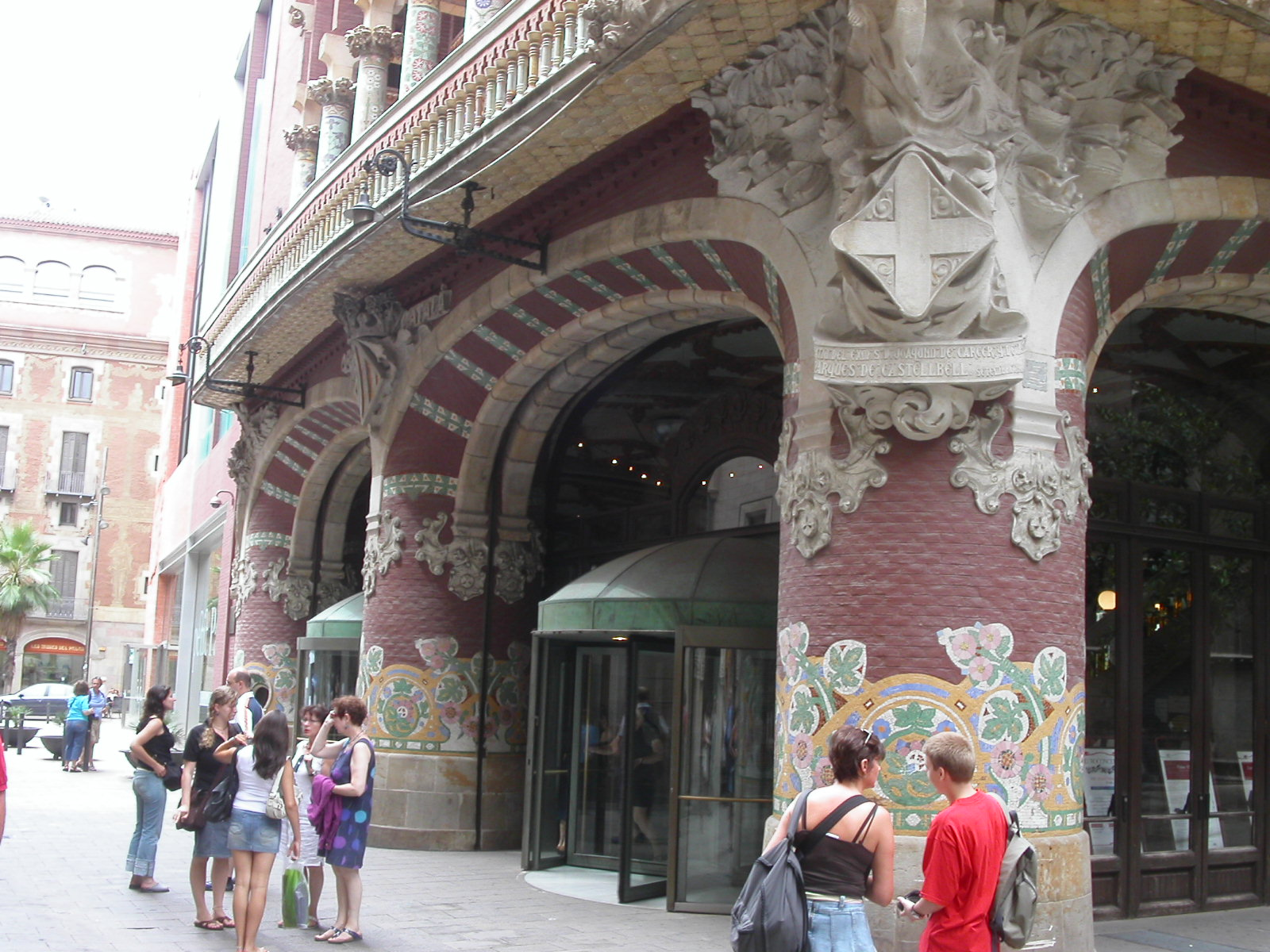
A detail from the entrance

=== Entrance ===
Originally, guests entered the palace from the street through two arches supported by thick pillars that opened into the vestibule. The former ticket windows, which are located in the center pillar, are beautiful concentric arches adorned with floral mosaics of various materials created by Lluís Bru.

=== Vestibule, staircases, and foyer ===
The ceiling of the vestibule is decorated with glazed ceramic moldings that are arranged in the shape of stars. From the vestibule, on the left and right, grand marble staircases ascend from between crowned lamps on columns to bring visitors to the second floor. The balustrades of the staircases, also marble, are supported by unusual transparent yellow glass balusters. The underside of the staircases is covered with tiles that form gleaming canopies on either side of the vestibule.

Today, guests generally enter the palace through the foyer, which was created in the renovations of Tusquets and Díaz from what originally were the headquarters of the Orfeó Català. The large space of the foyer is more soberly decorated than the rest of the palace, but the wide exposed brick arches with their marvelous glazed green, pink, and yellow ceramic flowers recapitulate the ornamentation of the rest of building. The foyer features a large counter where tapas and beverages can be served to concert-goers or visitors who are touring the building. The bar is situated between massive pillars of brick and is illuminated from behind by expansive stained-glass panes that are suspended above it. A glass case in the foyer displays the Orfeó Català's banner, which bears its crest embroidered on fabric in the modernisme style.

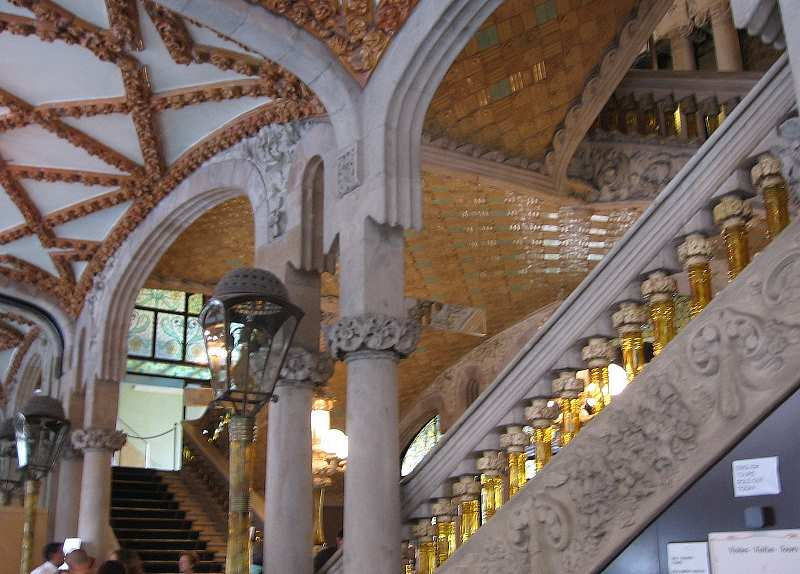
Vestibule and staircase

=== Lluís Millet hall ===
The Lluís Millet hall is a salon located on the second floor of the palace that is named after one of the founders of the Orfeó Català. The hall is a popular gathering place for concert-goers and also serves as a teaching area for visitors touring the building. From floor to ceiling the hall is two stories high and affords views of the intricate mosaics on the two rows of columns outside its windows that are much better than those available from the street.

It is ornated by several bronze busts of musicians related to the palace: Lluís Millet and Amadeu Vives (Orfeó Català founders), Pablo Casals, Eduard Toldrà (founder and first conductor of the Orquestra Municipal de Barcelona), Just Cabot (Orfeó Català president) and pianist Rosa Sabater.

=== Concert hall ===
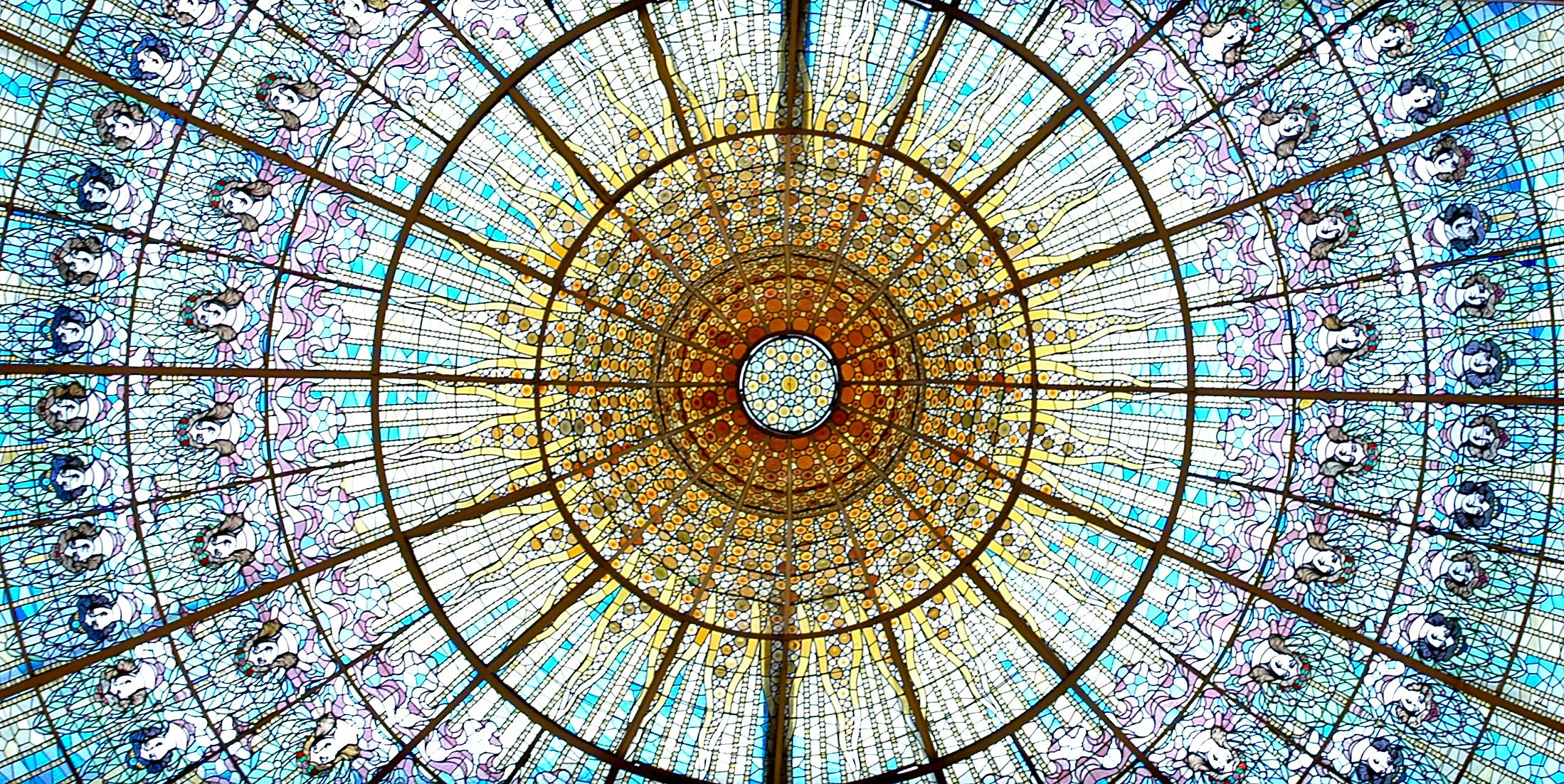
Stained-glass skylight

The concert hall is one of the most beautiful in the world (...) without exaggeration. It is one of its most important architectural treasures. Its pace, simple, complex, mystical and paradoxical, defies accurate description.

-David Mackay
(Quoted in Carandell et al. 2006, 62)

The concert hall of the palace, which seats about 2,200 people, is the only auditorium in Europe illuminated entirely by natural light during the day. The walls on two sides consist primarily of arched stained-glass panes and an overhead stained glass skylight, designed by Antoni Rigalt, whose centerpiece is an inverted dome in shades of gold surrounded by blue, representing the sun and the sky.

The architectural decoration in the concert hall is notable for its creativity and imagination, yet has been carefully designed for its purpose in the presentation of music. The hall is not a theatre, because the massive sculptures flanking the stage make the use of scenery nearly impossible. Likewise, even though a noble pipe organ graces the apse-like area above and behind the stage, the hall is not a church.

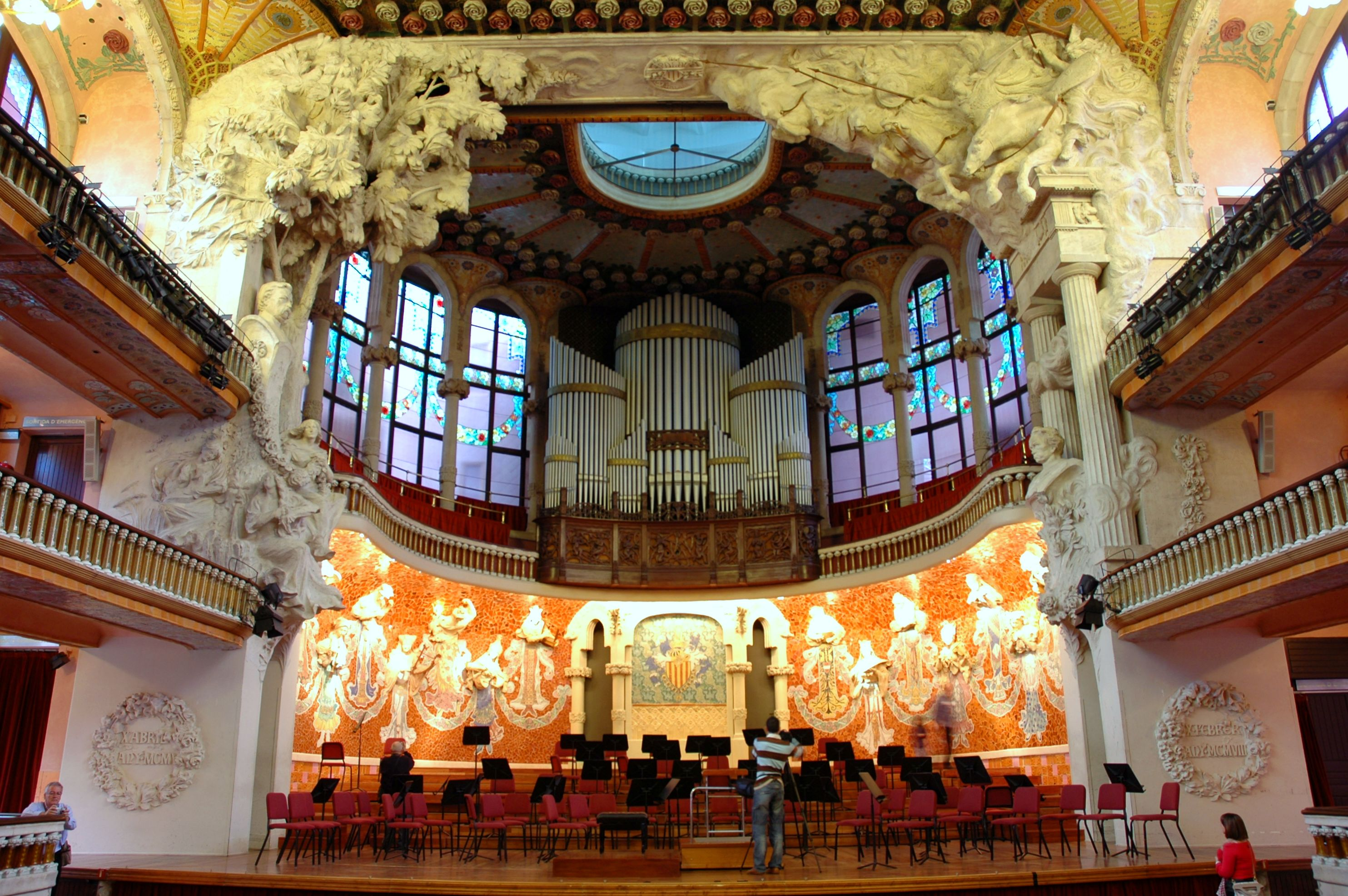
Stage with the muses in the background

The dominant theme in the sumptuous sculptural decor of the concert hall is choral music, something that might be expected in an auditorium commissioned by a choral society. A choir of young women surrounds the "sun" in the stained-glass skylight, and a bust of Anselm Clavé, a famous choir director who was instrumental in reviving Catalan folk songs, is situated on the left side of the stage, under a stone tree. Seated beneath this statue are sculpted girls singing the Catalan song Les Flors de Maig (The Flowers of May).

The whole arch over the front of the stage was sculpted by Dídac Masana and Pablo Gargallo. On the right side is depicted the 'Ride of the Valkyries' from Wagner's opera Die Walküre. Under the Valkyries and among two Doric columns is a bust of Beethoven. The arch thus represents folk music on the left and classical music on the right, both united at the top of the arch.

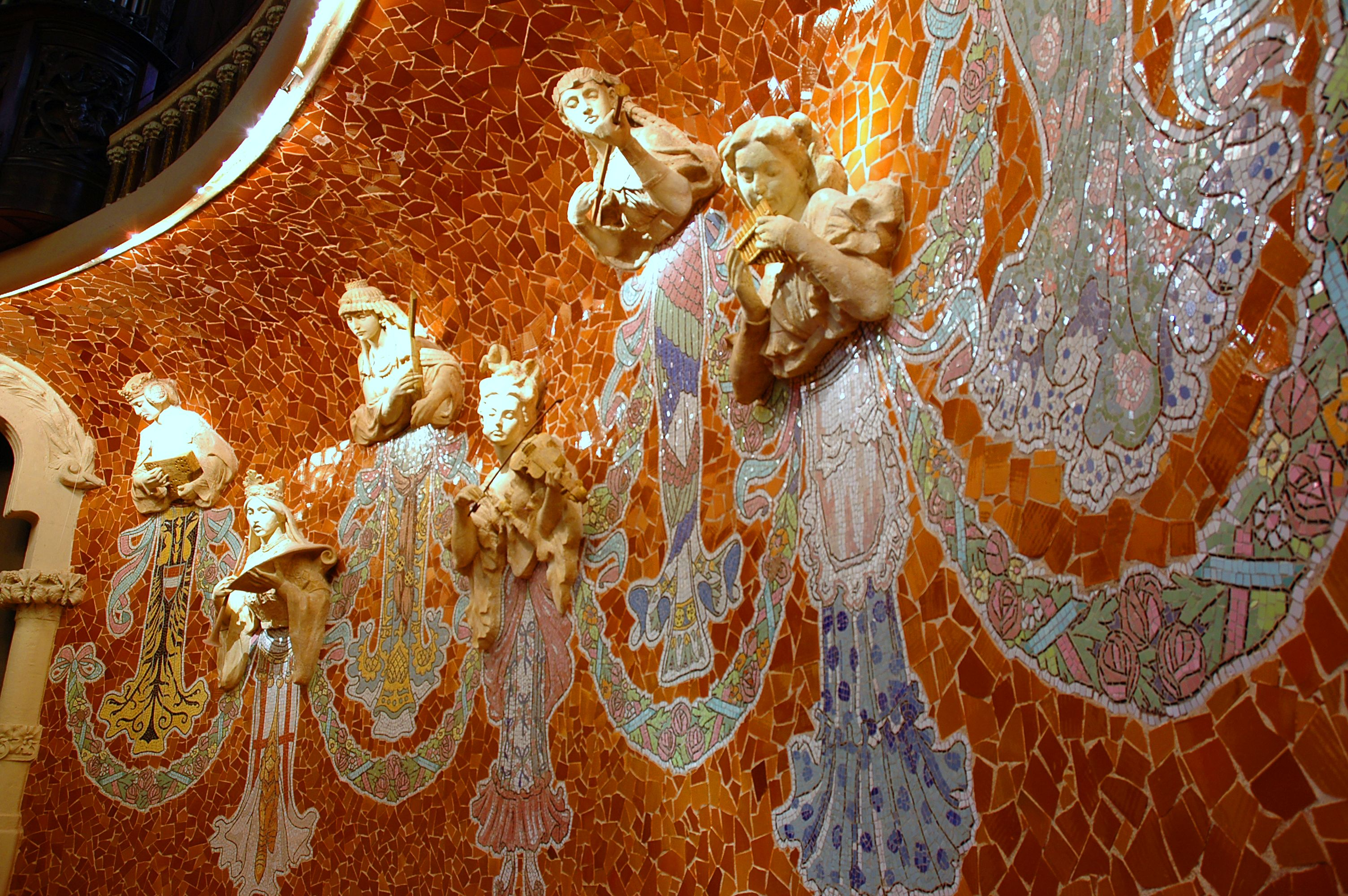
The muses on the right side, with one showing the coat of arms of Austria and double-headed eagle

In a semicircle on the sides of the back of the stage are the figures of 18 young women popularly known as the 'muses'. The upper bodies were sculpted by Eusebi Arnau and the mosaic work of their lower bodies was created by Lluís Bru. The monotone upper bodies of the women protrude from the wall and their lower bodies are depicted by colorful mosaics that form part of the wall. Each of the women is playing a different musical instrument, and each is wearing a different skirt, blouse, and headdress of elaborate design. In the middle between the two groups is a mosaic of the coat of arms of Catalonia. The muse to the right of the Catalan coat of arms is the only one that depicts on her dress the coat of arms of Austria and double-headed eagle of the Spanish Habsburgs dynasty.

The sculptures of winged horses that enjoy a commanding position in the upper balcony are in honour of Pegasus, the horse of Greek mythology and the symbol of high-flying imagination.

In each of the vaults between the pillars and the glass walls, there is a white tile medallion, bordered with laurel green leaves, with the names of notable musicians. To the left of the stage, starting from it: Palestrina, J. S. Bach, Carissimi, Beethoven and Chopin; to the right: Victoria, Handel, Mozart, Gluck and Wagner. On the wall between the ceilings of the main room and that of the back of the second floor of the same room, there are four more ceramic medallions, which synthesize the history of Catalan music: Joan Brudieu, Mateu Fletxa el Vell, Anselm Viola i Valentí, Domènec Terradellas and Josep Anselm Clavé.

Robert Hughes has noted how the non-soundproof glass walls of the palace impact the acoustics of the hall:

"...there was never a shortage of complaint about its acoustic conditions - which, since its glass walls carry music like drum skins, have always been awful."

== Remodeling and extension ==
Between 1982 and 1989 parts of the building were restored to their original state, technically upgraded and expanded to allow additional uses. The new work did not compromise the decorative or structural integrity of the original building. Stone, brick, iron, glass, and ceramics were used in the same way that Domènech i Montaner used them. One of the most important expansions is the adjoining building of six stories that houses dressing rooms, a library, and an archive.

From 2006 to 2008, further restoration was carried out: the lantern on the top of the tower on the corner of the building was reinstalled, as were some ornamental features of the façade.

=== Petit Palau ===
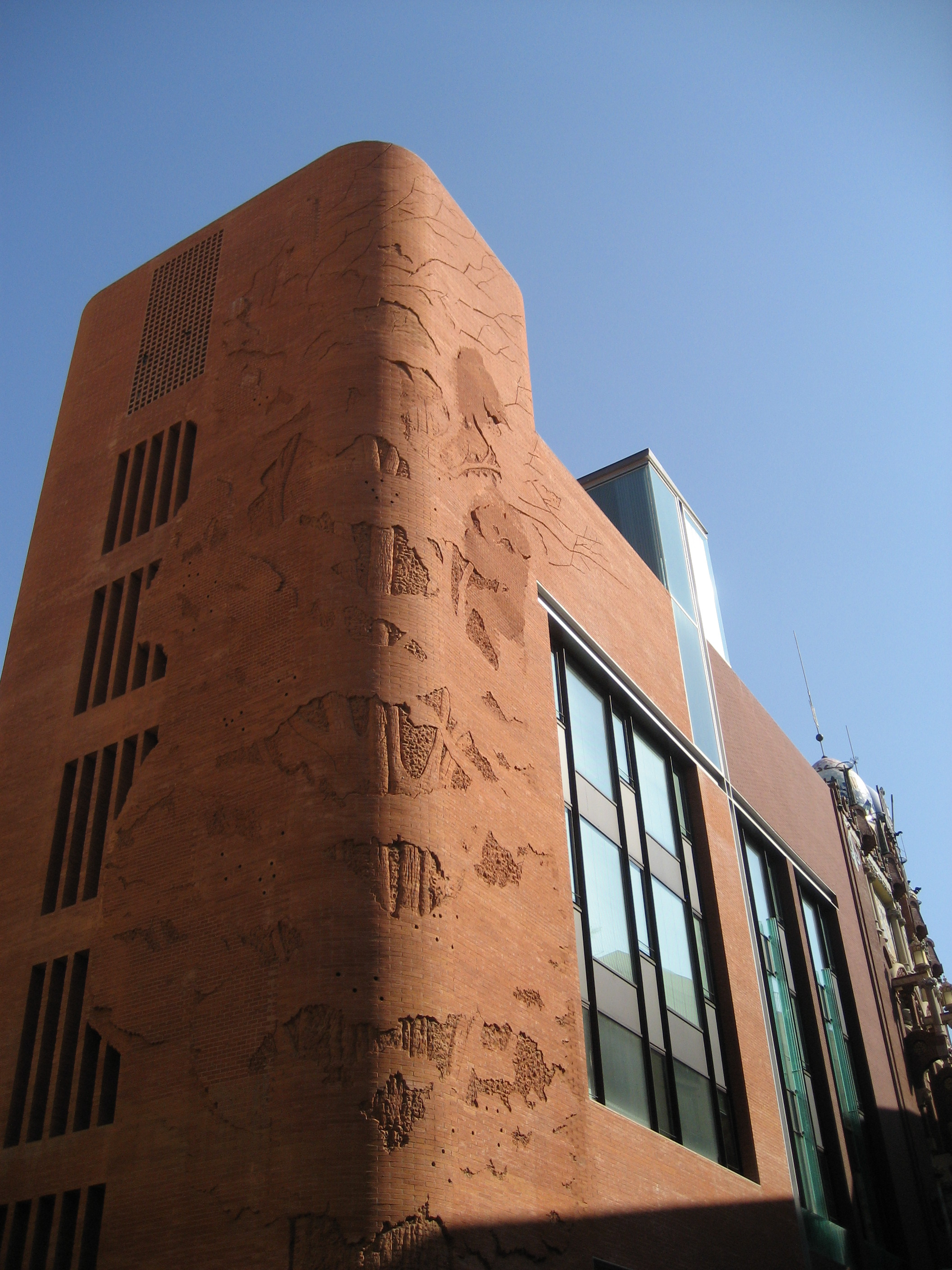
The new six-story tower, projected by Oscar Tusquets and officially opened in 1989, houses dressing rooms, a library, and archives.

Opened in 2004, the Petit Palau ("small palace") is 11 metres below the square that was created in the work of 1982-1989 between the palace and the neighbouring church. It has a seating capacity of 538 people and is equipped with variable acoustics for different types of music and spoken word. It also possesses the latest in audiovisual technology. Like the other additions, it was designed in the spirit of Domènech i Montaner. It is light and transparent like the palace proper, but at the same time it is modern in its great flexibility for different cultural, social, and business uses.

=== Appearances in film ===
On 7 September 2018, the palace appeared in BBC TV's Release Date trailer for Season 11 of Doctor Who. The trailer shows Jodie Whittaker, as the first female Doctor, literally 'shattering the glass ceiling' of the palace's striking skylight.

== Artistic history ==
From the opening of the palace in 1908 special attention was given to the promotion of local composers and artists. After World War I the Orquestra Pau Casals performed at the palace, and among composers featured gave presentations of the music of Enrique Granados from 1921 onwards. Pablo Casals and Alicia de Larrocha are among the many soloists and singers who have performed there.

=== Premières performed ===
As the main concert hall in the city, the palace has staged many world premières of musical compositions, including the following

- 1908 Enric Granados' symphonic poem Dante.
- 1911 Enric Granados' first book of his piano suite Goyescas and his Allegro de concierto and Cant de les estrelles (Song of the stars), for chorus and orchestra; Isaac Albéniz's Azulejos, prelude for piano finished by Enric Granados.
- 1914 Enric Granados' Tonadillas en estilo antiguo, song cycle for voice and piano.
- 1921 Eduard Toldrà's string quartett Vistes al mar (Sight to the sea) (31 May).
- 1923 Joaquín Turina's Tres arias for soprano and piano.
- 1925 Manuel de Falla's Psyché, and Frederic Mompou's Charmes, núm. 4-6.
- 1926 Jaume Pahissa's Suite intertonal (October 26); Joaquín Turina's Dos canciones (October 29) for soprano and piano; Manuel de Falla's Harpsichord Concerto (November 5).
- 1928 Eduard Toldrà's opera El giravolt de maig (The May sunflower); Frederic Mompou's Comptines, three songs for voice and piano; Joaquín Turina's Ritmos: fantasia coreográfica for orchestra (Rhythms: a choreographic fantasy) (October 23), and Evocaciones for piano (October 29).
- 1929 Roberto Gerhard's Concertino for strings, Wind quintet, and other of the author's early works.
- 1932 Manuel Blancafor]'s El rapte de les sabines (The Sabine women abduction) (other Blancafort's works were premiered here after: Ermita i panorama (Hermit and panorame) (1946), Concert omaggio a Franz Liszt (1944), Concert ibèric (Iberian concerto) (1950), Simfonia en mi (1951), Cantata Verge Maria (Virgin Mary cantata) (1968), Rapsòdia catalana (Catalan rhapsody) (1972), etc.)
- 1936 Alban Berg's Violin concerto (April 19); Roberto Gerhard's suite from the ballet Ariel.
- 1938 Roberto Gerhard's Albada, interludi i dansa (Sunrise, interlude and dance) (May 14)
- 1940 Joaquín Rodrigo's Concierto de Aranjuez (November 9).
- 1945 Xavier Montsalvatge's Cinco canciones negras (only the four first songs; the first performance of the five songs was given a few months after at the Ateneu Barcelonès); many other of the Montsalvatge's works have had their premieres at the palace.
- 1946 Joaquín Rodrigo's Quatre cançons en llengua catalana (Four songs in Catalan language). and Tríptic de Mossèn Cinto (Jacint Verdaguer's triptych), both song cycles for soprano and orchestra.
- 1948 Xavier Montsalvatge's Simfonia mediterrània (Mediterranean Symphony).
- 1952 Frederic Mompou's Cantar del alma, choral version.
- 1954 Salvador Bacarisse's 3rd Piano Concerto.
- 1957 Salvador Espriu's play Primera història d'Esther.
- 1959 Joaquín Nin-Culmell's ballet Don Juan.
- 1960 Xavier Montsalvatge's Càntic espiritual.
- 1961 Frederic Mompou's Variacions sobre un tema de Chopin for orchestra; Joan Brossa's play Or i sal.
- 1963 Xavier Montsalvatge's Desintegració morfològica de la xacona de J. S. Bach (Morphological disintegration of J.S. Bach's chaconne); Josep Carner's play El Ben Cofat i l'altre.
- 1966 Joaquin Homs' String quartet no. 6; other of Homs's works have had their premieres at the palace: Invention for orchestra (1965), Presències for orchestra (1970), Dos soliloquis (1976), Brief symphony (1978), Nonet (1979).
- 1967 Cristòfol Taltabull's oratorio La Passió (Passion).
- 1971 Krzystof Penderecki's Prélude for winds, percussion and double basses.
- 1974 Josep Soler's opera-oratorio Oedipus et Iocasta (many of Soler's works were first performed at the palace); Cristóbal Halffter's Oración a Platero for choir and orchestra.
- 1977 Joaquín Rodrigo's Sonata a la breve, for cello and piano.
- 2017 Guido Lopez-Gavilan's Una Cancion de Amor (24 July), for choir (commissioned by the IFCM for the Ansan City Choir, on the occasion of the 11th World Symposium on Choral Music); Xavier Pages-Corella's Audito e un Canto (24 July), for choir (commissioned by the IFCM for The Rose Ensemble, on occasion of the 11th World Symposium on Choral Music); Jaakko Mantyjarvi's Juliet November Tango (27 July), for choir (commissioned by the IFCM for Elektra Women's Choir, on occasion of the 11th World Symposium on Choral Music).

== See also ==
- List of theatres and concert halls in Barcelona
- List of Modernista buildings in Barcelona
- List of concert halls
