= Catalan autonomist campaign of 1918–1919 =

Catalan campaign for the autonomy of the Commonwealth of Catalonia

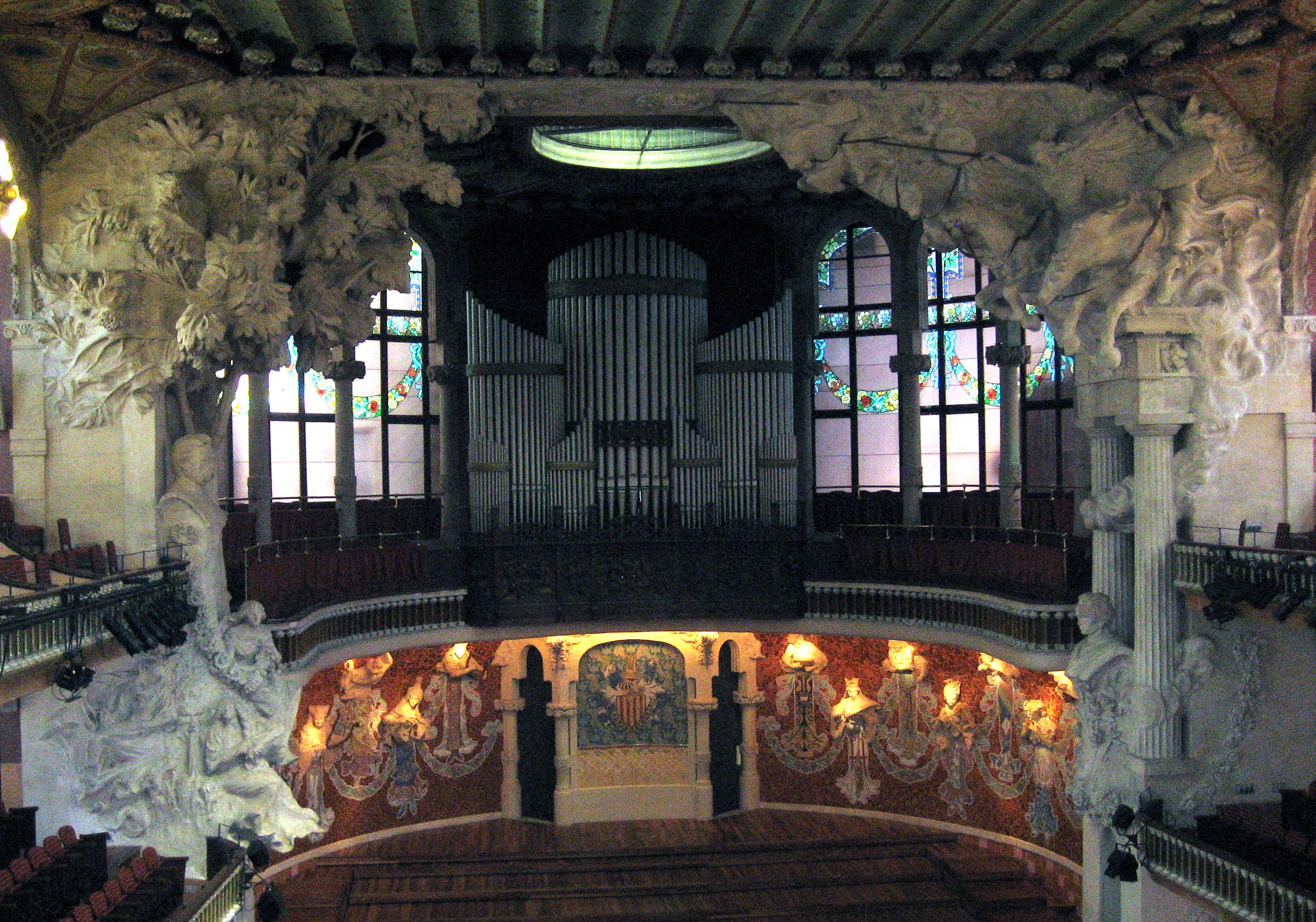
Stage of the Concert Hall of the Palau de la Música Catalana where on January 27, 1919, the mayors and delegates of the Catalan city councils ratified the draft statute of the Commonwealth of Catalonia.

The Catalan autonomist campaign of 1918–1919 was the first Catalanist movement in favor of the granting by the Spanish parliament of a Statute of Autonomy for Catalonia. It took place between November 1918 and February 1919, during the constitutional period of the reign of Alfonso XIII and in the context of the Restoration crisis. It was promoted by the Commonwealth of Catalonia —with the support of the hegemonic Regionalist League and the Catalan Republican nationalist parties— which presented a draft of bases for the autonomy of Catalonia to the government and the Cortes in Madrid at the end of November 1918. The attempt was a more moderate proposal compared to earlier and later radically separatist movements.

The proposal was rejected in December, amid a strong anti-Catalanist campaign promoted by the Castilian deputations that made public a Message from Castile. In January 1919, at the same time that an extra-parliamentary commission appointed by the government of the Count of Romanones was dealing with the issue, a commission appointed by the Commonwealth elaborated the first draft statute of autonomy in Catalan history, which was again rejected. The resurgence of the years of lead in Barcelona in February relegated the autonomist demand to the background. The campaign for the "integral autonomy" of Catalonia, as historian Javier Moreno Luzón has emphasized, "shook the Spanish political scene to its foundations."

== "Per Catalunya i l'Espanya Gran" ==
=== Background ===
We, from this Catalonia... systematically eliminated from any active intervention in the government of Spain, we, treated as separatists and localists, we to the other Spaniards of good faith, to those who feel their souls oppressed by the current impotence and wish to elevate their land to a greater internal and international dignity, we point out the obstacle: this enervating, exhausting struggle, unconscious at times, well aware now, between a predominant nationality and others that do not resign themselves to disappear; and we invite you to close this period, to harmoniously unite the Spanish nationalities with one another and all with the State, in such a way that each one freely governs its internal life and all have the participation that corresponds to their importance in the direction of the community, making Spain, in this way, not the sum of a people and the spoils of other peoples, but the living, powerful resultant of all the Spanish nations, whole, as God has made them, without mutilating them first, tearing from them the language, the culture, the personality, which are the root of their strength. [...] Do not have any illusions in Madrid; the question of Catalonia will not be solved with violence, nor with KulturKampf, nor with betrayals of former patriots, nor with the political skills of rulers who are masters at winning elections by imprisoning opposing voters and distributing favors and threats in violation of all laws. The only solution is a frank and complete autonomy. To establish it, to go to the federative consecration of the freedom of all the peninsular nations, is to begin the great Spain. To follow the path taken is to work for a weak Spain, more divided, more diminished every day.

— Manifesto Per Catalunya i l'Espanya gran, 1916.

In March 1916, the Regionalist League published the manifesto Per Catalunya i l'Espanya Gran, written by Prat de la Riba —who would die the following year— and signed by all the deputies and senators of the party. The manifesto denounced that Catalonia was one of the peoples of Spain who saw "the substantial elements of their spirituality, of their personality, excluded from the laws of the State", which made them "third-class Spaniards". The solution was the recognition of the autonomy of Catalonia, "a work of justice" and "of the highest convenience" and to put an end to the assimilationist policy, which would make possible the authentic unity "of all Spaniards, whole, just as God has made them", converted into a "peninsular empire of Iberia" —which also implied the integration of Portugal—.

The first attempt to carry out this program took place the following year in the context of the 1917 crisis. On July 5, Francesc Cambó gathered all the Catalan deputies and senators at the City Council of Barcelona —although the 13 monarchist deputies left the meeting immediately— who reaffirmed the will of Catalonia to become an autonomous region. In the declaration they approved, signed even by Alejandro Lerroux, it was stated "that it is the general will of Catalonia to obtain a regime of broad autonomy" and a federal structure was demanded in accordance with "the reality of Spanish life", which would increase "its organic cohesion" and develop "its collective energies". They also demanded the reopening of the Cortes, which would have the function of constituent assembly. If the Dato government did not accept any of the requests, they would call on all the deputies and senators to attend an Assembly of Parliamentarians to be held on July 19 in Barcelona.

The government of the conservative Eduardo Dato tried to discredit the call by presenting the meeting as a "separatist" and "revolutionary" movement and finally only the deputies of the League, the Republicans, the reformists of Melquíades Álvarez and the socialist Pablo Iglesias went to Barcelona, who approved the formation of a government "which embodied and represented the sovereign will of the country" and which would preside over the elections to the Constituent Courts. The Assembly was dissolved by order of the civil governor of Barcelona and all the participants were arrested by the police, although as soon as they left the Palace of the Pac de la Ciutadella where they had met they were released. After the general revolutionary strike of August called by the socialists, the Assembly of Parliamentarians met again on October 30 at the Ateneo in Madrid. That same day Cambó was called to the Palace to meet with the king, who accepted his proposal to form a "concentration government" which would be presided over by the liberal Manuel García Prieto and which would include a minister from the League, Joan Ventosa. However, García Prieto's government lasted only a few months, giving way to another concentration government, called the "National Government", under the presidency of the conservative Antonio Maura, and of which Francesc Cambó himself would form part. But this government only lasted until November 1918, giving way to a purely liberal one presided over again by García Prieto.

When the assembly of parliamentarians and the concentration governments failed to achieve the objectives of the manifesto Per Catalunya i l'Espanya Gran, Cambó decided that "Catalonia's time had come" and the Regionalist League organized the campaign for "integral autonomy" for Catalonia which, according to Javier Moreno Luzón, "shook the Spanish political scene to its foundations".

== Beginning of the campaign for "integral autonomy" ==
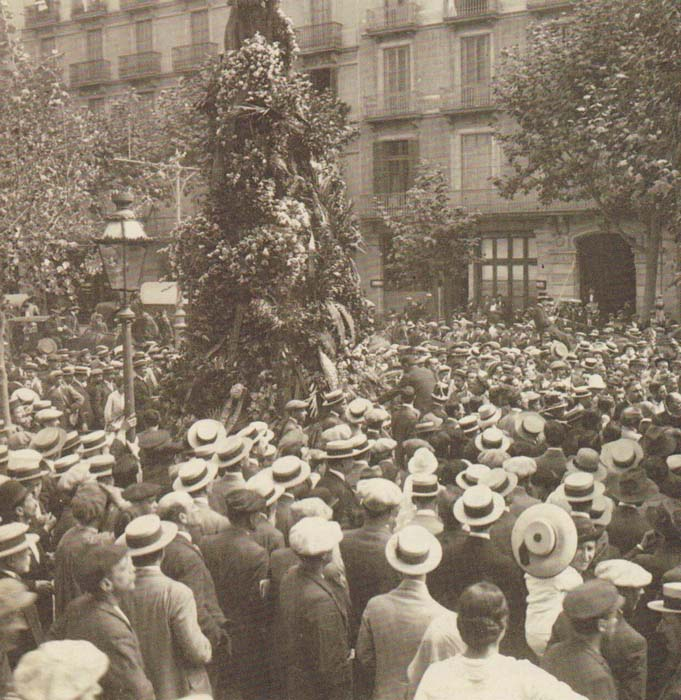
Homage to Rafael Casanova on the 1914 Diada.

In July 1918, the IV Municipal Week was held in Barcelona, in which the mayors and councilors of Catalonia participated, as well as the town hall secretaries. The organizing entity of the Week, the Escola de Funcionaris de l'Administració Local, decided to call a Plebiscit de la voluntat municipal de Catalunya in which the city councils had to pronounce on the autonomy of Catalonia "so that it could fully develop all its energies, and reach the place that belongs to it, fulfilling its mission in the resurgence of Spain". It had the precedent of the municipal plebiscite held in 1913 in favor of the creation of the Commonwealth of Catalonia.

At the beginning of November 1918, on the occasion of the end of the First World War, several allied and hostile demonstrations to the monarchy were held in Barcelona, together with rallies called by radical Catalan nationalist groups. In this context, on November 5, Francesc Macià made a resounding speech in favor of the independence of Catalonia in the Congress of Deputies, which emptied as soon as he began to speak. On November 10, when the news of the abdication of the German Kaiser spread, Francesc Layret asked the Commonwealth to call an assembly of town councils to request the League of Nations to intervene in favor of Catalonia. Four days later, the Partit Republicà Català deputies Marcel-lí Domingo, Salvador Albert and Julià Nougués, supported by three other republican deputies from other regions, presented a bill in the Cortes that read: "The Congress grants Catalonia full autonomy".

On November 15 Francesc Cambó had an interview with the king in the Royal Palace during which, according to Cambó's own testimony, Alfonso XIII encouraged him to launch the autonomist campaign in order to distract "the masses [of Catalonia] from any revolutionary purpose". "I see no other way to save such a difficult situation than to satisfy at once the aspirations of Catalonia, so that the Catalans stop feeling revolutionary at this moment and reinforce their adhesion to the Monarchy," the king told Cambó. According to the historian Javier Moreno Luzón, "Alfonso XIII was convinced that only the League, satisfied with some autonomic potion, could dissuade the masses and stop the imminent revolution in Barcelona, a transcript of the Russian or German ones". For Cambó, "Catalonia's time had come".

The following day, November 16, in a solemn act in which various economic, cultural and professional entities were represented, and which was also attended by the deputies and senators for Catalonia and the deputies of the four provincial deputations —while a crowd gathered in the Plaza de Sant Jaime—, the president of the organizing entity of the municipal plebiscite handed to the president of the Commonwealth of Catalonia Josep Puig i Cadafalch a volume with the certificates of the Catalan town councils, which had expressed themselves overwhelmingly in favor of the autonomy of Catalonia —practically all the municipalities, representing 98% of the Catalan population—. Puig i Cadafalch then met with the members of the Permanent Council of the Commonwealth and with the Catalan parliamentarians and proposed that a committee be formed to draw up a draft of the bases for Catalan autonomy, which would be presented to the government of the liberal Manuel García Prieto. Francesc Macià, however, left the meeting after saying that autonomy was insufficient and that what had to be achieved was independence.

On November 17, 1918, Macià gave a conference in the premises of the CADCI where he presented for the first time to the public the Catalan independence flag that he had just invented —and whose first appearance in the street had taken place the day before—: the Estelada, with a blue triangle and a white star. At the exit of the conference a demonstration was formed on the Ramblas, the first of the autonomist campaign, which was dissolved by the police. Later, when the demonstrators went to the Serbian consulate so that Macià could congratulate the consul for his victory in the war, a group of Carlist requetés appeared and began to give cheers to Spain, which were answered with cheers to Catalunya lliure, producing a serious altercation in which the police had to intervene again.

The CNT, the hegemonic workers' organization in Catalonia, did not join the autonomist campaign, but that did not mean that it defended centralism. On December 18, the official newspaper of the organization in Catalonia, Solidaridad Obrera, directed at that time by Ángel Pestaña, published an article with the significant title "Ni con unos ni con otros" (in English: Neither with one or the other). It said: "In the problem of the autonomy of Catalonia [...] we cannot be with either one or the other [...] All the workers of Spain should know that the movement for autonomy carried out by the plutocrats of the League does not have the acquiescence nor the sympathy of the workers of Catalonia [...] We are not interested in the autonomy dispute, except for the protest of the people in the street. That protest, which can be translated into mutiny and that mutiny which can lead to a liberating revolution, yes, because it reflects the uneasiness of the people and the anxieties they feel to get out of this state [...] as far as it means revolt, crystallization and revolutionary events we accept it [...] we will remain on the sidelines, but in expectation". The Catalan leader of the CNT Salvador Seguí said in a meeting held on January 12, a few days before he was arrested by the police taking advantage of the suspension of constitutional guarantees decreed by the Romanones government.

We do not want Catalonia to be a colony like those that the manufacturers of Barcelona have, to which their workers are enslaved. We want Catalonia to be a free, conscious and well administered nation. We are more Catalan than those who boast so much of Catalanism. Nor do we want to play into the hands of the central power, since the latter is only waiting for the occasion when the men of autonomy are impotent or for any other reason, to deny its concession, on the pretext that they cannot dominate nor know how to govern the diverse elements that make up Catalonia.

The committee appointed by the Commonwealth prepared the draft of the bases in just a few days. This was maximalist in that it only specified the competences that corresponded to the State, leaving the rest for Catalonia, which meant, as historian Albert Balcells has pointed out, starting from the idea of "a virtually sovereign Catalonia that pacts on equal terms with the Spanish State, a situation only plausible in the case of a constituent process that would entail a federalization of Spain, but inadequate in the case of a demand for a singular autonomy for Catalonia without constitutional reform; what was needed was the opposite: to establish the competences that the State ceded to Catalonia", which was the approach that the Regionalist League leader Francesc Cambó had defended from the beginning.

On November 25, the Catalan parliamentarians approved the draft of the bases, making it clear, at Cambó's proposal, that it was not a draft statute since "the honor of whose initiative corresponded to the Government", and that it had only outlined "the general lines that... could serve as a guideline for the Government, and as a norm for the future Constitution that the Catalan people would give itself". On November 29 the president of the Commonwealth Puig i Cadafalch, accompanied by the Consell and the Catalan parliamentarians, delivered in Madrid the project of bases for the autonomy of Catalonia to the president of the government García Prieto, who received it very coldly. That same afternoon Cambó gave a conference at the Royal Academy of Jurisprudence in which he defended the project, insisting on the idea that the autonomy of Catalonia did not imply the dismemberment of Spain.

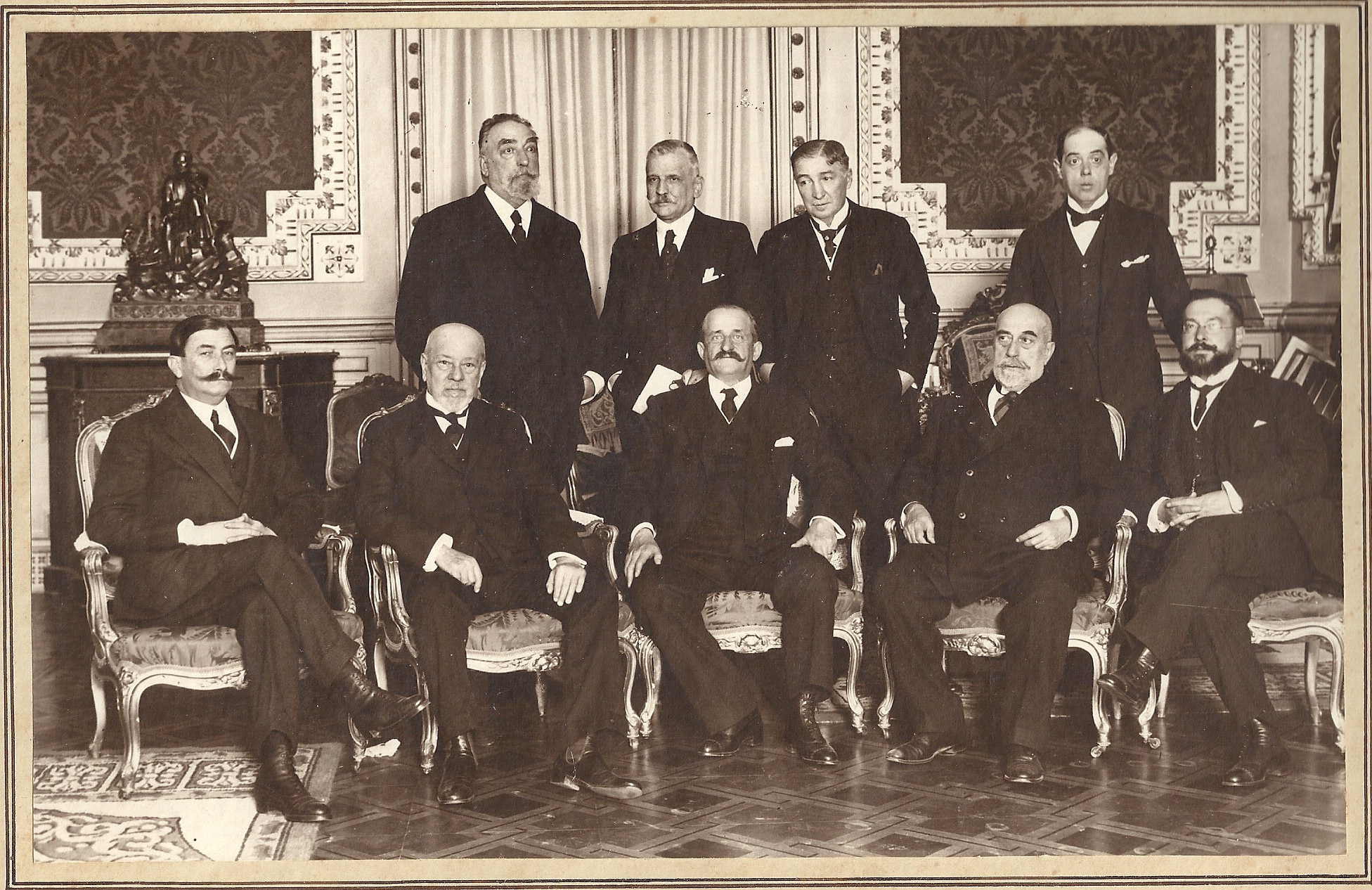
Government presided by the Count of Romanones, seated in the center.

The draft of the bases divided the government between those in favor of negotiating, led by the Count of Romanones, and those in favor of delaying the request, led by President García Prieto and Santiago Alba. The disagreement prevented the continuity of the government and García Prieto resigned —his government had lasted less than a month—. The king then entrusted the formation of the government to the Count of Romanones, the liberal leader who had defended the need to reach an agreement, although he only had the support of the deputies of his own faction. As the historian Ángeles Barrio has pointed out, the main mission of the new government was "to steer the question of autonomy through smoother channels".

=== Reaction of Spanish nationalism ===
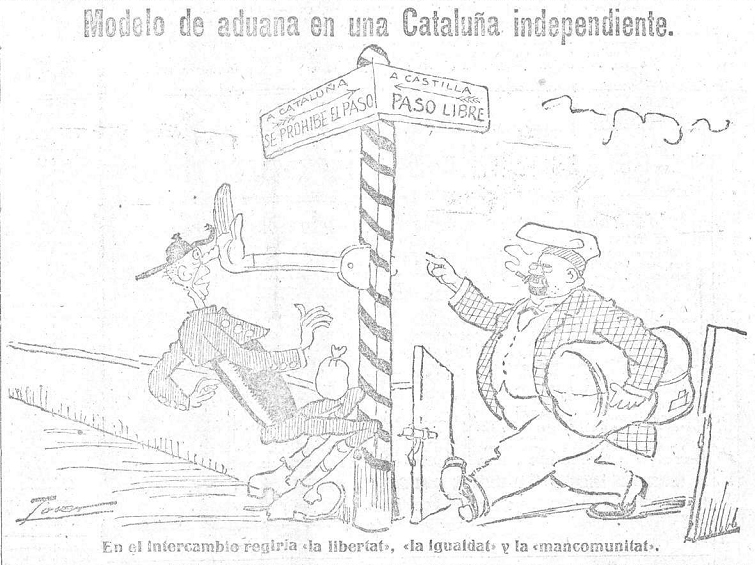
Caricature published in Heraldo de Madrid on December 2, 1918, by Tovar, entitled "Modelo de aduana en una Cataluña independiente." (in English: "Model of customs in an independent Catalonia.").

The mere possibility of the granting of a Statute of Autonomy for Catalonia provoked the immediate reaction of Spanish nationalism, which deployed a strong anti-Catalanist campaign based on clichés and stereotypes about Catalonia and the Catalans, but which managed to mobilize thousands of people who protested in Madrid and other cities. The campaign was initiated by the so-called trust of the liberal press of Madrid formed by the newspapers El Liberal, El Heraldo de Madrid and El Imparcial, which was soon joined by the conservative daily ABC, the newspaper with the largest circulation in Spain. Various employers' organizations, some of them linked to the liberal sector headed by Santiago Alba, called for a large demonstration in Madrid, accompanied by the closure of stores, which brought together more than 100,000 people and had an enormous impact on public opinion —the newspaper El Imparcial headlined on its front page: "Madrid's protest against the separatism of the Catalans of the League"—. The campaign also included the boycott of Catalan products, as would happen in 1932 when the Cortes of the Second Spanish Republic debated the draft Statute of Autonomy of Catalonia.

On December 2, 1918, one day after the Romanones government was formed, the deputations of Castilla y León —Santander, Valladolid, Palencia, Soria, Segovia, Avila, Salamanca, Logroño and Madrid—, gathered in Burgos, responded to Catalan pretensions with the Message of Castile, in which they defended "national unity" and opposed any region obtaining political autonomy that would undermine Spanish sovereignty —and even called for a boycott of "the orders of the Catalan industrial houses"—. They also opposed the co-officiality of Catalan, which they called a "regional dialect". The following day, the newspaper El Norte de Castilla headlined: "Faced with the problem presented by Catalan nationalism, Castile affirms the Spanish nation". It also denounced "the separatist campaign displayed in the Basque provinces".

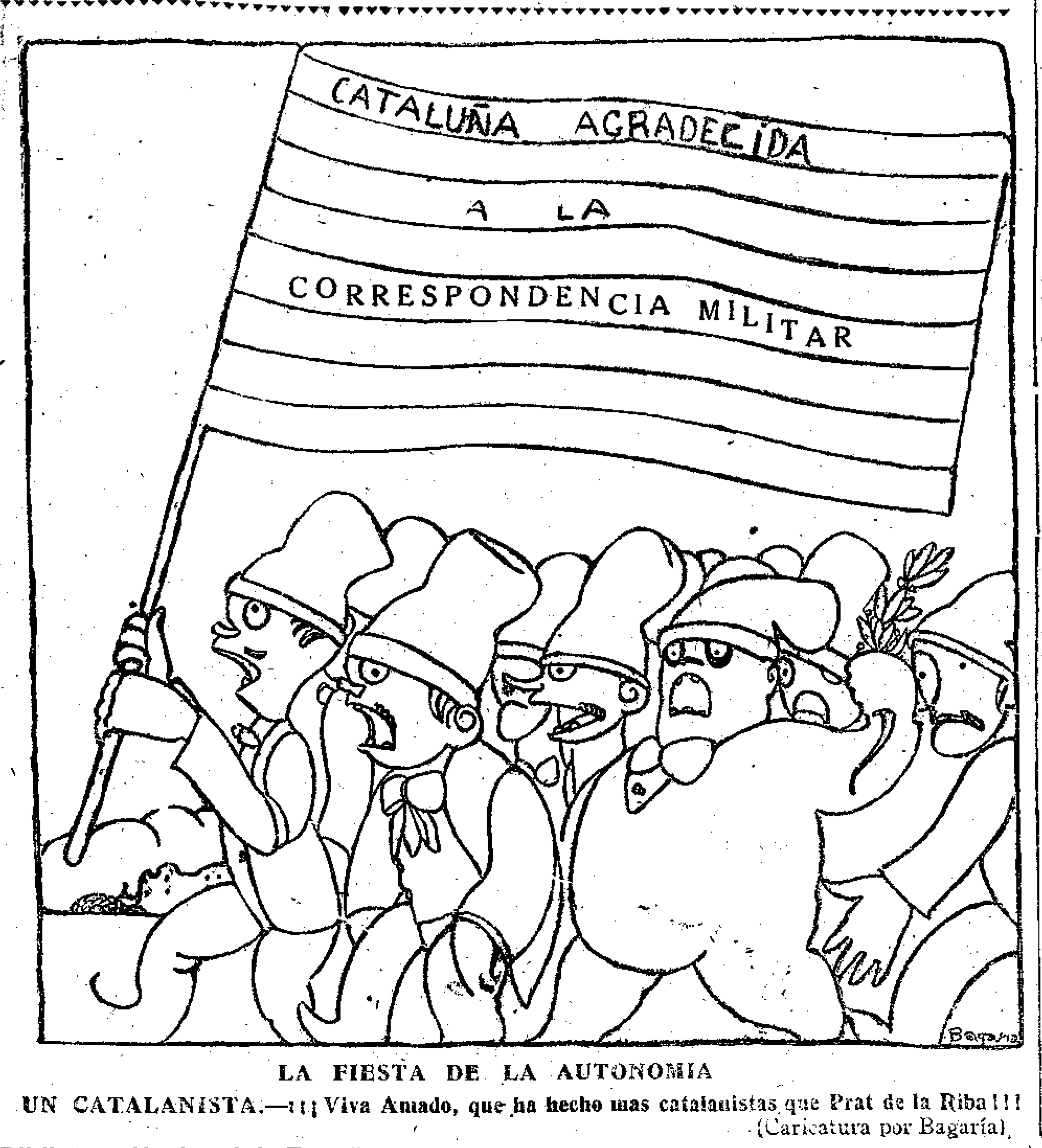
"Catalonia grateful to La Correspondencia Militar". "A catalanist — Long live Amado, who has made more catalanists than Prat de la Riba!!!".Caricature by Bagaría (El Sol, 1919).

The Andalusian deputations also manifested their opposition to Catalan autonomy, although the minority Andalusian regionalist group of Blas Infante sent a message of support to the president of the Commonwealth. For its part, the Diputación de Zaragoza demanded the Commonwealth for Aragón, but made it clear that its aspirations should not be confused with those of the Catalanists, since "Aragón has proclaimed above all the intangibility of the homeland". However, in Barcelona the Aragonese Regionalist Union was formed and organized an act of support for the Catalan autonomist campaign, in which the deputy for Zaragoza of the Radical Republican Party Manuel Marraco Ramón intervened and said that if Catalonia achieved autonomy it would favor Aragon.

The presidents of the Castilian deputations delivered on December 6 the manifesto against the autonomy of Catalonia to the president of the government Romanones and to the king. The latter, who days before had encouraged Cambó to present the Statute proposal, expressed his solidarity "with the patriotic gestures of the Castilian provinces" and encouraged the presidents of the deputations to continue in their efforts. On December 9, the day before the debate in the Congress of Deputies on the draft Statute, some one hundred thousand people marched through the streets of Madrid in defense of "the unity of Spain" and against the Catalan Statute.

=== Support of Basque nationalism ===
Unlike what happened in other parts of Spain, in the Basque Country and Navarre, the Catalan autonomist campaign found the support of Basque nationalism, which at that time was at its peak as it held the presidency of the Provincial Council of Biscay and the mayoralty of Bilbao. The Catalan aspirations connected with theirs and in fact the Basque nationalist deputies, anticipating the Catalans, had presented on November 8, 1918, in the Cortes a bill to achieve the foral reintegration —the abolition of the law of October 25, 1839 and the reestablishment of the Basque fueros— and the opening of a constituent period for Álava, Gipuzkoa, Biscay and Navarre. On December 15, the Assembly of the City Councils of Biscay met in the Bilbao City Hall, but this ended in a serious altercation between dynastics and socialists on one side and Basque nationalists on the other. A Basque nationalist demonstration later went through the streets of Bilbao, and the Maurist newspaper El Pueblo Vasco was assaulted. The response of the Romanones government was to dismiss the nationalist mayor of Bilbao, Mario Arana. On January 7, 1919, the two dynastic parties formed the Monarchist Action League to face the growth of Basque nationalism.

=== Attempt to internationalize the "Catalan lawsuit" ===
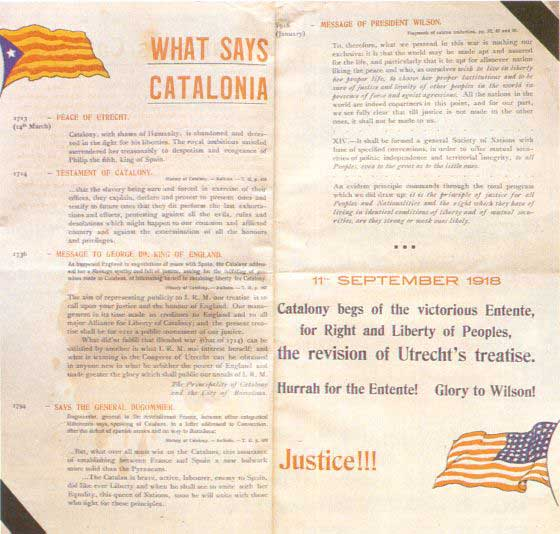
Document in English entitled "What says Catalonia" dated September 11, 1918 in which the Committee Pro Catalonia asks "the victorious Entente, for the Right and Freedom of Peoples, the revision of the Treaty of Utrecht. Long live the Entente! Glory to Wilson! Justice!!!". This is the oldest document in which the Estelada appears.

In July 1918, when the end of the "Great War" was near, the Committee Pro Catalonia was formed with people from the Unió Catalanista, chaired by the director of the magazine La Tralla, Vicenç Albert Ballester, inventor of the Estelada, the flag of the new Catalan nationalist independence movement. The objective of the committee was to internationalize the "Catalan dispute" for which it contacted the Catalan centers in America. The Regionalist League at first did not join this strategy of the radical Catalan nationalists, but its position began to change and in October the president of the Commonwealth Josep Puig i Cadafalch went to Perpignan to attend the act of homage to the French Marshal Joseph Joffre, who had been born in French Catalonia —Puig i Cadafalch invited the Marshal to come to Barcelona, a visit he made in May 1920 to preside over the Jocs Florals; on the other hand, the radical nationalist propaganda presented Marshal Joffre as a Catalan war hero—. Cambó went so far as to sound out the French government about a possible trip to Paris to defend the "Catalan cause" but the answer was negative, considering it an "internal Spanish problem".

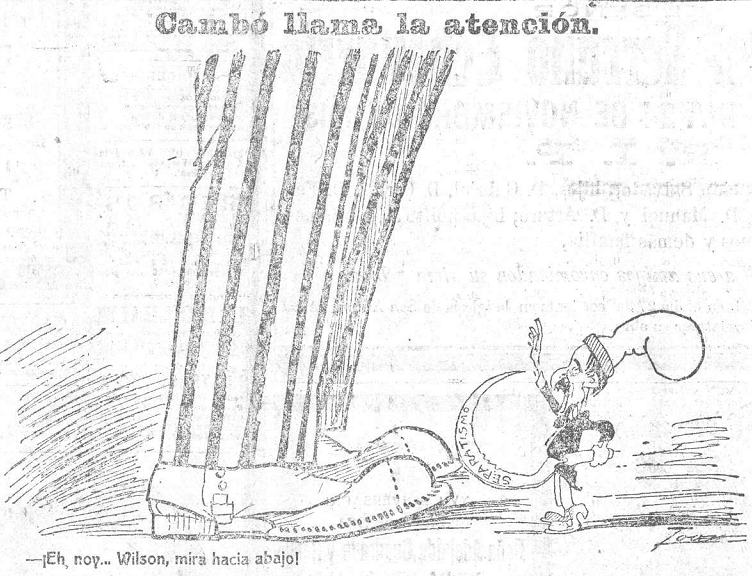
"Cambó draws attention", cartoon by Tovar in the newspaper Heraldo de Madrid, November 23, 1918.

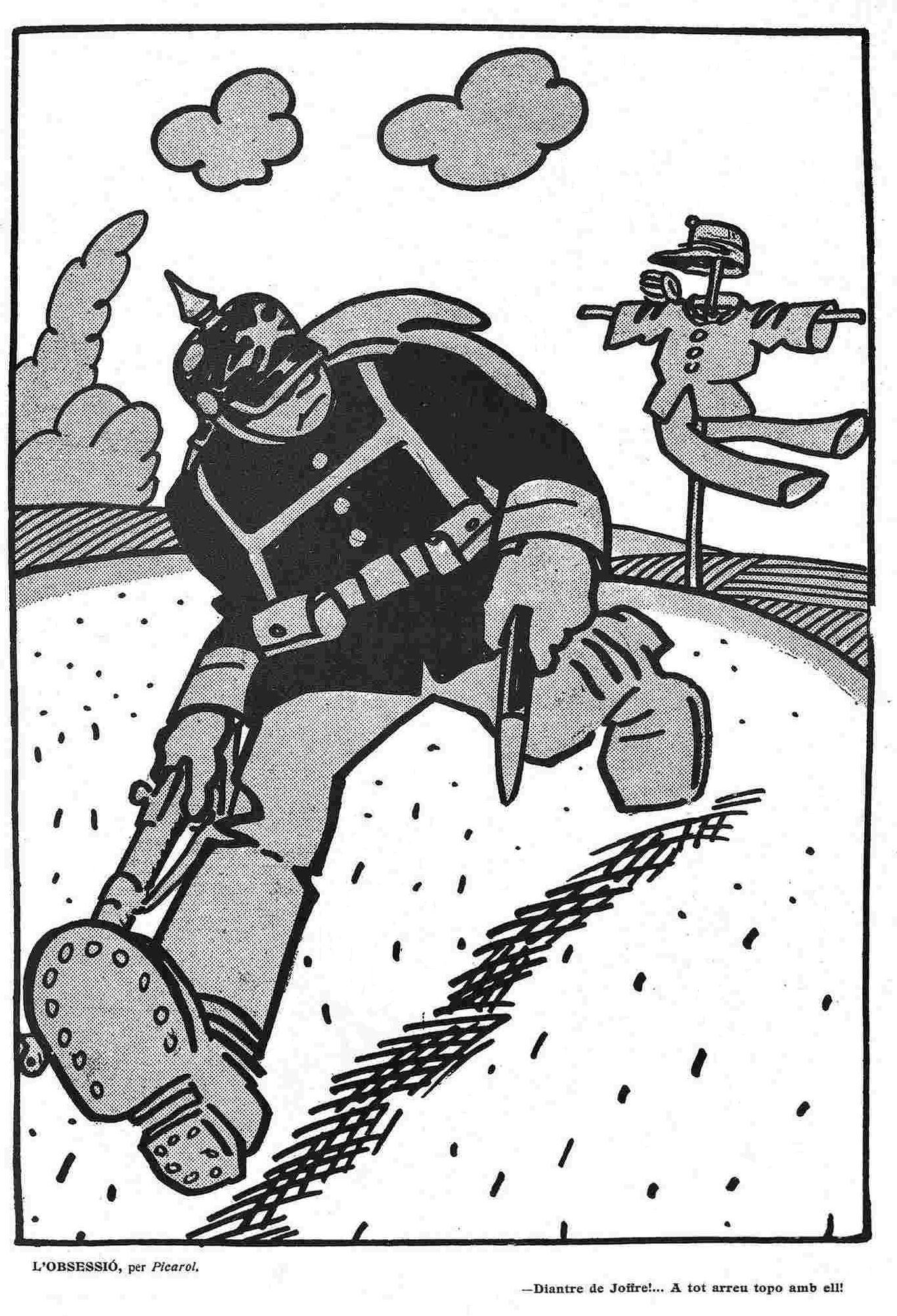
Cartoon from the Catalan satirical magazine L'Esquella de la Torratxa praising Marshal Joffre (1915). The German soldier who flees when he sees the scarecrow with the French uniform says: "Damn Joffre!.... Everywhere I run into him".

In December 1918, two months after the armistice that put an end to the First World War was signed, radical Catalan nationalists formed in Paris the self-styled "Catalan National Committee", which imitated the Czech National Committee, to demand that the victorious countries deal with the "Catalan lawsuit". In the name of the "Catalan Legion" —the Catalans who had enlisted in the French Foreign Legion to fight against the Central Empires, and who the nationalist propaganda put at twelve thousand, although today that number is considered to be greatly inflated—the Committee sent a letter to the North American president Woodrow Wilson in which they asked for "the revision of the ignominious Treaty of Utrecht and to allow the Catalan Nation, free and independent, to enter to occupy in the League of Nations the place that corresponds to it by its glorious past and by its present flourishing". There is no record that they received any response and the "Catalan dispute" was not included in the agenda of the Paris Conference. In fact, when in January 1919 the Committee intended to organize in Paris a tribute to the Catalan volunteers who had fought in the "Great War", the French government did not allow the Estelada to be displayed or to be used as an act of propaganda in favor of independence and forced the meeting to be presented as a tribute to the "Spanish volunteers".

Among other reasons, this was due to the efforts of the Count of Romanones, who went ahead of Cambó to find out to what extent Wilson's famous Fourteen Points could affect Spain. And the Count found himself with a message of reassurance from the President of the United States —and therefore from the rest of the allies— that the principles of those 14 points would only be imposed on the countries defeated in the conflict, not on the neutrals nor, evidently, on the victors. It must be taken into account that at that time almost the entire map of Europe was redrawn: the center (Germany), the north (Poland-Russia), the east (Balkans) and also the Middle East and the colonies in Africa and Asia, the last thing the victorious allies (who also had opposing interests in many geostrategic areas) wanted was to create another problem in the Iberian Peninsula. Therefore, the Count remained calm and Cambó had an unpleasant surprise when he found that the person he thought was going to be his main supporter —Wilson, president of the United States— simply ignored his proposals because he already had to negotiate more than a few issues throughout Europe.

== Debate in the Cortes on the Bases project and the withdrawal of the Catalan deputies ==
On December 10, 1918, the Congress of Deputies began the debate on the draft of the bases, which was defended by Francesc Cambó. In his speech he said that the definitive integration of the League into the political system of the Monarchy depended on the acceptance of the autonomy of Catalonia, without which the "greatness of Spain" was not possible, and that otherwise they would be "eliminated from general politics". He added that the granting of the Statute did not weaken the powers of the Spanish parliament because the latter could "repeal it and even... modify it", a statement, according to the historian Albert Balcells, "very risky" because "he had recognized something that denied the sovereignty of the Catalan autonomous power", although "the logic of Cambó's speech —just like that of the Bases presented— was federal and constituent, since it claimed in the areas of competence of the Catalan regional power a total, complete, absolute sovereignty".

The spokesman for the liberals and therefore for the government, Niceto Alcalá Zamora, spoke next and opposed the draft of the Bases, among other reasons, because it was incompatible with the Constitution of 1876 and because it granted Catalonia "tax privileges". He ended his speech by stating that if the Catalan nationalists wanted autonomy they should renounce their participation in the government of Spain. It was then that, addressing Cambó, he said: "You cannot be both Bolívar of Catalonia and Bismarck of Spain".

He was followed by the "albista" deputy Gascón y Marín who, after accusing the project of being "pancatalanist —a claim that Alcalá Zamora had also made— opposed the transfer of the competence over civil law because of its relation with social legislation and, above all, the transfer of teaching: "Do you think that we are not going to defend the teachers, who represent the unity of thought, the unity of Spain?

The following day, the expected intervention of the conservative leader Antonio Maura took place, who also opposed Catalan autonomy, although he allowed the possibility of negotiating an administrative decentralization that did not put at risk the autonomy of the municipalities "because the municipality has, not so much a right, but a more notorious and indisputable right to autonomy than the region, and the Nation needs municipal autonomy much more and much sooner than regional autonomy". Referring to the question of competences, he said that "the region has been delimited by demarcating the State" and to explain this he resorted to the following metaphor: "An eagle that has to serve as solace in a park for the idle can be caged, an eagle that has to defend its life and that of its children cannot have a feather taken from its wings or a nail removed from its claws". Then, addressing the Catalan deputies, he told them that, whether they liked it or not, they were Spanish: "No one can choose their mother, or brothers, or their father's house, or their hometown, or their homeland". His intervention was very applauded by the deputies of the two dynastic parties, including the president of the government, Count of Romanones.

After Maura's intervention, Cambó wrote a letter to the king on December 12 in which he terminated the secret agreement adopted a month earlier and in which he justified the withdrawal from the Cortes of the great majority of Catalan deputies and senators as a sign of protest against the rejection of the autonomy of Catalonia, a gesture that was very much disapproved by the dynastic parties. In the letter Cambó wrote:

The result of yesterday's session means the failure of all our actions in Spanish politics and the abandonment of all hope that the Catalan problem could have the solution in which I had placed all my illusions. A duty of political loyalty obliges me to proclaim it in Parliament before leaving for Catalonia. Believe V.M. that when writing these lines to you I am going through the most bitter trance of my life.

In Cambó's speech in the Congress of Deputies to explain the withdrawal of the parliamentarians, he thanked the republicans and socialists for the support they had given to the autonomy of Catalonia:

By great good fortune, you, men who represent currents of opinion that are not limited to a part of Spanish territory, have declared that in your sentiments the broadest political autonomy for Catalonia is compatible with the integrity, with the unity of Spain. Think of the immense responsibility that weighs on you as you are almost the only ones in general Spanish politics who maintain in your convictions and in your feelings this compatibility.

The following day, December 13, there were demonstrations in Barcelona in support of autonomy, harshly repressed by the police. In one of them an army lieutenant dressed in uniform arrested a demonstrator because he had shouted Visca Catalunya Lliure but the crowd prevented him from doing so and he was stripped of his saber and had to be rescued by the police. The incident was magnified by the military press of Madrid and caused great indignation among the officers of the garrison of Barcelona as the captain general of Catalonia Jaime Milans del Bosch immediately made known to the government of Romanones. For his part, the civil governor prohibited the pro-autonomist demonstrations. The measure prevented the organization of a large demonstration like the one that had been held in Madrid on December 9 against Catalan autonomy, but it was not an obstacle to the occurrence of attempted demonstrations led by radical nationalist groups that ended in serious clashes with the police.

On December 14, the deputies and senators who had left the Cortes and were returning from Madrid were received in Barcelona with full honors. Then a manifestation went through the main streets of Barcelona without the police intervening. Some participants stoned the headquarters of La Vanguardia, which had criticized the withdrawal of the parliamentarians, and burned copies of the newspaper in the street. It was at that moment that the police finally intervened. The following day the Republicans organized a rally in a theater in Barcelona in favor of Catalan autonomy. At the exit another demonstration was organized and the police without warning shot at the demonstrators, killing a woman who was passing by. She was the first victim of three during the autonomy campaign. No policeman was arrested or punished for these events.

On December 18, Cambó launched at a rally the slogan "Monarchy? Republic? Catalonia!". "We do not mortgage autonomy to the Republic, nor do we wait for the Republic to implement autonomy, but we will not slow down our march because of the fact that the Monarchy may fall, We have love and adhesion to Catalonia and autonomy. We do not choose our enemies, they themselves will say against whom Catalonia has to go", he declared. Cambó wrote to a journalist: "I will not enter into any government in which I cannot fully develop my thoughts... without a complete agreement regarding what is going to be done and how it is going to be done".

In the second half of December there were rallies in favor of autonomy, in which, together with the Republicans, the Socialists Francisco Largo Caballero and Julián Besteiro took part, as well as attempted demonstrations which ended with the intervention of the police. On December 18, a group of Spanish nationalists attacked the demonstrators with sticks without the police intervening, and the following day they forced to shout "Viva España" to those who cheered "Catalunya lliure", threatening them with pistols. On the 20th the incidents were repeated, in which the Spanish supporters fired their revolvers although there were no injuries. On the 22nd a police sergeant was wounded by a blow to the head and a lieutenant was also seriously wounded by a shot fired by an unidentified sniper.

== Proposal of the extra-parliamentary commission and draft Statute of the Commonwealth ==
=== Draft Statute of the extra-parliamentary commission with no Catalan participation ===
At the proposal of Cambó with whom he had met before he announced the withdrawal of the Catalan parliamentarians, the president of the government Romanones called an extra-parliamentary commission to draft a proposal of autonomy for Catalonia that would be taken to parliament. On December 21, 1918, the Catalan parliamentarians who had left the Cortes, the Assembly of the Commonwealth and the deputies of the four deputations met in Barcelona to decide whether to participate in the commission created by the government. The republicans proposed that those present should set themselves up as a constituent assembly and draft a proposal for a Statute of Autonomy for Catalonia, while parliamentarians from the dynastic parties were of the opinion that they should form part of the government commission. Finally, it was resolved that the Council of the Commonwealth and the deputy parliamentarians would draw up a draft Statute, although without ruling out the possibility of also going to Madrid. The government expressed its displeasure at

the absolute omission of the published decree creating the extra-parliamentary Commission, a fact which has the value of a solemn requirement addressed to Catalonia, and the silence kept with respect to the power of the Cortes, to whom any autonomist aspiration must ultimately be submitted.

On December 27, the members of the extra-parliamentary commission appointed by the government were announced. It was made up of 33 people, 18 of whom were in favor of Catalan autonomy, although the agreements had to be reached by consensus, since the draft statute to be drawn up had to be approved by the Cortes, where the two dynastic parties had a very large majority. Two days later the Council of the Commonwealth met with the Catalan members of the commission, among them Cambó and the president of the Commonwealth Puig i Cadafalch, and it was decided not to attend the commission in order not to break the unity of those who supported autonomy since the Republicans were opposed. They also argued that certain politicians had also refused to attend, such as Eduardo Dato, who had a good number of deputies behind him, which made it impossible for what the commission agreed to be endorsed by the Cortes. As a Catalan Republican newspaper said, "the Commission was stillborn [...] and, in the end, the Cortes will decide in the last instance, annulling all effectiveness of the Commission". In spite of this, Romanones maintained the convocation.

On January 2 the extra-parliamentary commission met with only 14 of its members since 19 had resigned. A five-member committee was appointed, including Antonio Maura and Niceto Alcalá-Zamora, which concluded its work on January 11. The government assumed the project and presented it to the Cortes on the 21st. The proposal of the extra-parliamentary commission consisted of 22 bases, 21 of which dealt with municipal autonomy and only one, the last one, with regional autonomy. According to this, which consisted of 18 articles and 3 transitory provisions, Catalonia would have an assembly called Diputació (one third of whose members would be elected by the town councils and by certain corporations) and a government with the name of Generalitat. The four provincial deputations would disappear, although the regional power would not have the power to modify the existing provincial territorial division. The co-officiality of Catalan was recognized, including the administration of justice. It also established the possibility of creating a regional police force that would coordinate with the state police force. There were undoubted advances but, as pointed out by the jurists appointed by the Commonwealth to study the proposal, it was more a project of administrative decentralization since no exclusive competence was granted to the regional power nor was any State service transferred to it and, in addition, a new figure was created, that of the governor general of the region, who could refuse to sanction the provisions of the Deputation and of the Generality if he considered that these contained excesses. He also appointed delegates in the four provinces, had the power to dissolve the regional assembly (or Deputation) and to call new elections if he had the approval of the government in Madrid, and maintained the powers of the civil governors in matters of freedom of the press, of association and assembly, and of public order —the Civil Guard was under his direct orders—. The Catalan jurists emphasized that the powers granted to the governor were a step backwards with respect to the relative independence that the Commonwealth had "which has no direct contact of any kind with the [civil] governors".

=== Draft Statute of the Commonwealth of Catalonia ===
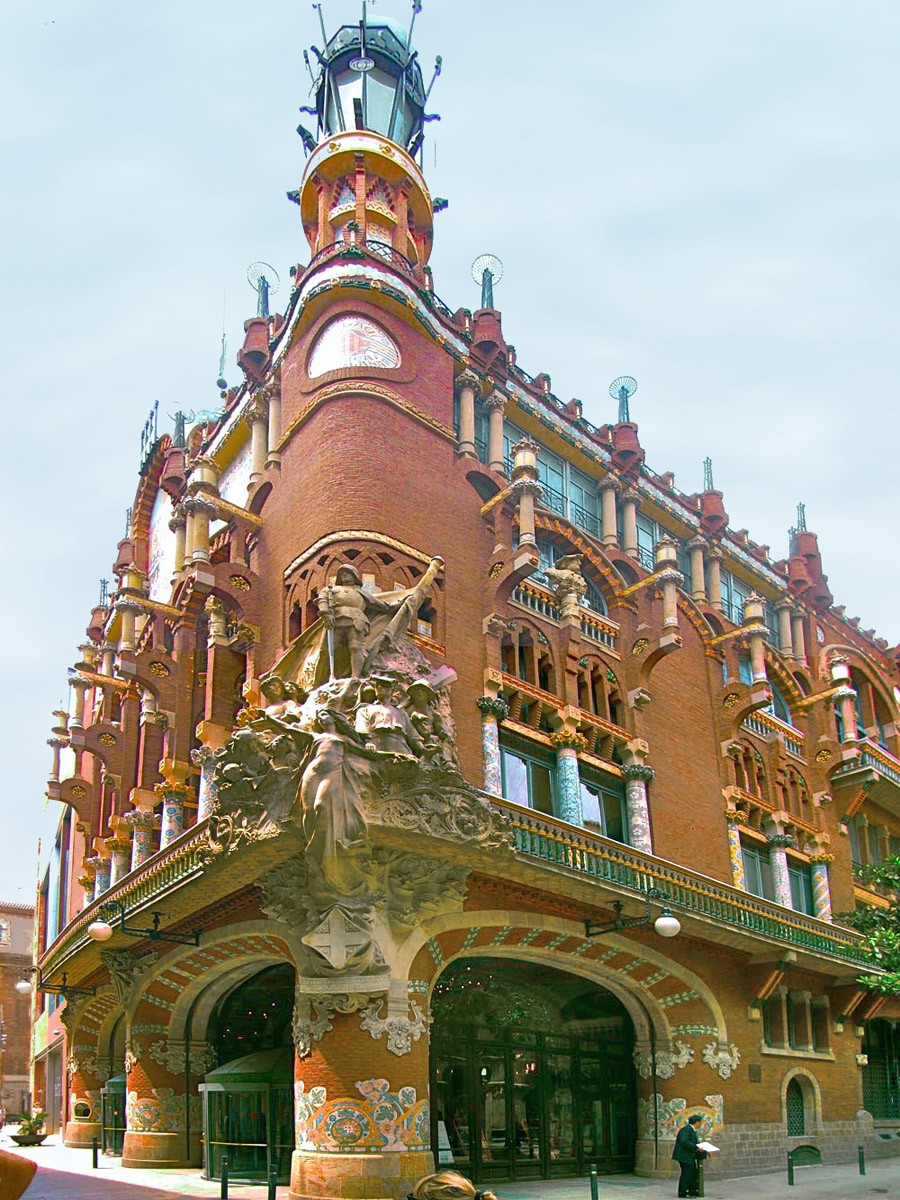
Palau de la Música Catalana where on January 26, 1919, the mayors and delegates of the Catalan municipalities met to approve the draft Statute of Autonomy proposed by the Commonwealth of Catalonia.

While the extra-parliamentary commission was working in Madrid, in Barcelona the Consell de la Commonwealth with the deputy parliamentarians was working on its own draft Statute. It was finished on January 17, a few days after the Madrid commission presented theirs. Four changes were made to the November draft to make it possible for it to be approved by the Cortes. Firstly, the reference to other territories outside Catalonia that could be incorporated into it was eliminated, so that it would not be accused of being a "pan-Catalanist" project. Secondly, the competences that would correspond to the regional power were listed, contrary to what had been done in the bases in which only the competences of the State were listed, so that all those that were not included in the list would correspond to the autonomous region. Thirdly, the mixed and parity commission established in the bases, which was in charge of settling conflicts of competences, was renounced, passing this power to the Spanish Parliament, so that it was left to be both judge and party. Fourthly, the figure of the governor general was incorporated with practically the same powers as in the project of the extra-parliamentary commission of Madrid, although the competence over public order was removed. In conclusion, as the historian Albert Balcells has pointed out, "the draft statute of the Commonwealth of 1919 contained substantial concessions to the central power in comparison with the bases drafted in November 1918 in the four aspects that had been most criticized in Madrid in the parliamentary debate that had provoked the withdrawal of the Catalan deputies".

The draft Statute of the Commonwealth maintained the bicameral regional parliament proposed in the bases, with a senate elected by the councilors of the municipalities and a congress elected by universal suffrage, by means of the majority electoral system except in the constituency constituted by the city of Barcelona, which would be proportional. The ministers of the Catalan government, appointed by the governor general, would be responsible to the two chambers. In addition to legislating on the matters that the Statute declared to be exclusive to the regional power, the Catalan congress and senate could agree on amendments to the laws passed by the Cortes in certain matters, such as social legislation, which would only apply in Catalonia, provided that the Cortes did not oppose them.

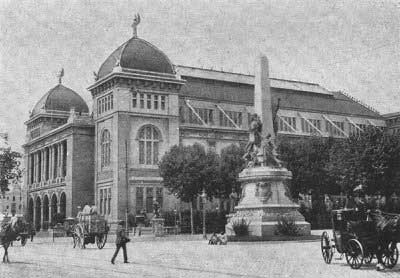
Outside the Palau de les Belles Arts in Barcelona where a banquet was held, offered by the Commonwealth to the mayors and delegates of the Catalan municipalities who on that day, January 26, 1919, had approved the Draft Statute of the Commonwealth of Catalonia.

The powers that corresponded to Catalonia included education at all levels, with the obligation to teach Spanish in primary schools; the municipal and provincial regime, which included the power to modify the territorial division of Catalonia; Catalan civil law, including the creation of a court of cassation; the organization of the administration of justice in Catalonia; public works, except those considered to be of general Spanish interest; telephones; forestry and agricultural services, including the draining and clearing of uncultivated land; charity and health; and public order. To finance these services, a treasury was created to which direct contributions would be transferred. On the other hand, the Statute did not contain any definition of Catalonia, neither as an "autonomous region" (Statute of Autonomy of Catalonia of 1932), nor as a "nationality" (Statute of Autonomy of Catalonia of 1979). Nor was there an article establishing the official or co-official status of Catalan.

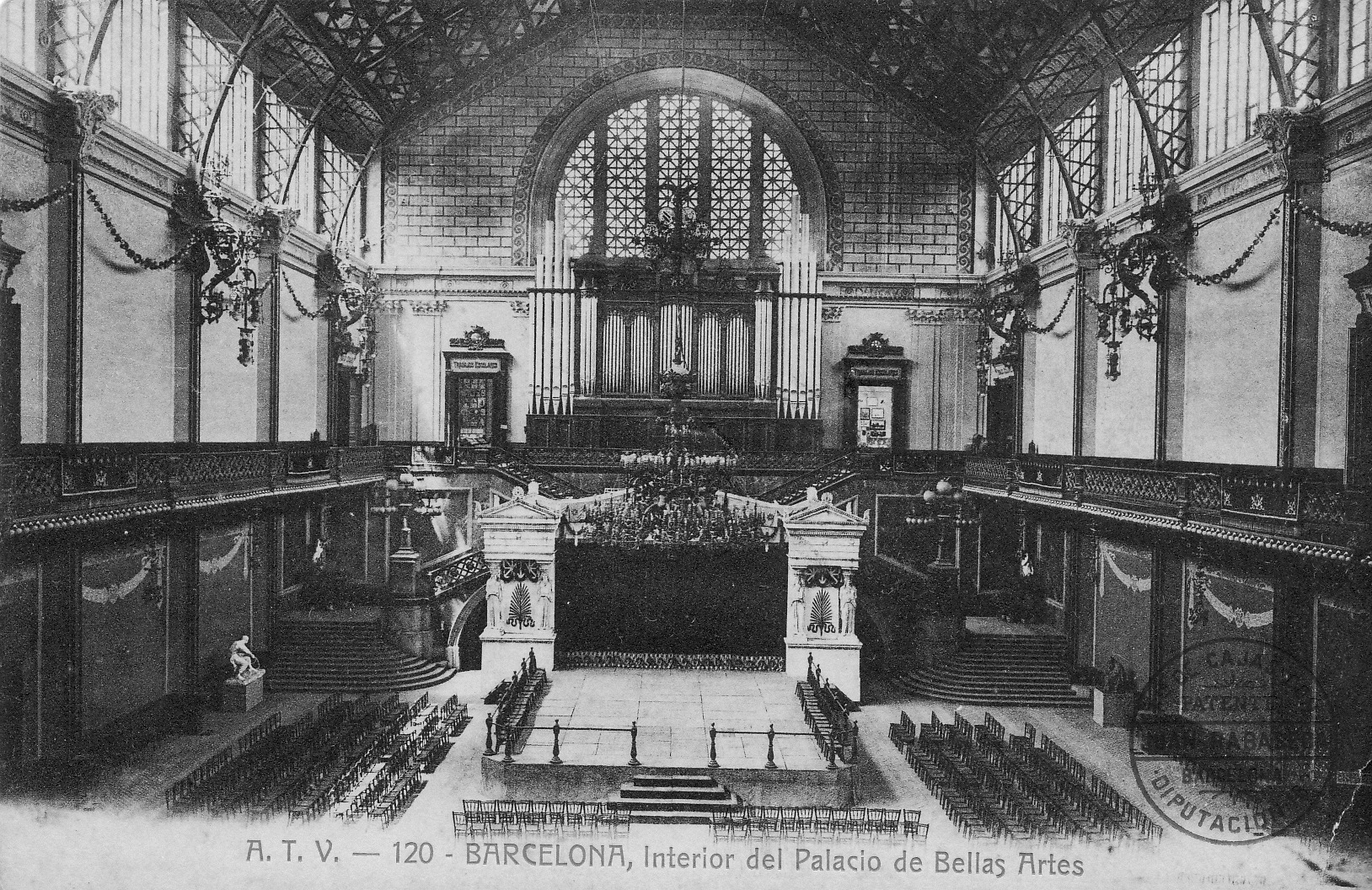
Hall of the Queen Regent of the Palau de les Belles Arts of Barcelona where the attendants to the banquet offered by the Commonwealth were seated.

On January 24 and 25, 1919, the extraordinary Assembly of the Commonwealth and the Catalan parliamentarians debated extensively and unanimously approved —the Catalan deputies and senators of the dynastic parties also voted in favor— the draft Statute of the Consell, which was ratified on Sunday 26th by the mayors and delegates of the Catalan municipalities gathered at the Palau de la Música Catalana in Barcelona —of the 1072 Catalan municipalities 1046, representing 99% of the population, presented the minutes in which their favorable vote was recorded—. In the Palau, Cambó he said:

Never in Catalonia had the will of the Catalan people been so fully expressed as it is at this moment; whatever is agreed here is undoubtedly the expression of the will of Catalonia.

=== Catalanist agitation and Spanishist reaction in Barcelona ===
Between January 11 and 26, 1919, while the draft of the Statute of the Commonwealth was being elaborated, practically every day the attempts of demonstration of the Catalan nationalist groups to the cry of "Visca Catalunya Lliure" and the police charges to prevent them returned to the center of Barcelona. Spanish nationalist groups of the Spanish Patriotic League also intervened, shouting "Viva España" and attacking demonstrators or people wearing ribbons with the Catalan flag. In these incidents the police acted on the side of the pro-Spanish protesters and arrested only the Catalan nationalists accused of "incitement to rebellion", a fact that was denounced by the press. Sometimes it was the police themselves who removed the ribbons with the four-colored flag from their lapels. CNT leaders were also arrested, such as Salvador Seguí, the Noi del sucre, and the newspaper Solidaridad Obrera was closed. On January 17 a large group of the Patriotic League, among them army officers stationed in Barcelona, burst into a theater at the moment when those gathered were singing the hymn Els Segadors and began to shoot. Numerous people were wounded due to the panic caused by the violent irruption, one of them shot, but none of the assailants was arrested. The government then decreed the suspension of constitutional guarantees, so censorship was imposed and the press could no longer report on the anti-Catalanist violence or the actions of the police. The conservative newspaper La Vanguardia justified the suspension by equating the autonomist campaign with the strikes and anarchist attacks. In its editorial of the 19th it said:

[...] the street riots repeated with futile pretexts; the strikes also daily planned, the attacks against workers and bosses, the expectation [...] of a threatening regional Assembly, and above all the revolutionary propaganda [...] all contribute to the exacerbation of passions in the cause of autonomy and unionism [...], giving the paradox that the opposing forces, such as the revolutionary parties and some Catalanists who call themselves conservatives, collaborate in sustaining the abnormality, of course without involving the respective disputes, which they keep perfectly separate. But in vain do these elements want to disengage themselves from the campaign of the unions, to which they involuntarily lend help with their rebellious attitude; their issues are different, but the abnormality receives the incentive from both sides, and thus we see the government turn with the same haste to the two sources of disturbance, entrusting to a committee the drafting of the regional statute and immediately ordering the Institute of Social Reforms to study new improvements for the working class.

After the suspension of the guarantees, the violence of the groups of the Spanish Patriotic League did not stop. On January 17 they wounded a young Catalan nationalist worker who died three days later. On the 24th the police charges were extraordinarily harsh, causing serious damage to the cafés on the Rambla when the police broke into them in pursuit of the demonstrators. The regionalist deputy Pere Rahola compared the police action to the brutal treatment given by the indigenous police to the Rifian rebels in the Spanish protectorate of Morocco. On Sunday, January 27, while the act of ratification by the municipal delegates of the draft Statute of the Commonwealth was being held in the Palacio de la Música, the last violent confrontations took place. That day a young man wearing a tie with the colors of the Catalan flag was attacked by a group of the Spanish Patriotic League, but the people came to his defense and the aggressors had to flee. At noon there was a shooting confrontation between Carlist requetés and members of the Patriotic League when the latter tried to remove the ties with the Catalan flag they were wearing on their lapels. Seven people were wounded by gunshot, two of them very seriously —one a Carlist and the other a member of the Patriotic League—. The police arrested twenty people, none of them from the Patriotic League. In another place in Barcelona, groups of the Patriotic League seriously wounded a young man who died a few days later. He was the third and last fatality during the autonomist campaign. On January 28 the civil governor ordered the closure of the premises of the CADCI and those of the Spanish Patriotic League, although its members continued to meet without police intervention, and prohibited the display of Catalan flags in unofficial places and the wearing of ribbons with the four-colored flag.

After January 27, Catalan nationalist agitation ceased and the Spanish Patriotic League discontinued its activities. "In any case, it cannot be considered that the Spanish Patriotic League and the radical nationalist groups were the two extreme sides of the same phenomenon. The members of the League used firearms, and this fact has no correspondence in the radical nationalist groups. The leniency of the police with the former contrasts with the violence they exercised on the latter. It seems that the Patriotic League was an auxiliary group of police and military; in fact, it disappeared without a trace, although some of its members must have joined various later extreme right-wing groups".

== Second debate in the Cortes and end of the campaign ==
The Catalan parliamentarians returned to the Cortes to try to get the draft Statute of the Commonwealth approved. On January 28, 1919, Francesc Cambó participated in the Congress. He first referred to the practically unanimous support that the draft Statute of the Commonwealth had received from the Catalan town councils and confronted those who said that it broke the unity of Spain:

That manifestation of will creates a right, creates the most sacred right, the only legitimate foundation of a power and of a sovereignty. Those who affirm that this authentically expressed will and that we are willing to submit to the unsurpassable ratification of the individual plebiscite, which would undoubtedly consecrate it, those who understand that this attacks the unity of Spain, begin by declaring that today Catalonia is already spiritually, in spirit and in will, separated from Spain. Think about it.

He then stated that the approval of the project of the extra-parliamentary commission that the government had backed would not resolve the question: "The day after the government's project was approved, even with all the modifications compatible with its nature, the problem would remain the same". Cambó ended his intervention with some defiant phrases: "A nation on its feet, unanimous, which formulates an aspiration (whispers) that refers to the regime of its internal life, do you think that in 1919, when the League of Nations is being forged, it does not have the right to what it is requesting? (louder whispers). To the government and to the representatives of the forces which may replace it I require them to express their opinion." However, the government maintained its position of assuming as its own the project of the extra-parliamentary commission and not that of the Commonwealth, which is why it was not debated in the Cortes.

On February 6, the debate began in the Congress of Deputies on the opinion of the parliamentary commission that had studied the draft Statute of the extra-parliamentary commission. The following day, Cambó intervened to oppose the project and to propose the debate on that of the Commonwealth, "because our Statute is a minimum, because in drafting it we took into account that we had no right to raise a bargaining dispute, that in what could be compromised we had to compromise, and we did not have to ask for anything more than what was absolutely indispensable for the autonomy of Catalonia to be a reality, not a fiction". He went on to add that if what was being asked for was seen as a separatist proposal it was tantamount to saying "that we are already spiritually separated and that the union is maintained by force". Then he accused the President of the Government of his lack of support for the Commonwealth project with the phrase: "Your Lordship, like Faust, in order to prolong his ministerial life, has sold his soul to the devil". To which Romanones replied with laughter: "He would have made a good deal!".

Next, the liberal Niceto Alcalá Zamora intervened on behalf of the commission to attack the project of the Commonwealth, alleging that it had been the result of an "illegal deliberation of an irregularly constituted assembly [...] before which we do not have to submit" and declaring himself absolutely opposed to the transfer of the competences that the project attributed to Catalonia. The president of the government then intervened to say that only the project of the extra-parliamentary commission would be discussed. At this impasse, the Catalan republican, regionalist and traditionalist deputies, but not those of the dynastic parties, presented a motion on February 18 for a plebiscite on autonomy to be held in Catalonia. To support the proposal Cambó intervened three days later to say:

... our problem is the following: a nation, the Catalan nation, for centuries has lived as an independent state and has produced a language, a civil law, a political law and a general sentiment that has characterized the expression of its life. And this nation first joined the Crown of Spain, then the incorporation was total with the state, and in centuries of coexistence have created common interests, have created spiritual ties that have established a formula of common patriotism that would be foolish to want to destroy; but at the same time, this personality that had had a life of its own, independent, subsists, and has not disappeared; the language, the law, the juridical sense and the public spirit of its own have persisted, and all that, which was a biological fact while there was not a phenomenon of will that turned it into a political fact. This will, what does it say, what does it express, what does it want? It wants Catalonia to have full sovereignty to govern itself in everything that concerns Catalonia's own internal life, and that in everything that affects everything beyond its borders, there should be only one unity, which is Spain.

The president of the government Romanones declared that he was opposed to the referendum and that he recognized the will of the Catalans to have a statute of autonomy but that it should not necessarily be that of the Commonwealth. Finally, Romanones closed the Cortes on February 27 —precisely the day on which the Catalan plebiscite proposal was to be voted—, taking as a pretext the social conflict that had broken out in Barcelona as a result of the La Canadiense strike. The promoters of the autonomist campaign with Cambó at the head decided then not to promote any movement of civil resistance or municipal boycott, but rather to end the campaign. As Albert Balcells has pointed out, "afterwards it was very easy to say that the Canadiense strike had prevented the municipal boycott. But it is clear that the Somatén could not be prepared as an anti-unionist force under the orders of the captain general [before whom it paraded in Barcelona on January 12] and, at the same time, program a movement of civil disobedience that should have confronted the captain general". Moreover, it should not be forgotten that the Spanish National Monarchist Union (UMN) had just been formed, which constituted a serious threat to the hitherto hegemonic Regionalist League and to the autonomist movement, which until then had had almost all the Catalan parliamentarians of the dynastic parties.

"During the four years that followed the events of 1919, the existence of the UMN, together with the predominance of the periods of exception, which were directed against the CNT but restricted general political freedoms, made it impossible to rebuild the autonomist front to raise again the demand for a statute. The League, which through the words of Francesc Cambó had solemnly announced in the Cortes that it would not participate again in any government until the favorable resolution of the autonomist demands, would form part, with Cambó as Minister of Finance and after the disaster of Annual in Morocco, of the Maura-De la Cierva government of August 1921, without any decentralizing counterpart, and then, with Bertan i Musitu as Minister of Justice, but for a very short time, of the Sánchez Guerra government in March 1922".

In conclusion, according to historian Borja de Riquer, the extra-parliamentary commission presided over by Antonio Maura drew up a draft Statute that was very limited and therefore unacceptable to the Catalan deputies who had returned to Congress. Cambó then asked for a plebiscite to be held in Catalonia to find out whether or not the citizens of Catalonia wanted a Statute of Autonomy, but the deputies of the dynastic parties, including Alfons Sala, president of the recently created National Monarchist Union, extended the debates and the proposal was never discussed. Finally, the government closed the Cortes on February 27, taking advantage of the crisis caused by the Canadiense strike in Barcelona.

According to Javier Moreno Luzón, the government and the king stopped supporting even the project of the extra-parliamentary commission because of the pressures of the garrison of Barcelona and the violent confrontations that took place in Barcelona between the pro-Spanish Patriotic League and the Catalanists, but what definitively silenced the project was the beginning of the "social war" in Barcelona with the strike of La Canadiense in February 1919, since the "regional question" took a back seat in the concerns of the Catalan ruling classes.

On the other hand, the failure of the League favored the emergence of other more radical Catalan nationalist groups such as the Federació Democràtica Nacionalista of Francesc Macià, which would generate Estat Catalá, the Partit Republicà Català of Lluís Companys and Marcelino Domingo and the Socialist Union of Catalonia.

== Bibliography ==
- Barrio Alonso, Ángeles (2004). La modernización de España (1917-1939). Política y sociedad (in Spanish). Madrid: Síntesis. ISBN 84-9756-223-2.
- Balcells, Albert (2010). El projecte d'autonomia de la Mancomunitat de Catalunya del 1919 i el seu context històric (PDF) (in Catalan). Non-commercial edition. Barcelona: Parlament de Catalunya. Archived from the original (PDF) on October 24, 2013.
- De la Granja, José Luis; Beramendi, Justo; Anguera, Pere (2001). La España de los nacionalismos y las autonomías (in Spanish). Madrid: Síntesis. ISBN 84-7738-918-7.
- De Riquer, Borja (2013). Alfonso XIII y Cambó. La monarquía y el catalanismo político (in Spanish). Barcelona: RBA. ISBN 978-84-9006-594-5.
- Juliá, Santos (1999). Un siglo de España. Política y sociedad (in Spanish). Madrid: Marcial Pons. ISBN 84-9537903-1.
- Moreno Luzón, Javier (2009). "Alfonso XIII, 1902-1931". Restauración y Dictadura. Vol. 7 Historia de España dirigida por Josep Fontana y Ramón Villares (in Spanish). Barcelona: Crítica/Marcial Pons. ISBN 978-84-4423-921-8.
- Suárez Cortina, Manuel (2006). La España Liberal (1868-1917). Política y sociedad (in Spanish). Madrid: Síntesis. ISBN 84-9756-415-4.
- Tusell, Javier; García Queipo de Llano, Genoveva (2002) [2001]. Alfonso XIII. El rey polémico (in Spanish) (2nd ed.). Madrid: Taurus. ISBN 84-306-0449-9.
