= Catalan flag =

Catalan flag may either refer to

- Senyera, the flag of Catalonia, an autonomous community of Spain
- Estelada, the modification of the Senyera used by the Catalan independence movement
