= Committee Pro Catalonia =

Catalan political committee

Committee Pro Catalonia (Comitè Pro Catalunya in Catalan) was a Catalan political committee founded on July 8, 1918, to support the actions of the Catalan National Committee in Paris to achieve an official Catalan representation in the League of Nations. It was chaired by Vicenç Albert Ballester and Pere Oliver i Domenge with Francesc Macià (who would become 122nd president of Catalonia, 14 years later), Manuel Folguera i Duran, J. Grant i Sala as leading participants. It counted with the support of Unió Catalanista party, and maintained contacts with members of the Lliga Regionalista. Most of its members integrated into the Federació Democràtica Nacionalista, and later on into the Estat Català (Catalan State) party.

== Bibliography ==
- Joan Crexell i Playà The origin of the independentist flag (in Catalan: L'origen de la bandera independentista), p. 77-80, 1984, Ed. El Llamp.
