= Commonwealth of Catalonia =

Assembly of Catalonia 1914–1925

Commonwealth of Catalonia Mancomunitat de Catalunya (Catalan) Mancomunidad de Cataluña (Spanish)
- 1914–1925
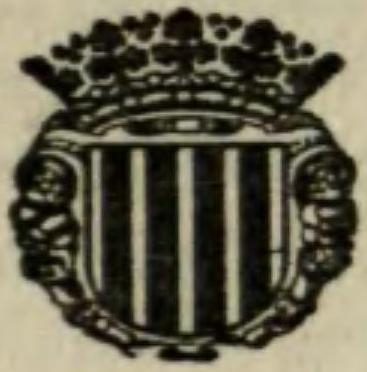
- Flag Coat of arms
- Capital: Barcelona
- Common languages: Spanish (official); Catalan (de facto)
- Government: Federation of provinces
- President
  - 1914–1917: Enric Prat de la Riba (first)
  - 1924–1925: Alfons Sala (imposed) (last)
- Historical era: Bourbon Restoration
  - Established: 6 April 1914
  - Primo de Rivera coup d'état: 13 September 1923
  - Disestablished: 20 March 1925
Preceded by
Province of Barcelona
Province of Tarragona
Province of Lleida
Province of Girona
Succeeded by
Province of Barcelona
Province of Tarragona
Province of Lleida
Province of Girona

The Commonwealth of Catalonia (Catalan: Mancomunitat de Catalunya, IPA: [məŋkumuniˈtad də kətəˈluɲə]) was a federation of the four provinces into which Catalonia had been divided in 1833 and was the first, modest, step towards self-governance. The Commonwealth was the forerunner of the Generalitat de Catalunya established in 1931 and re-established in 1977 and which is the current autonomous government of Catalonia.

The Commonwealth was created in 1914 (symbolically the 200th anniversary of the year of the loss of governing institutions independent of the Spanish central administration) and was disbanded and outlawed in 1925 during Miguel Primo de Rivera's dictatorship.

Although it had only administrative functions and its powers did not go beyond those of the provincial councils, it had great symbolic and practical importance: it represented the first recognition by the Spanish State of the identity and territorial unity of Catalonia since 1714 and was responsible for the creation of many public institutions in health, culture and technical education and science and notably for the support of the Catalan language.

Even so, frustrated with the limited autonomy achieved by the Commonwealth, Catalanism turned to the left, and led inter alia to the founding in 1922 of the first relevant organised Catalan independence party Estat Català by Francesc Macià.

== The long road to reform ==
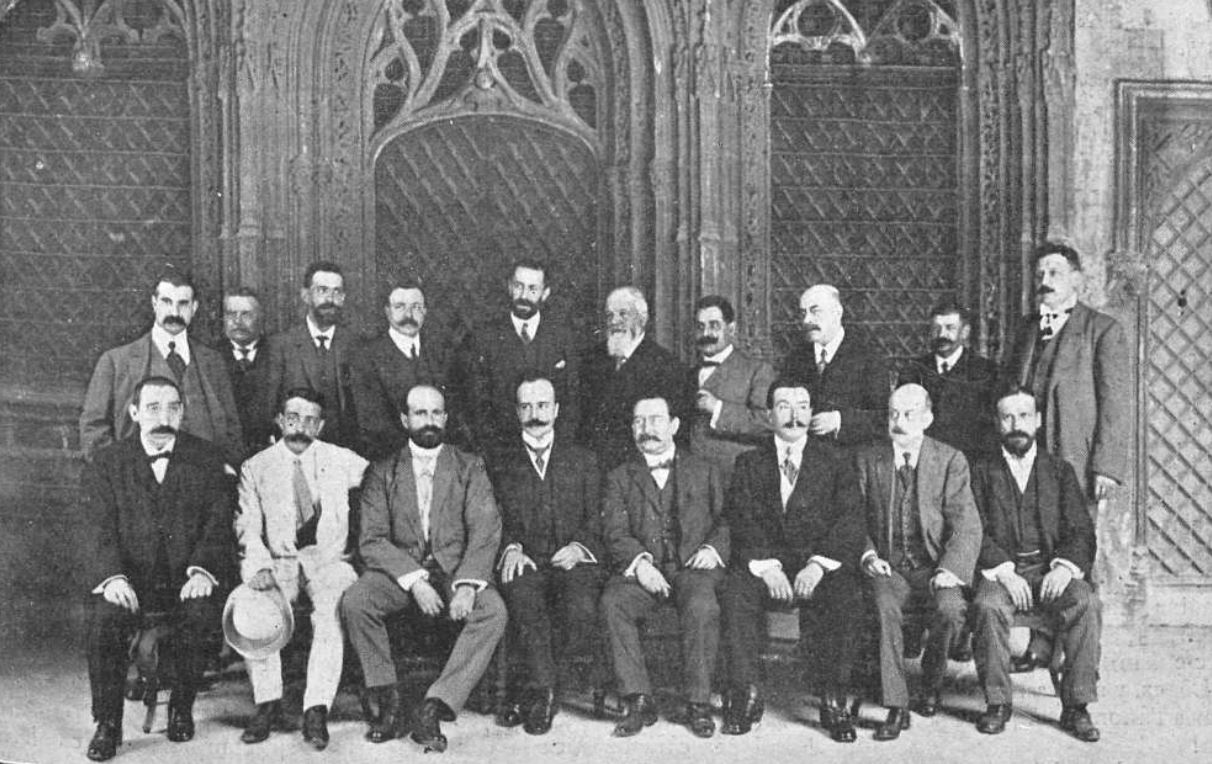
Promoters of the Commonwealth of Catalonia project in 1911

The development of a sense of Catalonia as a separate identity or personality began in the 1840s and 1850s consistent with the romantic movement in Europe. It gained a political dimension, called political Catalanism in the 1890s with the publication of The Bases de Manresa in 1892 by Catalanist Union which sought to move beyond the urban intellectualism of the Renaixença and explicitly called for autonomy for Catalonia and separate government institutions. In 1893 the Union made a decision to enter politics to achieve their aims.

The leader, Enric Prat de la Riba, was elected to Spanish parliament in 1901 and formed the Regionalist League of Catalonia with fellow Catalanist parliamentary members who took seats from the traditional national parties. Prat de la Riba was a social conservative who was convinced that Catalan claims for autonomy must be made with the consent of monarchical Spain.

In 1903, the prime minister, Antonio Maura was promoting a local government reform based on the idea that some form of administrative decentralisation might purify and revive political life. He saw an opportunity to fulfil the Lligas demands through his reforms but without success.

In 1907, Catalanist candidates gained 41 of 44 Catalan seats in parliament and continued to press their demands.

However it was not until 1913 that the lower house of the Spanish Parliament finally approved the creation of commonwealths of provinces but with limited powers compared to those originally envisioned for it by Prat de la Riba and others. Faced with the prospect of obstruction in the Spanish Senate, then prime minister Eduardo Dato’s government issued the law as a decree and on 18 December 1913 the king signed the law granting all Spanish provinces the right to group themselves into associations. Although Valencia considered the idea, Catalonia was to prove to be the only commonwealth so formed.

The commonwealth was the only substantial victory for Catalanists resulting from the Lliga's modest efforts to gain power in local government as a first step on the way to autonomy. It was only because it had limited powers and did not take any powers from the central state that had not already been granted to the provincial councils.

The first President of the Commonwealth of Catalonia was Enric Prat de la Riba and the second was the architect Josep Puig i Cadafalch, both of the Lliga Regionalista, who led a programme of modernisation, to create an efficient infrastructure of roads and ports, hydraulic works, railways, telephones, charities and healthcare. The Commonwealth also undertook initiatives to increase agricultural and forest yields, introducing technological improvements, the improvement of services and education, and promoting education in technologies necessary for Catalan industry.

Prat de la Riba’s stated wish was, “All the villages of Catalonia with a school, a library, a telephone and a road to reach them!”

The Commonwealth was dissolved and outlawed under Miguel Primo de Rivera's dictatorship on 20 March 1925.

== Structure ==
The Assembly of the Commonwealth was initially made up of 36 for councilors from Province of Barcelona and 20 from each of the Provinces of Tarragona, Girona and Lleida) and elected Enric Prat de la Riba, leader of the Regionalist League, as president of the Commonwealth on 6 April 1914. In addition to the assembly and the president, the Commonwealth included an Executive council made up of 2 councilors from each province.

By 1920, all services previously provided by provincial councils had been transferred to the Commonwealth.

== Legacy ==
The Commonwealth created and consolidated a set of cultural and scientific institutions (most of which still exist today) to give greater prestige to Catalan language and culture, such as the Institut d'Estudis Catalans (Institute of Catalan Studies), the Biblioteca de Catalunya (Library of Catalonia), the Escola Industrial (Industrial School), the Escola Superior de Belles Arts (College of Fine Arts), the College of Higher Commercial Studies or the Escola del Treball (College of Industry). Prat de la Riba also created, the Escola de l'Administració Local (School of Local Administration), and required Catalan civil servants to have attended this institution.

Another important effort of the Commonwealth was the promotion of the work of Pompeu Fabra, who was chiefly responsible for the current Catalan writing system and linguistic standard.

On 25 January 1919, the Commonwealth approved a draft Statute of Autonomy. This Statute envisaged an autonomous government made up of a parliament, an executive and a governor-general, defined an autonomous financial framework and delineated the powers of the state and a government of Catalonia. The draft was rejected by the Spanish government, but it remained a point of reference for the drafting of the 1932 Statute of Autonomy.

Ultimately moderate Catalanism failed because it never represented the masses in Catalonia. To Catalan nationalists the Lliga thus became an ‘appendix of monarchical conservatism’ and its insistence on a solution within Spain began to be seen as a permanent denial of the rights of Catalonia. From the dissolution of the Commonwealth, Catalanism turned distinctly to the left.

== Bibliography ==
- Balcells, Albert, ed. (2015). "The Mancomunitat de Catalunya (1914): Centennial of the First Step towards Self-Governance. Symposium". Catalan Historical Review. 8. Barcelona: Institute for Catalan Studies: 89–94. doi:10.2436/20.1000.01.111. ISSN 2013-407X.
- Carr, Raymond (1980). Modern Spain, 1875-1980. Oxford University Press. ISBN 0198221282. OCLC 263625913.
- Carr, Raymond (1982). Spain 1808-1980. Oxford History of Modern Europe (2 ed.). Oxford University Press. ISBN 9780192158284. OCLC 6555498.
- "Mancomunitat de Catalunya" [Commonwealth of Catalonia]. Encyclopedia Catalana (in Catalan). Grup Enciclopèdia Catalana.
- "Beginnings of the autonomous regime, 1918–1932". Gencat.cat. Generalitat de Catalunya.
- "Towards autonomy: the Commonwealth of Catalonia, 1914-1925". Gencat.cat. Generalitat de Catalunya.
- Molas Batllori, Isidre (1983). "El Projecte d'Estatut d'Autonomia de Catalunya" [The design of the Statute of Autonomy of 1919] (PDF). Recerques: Història, economia, cultura (in Catalan). 1983 (14): 69–79. ISSN 0210-380X.
- "Brief History". Mancomunitat de Catalunya. Diputació de Barcelona. 2014.
- "How did the Mancommunitat work?". Mancomunitat de Catalunya. Diputació de Barcelona. 2014.

== See also ==
- Generalitat de Catalunya
- Catalan Republic (1931)
- Statute of Autonomy of Catalonia of 1932
- List of presidents of the Government of Catalonia
