= Vicenç Albert Ballester =

Spanish merchant sailor (1872-1938)

Vicenç Albert Ballester i Camps (September 18, 1872 in Barcelona – August 15, 1938 in El Masnou) was a Spanish politician, Catalan nationalist, considered by some to be the designer and promoter of the "estelada", Catalonia's independence flag.

== Biography ==
Ballester was the son of Vicenç Ballester (from Calaf, Anoia) and Cristina Camps (from Lleida), where the family owned lands and flour mills. He had early ties to the town of El Masnou, having worked there and later raised a family there. He began his studies in seamanship in 1890, having already learned to sail in El Masnou. After four years, in 1894, he obtained his merchant pilot's license which allowed him to sail as a captain. Nevertheless, his career in the merchant marine was cut short for health reasons: he had osseous problems in one of his knees. This did not, however, keep Ballester from going to Cuba, in 1898 when the Caribbean island declared its independence. Upon his return to El Masnou he became a partner and employee in a company that commercialized acetylene gas, used at the time for street lighting.

Once Ballester established himself more in El Masnou, he began to participate in political activities promoting Catalan nationalism, especially through several Catalanist publications. In 1901 he became a member of the Foment Autonomista Català and head of La Reixa, and as such organised the acts of September 11, 1908 (Catalonia's National Day) which resulted in a prison sentence. He was also a member of the Associació Protectora de l'Ensenyança Catalana (Association for the Protection of Education in Catalan) and in 1903 founded the magazine La Tralla writing under the pseudonym VIC (whose initials in Catalan stand for "Long Live the Independence of Catalonia") and VICIME ("Long Live the Independence of Catalonia and Die Spain"). He was also a member of the Associació Nacionalista Catalana (Catalan Nationalist Association). He collaborated in the bulletin of the CADCI and formed part of the Unió Catalanista (Catalanist Union). In 1915 he took part in the foundation of the Mossèn Cinto School, of which he was president that same year.

In 1918, after the end of the First World War, he was one of the promoters of the Committee Pro Catalonia, which aimed to get recognition for the effort of the Catalan Volunteers in the First World War in order to ask the Society of Nations for support for Catalan independence, following the postulates of the US president Woodrow Wilson, who defended the right to self-determination of peoples. It is in this committee that Vincent Albert Ballester created the estelada flag. Ballester was a very active Catalan activist and in 1923 he was one of the participants (and later chronicler) of the September 11th demonstration that year, which was violently put down with sabre charges, just one day before the coup d'état of general Primo of Rivera. Ballester backed the foreign campaign of Francesc Macià's Catalan State although he was critical with the planned invasion from Prats de Molló. Beginning in 1924 he was the last president of Unió Catalanista, which under his leadership became a political party and adopted a pro-independence ideology. Ballester collaborated with numerous Catalan magazines in the Americas, including Ressorgiment (Revival) in Buenos Aires, and La Nova Catalunya (New Catalonia) in Havana, Cuba. Gravely ill, he died shortly before the Francoist occupation of Catalonia.

== Legacy ==
In August 2009, the town of Vic voted to name a square in his honor. In January 2014 a square in the Ciutat Vella district of Barcelona was inaugurated with his name. In mid-2014, the city of Girona paid homage to the estelada designer by lending his name to the Montilivi municipal gardens after having voted the resolution six years earlier during the centennial celebration of the Estelada.

== See also ==
- Estat Català
- Estelada

== Bibliography ==
- Crexell i Playà, Joan. L'origen de la bandera independentista. Barcelona: Editorial El Llamp, 1984. ISBN 978-8477810148.
- Surroca i Tallaferro, Robert. La Catalunya resistant: Allò que la transició ens ha amagat. Tom 87. Lleida: Pagès Editors, 2006 (Col·lecció Guimet). ISBN 9788497793469.
