= Communist Party of Spain (international) (1975) =

- Spanish name: Partido Comunista de España (Internacional)
- Catalan name: Partit Comunista d'Espanya (internacional)
- Founded: 1975
- Dissolved: 1980s
- Headquarters: Barcelona
- Newspaper: Hoja informativa
- Youth wing: Unión de Juventudes Marxistas Leninistas
- Ideology: Communism; Catalan independentism Antifascism; Revolutionary Socialism
- Political position: Far-left
- Colors: Red

The Communist Party of Spain (international) (Spanish: Partido Comunista de España (Internacional), Catalan: Partit Comunista d'Espanya (internacional)) was formed in 1975 after a split of the PCE(i)-Linea proletaria took again the name of PCE(i), used by the Spanish Labour Party until 1974. The PCE(i) defended the independence of the oppressed peoples of Spain, specially the Catalan one, from a working-class viewpoint. The PCE(i) had its main stronghold in Barcelona. The party was illegal for all of its existence, and defended urban guerrilla tactics.

== Ideology ==
Its ideological basis were Leninism and Maoism. The PCE(i) was in favor of low-intensity urban guerrilla, and was contrary to political reforms and defended the independence of Catalonia, the Canary Islands and the Balearic Islands.

PCE(i) Estelada

They were always an illegal and underground organization. Its symbol in Catalonia was the red estelada.

== History ==
The influence of the PCE(i) the streets of Barcelona was remarkable because of the riots produced in their demonstrations against riot police. The PCE(i) began to decline following the death of its (unarmed) member Gustau Muñoz, shot by the Spanish police during a demonstration in Barcelona in 1978. The facts and the responsibilities of this death were never clarified. After this death numerous members of the party were arrested and imprisoned, leaving the party in a very difficult situation. The same year another member of the party, Jordi Martínez de Foix i Llorenç, died while manipulating an explosive device. Socors Català and other organizations said that they doubted the veracity of the official version. The public funeral of Jordi was banned.

After 1978 the PCE(i) gradually disappeared by the arrest of most of its members and the dismantling of the party structures. Some members of the party were sentenced to long prison terms without specific reason. The party was never officially dissolved, but its generally considered to be totally disarticulated at the end of 1980. In 1983 a judge recognized that three members of the party arrested in Valladolid in 1980 had been tortured by the police. In 1985 the direction of the party (all of them in jail at the time) was absolved of unlawful association and released.

== See also ==
- Balearic Anticolonialist Group
