= Statute of Catalonia of 1919 =

The Statute of Catalonia of 1919 started in a pro-autonomist environment and was approved by the Assembly of the Commonwealth of Catalonia in Barcelona, on 24 January 1919 with the support of several Catalan parties: The Partit Català Republicà (Republican Catalan Party) took this Statute as its main concern, Alejandro Lerroux's radicals endorsed it, Francesc Cambó and his party (Lliga Regionalista) asked for a pragmatic vision. Liberals and Conservatives (who were in the Spanish government) went against central party policy, and the Traditionalists remembered his defense of autonomy with weapons. Francesc Macià -speaking as a supporter of independence- said that this was a short Statute, but the best one that could be achieved. Finally, Largo Caballero, speaking as a Socialist, stated that Spanish workers believed that Catalan Autonomy was the first step in the regeneration of Spain.

On 26 January, this Statute was ratified in an Assembly held at the Palau de la Música of Barcelona, which gathered all the municipal representatives together. 1,046 of 1,072 towns voted positively, as well as 2,076,251 of the 2,099,218 eligible citizens. It also got the approval of several civic entities and corporations such as the Centre Regionalista Andalús (Regionalist Center of Andalusia), the Football Club Barcelona, the Bloc Regionalista Castellà (Castilian Regionalist Crew, in Madrid) or the Club Sports Catalunya, in Mexico.

This project was sent to the Spanish Government for its approval on 28 January 1919 with several Catalan deputies to defend it, but the Socio-political situation, which changed quickly due to several strikes in the Catalan field, first, the collision between Government of Catalonia's interests and the Spanish government's ones, secondly, and, finally, the dictatorship of Primo de Rivera stopped its progression.

== The structure of the text ==
The structure of the Autonomy Statute of Catalonia, as the previously list made by Woodrow Wilson in the “Fourteen Points”, was approved by the Assembly of the Commonwealth is as follows:

- Preliminar declaration
- First title: About the land of Catalonia.
  It includes the article number 1.
- Second title: About the Catalan citizens.
  It includes the article number 2.
- Third title: About the Government of Catalonia.
  It includes the articles number 3, 4 and 5.
- Fourth title: The own and exclusive faculties of the regional power.
  It includes the articles number 6 and 7.
- Fifth title: About the intervention of the regional power in general-law regulated stuff.
  It includes the articles number 8 and 9, 10 and 11.
- Sixth title: About the regional finance.
  It includes the articles number 12 and 13.
- Seventh title: About the regional Parliament.
  It includes the articles between number 16 and 29.
- Eighth title: About the general governor and the power of the regional executive.
  It includes the articles between number 30 and 34.
- And a final Temporary rules section.
