= Balearic Anticolonialist Group =

Balearic Anticolonialist Group Grup Anticolonialista Balear
- Founded: 1978
- Ideology: Communism; Balearic independence Marxism-leninism
- Political position: Radical left
- National affiliation: Communist Party of Spain (international)

Balearic Anticolonialist Group (Catalan: Grup Anticolonialista Balear; Spanish: Grupo Anticolonialista Balear) was a political organization in the Balearic Islands founded in January 1978. It was yet one more short-lived minority agent in the agitated political context of the Spanish Transition to democracy.

GAB campaigned for independence of the Balearic Islands from Spain, but, contrary to the typical view of radical nationalist left groups, it did not ask for the hypothetical independent Balearic islands to become a part of an equally hypothetical independent Països Catalans.

GAB was politically tied to the Communist Party of Spain (international) (PCE(i)).
