= Estelada =

Flag typically flown by Catalan independence supporters

- Estelada blava
- Use: Civil flag
- Proportion: 2:3
- Design: Nine horizontal alternating equal stripes of yellow and red, with a white five-pointed star on a blue triangle at the hoist.
- Designed by: Vicenç Albert Ballester
- Estelada vermella
- Use: Civil flag
- Adopted: 1972
- Design: Nine horizontal alternating equal stripes of yellow and red, with a red five-pointed star on a yellow triangle at the hoist.

The Estelada (Eastern Catalan: [əstəˈlaðə]; pl. Estelades; full name Senyera estelada, lit. 'starred flag' or 'lone star flag', from estel, "star") is a flag flown by Catalan independence supporters to express their support for an independent Catalonia or independent Països Catalans (Catalan Countries, the Catalan-speaking territory, which includes Valencia and the Balearic Islands). The design of the Estelada comprises the red-and-yellow bars of the Senyera, with the addition of a five-pointed star in a triangle at the hoist.

The use of this flag as a protest symbol within Catalan nationalism has become more notable since the 1970s Spanish transition to democracy. The self-proclaimed Catalan Republic of 2017 did not adopt the Estelada as its national flag, instead using the regular Senyera.

== Design and meaning ==
The flag dates from the early 20th century; it was most probably designed in 1918 by Vicenç Albert Ballester i Camps. It came from combining the traditional four red stripes over a yellow field of the Senyera with a blue triangle at the hoist containing a five-pointed white star, inspired by the flags of Cuba, the Philippines and Puerto Rico. Later designs combine the Senyera with a yellow triangle at the hoist containing a five-pointed red star. In both designs the lone star motif means Catalan independence.

== History ==
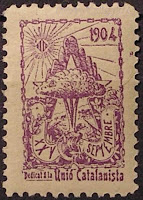
1904 promotional stamp issued by the Catalanist Union featuring Pi de les Tres Branques and the date 25 September

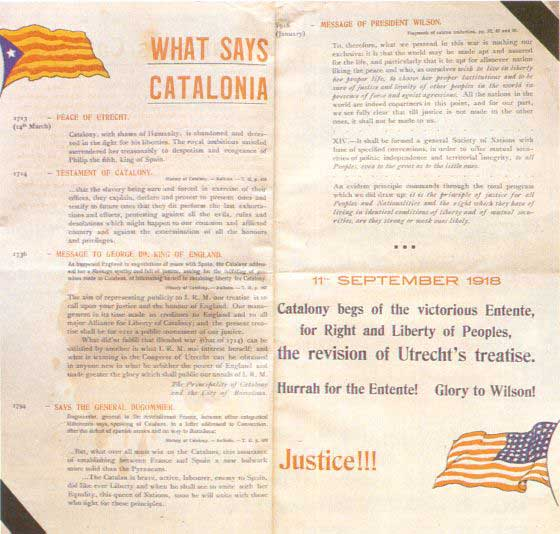
Catalan leaflet from 1918 with the first Estelada

Blue estelada (1918)

Red estelada (1972)

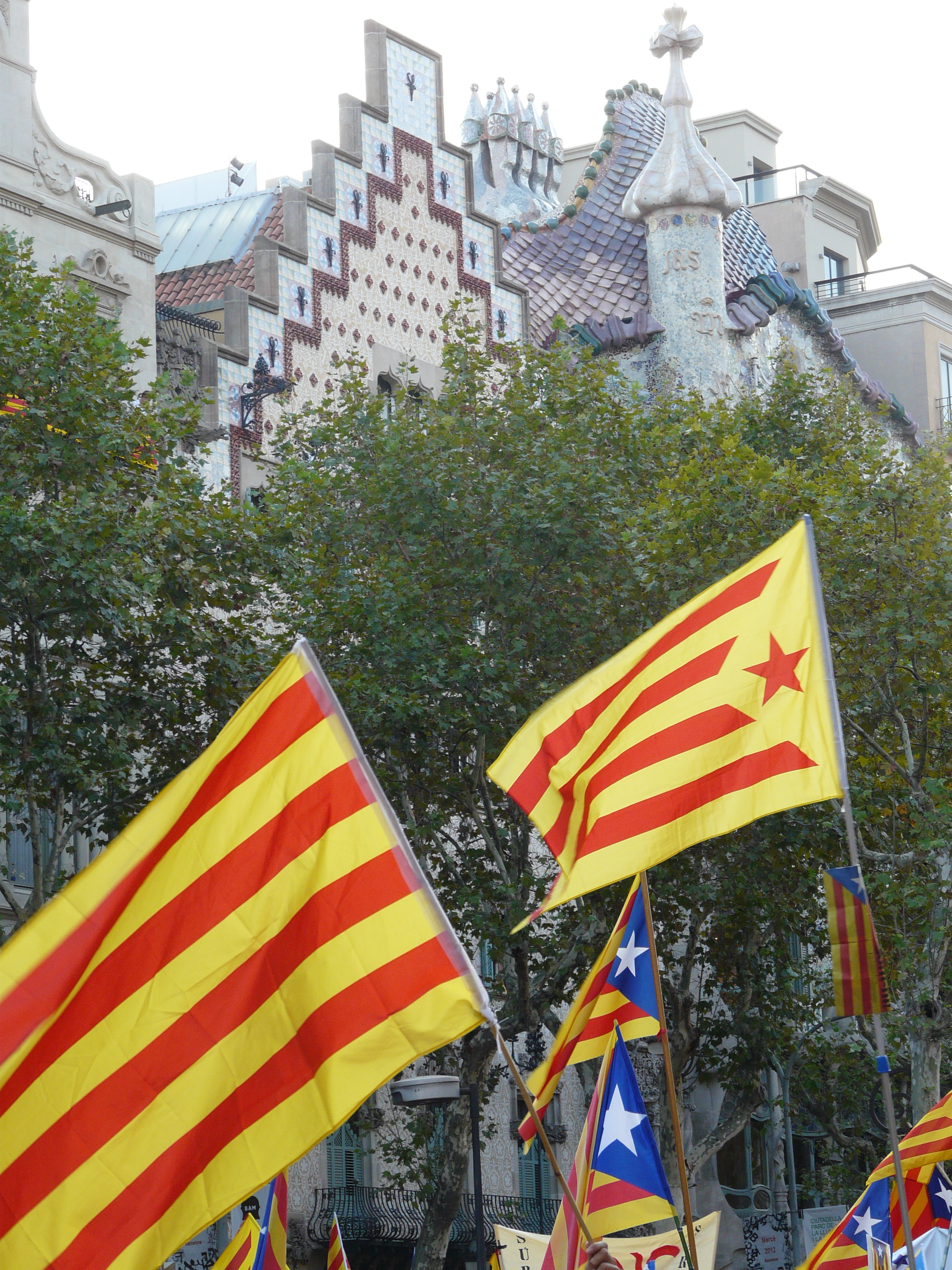
The classical flag, without the star, is called the senyera, seen here among Estelada flags

The 3rd Article of the provisional Constitution of the Catalan Republic, written and approved in 1928 in Cuba by the Assemblea Constituent (Constituent Assembly) of Catalan separatism, specifically provided that the official flag of the Catalan Republic should consist of four red bars on a yellow field, superimposed with a white five-pointed star in a blue triangle.

The star in the flag comes from the early days of nationalism, the lone star symbolising national freedom and independence. Cuba's fight for its independence was watched closely by the Catalanists of the nineteenth century and in 1906, the Centre Catalanista de Santiago de Cuba (Catalanist Centre of Santiago de Cuba) was created. An embryonic Catalan estelada flag could already be seen: in the middle of a senyera there was a white star with five points.

The first star with a clear nationalist intent known in Catalonia is from before 1904, associated with the Unió Catalanista (Catalanist Union). It is a stamp commemorating the acquisition of the Pi de les Tres Branques (Three-Branched Pine) by the Catalanist Union.

Later, in 1906, a star appeared in the nameplate of the magazine Fora Grillons! (Breaking Chains!), published in Santiago de Cuba by Catalan exiles - a publication that had already clearly proclaimed the independence of Catalonia.

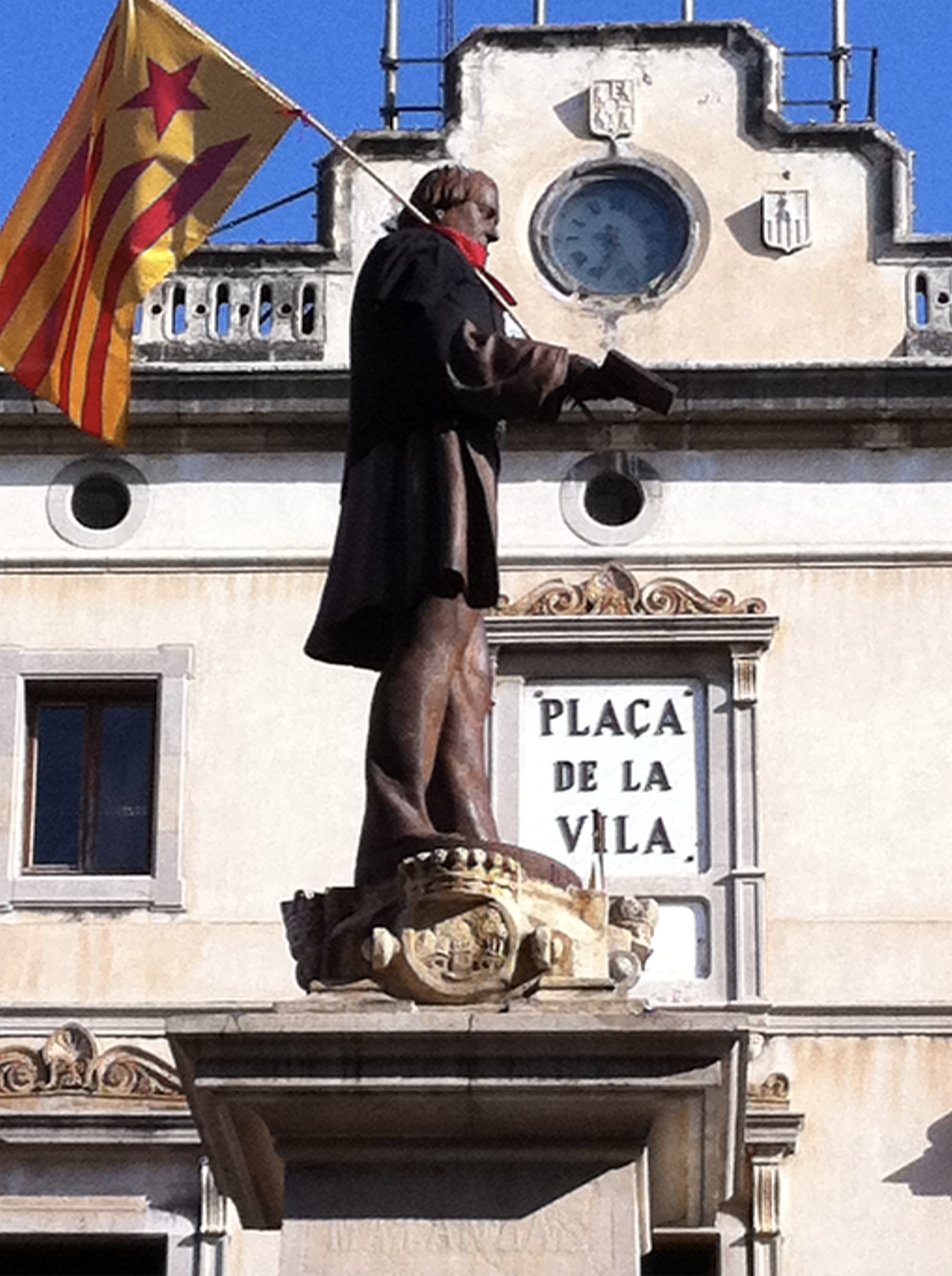
Red Estelada placed on monument in Vilanova i la Geltrú during Festa Major 2012

During the late 1910s, once World War I was over, Europe saw a wave of new nation-states being created, with the assistance of President Woodrow Wilson.

The politics of the League of Nations (and later the United Nations) allowed many nations to seize the opportunity of independence, and Czechoslovakia, Finland, Estonia, Latvia, Lithuania, and Iceland did so in 1918; other nations like Armenia, Azerbaijan, Ukraine, Belarus and Georgia, were declared independent, but were then immediately annexed by the Soviet Union. From the nations that hoped for independence, pressure groups began to mobilize internationally. In the Catalan case, the Comitè Pro-Catalunya (Pro-Catalonia Committee) was one of the most active. It was in this context that a need was perceived to have a flag as a symbol of Catalan aspiration; and, of course, a star appeared on it. Since then the estelada flag began to be spoken of. It was probably designed by Vicenç Albert Ballester, with the blue triangle signifying the blue sky of humanity, and the white star symbolizing freedom.

The first photograph in which the flag appeared was in a publication dated the bulletin L’intransigent (The Intransigent) in 1918. It shows a group of young Americans and Catalan separatists holding both flags.

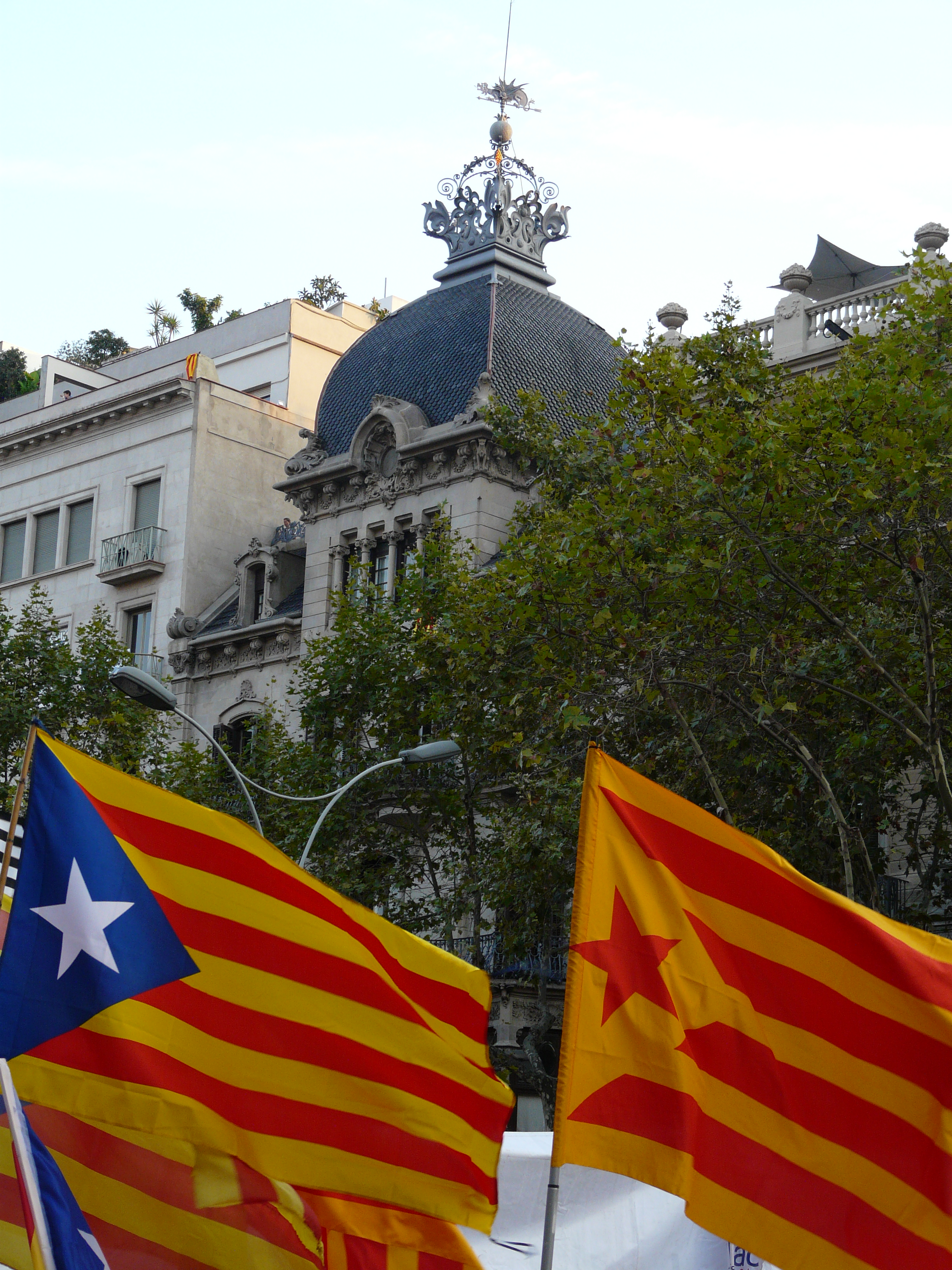
A red and a blue estelada in the 2012 Catalan independence demonstration

Also in 1918, there was a comic strip in circulation—a stamp without postal value—dedicated to the future League of Nations, where there was also an estelada.

There are several kinds of estelada. One is in the last number of La Tralla ("The Whip", a radical separatist magazine from the 1920s), before the coup d'état by Miguel Primo de Rivera. The other is in a document published by the Comitè Pro-Catalunya written in Catalan and Arabic, to greet and encourage one of the Moroccan leaders who revolted against Spain.

In Cuba, it appeared for first time in the nameplate of the magazine La Nova Catalunya (1920), (The New Catalonia). The estelada flag went on to appear in other Catalan separatist publications.

An estelada was owned by Francesc Macià during the failed invasion of Prats de Molló in 1926; it appeared between the imprisonment of the Catalan volunteers and their transfer to Paris to be put on trial. There are photographs of the volunteers with the estelada in several other places.

In 1928, with the presidency of Francesc Macià in the Constituent Assembly of the Catalan independence movement, the estelada was again seen, and the Catalan separatists made it their flag.

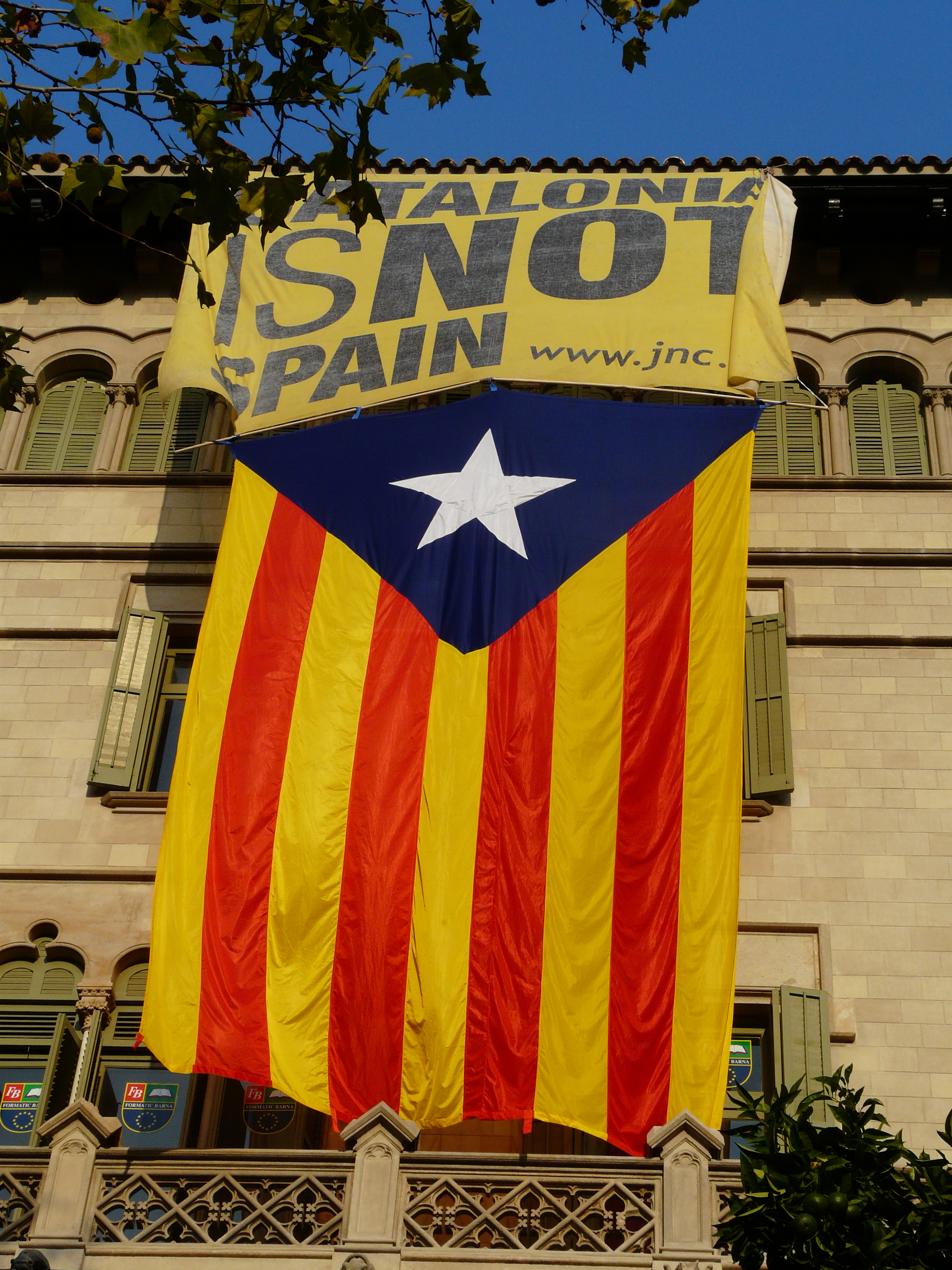

During this period a new practice began, and continues to the present day; whenever a prominent Catalan nationalist dies, as a sign of mourning, his comrades will cover the red bars of the estelada with a black cloth, leaving the star visible to signify that they will continue pursuing the same ideals.

Later, during the period from 1931 to 1936, the estelada still appears numerous times. Some of these flags only have two colours due to the shortage of money, but the traditional estelada with the blue triangle and white star was kept.

After the Francoist dictatorship came to power, the Front Nacional de Catalunya (National Front of Catalonia), or FNC, which used the Catalan flag and the estelada, was formed in response to the new Spanish nationalist regime.

During the sixties, in the university section of the FNC, there was a faction called the Partit Socialista d’Alliberament Nacional dels Països Catalans, (Socialist Party for the National Liberation of the Catalan Countries), or PSAN. Because this party wanted to make its own socialist and Marxist ideas clear, it decided to change the colour of the star to red; in 1969, this new version of the estelada started to appear at PSAN meetings.

In the mid-seventies, the PSAN had, in turn, its own splits. They led to the creation of a new movement, the Moviment d’Unificació Marxista (Movement of Marxist Unification), which started to use the red star inside a white triangle, while the PSAN kept the red star inside a yellow triangle.

The unification of the two versions of the flag could only take place when the Movement of Marxist Unification and the Bloc d’Esquerra d’Alliberament Nacional (Left National Liberation Bloc), or BEAN, both disbanded. At that time the flag with the red star and the yellow triangle were a symbol of both socialist and communist separatists.

== Current use ==
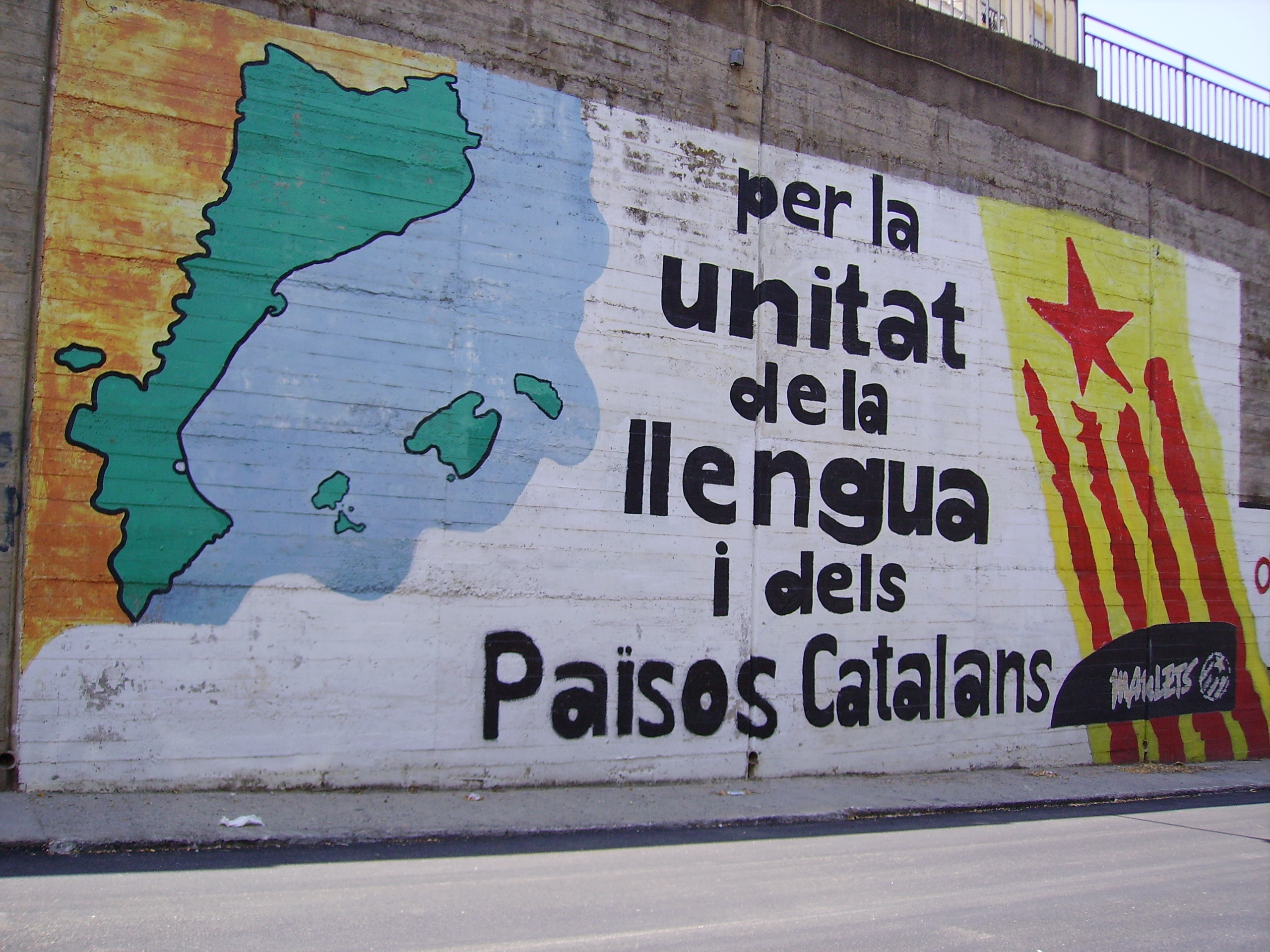
Graffiti at Argentona, depicting a red estelada

As of 2005 both kinds of Estelada flag (the classic and the red) are used at the same time.

After the Fall of Communism in Europe the red star of the Estelada vermella (red estelada) has steadily lost some of its original leftist meaning, however, the left-wing pro-independence political parties still make use of it predominantly and almost exclusively, particularly the Popular Unity Candidacy (CUP), Endavant and Poble Lliure, as well as their youth organizations and trade unions. It is sometimes currently flown just as a simpler and less cluttered version of the Estelada in the traditional Catalan colors.

The estelada is ubiquitous as a simplified symbol - four vertical bars topped by a star, sprayed or daubed on walls, lampposts or mailboxes all over Catalonia. These simple graffiti are most often in one basic color, either in black or red. More elaborate large pro-independence graffiti often use the red-star Estelada as a symbol.

In 2016, the Spanish government prohibited football fans from bringing esteladas to the Copa del Rey final match between Barcelona and Sevilla, held in Madrid. The government applied the article 2.1 of the Law on Sports, which prohibits the display of symbols that "incite, foment or help violent or terrorist behavior." A Madrid judge overruled the ban after Barcelona complained, citing freedom of expression.

== Valencian nationalist Senyera ==

The Valencian nationalist Senyera, also known simply as Estrelada, is a flag of Valencian Community that evolved from the regional flag based on the former Catalan Estelada.

The white star version has been used by Valencian nationalist groups since the early 20th century. Some of these groups may be blaverist (Valencian regionalist, as opposed to Catalan nationalist) in their ideology, especially those with more pro-sovereign positions.

The oldest extant document showing this Estrelada - with a red star - is a war poster of the Valencian Left.

== Variations ==
Since its creation, various Estelades, or Estrelades (such as the Andalusian, Aragonese or Galician separatist flags) have been adopted by leftist separatist movements within Spain. Some Estelades have also been used for other purposes than separatism.

=== Other Spanish Estelades ===
Aragon

Galicia
(Estreleira)

Asturias

Canary Islands

Andalusia

Castile

Murcia

Extremadura

La Mancha

León

Andalusia (Variation)

=== Other Estelades ===
Starry with colors of Club Joventut de Badalona

Starry with colors of RCD Espanyol

Starry with colors of FC Barcelona

Starry with colors of Palamós CF

Version used by the PCE(i)

Estelada verda, green version used by ecologists and animalists

The first Estelada, with a blue rhombus, old version of the current blue design

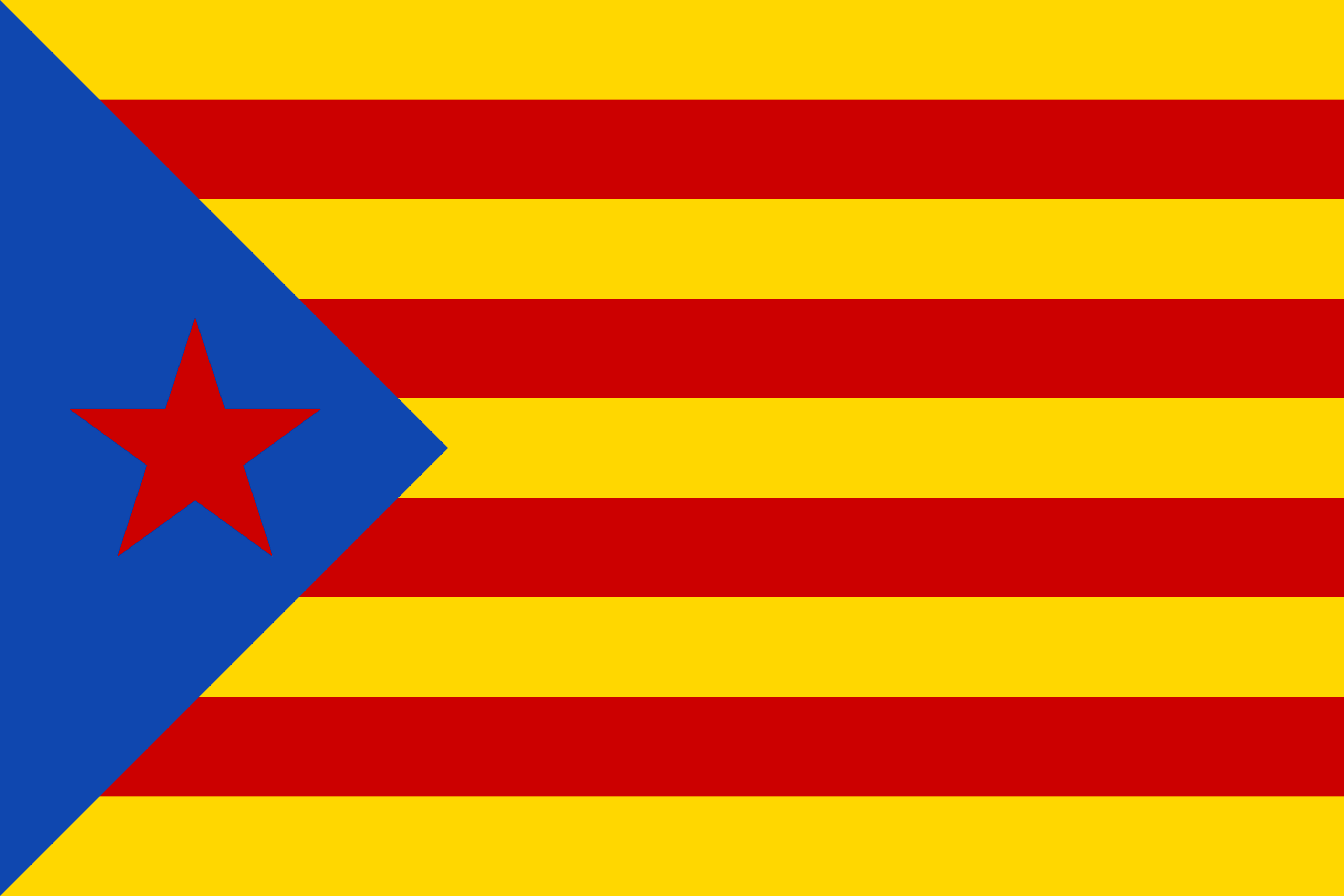
Old type of blue estelada with red star. Used by the Socors Català

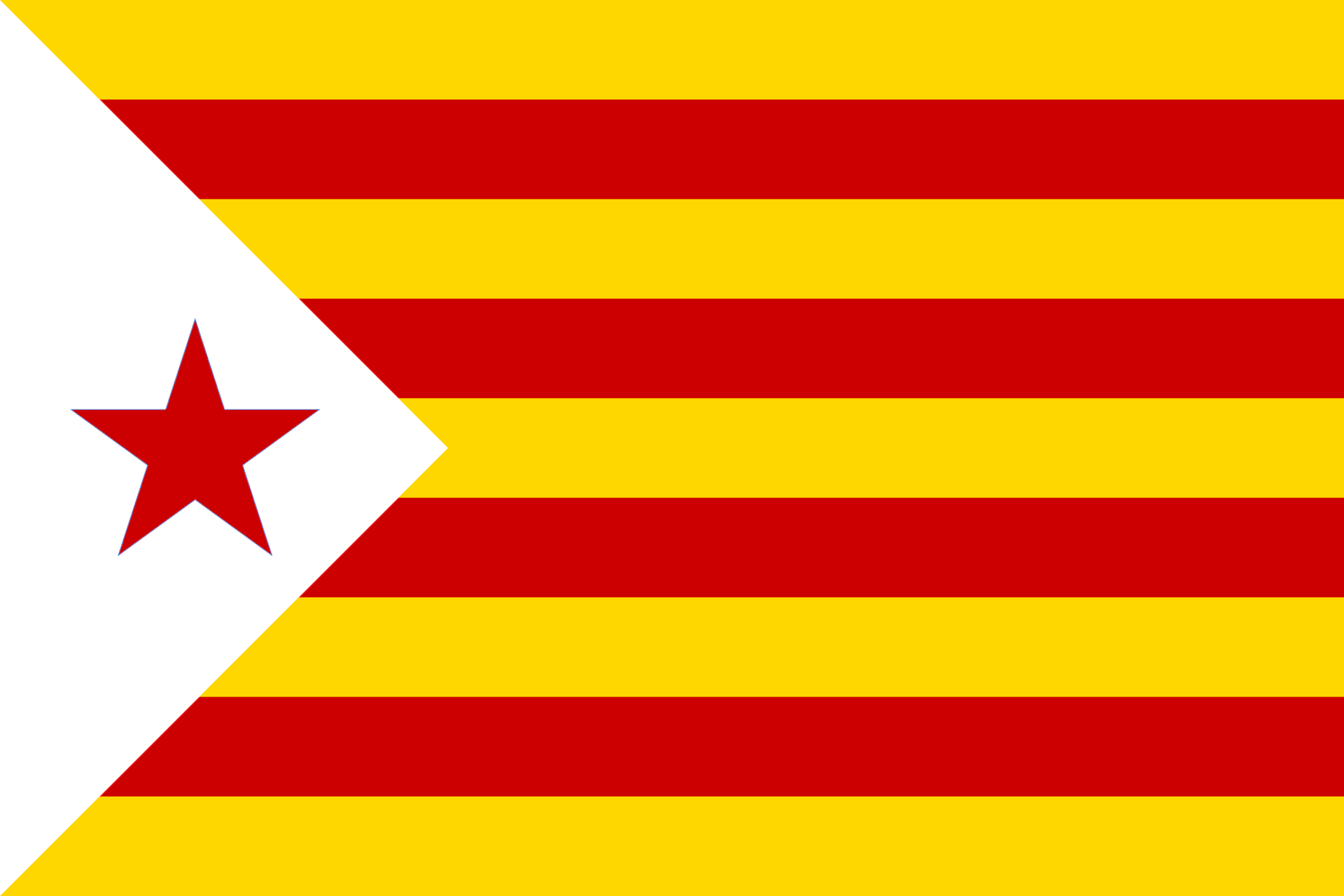
Estelada used by the PSAN (1968-1977), Marxist Unification Movement (1977-1978), Catalan Workers Bloc (1978-1982) and Left Bloc for National Liberation (1979-1982).

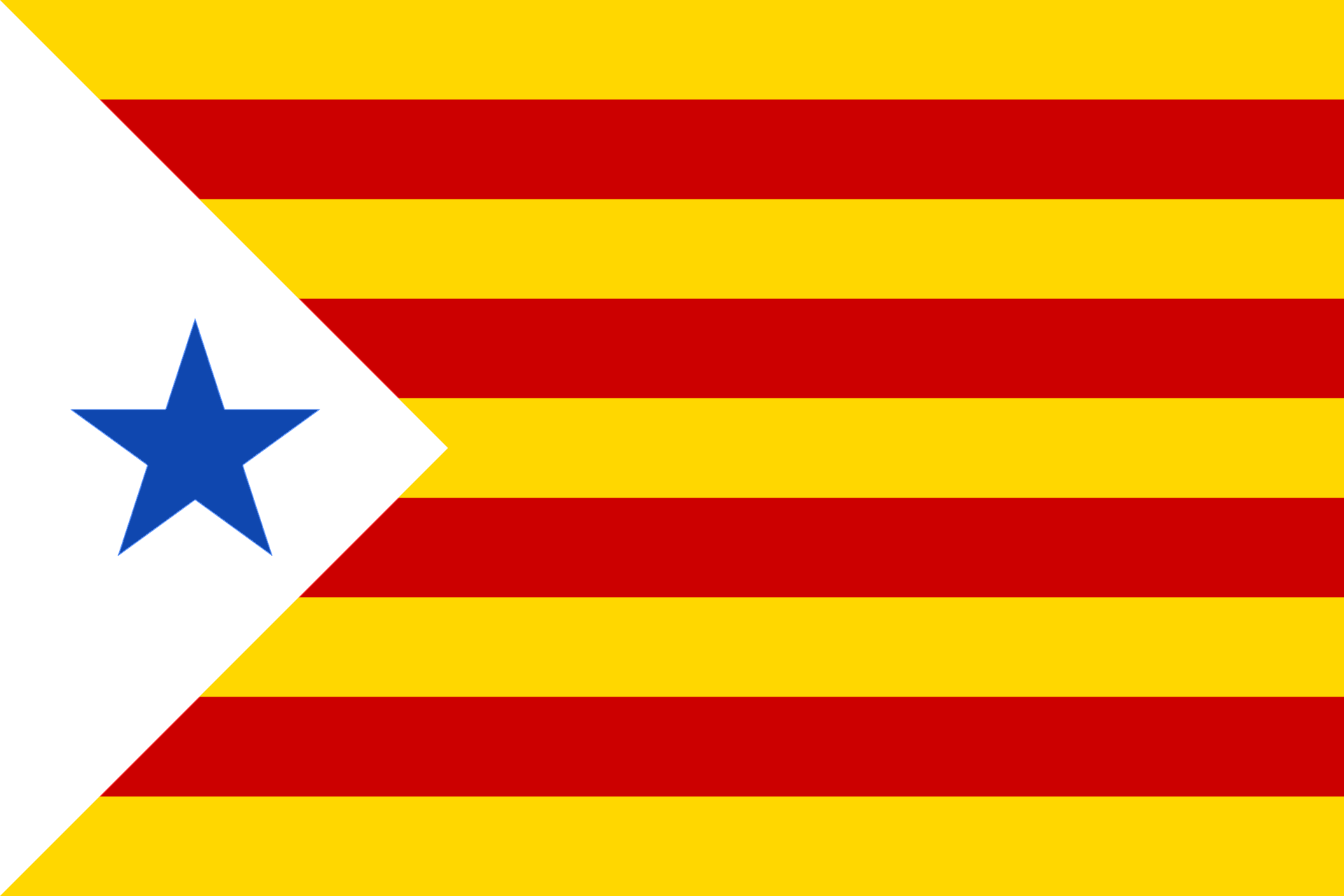
Estelada with blue star seen in Catalan student demonstrations in the 1970s

Estelada with 3 estrelles.

Estelada with sword, crown and 6 stars

This estelada inspired by the flag of the United States was proposed unsuccessfully in the late 60s.

Estelada used by the Catalan Patriotic Movement (1994-2000s).

Anarchist estelada, with an eight-pointed star, each representing the 8 regions of the Catalan Countries

This flag was intended in the past to become the flag of the independent Catalan Countries

Flag proposed (June 2017) by the Fundació Reeixida as the official flag of an independent Catalonia.

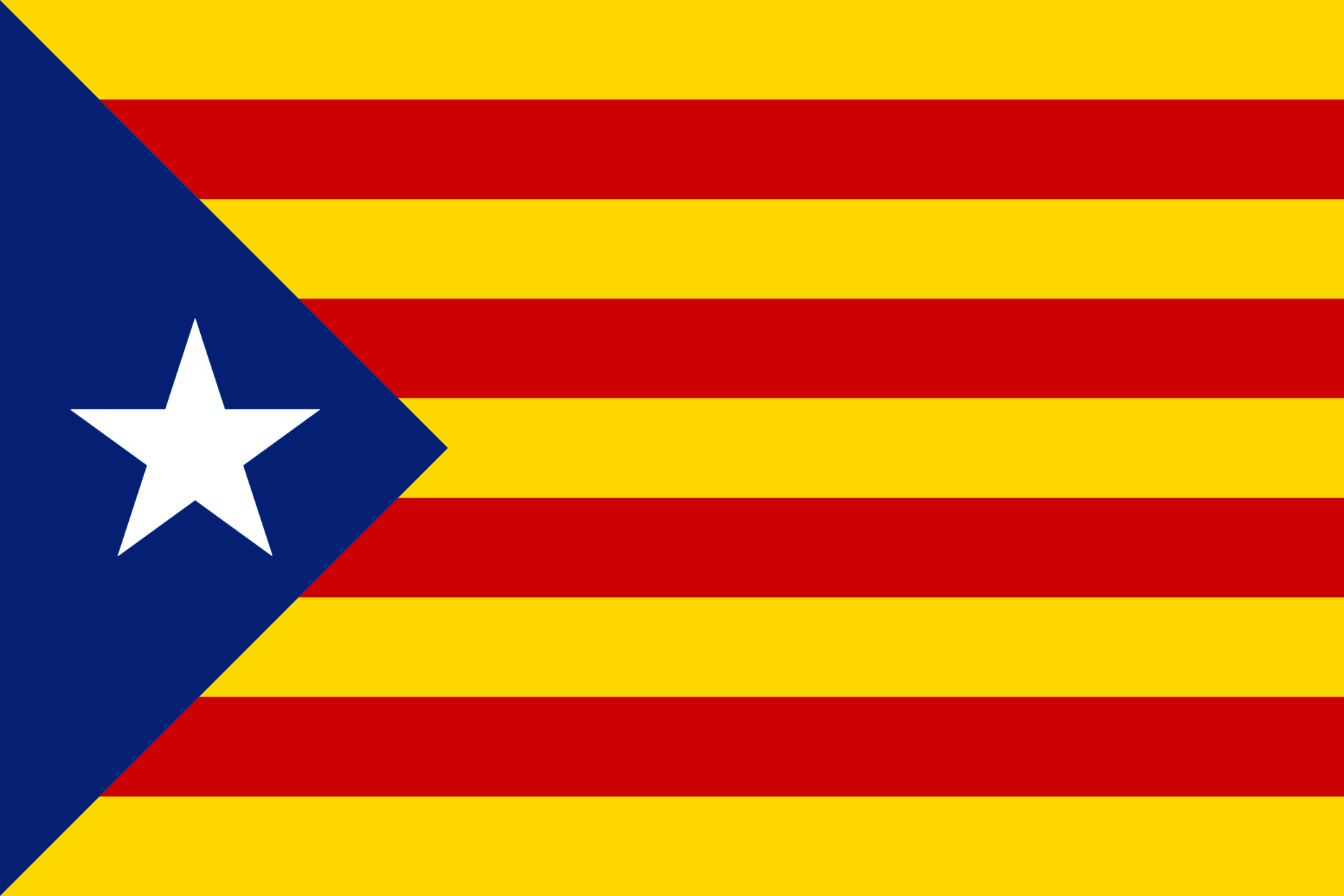
Estelada blau marí, dark blue version used with vertical displays in 2012.

Islamic version of Estelada Blava
