= Catalan National Committee =

Catalan separatist organization

Catalan National Committee was a Catalan separatist organization founded in Paris in 1918 by Daniel Domingo i Montserrat, commander of the First Regiment of Catalan Volunteers in World War I. The committee aimed at giving voice to the aspirations of the Catalan people following the speech of Francesc Macià in the Spanish Courts asking for independence based on the Fourteen Points of the United States President Woodrow Wilson. The organization was greeted the observer status in the Treaty of Versailles. On the 1918 National Day of Catalonia (Sept. 11) the committee published a trilingual (French-English-Catalan) brochures and organized various events asking for the presence of Catalonia in the League of Nations. The committee absorbed the Catalan Nationalist League organization and sought the support of American-based Catalans such as Salvador Carbonell i Puig and Josep Abril i Llinés. In 1923, its members formed the support committee to Catalan State in Paris.

== Bibliography ==
- David Martínez i Fiol The Catalan volunteers in the Great War (1914–1918) (in Catalan: Els voluntaris catalans a la Gran Guerra (1914–1918)), Publications of the Abbey of Montserrat, 1991, p.105-112
- David Martínez and Fiol Daniel Domingo Montserrat, 1900–1963: entre el marxisme i el nacionalisme], p. 58-82
- Joan Crexell i Playà The origin of the independentist flag (in Catalan: L'origen de la bandera independentista), p. 77-80, 1984, Ed. El Llamp.
