= Unió Catalanista =

Catalanist political party (1891-1936)

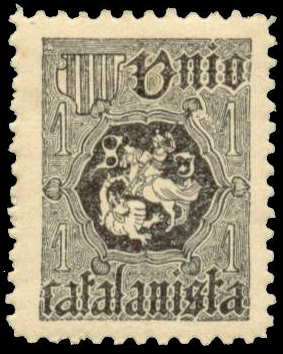
- Founded: 1891
- Dissolved: 1936
- Ideology: Catalanism, Conservatism (until 1903); Progressivism (from 1903)

The Unió Catalanista (in English: Catalanist Union) was a Catalanist political group, initially conservative, formed in Barcelona in 1891, from the union of various Catalanist trade unions and associations that came into contact as a result of the resistance against Article 15 of the Civil Code, which they considered to be an attack on Catalan civil law.

In 1892 they promoted the meeting at which the Bases de Manresa were approved. In 1893 it held a meeting in Reus, in 1894 in Balaguer and in 1895 in Olot. In 1897 it modified its statutes and was joined by new associations, groups, newspapers and individuals. The leadership was divided into two sectors, one that was not very politicised, grouped around the newspaper La Renaixensa, and the other more political, headed by Enric Prat de la Riba. The latter, who advocated participation in the political system, split from the Unió in 1899 and created the Centre Nacional Català under the presidency of Narcís Verdaguer. The Centre Nacional Català merged with the Unió Regionalista to form the Lliga Regionalista after its unitary candidacy known as the candidatura dels quatre presidents in 1901, when they were very successful in the elections.

The Unió Catalanista then called an assembly in Terrassa at which it decided to enter politics and ask for the economic agreement. In 1903, Domènec Martí i Julià, who steered the party to the left, became president. Martí left the presidency in 1906 but returned to it in 1914. In 1916, Martí proposed the dissolution of the organisation, which was not accepted and he left the group. From then on, the Unió went into a deep decline. In the 1932 regional elections it won a seat in the Catalan parliament, in coalition with the Republican Left of Catalonia. It continued to exist until 1936, after the outbreak of the Civil War.

== Bibliography ==
- Buffery, Helena; Marcer, Elisenda (2011). Historical Dictionary of the Catalans (in Spanish). The Scarecrow Press.
- del Cacho, Vicente (1998). El nacionalismo catalán como factor de modernización (in Spanish). Quaderns Crema.
- Gonzàlez i Vilalta, Arnau (2011). Cataluña bajo vigilancia. El consulado italiano y el fascio de Barcelona (1930-1943) (in Spanish). Universidad de Valencia. ISBN 978-84-370-8309-4.
- Guereña, Jean-Louis; Morales Muñoz, Manuel (2006). Los nacionalismos en la España contemporánea. Ideologías, movimientos y símbolos (in Spanish). Diputación de Málaga.
- Hernández Sánchez, Antonio (2000). Nacionalismo. Pasado, presente y futuro (in Spanish). Ediciones de la Universidad de Castilla-La Mancha.
- Pabón, Jesús (1999) [1952]. Cambó: 1876-1947 (in Spanish). Editorial Alpha. ISBN 84-7225-740-1.
- Tornafoch, Xavier (2002). Catalanisme, carlisme i republicanisme a Vic (1899-1909) (in Spanish). Publicacions de l'Abadia de Montserrat.
