= Agustí Chalaux i de Subirà =

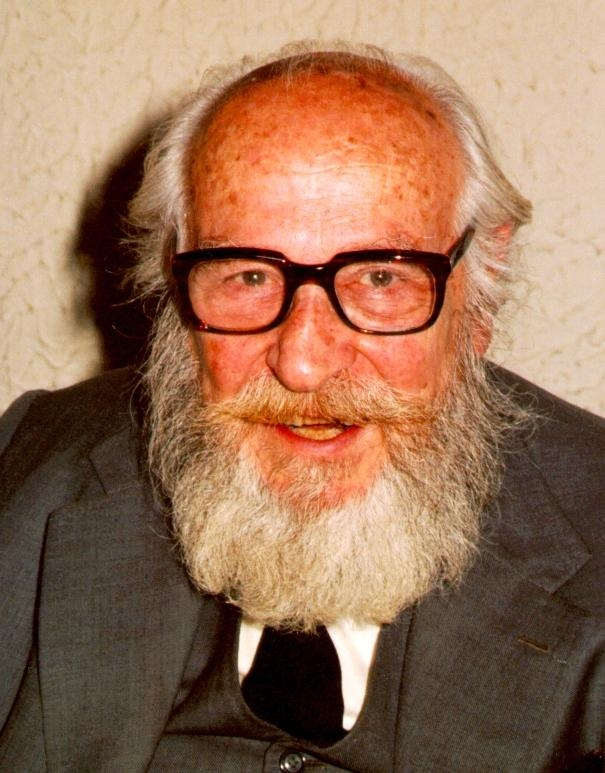
Agustí Chalaux i de Subirà (1911-2006)

Agustí Chalaux i de Subirà (Sant Genís dels Agudells, 1911, Barcelona 2006), was a Spanish thinker, who designed a political, economic and social model meant to reduce as much as possible the misuse of power, extreme poverty and corruption.

== Biography ==
He was born at Sant Genís dels Agudells (Catalonia, Spain), which was then a hamlet with 15 inhabitants near Barcelona, on 19 July 1911. His father was a French businessman who had a factory producing dyes for woollens in Almogàvers street, in Barcelona. His mother was from the Subirà family, with a Catalan Carlist tradition. When he was four he was sent to the Montessori school, one of the first to be opened in Europe. At nine years of age he was sent to France to study, where he stayed in Toulon until he finished high school.

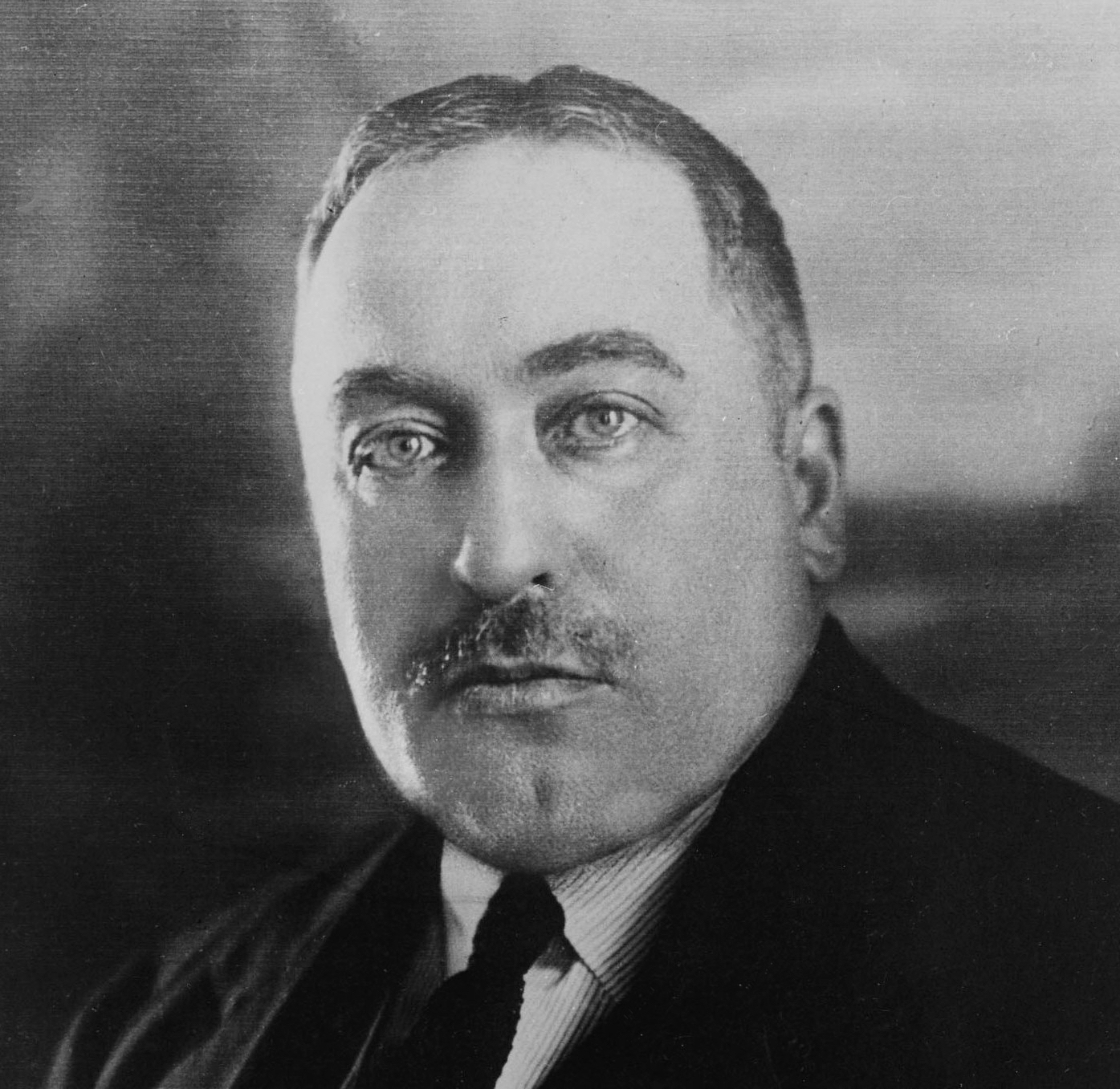
Horace Finaly (1871-1945)

When he was fourteen he met a banker, Horace Finaly, who exerted a great influence on him for the following fourteen years, and who suggested that he should study chemistry. Agustí Chalaux then followed this career in the Mulhouse School of Chemistry, where he learned the scientific method as applied to physical and chemical phenomena, which he used to start organizing the study of social and economic phenomena with the same accuracy and rigour.

He was in touch with Catalanist political groups first and then with libertarian groups. At the beginning of the Spanish Civil War he lived in Barcelona, where he carried on his observations and studies, while working at the same time in the family factory, which was never nationalized nor collectivized, teaming up with the trade-unions, who called him «Xaló».

In 1939 he went into exile to Paris, where he was caught up by Second World War. He was mobilized in the Artillery School for officers, and after the German occupation of the country, the French government, at whose head was Pétain, demobilized him and he resumed his studies.

He returned to Catalonia in 1945. He was a regular reader of «La Semana Internacional» («The International week»), a magazine published in Chile by Joan Bardina, who also had an influence on him.

In 1956, after the occupation of Hungary, he reached the conclusion that violence was the wrong path for the introduction of a political change.

In 1968 he left his job as a chemist. He took part in the «Universitat al Carrer» («Street University»), which later was officially renamed «Institut de Cultura Popular» («Institute of Popular Culture»).

With Lluís Maria Xirinacs and other persons, a new association was created to study his new political, economic and social model, and in 1984 they founded the «Centre d’Estudis Joan Bardina» («Joan Bardina Study Centre»), which had its offices in the old family factory.

Among others he published the following books: «Assaig sobre moneda, mercat i societat» («Essay on currency, market and society»), and «Moneda telemàtica i estratègia de mercat» («Telematic currency and market strategy»). In the document «Disseny de Civisme» («Civism Project») he gave shape to his suggested programme.

Agustí Chalaux died in Barcelona on 26 April 2006.

== Related works ==
- «Introducció al sistema general» («Introduction to general system»), (Catalan) together with Magdalena Grau Figueras, September 11, 1983.
- «Una eina per a construir la pau» («An instrument to build peace»), (in English, Catalan, Spanish and French), July 1, 1984.
- «Assaig sobre moneda, mercado i societat» («Essay on currency, market and society»), in English, Catalan and (Spanish), with Magdalena Grau Figueras, 1984.
- «Moneda telemàtica i estratègia de mercat» («Telematic currency and market strategy»), (in English, Catalan, Spanish, French and Italian), together with Magdalena Grau Figueras, 1985.
- «Glossari de termes inequívocs» («A glossary of unequivocal terms»), (Catalan), 1986.
- «Disseny de civisme» («Civism project»), (Catalan), 1988.
- «La plutarquia i altres relats» («Plutarchy and Other Tales»), (in English, Catalan, Spanish, Italian and Romanian), 1991.
- Martí Olivella Solé, «El poder del diner» («The power of money»), (in English, Catalan, Spanish and Italian). Joaquim Xirau Award in 1991.
- «Sistema General: "Economia i Societat" (En seixanta punts)» («General system: "Economics and Society", In sixty items»), (Catalan), together with Lluís Maria Xirinacs, December 6, 1996.
- «El capitalisme comunitari» («Communal Capitalism»), (in English, Catalan, Spanish, French, Italian, German, Galician and Esperanto), February 12, 2000.
- «Història del capitalisme comunitari» («The History of Community Capitalism»), (in English, Catalan and Spanish), February 17, 2001.
