= Lluís Maria Xirinacs =

Catalan cleric and politician (1932–2007)

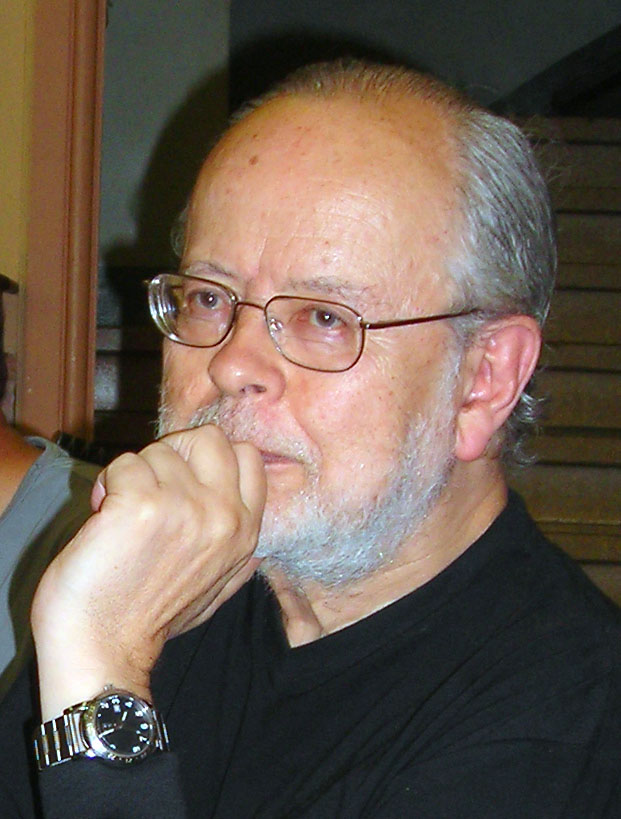
Lluís Maria Xirinacs

Lluís Maria Xirinacs i Damians (Catalan pronunciation: [ʎuˈiz məˈɾi.ə ʃiɾiˈnaks]; 6 August 1932 – 11 August 2007) was a Catalan politician, writer, catholic cleric and advocate for the independence of Catalonia.

== Biography ==
He was born in Barcelona in 1932, and he became a priest when he was 22. In 1990 he abandoned the priesthood.

In the 1960s and 1970s, he conducted several hunger strikes, the first a long one against the relationship between church and state in Francoist Spain. He was imprisoned twice (1972 and 1974–75). He declared himself a follower of Gandhi's ideals and employed non-violence in his struggles. For example, he spent twelve hours a day for a year and nine months standing in front of a Barcelona prison until the approval of an amnesty law for political prisoners. As a result of all these actions, he was nominated for the Nobel Peace Prize every year from 1975 to 1977.

In 1977, in the first Spanish elections after the end of Francoist Spain, he became senator for Barcelona as an independent candidate. In 1979, he was a candidate for the Spanish Congress of Deputies in a coalition known as Left Bloc of National Freedom (Bloc d'Esquerra d'Alliberament Nacional or BEAN). This reinvigorated the spirit of the former Assembly of Catalonia, of which he also was one of the main promoters. Later on, BEAN presented candidates in the 1980 Catalan Parliament elections; but, in both cases, it did not obtain any representation.

"Fundació Tercera Via" (Third-Way Foundation), currently "Fundació Randa-Lluís M. Xirinacs" (Randa-Lluís Maria Xirinacs Foundation) was founded on 27 October 1987, by Xirinacs and a group of his friends.

By 1980, he left active party politics. In 1984, along with Agustí Chalaux, he founded the Centre d'Estudis Joan Bardina, where he wanted to explore deeper into a new economical, political and social model.

In 1990 he abandoned his priesthood vows. In 2000, he started to protest again, sitting in Plaça Sant Jaume daily for the independence of the Catalan Countries.

When he was 65, he was awarded a PhD in philosophy.

In 2005 he was sentenced to 2 years in prison for glorifying terrorism.

== Trial ==
On 11 September 2002, within the National Day of Catalonia reivindicative speeches in Fossar de les Moreres, he declared:

«Gandhi deia que el no-violent no pot tractar amb neutralitat les parts d'un conflicte violent: l'aggressor és l'enemic, l'agredit és l'amic, tot i que sigui violent. Jo he intentat tota la vida lluitar per la via no violenta. Però declaro aquí, i ho dic ben alt, per si hi ha cap policia o cap fiscal: em declaro enemic de l'estat espanyol i amic d'ETA i de Batasuna(...) «hay estilos, porque ETA, como está en guerra, mata, pero no arranca uñas. Yo he estado en prisión con gente de ETA con las uñas arrancadas. ETA mata pero no tortura. En cambio Lasa y Zabala murieron torturados. ETA, cuando tira una bomba en un lugar que puede herir a gente que no son militares o que no estén relacionados con los opresores avisa. ¿Sabéis lo que cuesta robar la dinamita, pagarla, transportarla, colocarla, y encima cuando tienen todo a punto avisa que la desactiven? ¿Por qué hace esto? Lo hace porque aún conserva un poco de nobleza del estilo de Ginebra y la conserva porque los otros no la han maleado mas. Por que lleva le gente de ETA una vida de ratas, de escondidos, de cloacas, perseguidos. No pueden tener novias, no pueden tener hijos, no pueden ir al cine, no pueden tener nada y si a veces hieren a algún inocente, no es su voluntad».». "Gandhi said that the nonviolent cannot deal with the parts of a violent conflict with neutrality: the aggressor is the enemy, the attacked one is the friend, although he may be violent. I have tried all my life the fight by non-violent means. Nevertheless, I declare here and, I say it aloud, in the case there could be any police or public prosecutor: I declare myself enemy of the Spanish State and friend of ETA and Batasuna (...) Because ETA, although in a war, kills but does not tear out fingernails. I have been in prison with ETA people that had their fingernails torn out. ETA kills, but does not torture. In change, Lasa and Zabala died being tortured. ETA, when it throws a bomb in a place where it can harm people that are not soldiers or are not related to the oppressors, gives a warning. Do you know how much does it cost to steal dynamite, pay it, transport it, place it, and after that, when all is ready, they give a warning so it is deactivated? Why do they? They do this because they keep a little bit of the nobility of the Geneva kind, and they keep it because the others did not corrupt it. Because people of ETA have a life like that of rats, a life of hiding, of seweries, persecuted. They cannot have girlfriends, cannot have children, they cannot go to the cinema, they cannot have anything, and if sometimes they wound some innocent person, it was not their intention."

After this, Xirinacs was sentenced to two years of prison and four years of incapacitation by the Spanish Audiencia Nacional, accused of ennobling terrorism.

On 17 December 2002, he stated to the jury in his defence:

"No crec que sigui delicte fer feina d'historiador (de la qual es pot discrepar): -de descriure una guerra d'alliberament nacional que dura ja quaranta anys, -i de comparar-la amb altres guerres."
"I don't think that working as a historian (with whom one may disagree) is any crime: -describing a war for national freedom that has lasted now for 40 years, -and comparing it with other wars."

And he also added:

«Són els tancs espanyols que ocupen el País Basc. Cap arma basca no vol conquerir Espanya.»
"It is the Spanish tanks that are occupying the Basque Country. No Basque weapon wants to conquer Spain".

Madrid's National Court tried him in absentia (Xirinacs failed to appear) and sentenced him to two years in prison for glorifying terrorism. On 25 October 2005, when he was 74, he was arrested by Spanish Police when he visited Ciutat Vella commissary in order to renew his identity document. Two days later, he was sent to prison, but in the very same afternoon, the Attorney General decided to free him, invoking humanitarian reasons due to his age.

In 2004, Catalan Summer University awarded him the Canigó prize. During that time, he continued his political commitment within Fundació Randa.

Randa-Lluís Maria Xirinacs Foundation is continuing his legacy and tries to disseminate Xirinacs proposals for personal and collective liberation, which include a philosophical model: Globàlium, short model and great model.

== Death ==
On 11 August 2007, he was found dead in the woods Ogassa, Ripollès, having committed suicide according to some sources., even if the autopsy confirmed it was not. He left a note in his workplace explaining his decision, where he criticized the cowardice of Catalan politicians:

Act of sovereignty

I have lived 75 years in the Catalan Countries
occupied by Spain, France – and Italy- for centuries
fighting against this slavery during all of my adult life.
A slave nation, a slave human being,
shame for Humanity and the Universe.
But a Nation will never be free
if her sons do not want to risk
their lives in her defence and liberation.
My friends, accept this final victorious end
of my combat to stress the fearfulness
of our leaders, who make masses out of People.
Today, my Nation becomes absolute sovereign in me.
They have lost a slave
she is a little more free
because I am in you, my friends!
Lluís M. Xirinacs i Damians, Barcelona, August 6, 2007

== Discography ==
- Carlo Forlivesi, En la Soledat i el Silenci (2007–2008), a musical composition in three movements for koto and guitar. The title "En la Soledat i el Silenci" (In Solitude and in Silence) is a quotation from the last writing of Lluís Maria Xirinacs. The piece is included in the CD album Silenziosa Luna – 沈黙の月 (ALCD 76).

== See also ==
- List of peace activists
