= Sant Genís dels Agudells =

Coordinates: 41°25′42.62″N 2°7′57.17″E

- Neighborhood of Barcelona
- Interactive map of Sant Genís dels Agudells
- Country: Spain
- Autonomous community: Catalonia
- Province: Barcelona
- Comarca: Barcelonès
- Municipality: Barcelona
- District: Horta-Guinardó

Area
  - Total: 1.716 km^{2} (0.663 sq mi)

Population
  - Total: 6,828
  - Density: 3,979/km^{2} (10,310/sq mi)

Sant Genís dels Agudells (Catalan pronunciation: [ˈsan ʒəˈniz ðəlz əɣuˈðeʎs]) is a neighborhood in the Horta-Guinardó district of Barcelona, Catalonia (Spain).
