= Joan Bardina Castarà =

Spanish-Chilean theorist of education

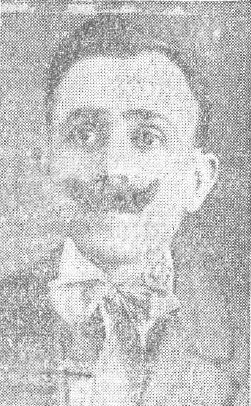
- Born: 27 May 1877; Sant Boi de Llobregat, Barcelona, Spain
- Died: 7 October 1950 (aged 73); Valparaíso, Chile
- Citizenship: Spain, Chile
- Education: PhD
- Occupations: publisher, scholar, writer, Law Professor
- Known for: theorist of education
- Political party: Carlism, Lliga Regionalista

Joan Doménec Bardina Castarà (Spanish: Juan Bardina Castará) (1877-1950) was a Spanish-Chilean theorist of education, acknowledged for his innovative approach to pedagogy and for his contribution to renewal of the Catalan schooling system. In Chile he is known also as a scholar in law; in Spain, and especially in Catalonia, he is recognized as a member of the Catalanist movement. Active in Carlism during his youth, he is considered a typical case of a transitional political identity, moving from Carlism to peripheral nationalism. Increasingly concerned with social issues, by the end of his life he sympathized with Francoism and Nazism; he also focused more on his extended family and became increasingly religious. His manuals, published anonymously and related mostly to health, hygiene and cuisine, were fairly popular in Spain in the 1920s and 1930s.

== Family and youth ==
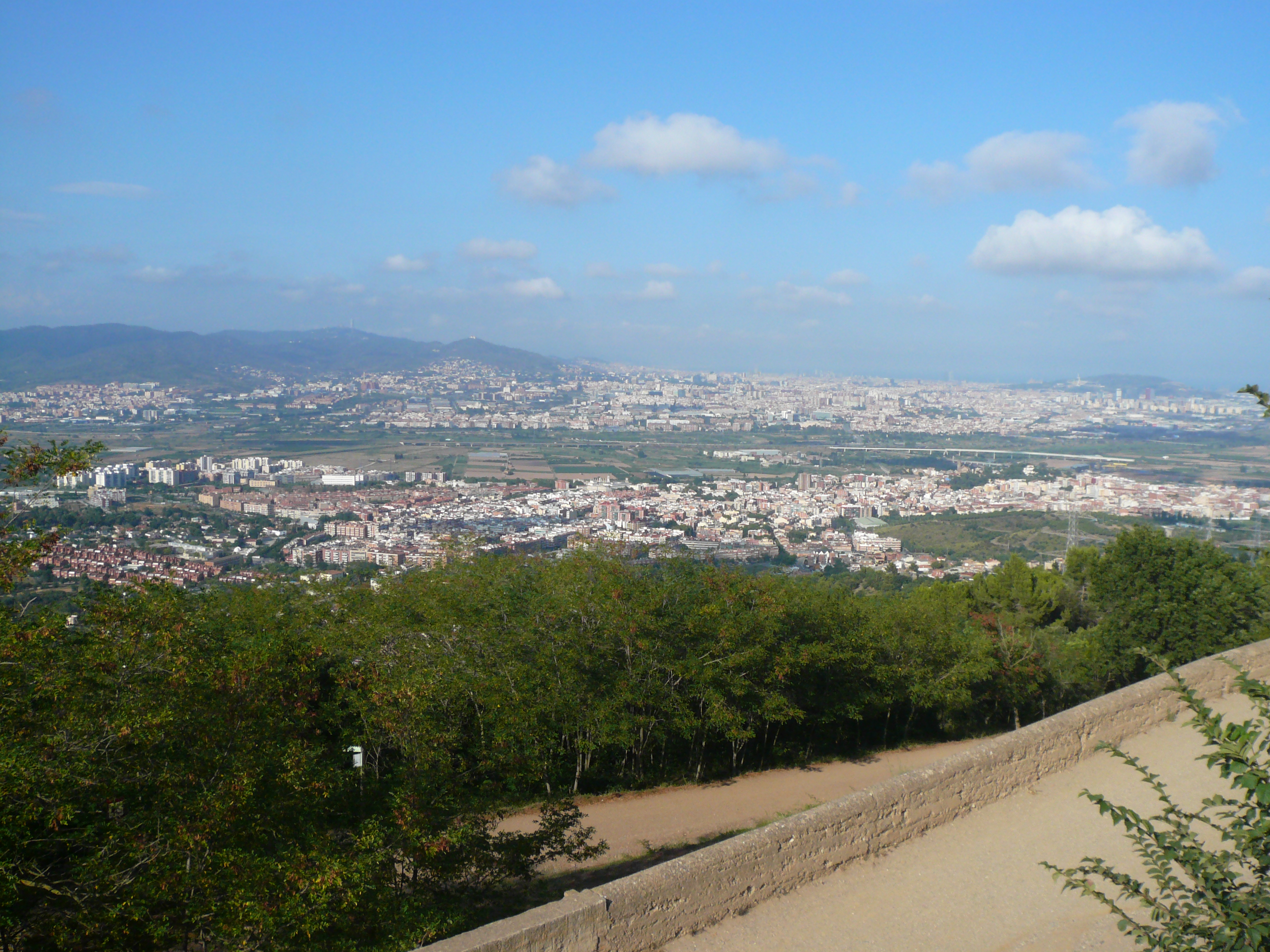
Sant Boi de Llobregat

Joan Bardina Castarà descended from a Catalan family. His paternal grandparents, Josep Bardina and Maria Savarich, lived in a Pyrenean "village of Santa Creu" Llogaret de Santa Creu located in the region of Urgel SW of Andorra, Alto Urgel county, and had 12 children. The youngest of them, Joan Bardina Savarich (died 1891), left the family home early and in search of work settled in Sant Boi de Llobregat, a town at the outskirts of Barcelona. It is there where he commenced working, first as a locksmith and then as a blacksmith. He married a local girl, Dolores Castarà Sigró. She also came from a humble, though somewhat better positioned family; her parents, Josep Castarà Marigó and María Ciuró (originally Sigró) Puig, were handicraftsmen specializing in lace-making; especially the latter was recognized in the town. The newly married couple had one child, a daughter, before Dolores died. A widower, Joan married her younger sister, Josepa Castarà Ciuró. They had 4 children, Josepa, Joan, Baldiri and Magdalena.

Educated in a kindergarten, at the age of 5 Joan was able to read and write. In 1884 he moved to elementary school, excelling as an extraordinary student. It was the headmaster who suggested that the boy pursues a more ambitious career. In line with the advice, in 1887 Joan entered the Barcelona seminary. He kept collecting awards until the mid-1890s, as a teenager developing interest in photography, folk customs and tourism. However, path towards an ecclesiastical career was abruptly abandoned. Trying his hand in local journals, Bardina published a pamphlet deemed disrespectful towards the cardinal Sancha y Hervás; he considered a heavy reprimand received unfair. When his work on Kant, winning the first prize at a Valencia Seminary contest, was declared arrogant in his home seminary, in 1898 Bardina left the school. He obtained bachillerato in 1899 in Instituto de Girona and graduated in philosophy and letters from University of Barcelona in 1900. Himself exempted from military service, in 1901 he volunteered to spare conscription of his sickly brother Baldiri. At that time he was already trying to make a living by contributing to Barcelona periodicals and publishing own booklets.

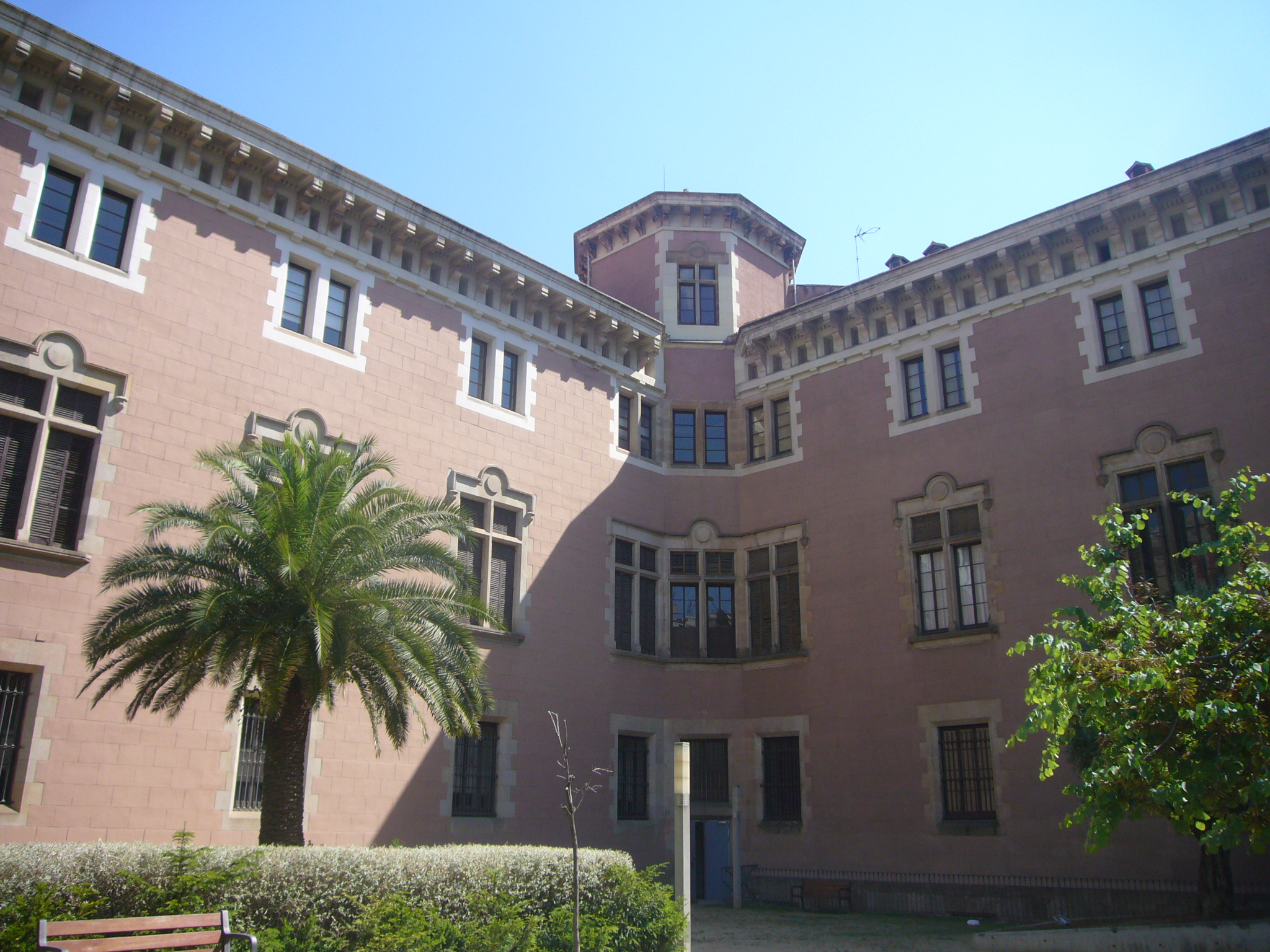
Barcelona seminary

In 1906 Bardina married Josepa Soronellas Brosé (1880-1910), a feminist activist; her father was involved in housekeeping, printing and distribution of a periodical Bardina worked with. In 1907 their only child, Remedios (Reimei) Bardina Soronellas, was born. The girl initially lived with her parents and then with her widowed father in Barcelona, after his departure to stay with her grandmother. Remedios was the first female law graduate of the University of Barcelona and among the first three female PhD graduates from the University of Madrid, to gain another PhD from the University of Berlin. She married Yen Huai Liu, a fellow PhD student from China. In the 1930s the couple settled in China and later, together with seven children, in Taiwan. In 1921, already in Chile, Bardina remarried with a local girl Raquel Venegas (born 1902); none of the sources consulted offers any information on her family. The couple had 4 children, Joan, Raquel, Rebeca and Marta, born between 1922 and 1927. Joan Bardina Venegas married Yolanda Carvajal from Peumo, Chile, in 1946 and had four children: Yoli (1948), Juan (1949), Jorge (1950) and Veronica Remei (1954). All of Joan Bardina Castara's grandchildren married and had a total of 25 great-grandchildren;

== Carlist ==
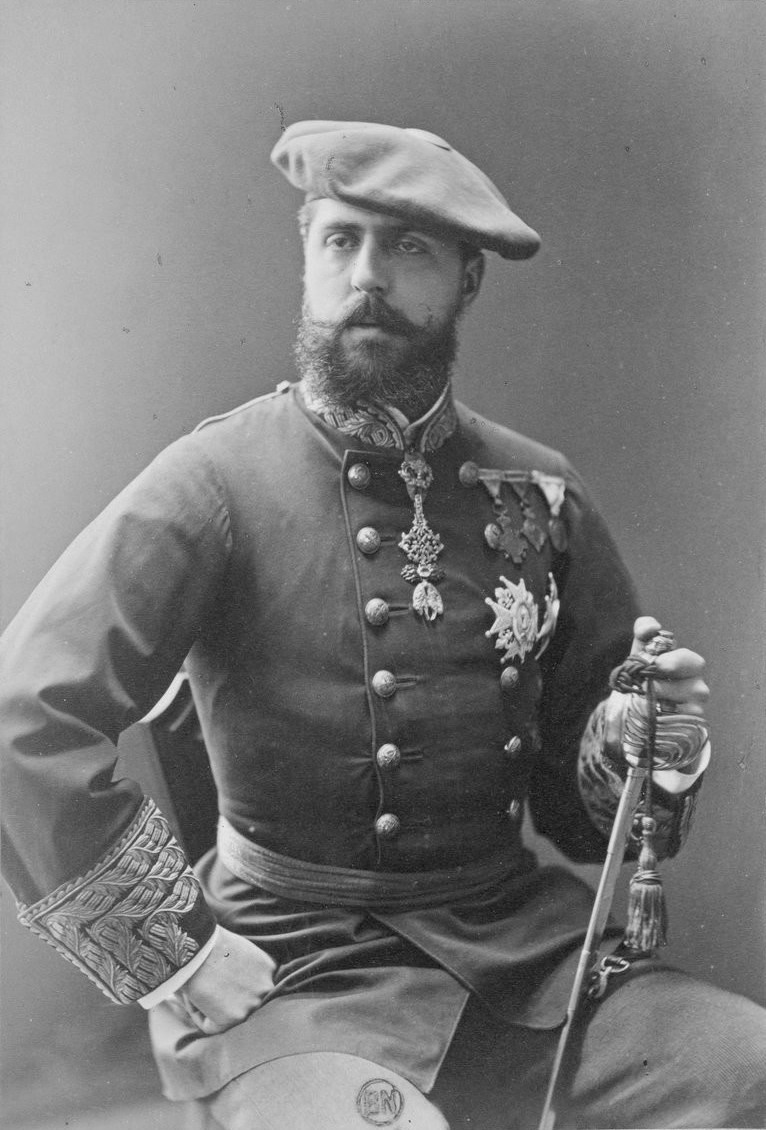
Carlos VII

Bardina did not demonstrate political sympathies until the mid-1890s; influenced by the spirit of fellow seminarians, he neared Carlism. In 1895 he published first poems in the Carlist press, signed with a histrionic pen-name "Valcarlos", and kept contributing to various Traditionalist titles; his pieces featured belligerent tone and scarce maturity. In 1897 he co-founded the Barcelona section of Joventut Escolar Tradicionalista, an activity which triggered correspondence between the minister of justice and ecclesiastic authorities. The same year Bardina joined a newly launched Carlist satirical weekly in Catalan, Lo Mestre Titas, and quickly emerged as one of its key contributors.

Lo Mestre Titas remained on the margins of the Catalan Carlism, ignored by the regional party mouthpiece, El Correo Catalan; its heterodoxy consisted of unusually militant tone, regionalism exceeding the standard party levels, and antipathy towards the regional leader Llauder. Bardina's contributions fell into 3 fields: lambasting Liberal governments, discussing political stand of the Church, and promoting Catalanism; he wrote poetry and essays. His advances against pro-Alfonsist course of the Church cost Bardina a conflict with seminarian superiors and led to leaving the seminary. His zealous, Carlism-formatted Catalanism cost Bardina a conflict with periodicals close to Unió Catalanista; it also cost Bardina a conflict with Llauder, who considered his Catalanist-Carlist propaganda beyond the party orthodoxy.

The climax of Bardina's Carlist engagement fell on 1899-1900, when he published an unorthodox biography of Aparisi Guijarro, first volume of an intended series on history of Carlism and two treaties discussing his vision of Carlist Catalonia; they raised many eyebrows, and in 1900 Llauder explicitly prohibited Bardina propagating his Catalanist-Carlist outlook. Militant tone of Lo Mestre Titas brought administrative fines, which in April 1900 led to disappearance of the title. Bardina was trialed for instigating to rebellion and fined; indeed by scholars he is considered representative of a “catastrophist” approach.

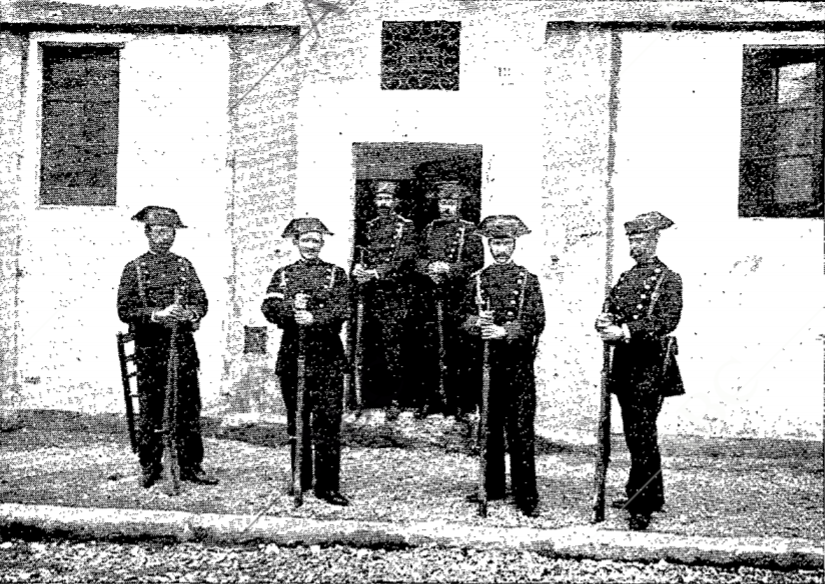
La Octubrada

It is not clear whether Bardina took part in Carlist military gear-up to overthrow the regime in 1899-1900; his publications, including a self-devised infantry tactical rulebook, were clearly pointing in this direction. The conspiracy boiled down to few isolated attempts in October 1900, and most of those detained afterwards were Bardina's friends. He was profoundly disappointed by ambiguous stand of the claimant, whose official condemnation of those involved alienated Bardina further on. His Carlism started to assume increasingly offshoot tone. In 1901-1902 he was engaged in El Cañón, an even more heterodox successor of Lo Mestre Titas, and niche Catholic periodicals La Barretina and Luz Católica. He might have been involved in conspiracy to replace Don Carlos with his son, Don Jaime. In a symbolic gesture, he shortened his pen-name from “Valcarlos” to “Val”. Bardina's anti-regime stand cost him another detention; he was spared sanctions thanks to private links. In 1903 he openly lambasted Carlist executive for ineptitude. Ridiculed by the party press as ex-Carlista, Bardina declared having been a Traditionalist but never a Carlist, and in his later booklet openly challenged the “Carlo-traitors”.

== Between Carlism and Catalanism ==
Carlist standard

Support for historical territorial identities and for loose organization of state has been major component of the Carlist vision; initially it seemed that Bardina's view on the Catalan question was firmly anchored within this outlook. Feeling profoundly Catalan, in line with orthodox Carlism he confronted the emerging Catalan nationalism as a chaotic medley; lacking tradition and social base, according to Bardina it was advocated by a handful of intellectuals and students, indulging in sectarian exaltation and producing discord. Tending to separatism, they were “descendants of the federalists and republicans in political terms, atheists in religious terms, and Jacobins in social terms”. The only viable offer for Catalonia – Bardina argued - was this of Carlos VII, who already in the 1870s hailed Catalan identity and pledged to restore traditional regional establishments. Writing to Lo Mestre Titas, Bardina engaged in hostile exchange of arguments with Catalanist periodicals La Renaixensa or La Nació Catalana, lambasting their anti-Carlism.

By the turn of the centuries militant and zealous Bardina's tone gave way to somewhat moderated polemics, mostly with Enric Prat de la Riba; discussing differences of programs and contradictory positions of Carlism and nationalist Catalanism, he abandoned earlier venom. Declaring himself a Catalanist and a Carlist at the same time, he criticized the latter for scarce use of Catalan, provincial organization, cuñerismo, and giving precedence to Rey over Patria. Bardina's treaties published started to stress an autonomous concept of Catalonia. Though explicitly rejecting full political independence in favor of a self-government, his vision was mounted in a general, federal or confederal view of an Iberian Peninsula as a conglomerate of kingdoms, principates, señorios and other entities. Such Catalonia would be a confessional Catholic entity with an own concordat, with freemasonry banned and no freedom of religion. It would be based on democratic principles, including political parties and universal suffrage, crowned with own Catalan parliament; the only official language would be Catalan.

Catalan standard

Though Carlism adopted an ambiguous position on the question of autonomy and though federative concepts were vaguely advanced by some key Carlist pundits, definitive and adamant stand of Bardina was barely acceptable for the party executives. Aware of this skepticism, in 1900 Bardina declared he was prepared to abandon the Carlists if they adopt a centralist position. His relations with Prat de la Riba changed into rapprochement, acknowledged by his contributions to La Veu de Catalunya and other similarly formatted periodicals. In late 1902 he was entrusted with drafting educational program of Lliga Regionalista and in 1904 entered its Comisión de Escuelas, though Bardina is not known to have held any posts in the party. In the mid-1900s he was already within the “intellectuales orgánicos” circle of Prat de la Riba, individuals staying clear of politics but engaged in ground-level work within the conservative, bourgeoisie Catalanism. Starting mid-1900 Bardina was to engage in a variety of Catalanist educational initiatives, be it congresses, lectures, newspapers, schools, self-governmental or private institutions and various associations.

== Catalanist educator ==
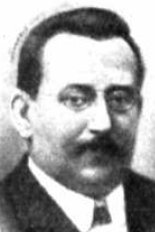
Enric Prat de la Riba

Apart from work as a private tutor in well-to-do Barcelona families Bardina had no experience as to education, though he grew enthusiastic about the subject and befriended individuals from the scholarly realm; among them were the Giner de los Rios brothers, chief promoters of Krausism in Spain. His interest in Catalanism and education led to taking part in the 1903 Congreso Universitario Catalán, one of mushrooming Catalanist education-related initiatives. He offered own views on a future Catalan academic system, declaring also that all primary education should be in Catalan. At the time La Lliga attempted to re-format education system along Catalanist lines; one of the instruments envisioned was Patronato de Escuelas, intended to supervise a network of Catalan schools for the working class. Starting 1904 Bardina worked closely with Prat de la Riba to finalize the project; eventually La Lliga failed to push it through the Catalan self-governing bodies.

In the mid-1900s Bardina was contemplating educative plans of his own; he launched Biblioteca Escolar Moderna, a series intended to provide comprehensive textbooks. His most notable initiative was a college for future teachers. As Hermenegildo Giner de los Rios was teniente de alcalde in the Barcelona ayuntamiento, the plan got heavily subsidized by municipal and provincial authorities and materialized as Escola de Mestres in 1906. Allocated prestigious premises, well-staffed and perfectly equipped, it was a fusion of Krausism and Catalanism, with Lliguista political designs in the background. With some 40 teenagers pursuing the curriculum every year, it became “Institució única en la história de l’educació catalana”. In 1908 Bardina opened another school, Collegio del Remei, where first alumni of Escola de Mestres assumed teaching. The period was marked by his hectic activities; Bardina took part in linguistic and pedagogic congresses, published textbooks, launched periodicals, gave lectures and set up new institutions. He remained engaged in numerous self-governmental activities. The most important of them was Presupuesto Extraordinario de Cultura, a long term educational project developed by the Barcelona city council and launched in 1908. Asked by Prat de la Riba to work on the document a few years earlier, Bardina heavily contributed to its pedagogical section, mostly within the Krausist-Catalanist framework and occasionally assuming a somewhat anti-conservative flavor.

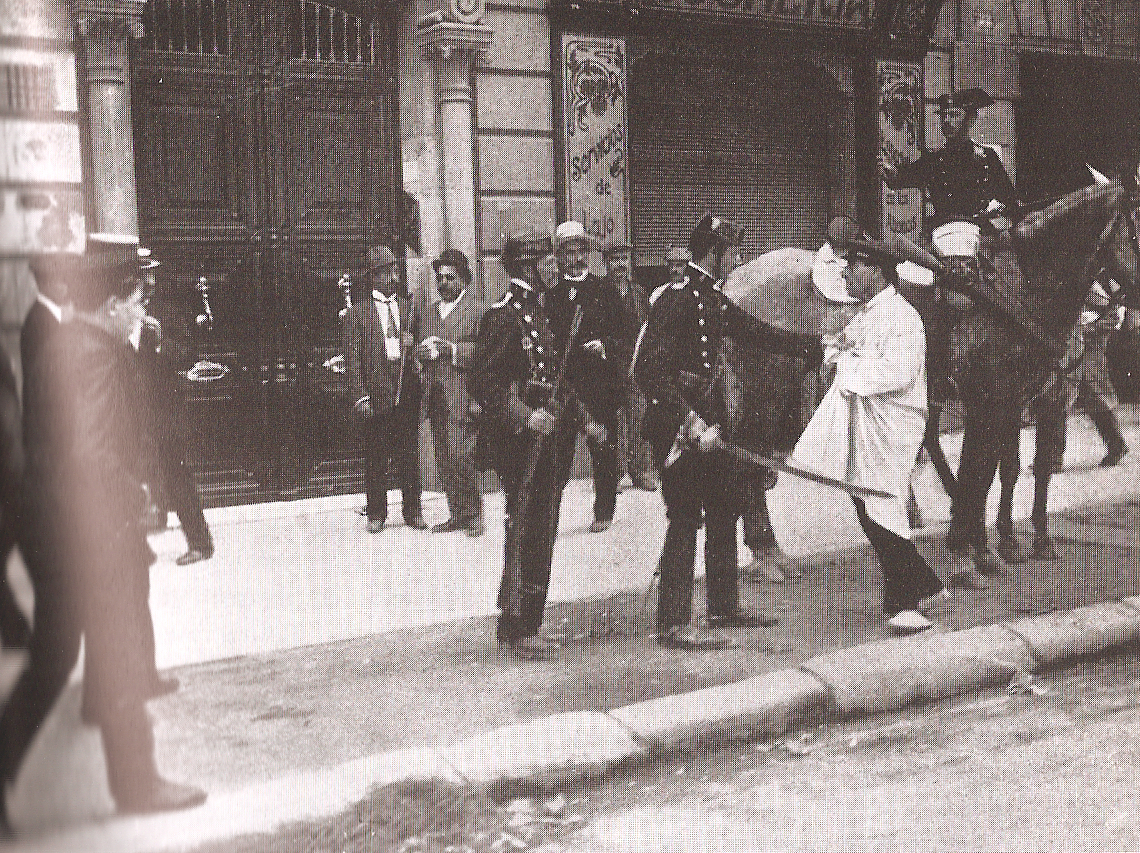
Barcelona, Semana Trágica

In the summer of 1909 Barcelona and Catalonia were rocked by Anarchist-dominated and anti-religious riots, known as Semana Trágica. With army restoring order and massive casualties, political establishment took a decisively conservative turn; also Prat de la Riba and La Lliga re-considered the question of alliances and enemies. Liberal educational initiatives became the focus of suspicion. The Presupuesto project was cancelled by the civil governor. Francesc Ferrer Guardia, founder of Escuela Moderna, was sentenced and executed; also Bardina got ostracized and stigmatized, and police developed interest in his activities. 1909 marks the breakup date between him and Prat de la Riba. Subsidies for Bardina's projects dried out. Unable to cope financially on their own, both Escola de Mestres and Collegio del Remei closed in 1910; Bardina became sort of an outcast.

== At the crossroads ==
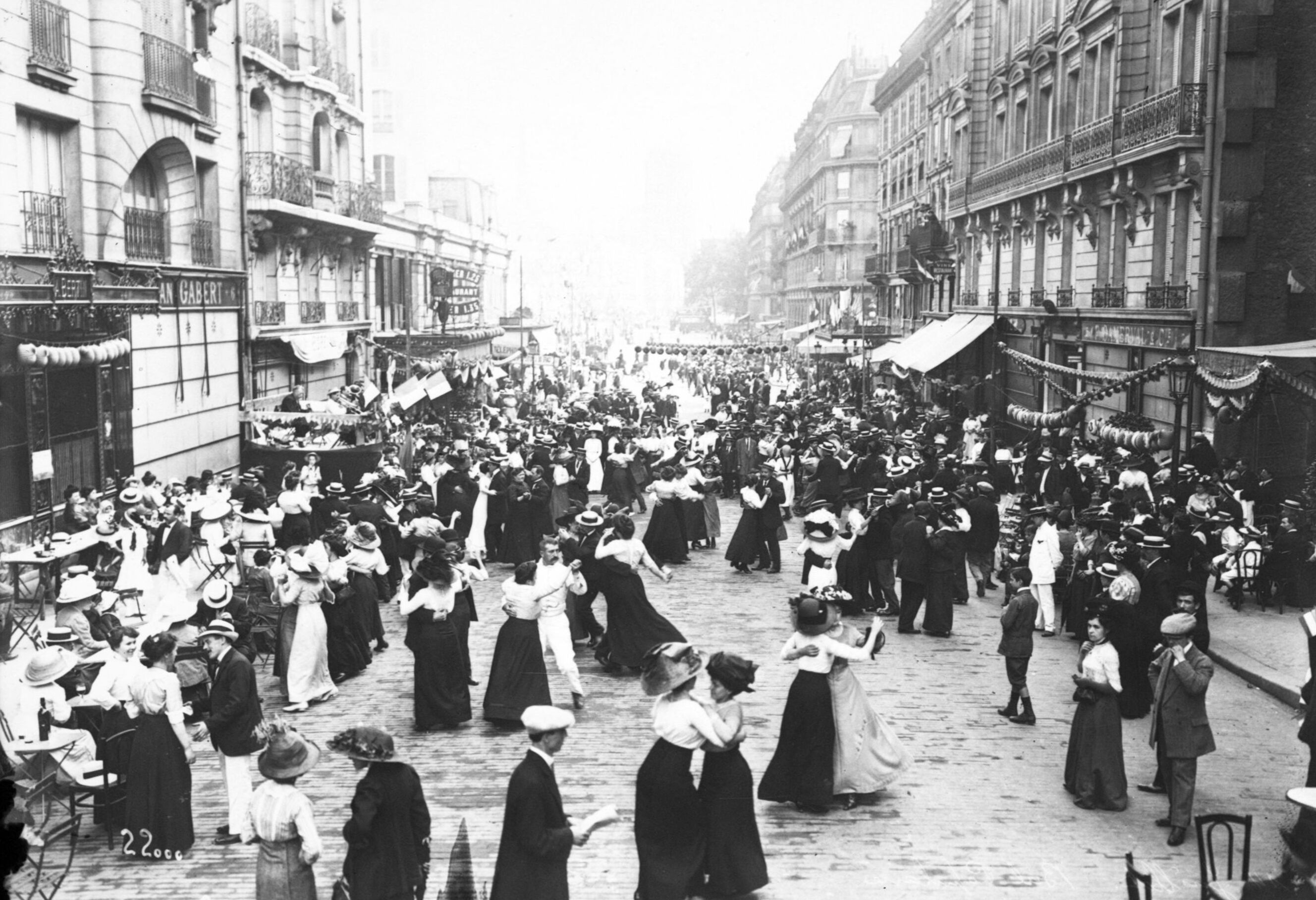
Paris, 1912

Cut off from public money, Bardina ensured private support. In 1911 the Dural couple, owners of a well-to-do trading company, agreed to finance a new school. It materialized as Institución Spencer; Bardina, apart from having been a headmaster, taught math, geography, languages and history. The enterprise was largely a private Durall tuition affair, as the only alumni known were their numerous children and Bardina's own oldest daughter. For financial reasons or reasons which are not clear, the school closed after just one year, in 1912.

Bardina found himself in financial dire straits, especially that creditors of Escola de Mestres threatened him with legal action. With life in Barcelona becoming unbearable, he pondered upon starting an entirely new life elsewhere. In 1912 with some of his former alumni he moved to Paris to learn the French educational system, the stay financed initially with private money; having obtained public grant, he then extended the mission to Belgium and Britain. He viewed it already as a way to leave Spain forever, but at this stage things did not work out that way. He had to return to Barcelona; in 1914 the newly formed Mancomunitat launched a number of new educational establishments, but Bardina was not invited to take part in any. He resumed collaboration with La Veu de Catalunya; under a pen-name "Capitán de Estado Mayor", in 1914-1917 he contributed fairly popular chronicles of military developments of the Great War. In the 1910s he published also a few self-devised and hugely successful manuals on hygiene, medicine, self-defense, savoir-vivre and home cuisine.

In the mid-1910s Bardina's idea of leaving Spain focused on Colombia, where some of his alumni settled. However, in 1916 it was the government of Bolivia which sought assistance in Madrid to fill the post of philosophy and letters director at Instituto Normal Superior in La Paz. As initial recruitment process, staged by Ministry of Education, proved fruitless, advised by a Bolivian consul in Barcelona Bardina applied for the job. It is not clear whether his PhD dissertation, accepted in early 1917, was anyhow related to the recruitment process; one month later he signed a contract with the Bolivian government. In May 1917 Bardina already assumed his duties in La Paz, having found Instituto as a miserable institution adhering to medieval educational standards. He immediately attempted to implant his unorthodox methods, which instantly produced acute conflict with local staff. After 45 days in charge, Bardina resigned.

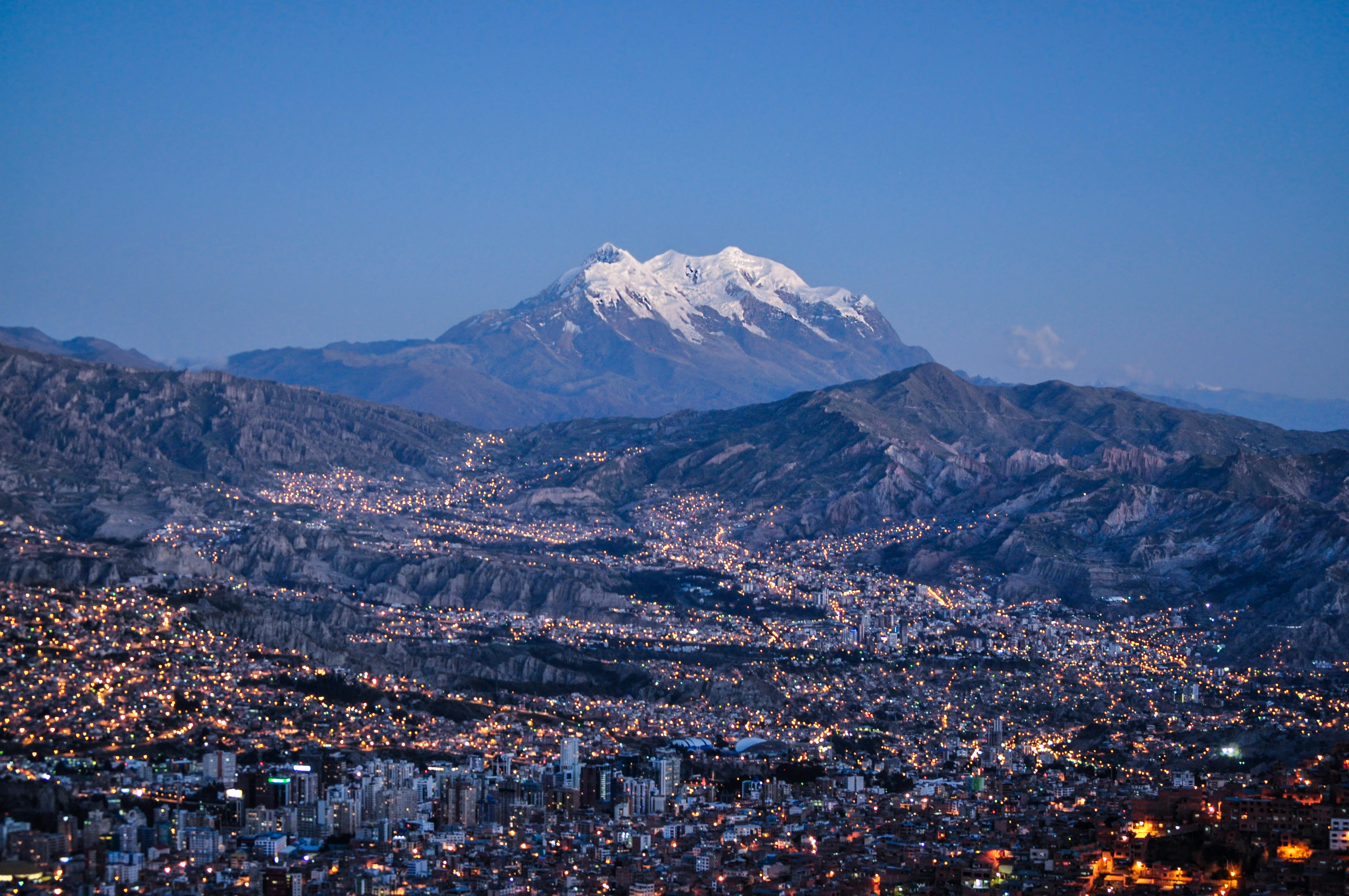
La Paz (present-day view)

In La Paz Bardina befriended Rafael Edward Salas, head of military ordinariate of the Chilean armed forces. Acting on his advice, Bardina accompanied Salas on his return trip to Santiago de Chile and settled in the city. He took up assignment at a local religious school and commenced collaboration with a Catholic Valparaíso periodical, La Unión; it is also in Santiago where he remarried. Shortly afterwards La Unión managers offered Bardina a job in Valparaíso, the proposal he accepted. In 1921 he moved to the coastal city, where he would remain until the end of his life.

== Pundit ==
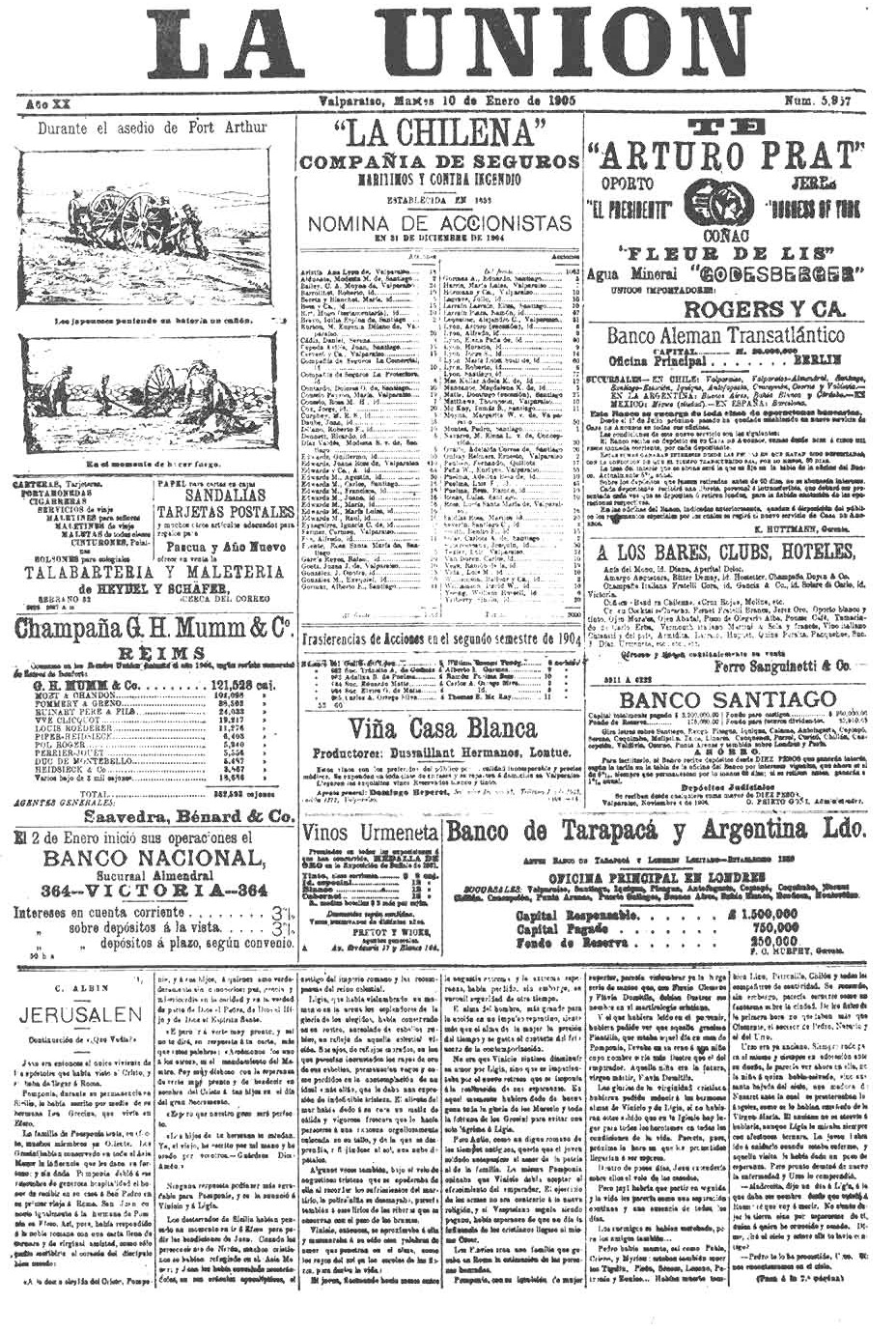
La Unión

In Valparaíso Bardina commenced teaching at Seminario San Rafael, a very prestigious establishment set up by the local archbishop and aimed at modelling not only future priests, but also as a stepping stone towards a lay career. He started contributing to Boy, a periodical issued by the college and in 1925 renamed to Lux. In the 1920s he published numerous pieces, centered on education though at times dealing also with social and political issues; set in the Catholic framework, they nevertheless kept advancing innovative views on schooling. He also dedicated himself to family life, enjoying birth and education of his four children. At unspecified time in the 1920s he commenced teaching at a customs officer training center, which proved to be a safe source of income and provided him with esteem of the civil servant.

In the early 1920s Bardina and his local collaborator Joaquín Blaya launched Annuario Internacional Americano, a business magazine focused on commerce. The project proved hugely successful, with the review distributed in many American countries; it also consumed much of his time, as gathering information and establishing new links Bardina started to travel across the continent; his trips took him to Peru, Colombia, Venezuela, Argentina and Ecuador. For the first time he enjoyed affluence, travelling extensively, staying in the best hotels and basking in the growing prestige. As he maintained contacts with his former Barcelona editors, he kept re-issuing manuals written back in Spain; posing as an expert and hailed by friendly periodicals as “celebre Dr. Saimbraum”, one of the pen-names he assumed, Bardina used to recommend booklets of “Dra. Fanny”, another nom de plume of him.

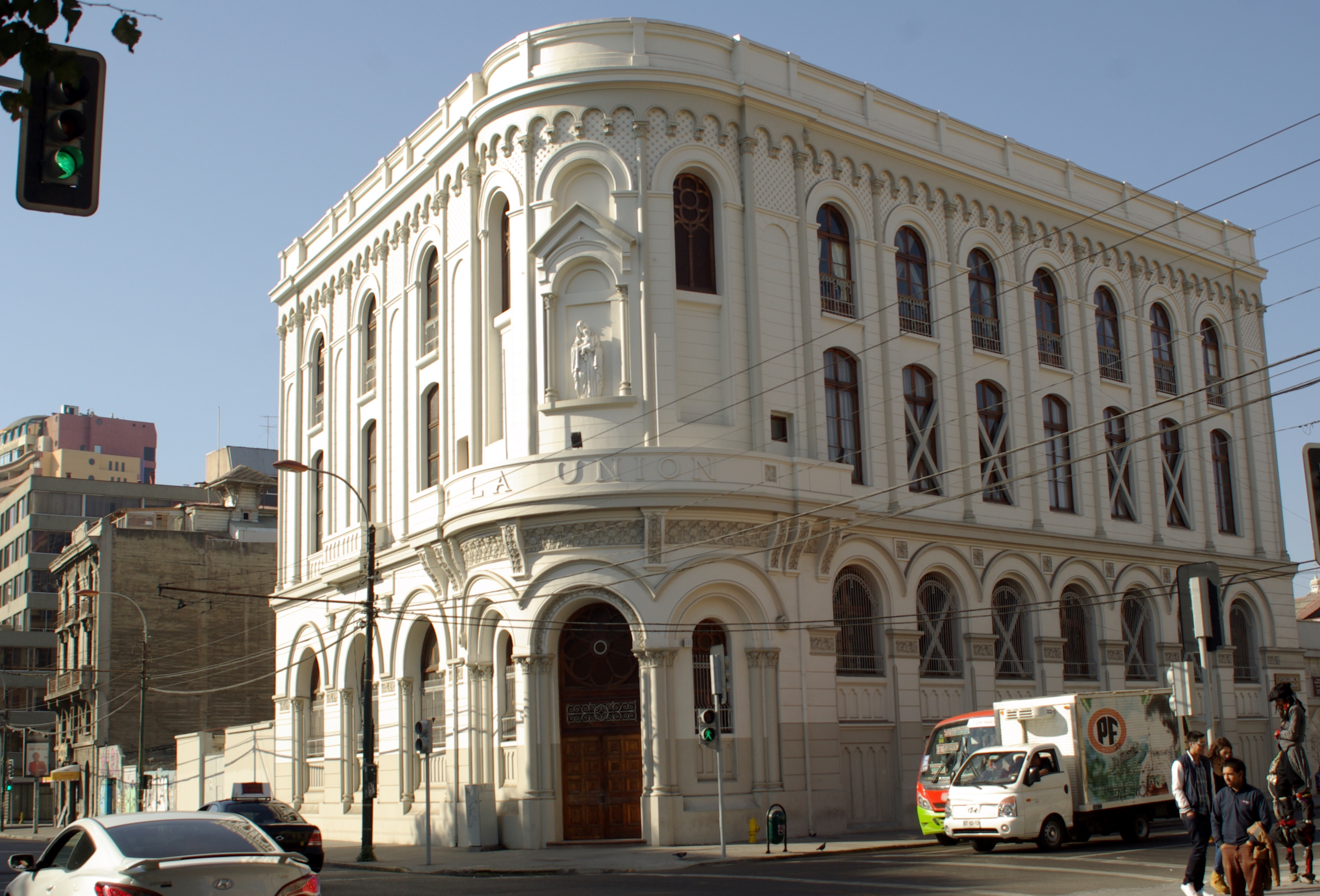
Valparaíso, former La Unión office

Apart from contributing to periodicals issued by Seminario San Rafael, Bardina kept supplying other newspapers and reviews, like Diario Hispano-Americano of Valparaíso or Diario Ilustrado of Santiago de Chile; some, however, refused to publish his pieces due to “exceso de originalidad”. His key partner remained La Unión, the assignment which originally brought him to Valparaíso; in fact, his contributions assumed massive scale. Bardina's flagship product was La Semana Internacional, a weekly Monday column discussing international politics which kept appearing until the early 1930s. His pieces fell chiefly into three fields: education, international politics and internal social and political issues, the last one covered mostly from the Catholic social perspective. It was his contributions to La Unión which over time earned Bardina the status of a pundit and high position in the Valparaíso societé. However, co-operation with the daily ended abruptly. In 1932 Bardina sided with the striking staff against the La Unión management; as a result he had to leave the newspaper.

== Scholar ==
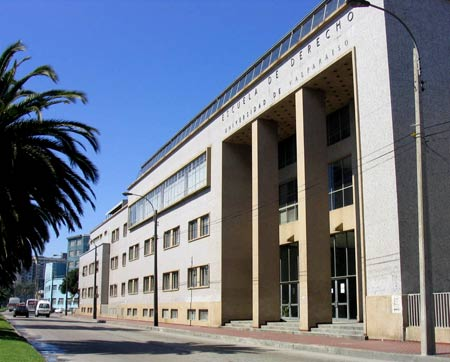
Escuela de Derecho (current view)

In 1928 Bardina was appointed professor of labor law at Escuela de Derecho, a newly established Valparaíso outlet of Universidad de Chile. Since he had neither juridical education nor juridical practice, circumstances of his nomination are not clear. The academic post gradually became his principal activity. He retained jefatura of Cátedra del Derecho de Trabajo throughout the 1930s and most of the 1940s, putting into practice his concepts of education. Bardina remained very distinct from other professors; he is remembered by his former disciples as attentive, encouraging, partner-like and sort of an “iconoclast”. Instead of lecturing the audience, he preferred – much in line with his educational outlook, though also perhaps not unrelated to his lack of juridical background – to engage in discussion. Periodically he was entrusted also with other academic assignments, e.g. temporarily holding Cátedra de Sociología y Economía Social.

In 1932 Bardina set up another weekly on his own, La Semana Internacional. The periodical, very much a one-man show, kept appearing for some 15 years and was distributed in America and in Europe. It turned into his personal tribune; apart from review of international politics, it covered a vast array of other topics, earning him position also abroad. Le Semana demonstrated Bardina's increasingly democratic penchant combined with concern about social issues and poverty. Initially sympathetic towards the Spanish Republic, he later started to view it as incapable of solving structural issues; following a period of hesitation, during the Civil War he tended to side with the Nationalists. Posing as an impartial observer, he welcomed Falange's program and Franco’s social legislation, considered “más acentuadamente social que la legislación obrera de la República”, yet he criticized Francoism for crackdown on Catalan and Basque culture. Bardina's sympathy for Nazism developed along the same lines; he considered Hitler a champion of genuine democracy, the voice of the people, against façade democracy and capital-driven imperialism of Britain, France and their sidekicks like Poland. Politically he neared Movimiento Nacional-Socialista de Chile of Jorge González von Marées.

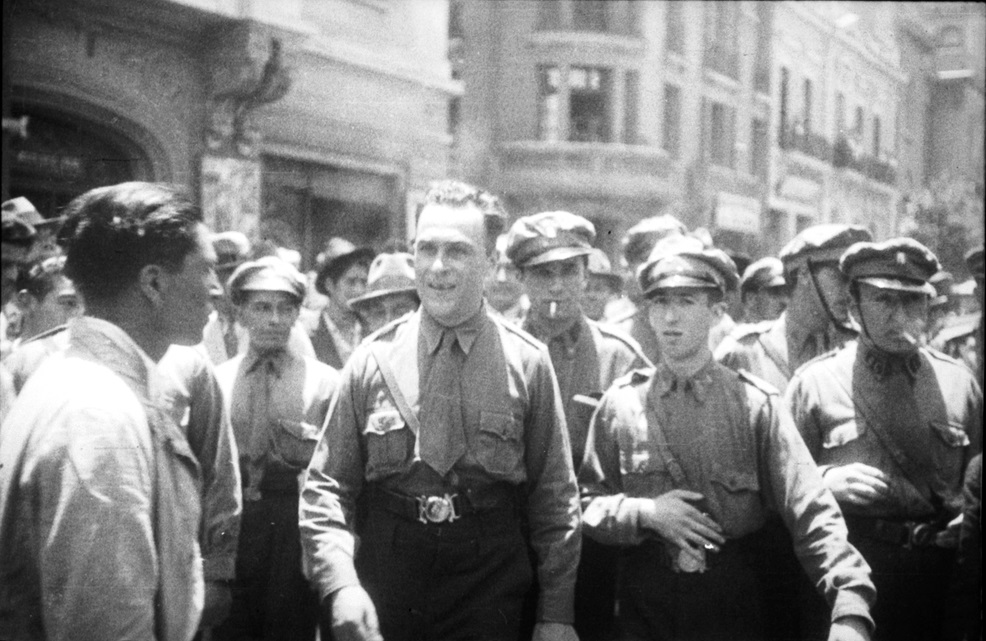
Chilean fascists, 1940s

The 1930s are perhaps the period of Bardina's professional and social climax. Holding a prestigious academic post, he enjoyed friendship with some highly positioned Chilean dignitaries, including the president of Chile, Carlos Ibañez del Campo; young people were turning to him when seeking jobs. He was offered newspaper management posts back in Spain, awarded prestigious medals and other international honors. The period of prospect lasted until the mid-1940s, when fortune abandoned Bardina again. Due to its pro-Nazi sympathies, La Semana was blacklisted by the US authorities, which caused problems in print and in distribution; the weekly went into decline. His manuals, reprinted for years in Spain, were already 20 years old and dried out as a source of royalties. Though in 1945 Bardina was still noted as an energetic, elderly gentleman, his health soon deteriorated rapidly and he had to abandon the academic post. As a result, his last years were plagued by financial problems.

== Thought ==
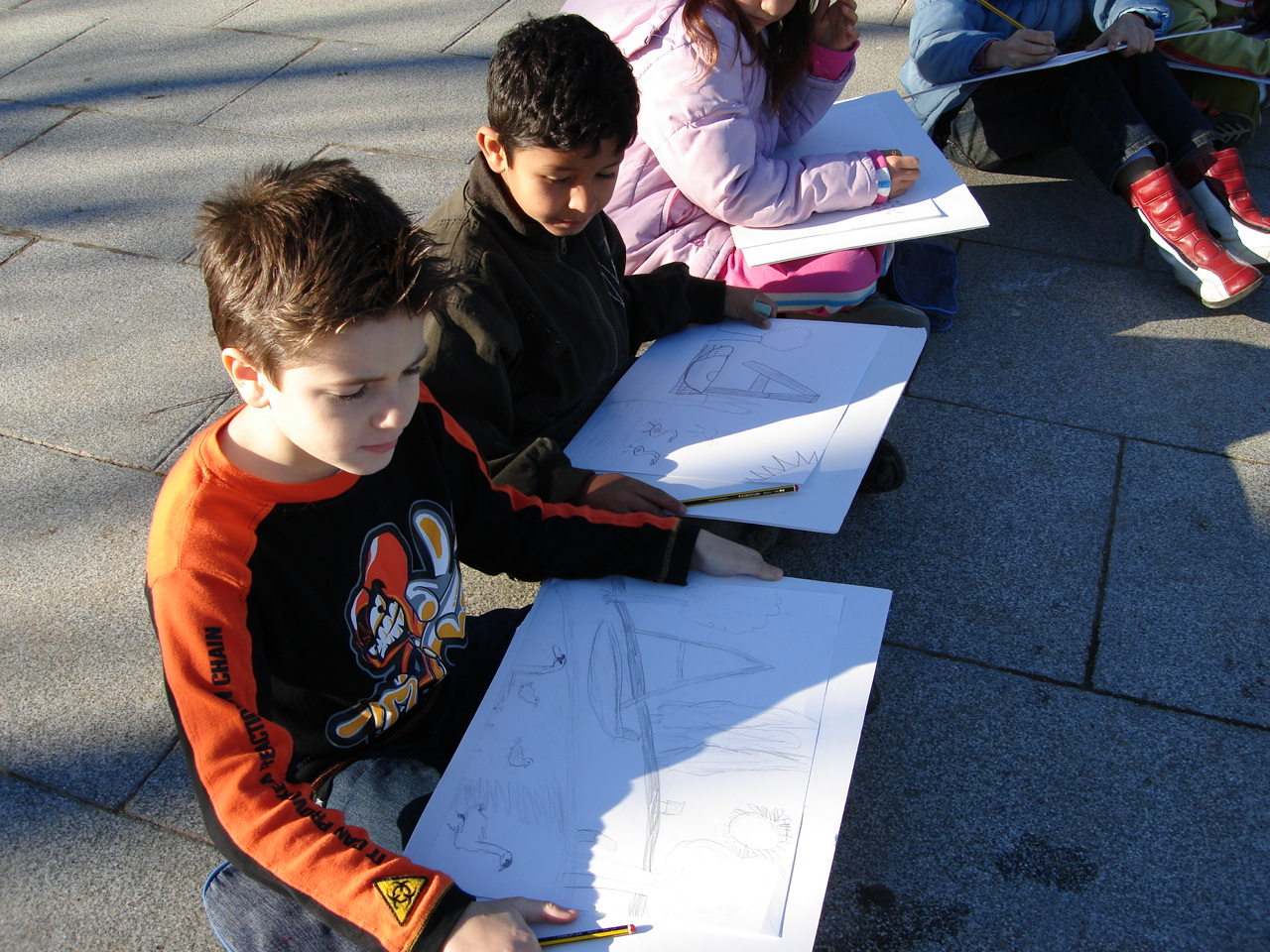
Primary education, Catalonia

Bardina's views on education are reconstructed predominantly on basis of his theoretical works. His opus consists mostly of articles, scattered across numerous periodicals issued in Spain or in Chile. His manuals, published anonymously and few of them covering education-related topics, attracted far less attention. How Bardina put his ideas into practice remains rather obscure; the 1906-1910 period at Escola de Mestres is analyzed in detail, but there is no study of his term in the Santiago seminary in the late 1910, in the Valparaíso college in the 1920s, in Escuela de Derecho in the 1930s and 1940s or in fiscal and customs training schools in Chile.

It is not completely clear how Bardina developed his interest in education and what his inspiration was. His ideas on the long term relationship between forming teachers and its socio-economic consequences are only reflected on his work. Some scholars assume that his first observations were a negative one, namely own 9-year period in the seminary. Having learnt the basics during university studies, he kept reading; personally he neared the Gines de los Rios brothers. Later on he admitted influence of Torres, Rey, Bolívar, Ortega, Bartolomé, father Manjón, Ribera and Altamira, which adds up to an amalgamate of innovators encompassing Escuelas del Ave María, technocrats, Liberals and heterodox from Institución Libre.

Bardina rejected what he perceived as antiquated education system and strove to build a new one. Its objective was not to pass on knowledge, but to prepare for life within a system. The means was to reinvigorate and channel natural potential of students; this in turn was to be achieved by focus on effort instead of result, on searching instead of absorbing, on satisfaction instead of awards/penalties and on co-operation instead of competition. The role of teachers was an apostolic one; to inspire and lead by example rather than to enforce and execute. School was to be a natural setting – hence the stress on Catalan as native tongue, excursions, hygiene, physical exercises, experiments and interfacing with the non-scholarly realm in general; mixed-sex education and a social mix were considered components of this natural realm. Catholic moral formation was an indispensable part of the curriculum; it was formatted in functional rather than transcendent terms with stress on freedom of choice rather than obedience.

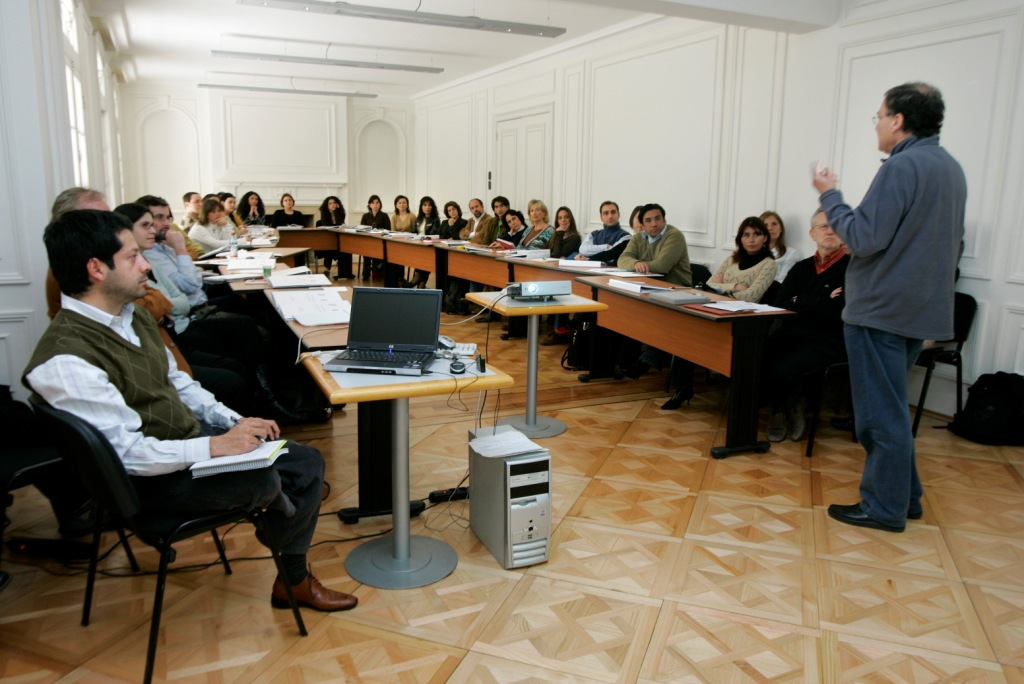
Academic education, Chile

Though Bardina remained highly sympathetic towards ILE, his vision differed by stress on Christian values and role of the family. Also the Montessori school was charged with excessive “institucionalismo”, apart from issues related to mixing ages and inward-leaning perspective. Padre Manjón was suspected of excessive stress on rules and the followers of Spencer were criticized for chaotic “robinsonismo” in education; a libertarian pedagogue Alexis Sluys found himself under particularly heavy fire for archaic concept, a clash perhaps related to Bardina's episode in Bolivia. Currently Bardina is counted among scholars forming l’Escola Nova, a common term applied retroactively to a number of Catalan educators who commenced activity in the late 19th century and consolidated in the 1920s. According to some, he was its “activista e impulsor”, and l’Escola de Mestres “provided an extraordinary momentum which from the onset directed all pedagogical renewal in Catalonia”.

== Reception and legacy ==
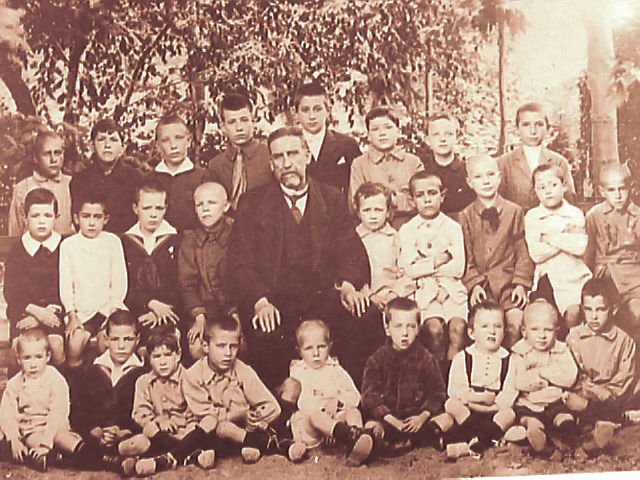
Catalonia, 1920s

During the period of 1904-1909 Bardina seemed a rising star of the Catalan education system; afterwards he remained sidetracked, to disappear entirely in 1917. Some scholars claim that schooling initiatives of Mancomunitat, launched in the 1910s and 1920s, were influenced by the Bardinian vision, though they note also that he was merely one of many contributors to the ongoing change in education. The most visible sign of Bardina's presence in Spain in the 1920s and 1930s were countless editions of his anonymous manuals. In the local Valparaíso realm he gained recognition as a press pundit; his academic role earned Bardina appreciation among the disciples, though he is not noted as an influential figure among Chilean scholars of law. It is rather his commentaries on international politics, especially on the American continent, which were acknowledged in Chile and some other Latin American countries. In 1944 he first earned a biography in Diccionario Biográfico de Chile, to be dropped in subsequent editions published after his death.

Upon the news of Bardina's demise, in 1951 his former disciples and alumni organized a homage in his native Sant Boi. Soon afterwards three of them started to collect data for his brief biography, which was published in 1959; in 1961 one of them issued a 20-page booklet, apart from biographical info attempting also a summary of his pedagogical thought. In 1966 a new schooling establishment in Sant Boi was named Grup Escolar Joan Bardina; renamed to Col·legi Joan Bardina, it keeps operating until today. Bardina was elevated to the status of a revolutionary Catalan educational thinker in 1980, entered into the public discourse and earned a number of later publications, the key of them a PhD thesis published in 1996. In Chile he attracted scholarly attention in the 1990s, focused on as a great figure of "educación chilena" and noted also in other Latin American countries. In 2008 Fundació Privada Joan Bardina was set up.

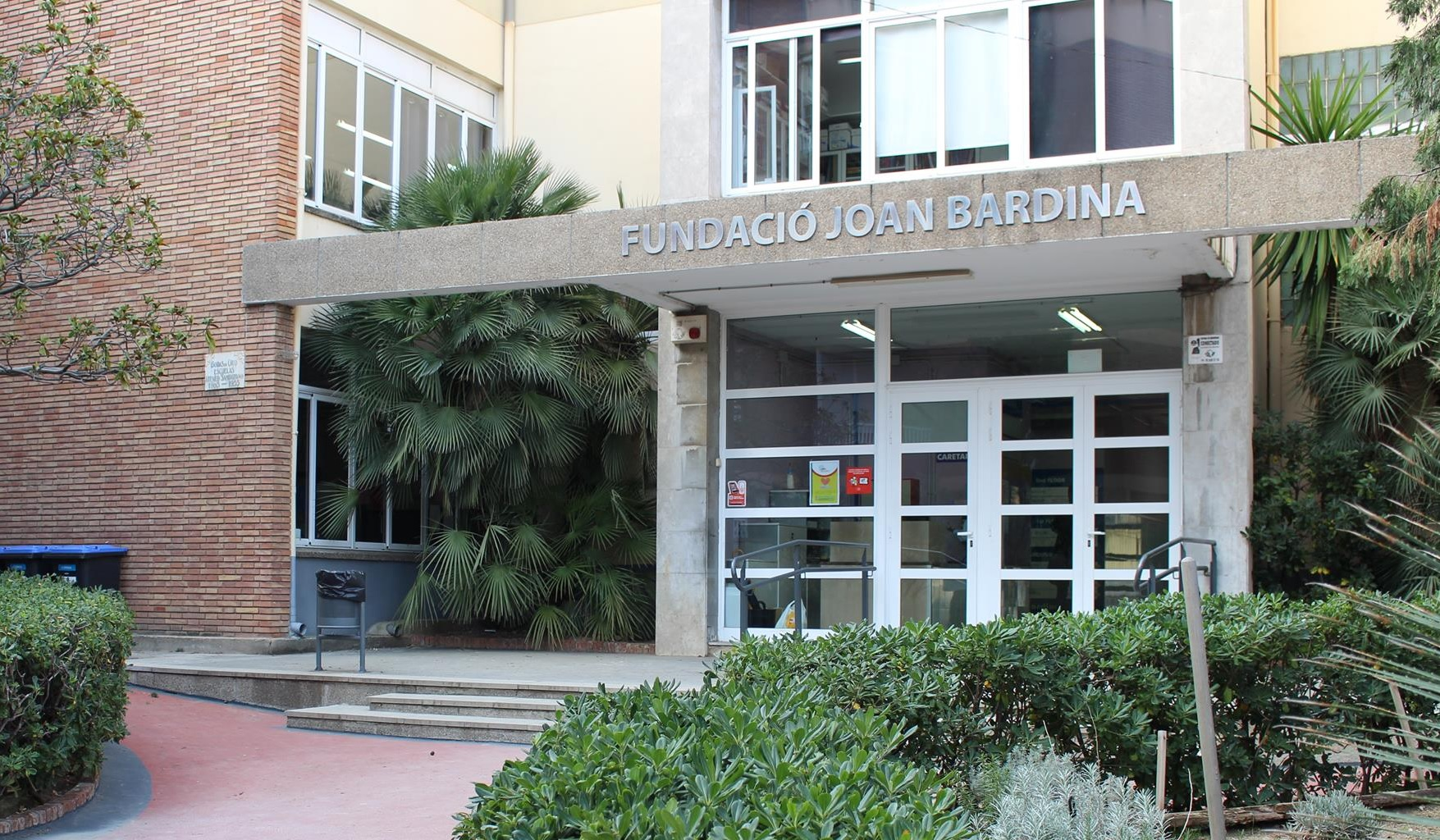
Joan Bardina Foundation headquarters, Barcelona

Currently Bardina is recognized in Catalonia and in Chile as an innovative theorist of education; though his direct influence was limited to own disciples, be it those of Escola de Mestres or Escuela de Derecho, he is credited for contributing to a new school of pedagogy. A few streets in Catalonia, including the one where he was born, are named after him. Centre d’Estudis Joan Bardina, a 1984-founded Catalan think tank promoting “a third way” within democracy between socialism and capitalism, chose him as their icon. Within a decisively hagiographic ambience, Bardina's pro-Francoist and pro-Nazi views are generally ignored. In social history he is considered a typical case of transitional identity in-between Carlism and a peripheral nationalism. Numerous self-devised manuals he published are barely noted and await evaluation. So far it remains unclear whether Bardina's textbooks on topics ranging from infantry tactics to grammar, self-defense, hygiene, savoir-vire and home-made confectionery are charlatanry or rather useful contributions to popular education.

== See also ==
- Carlism
- Catalanism
- Centro de Estudios Joan Bardina
- Lo Mestre Titas (1897-1900)
