= Vallparadís Park =

Park in Barcelona, Spain

- Parc de Vallparadís
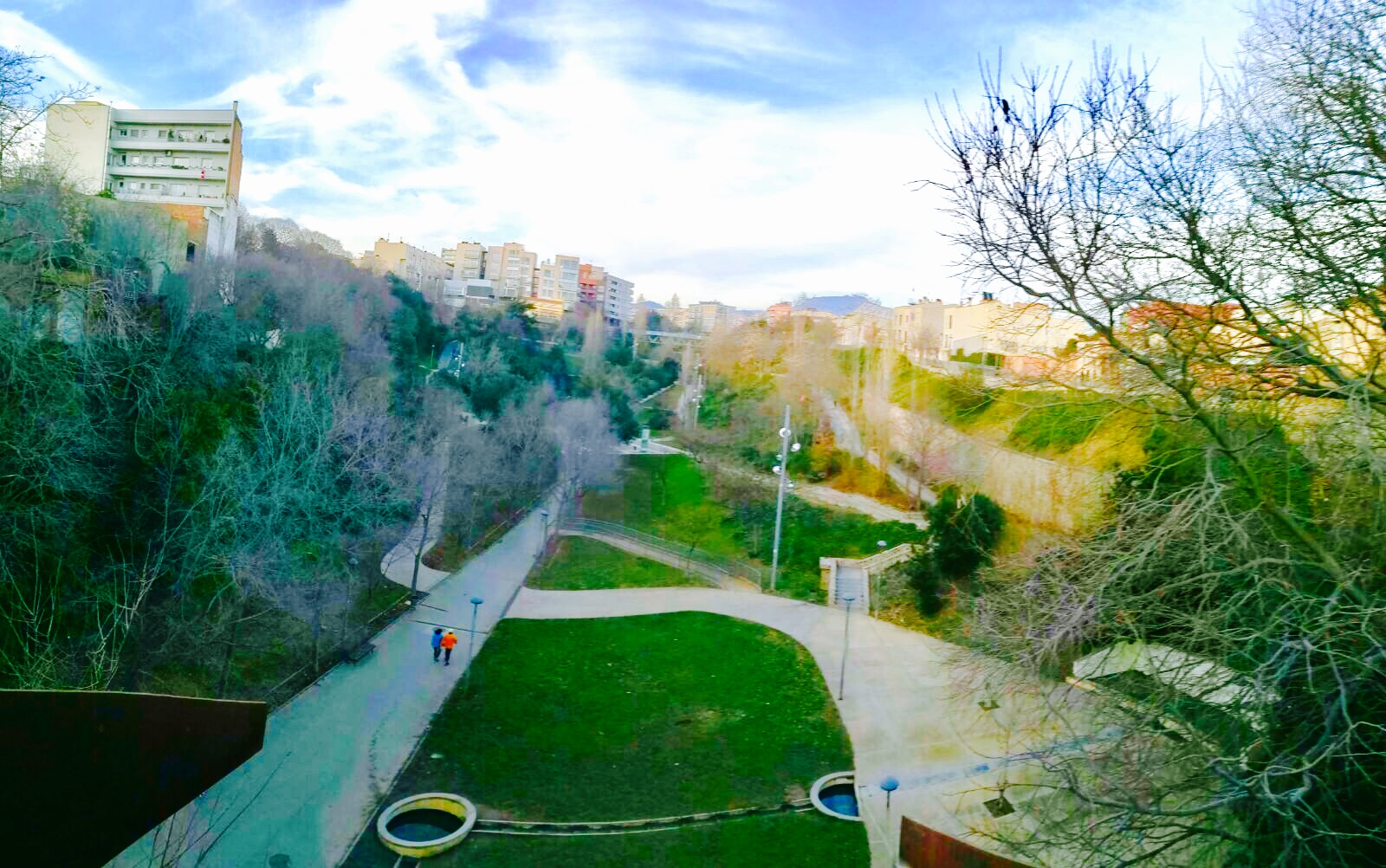
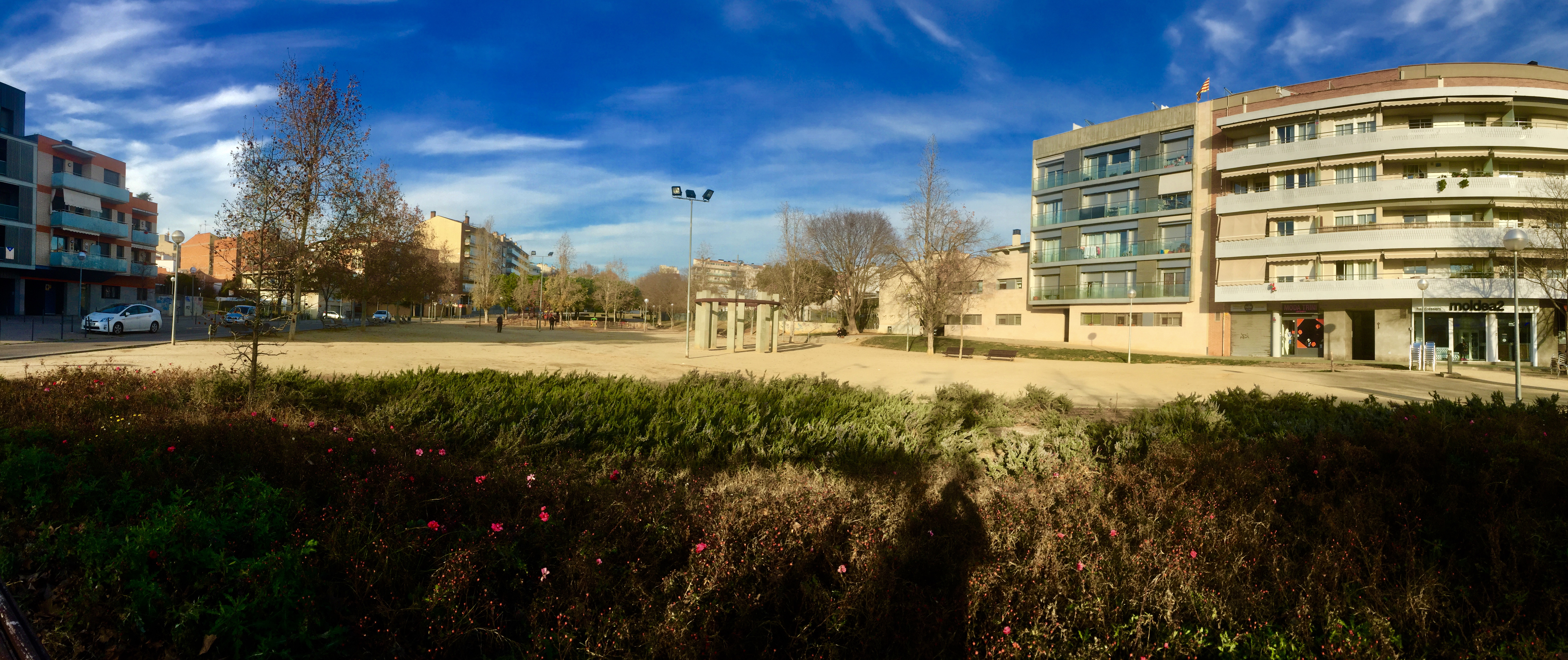
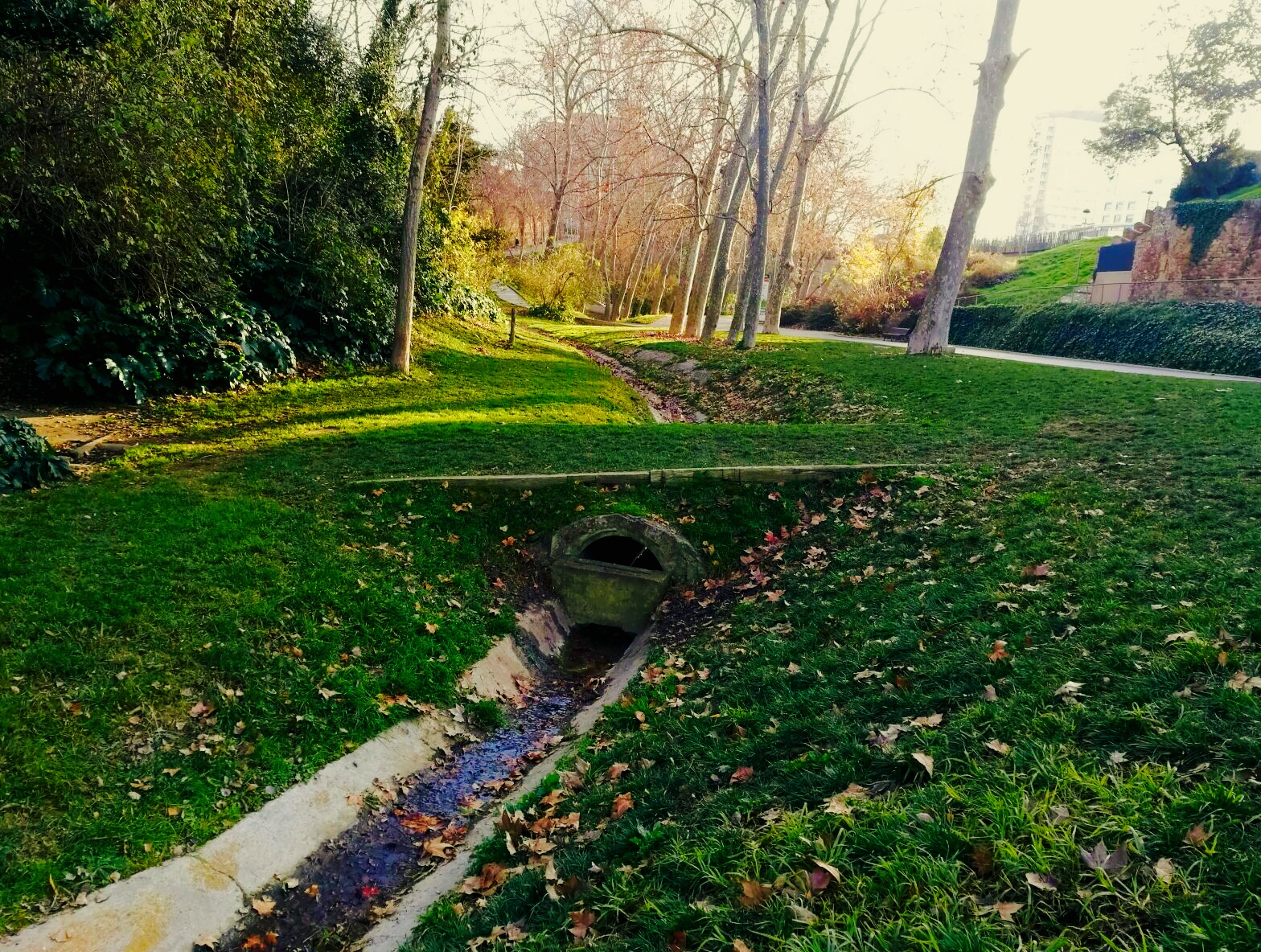
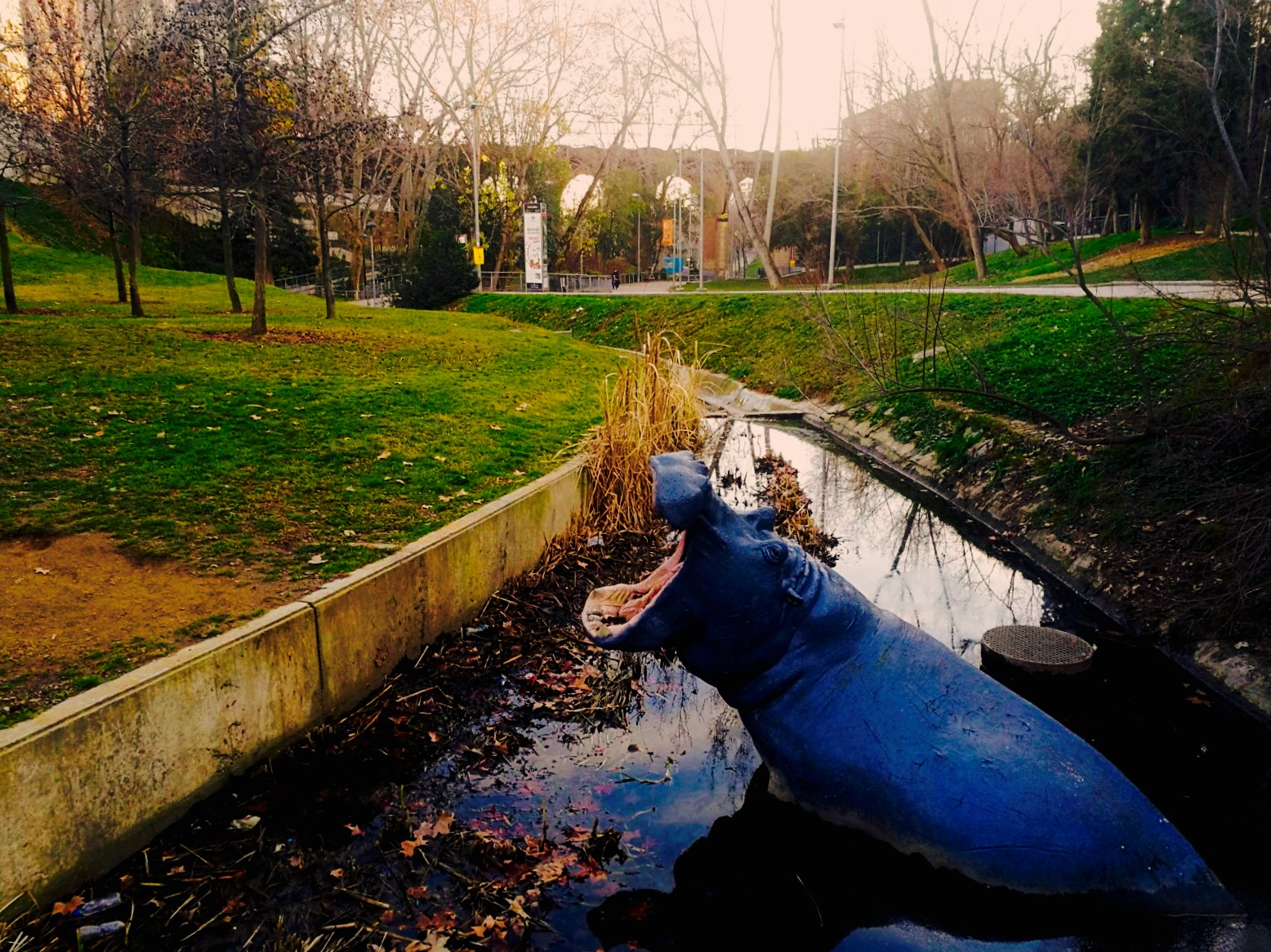
- From left to right and from top to bottom: panoramic illustration of the park; submerged canal in the center of the park; hippopotamus sculpture with Pont de Sant Pere in the background.

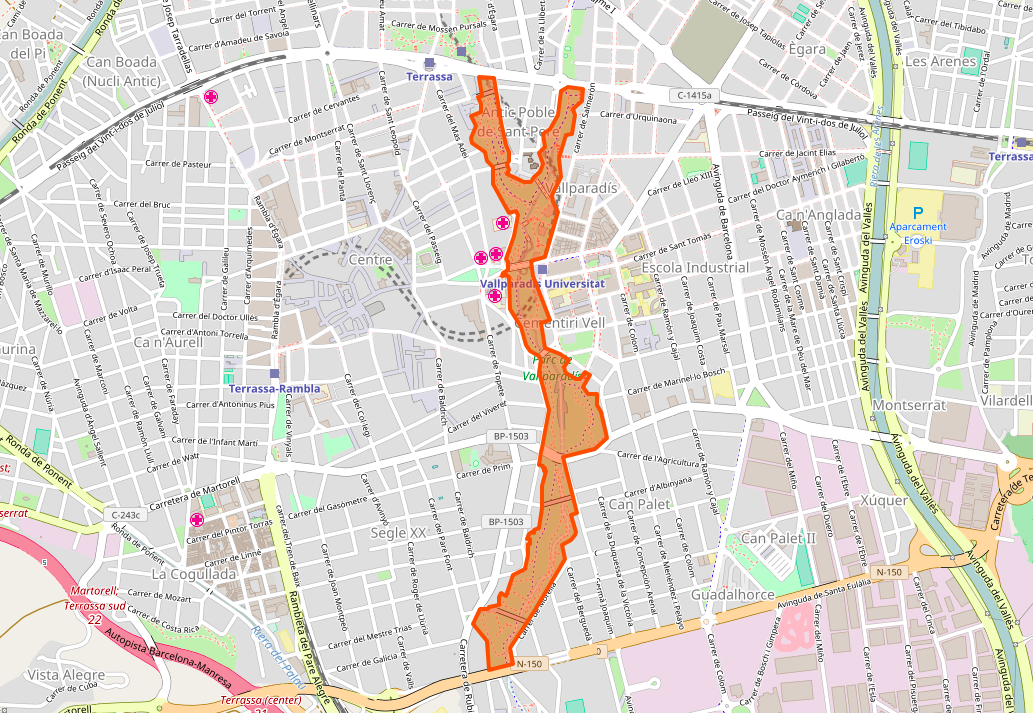
- Location of the park in Terrassa
- Type: Public Park
- Location: Catalonia
- Coordinates: 41.56°N 2.02°E
- Area: 39.5 ha (98 acres)
- Opened: 1991
- Operator: City Council of Terrassa
- Other information: Adjacent roads: 22 de Juliol walkway; Salmerón Street; Mas Adei Street; Sant Antoni Street; La Igualtat Street; Aurons Street; Mare de Déu del Pilar Street; Cementiri Vell Street; Miquel Servet Street; Vallparadís Street; Montcada Road; Pont del Gall

Vallparadís Park (in Catalan and officially Parc de Vallparadís) (Note: The translation would correspond to the term "Valley of Paradise", in reference to the first settlers who found the waters at the confluence of the torrents and fertile lands.) is a natural urban space located in the municipality of Terrassa, in the province of Barcelona, Spain. Its construction began in 1991, from several previous approaches during the 19th and 20th centuries, which culminated in the final drafting of the project by Manuel Ribas i Piera. The park was declared an Bien de Interés Cultural by the Government of Spain. From north to south it is about 3.5 km long, and averages about 100 m (330 ft) wide.

The first fossil findings in the area date back a million years; samples of Pleistocene flora and fauna have been discovered at the Cal Guardiola site, while the first evidence of human presence dates back to the Iberian period, found at the Egosa settlement. This site would eventually become Egara, now Terrassa.

The park has a "Y" shape due to the Vallparadís torrent and the Monner torrent, which converge in the Monumental church complex of Sant Pere de Terrassa, a historical heritage made up of a patrimonial, archaeological and artistic ensemble, a fundamental piece of Romanesque art in Catalonia. It houses the Textile Museum and Documentation Centre, one of the main textile museum institutions, consisting of a library, an image bank and a fabric collection, and the Carthusian castle of Vallparadís, a fortification —also declared a historical heritage site—dating from 1110, the main section of the current Terrassa Museum. In addition, the park has several architectural monuments of great importance such as the Casa Baumann, the Pont de Sant Pere or the Pont del Passeig.

Inside the park there are different facilities —such as a 180 m-long (590 ft) swimming pool or a large-scale train that runs through the center of the park— and events are held annually, such as the Jazz Picnic or the Festival of Colors, which attract thousands of spectators.

== History ==
=== Geology ===
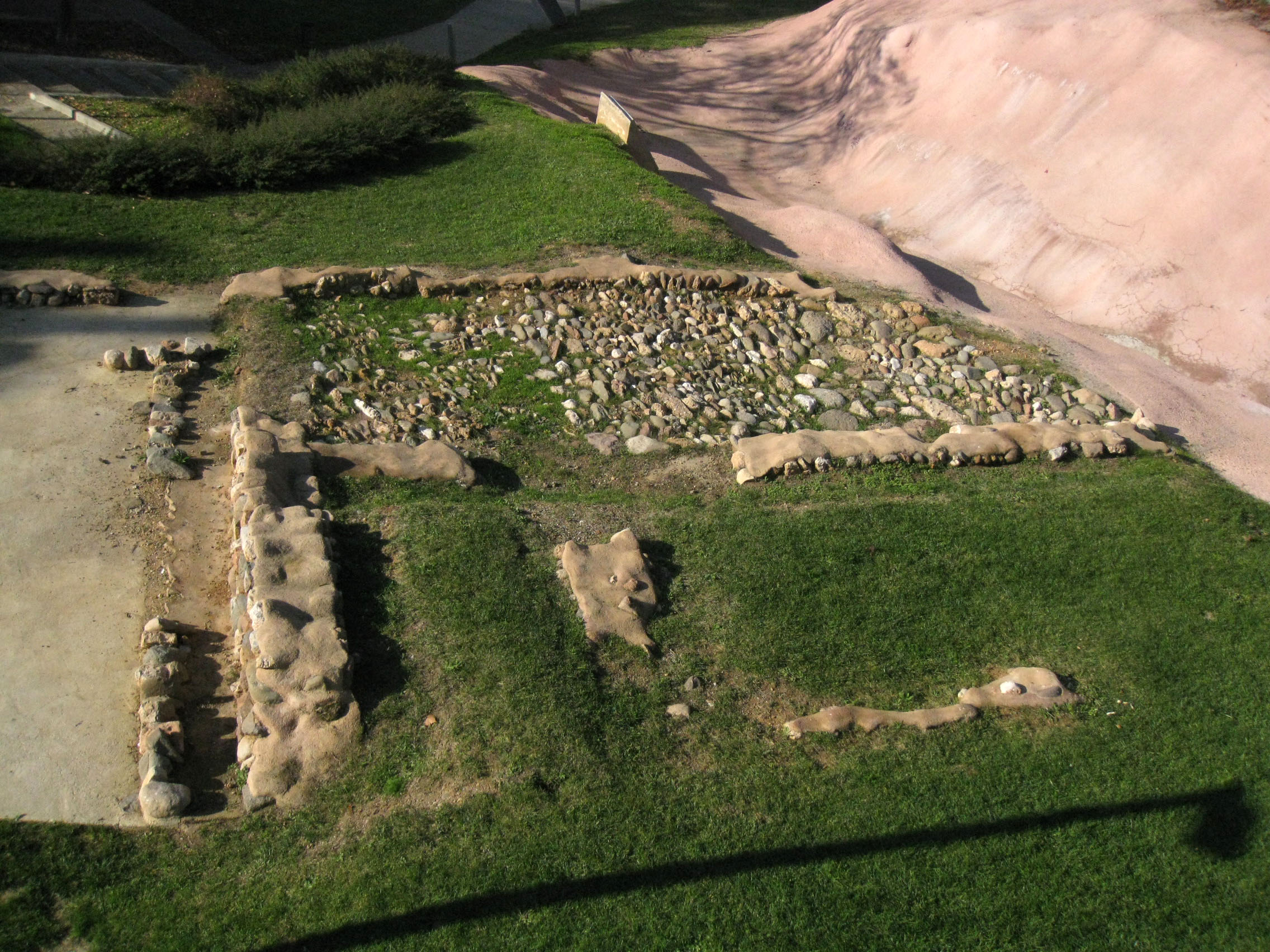
Archaeological remains near Vallparadís castle, in the same park.

Since the Neogene, the park has been naturally shaped by the fluvial erosion of the waters of the Monner and Vallparadís torrents, forming part of the Catalan pre-coastal depression.

The sediments found in the area correspond to the Neogene and later Quaternary, and come mainly from the erosion of metamorphic, volcanic and plutonic rocks from the Paleozoic, and also from terrigenous and carbonate rocks, both from the Mesozoic and Paleogene.

In 1997, through a series of archaeological excavations that lasted more than two years at the Cal Guardiola site, some 26,000 fossils were found, of which approximately 3,000 remains corresponded to mammals. Among them, the presence of hippopotamuses, damas, equus and hyenas are noteworthy. Other animal species found include various types of proboscideans, bears, rhinoceroses, jaguars, deer, macaques, megaloceroses, bovidae and a suidae, the only one found in Western Europe with an age of one million years.

Plant remains have also been found in the excavations, of which two large specimens with dimensions exceeding 3 m (9.8 ft) are worth mentioning.

=== Projection as a park ===
The Vallparadís park has gone through several stages until it became what it is today, since 1346, when the first settlers arrived in the area known as Vallis Paradisi. The torrents that occupied the park were inhabited by several agricultural settlements until the end of the 19th century, when the city of Terrassa was affected by the transformations of the municipality due to the arrival of the railroad in 1856 —in the northernmost part of the park— and the first urban planning project by Miquel Curet in 1878.

Thus, in 1895 the construction of the Pont del Passeig was adjudicated, considered the first modern structure in the park, and in 1915 the first urban planning project was carried out by Josep Maria Coll i Bacardí.

18 years later, in 1933, a second, more modest urban development plan called Pla Viñals was drawn up, but it was not until 1951 that the Plan General de Ordenación Urbana was drawn up by the Provincial Urban Planning Committee of Barcelona. Meanwhile, in 1942 a request was made for the Carthusian castle of Vallparadís to be declared a Historic-Artistic monument.

However, the Plan General de Ordenación underwent a series of modifications and it was not until 1965 that a new Plan was presented, revised in 1970, which incorporated special attention to green areas. Finally, in 1972, the park Nuevo Plan de Ordenación was approved with a detailed delimitation and management.

With the definitive Plan, in 1985 the drafting of the Plan Especial de Vallparadís was assigned to Manuel Ribas i Piera, a project that was executed between 1991 and 1997 in three construction phases.

In 1999, with the park already formed, a master plan was drawn up that set the autonomous organizational guidelines for Vallparadís.

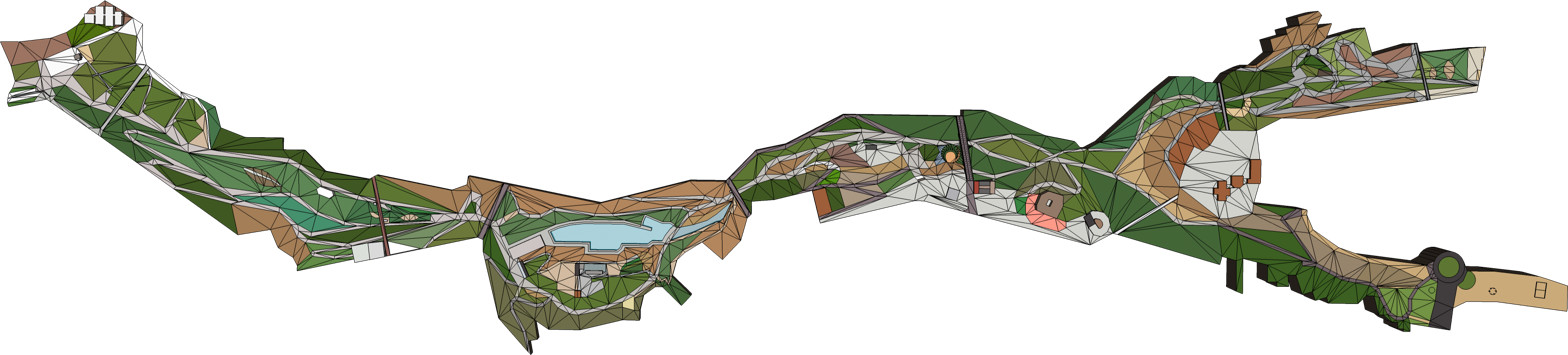
Panoramic illustration of the park in 3D from its northern end on the right —22 de Juliol Avenue— to the southern end on the left —Can Jofresa neighborhood—.

== Architecture ==
=== Monumental church complex of Sant Pere de Terrassa ===
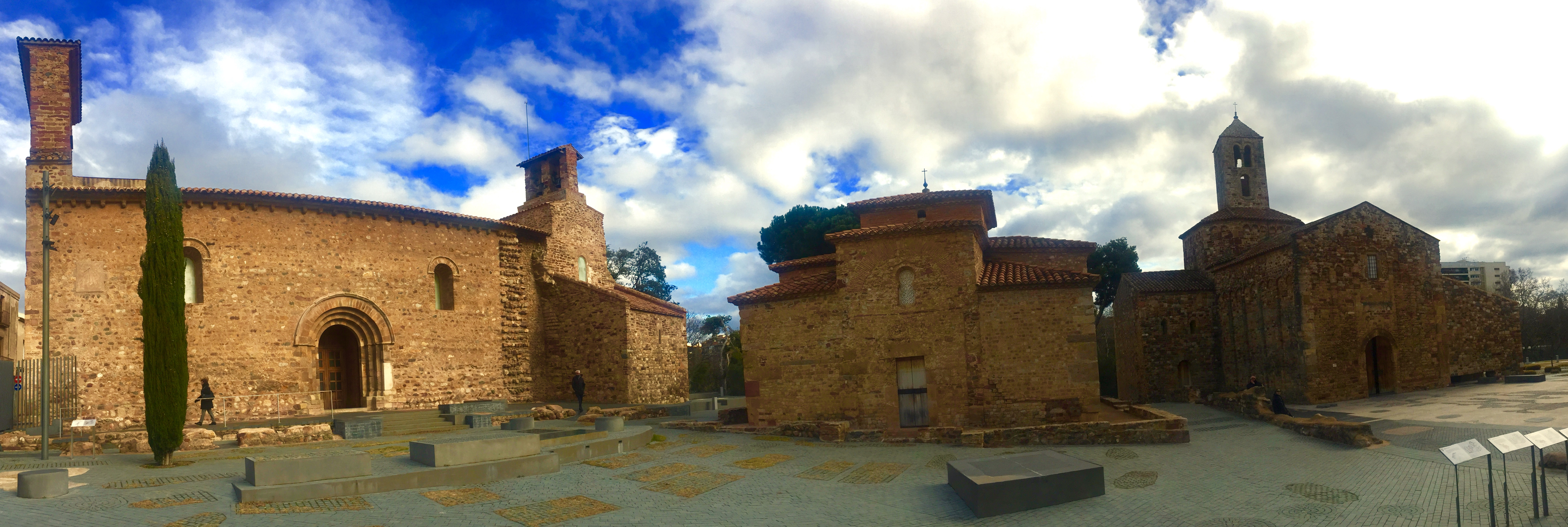
Panoramic view of the monumental complex of the churches of Sant Pere with the church of Sant Pere on the left, the church of Sant Miquel in the center and the church of Santa Maria on the right.

The churches of Sant Pere de Terrassa are a monumental complex formed by the Romanesque churches of Sant Pere, Sant Miquel and Santa Maria (Saint Peter, Saint Michael and Saint Mary), as well as the clergy house of Sant Pere and an archaeological site that were part of the nucleus of Égara. (Note: Egara was a municipality (Municipium Flavium Egara) in Roman Hispania that corresponds to the current city of Terrassa.)

It is a series of buildings with an existence of more than 1500 years that were restored in the late 19th century. Later, in 1906, an archaeological search was carried out on the site by the architect Josep Puig i Cadafalch. This exploration resulted in one of the most important elements for the historiographical evaluation of the diocese of Egara, documented from the year 400 to 750. The complex, which encompasses both the late and early medieval periods, was built on a small hill on both sides of the Vallparadís and Monner torrents that make up the park, at a time when Christianity went from being a tolerated religion to an official one. At first, a basilica was built, and later a cathedral, in the area currently occupied by the church of Santa Maria and the clergy house. In this construction, which lasted more than a century, a funerary shrine with a subway crypt was also built, which today is the church of Sant Miquel. In this area, tombs have been found facing east, (Note: According to classical Christian symbolism, the tombs were oriented towards the east.) belonging to the necropolis of the Episcopal period of the 11th century and the Carolingian period of the 9th and 10th centuries. During this period a parish church was also built, which corresponds to the church of Sant Pere and the episcopal palace next to the cathedral.

The whole ecclesiastical complex expanded progressively over the years until its peak, around the 11th and 12th centuries.

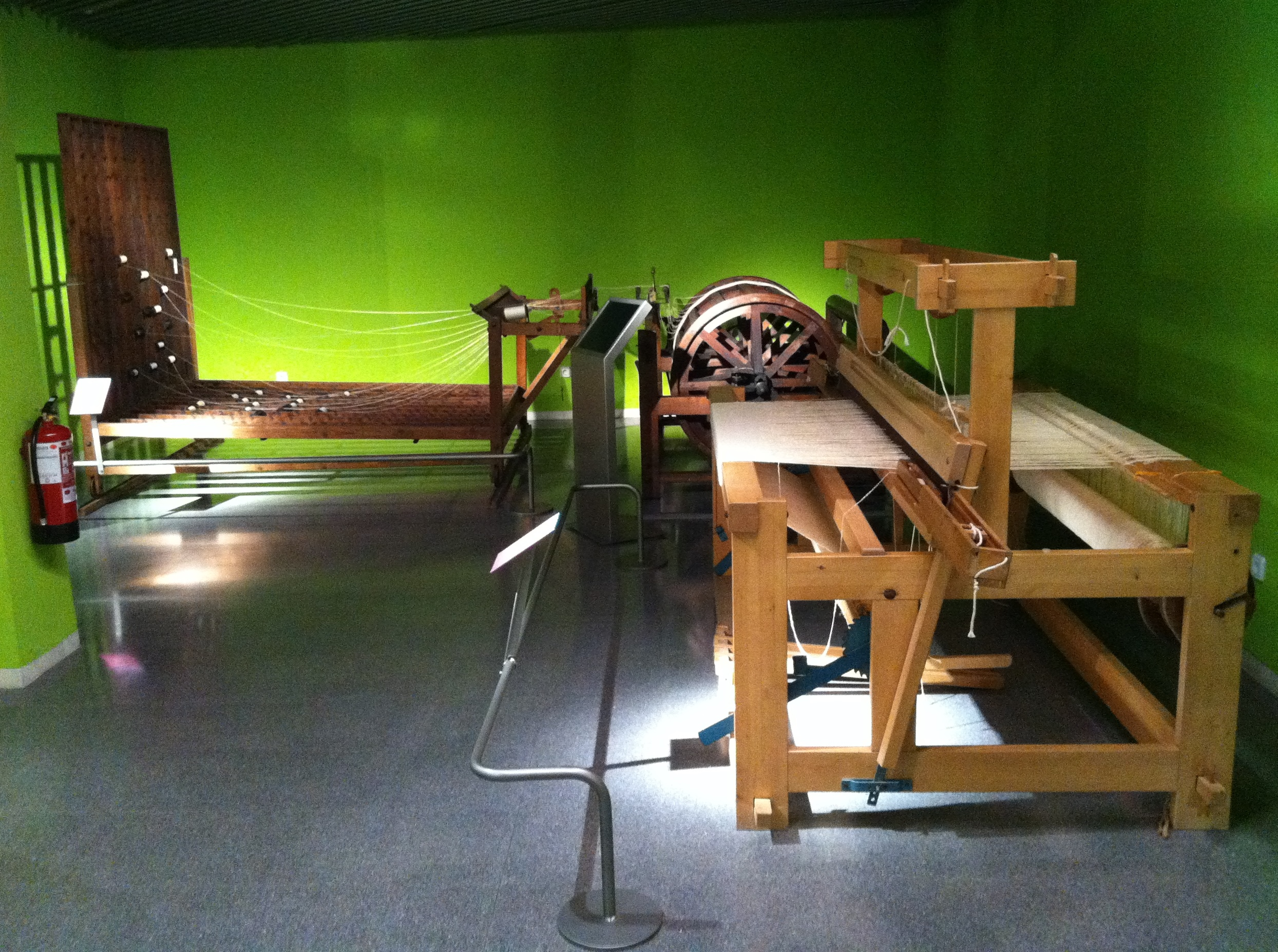
Machinery exhibition area on the first floor of the Textile Museum gallery.

=== Textile Museum and Documentation Centre ===
The Textile Museum and Documentation Centre is a museum institution located on the east side of the central part of the park, next to the Carthusian castle of Vallparadís. It is a gallery dedicated to the textile world, in which Terrassa played one of the most important roles of the Industrial Revolution in this sector.

The gallery, which presents an overview of the different techniques and styles used by the different regions throughout history, is managed by the City Council of Terrassa, together with the Provincial Diputation of Barcelona and is part of the Barcelona Provincial Council Local Museum Network. It has a collection of fabrics with 365 pieces that were incorporated into the museum between 1946 and 1968, antique dealers and brocade, as well as church sarcophagi.

At present, the textile gallery can be consulted upon request, and there is also a free consultation service of the museum's collection via Internet.

=== Carthusian castle of Vallparadís ===
The Carthusian castle of Vallparadís, located in the easternmost part of the park's center, was a fortification documented as early as 1110, when the land was purchased from the then Count of Barcelona, Ramón Berenguer III.

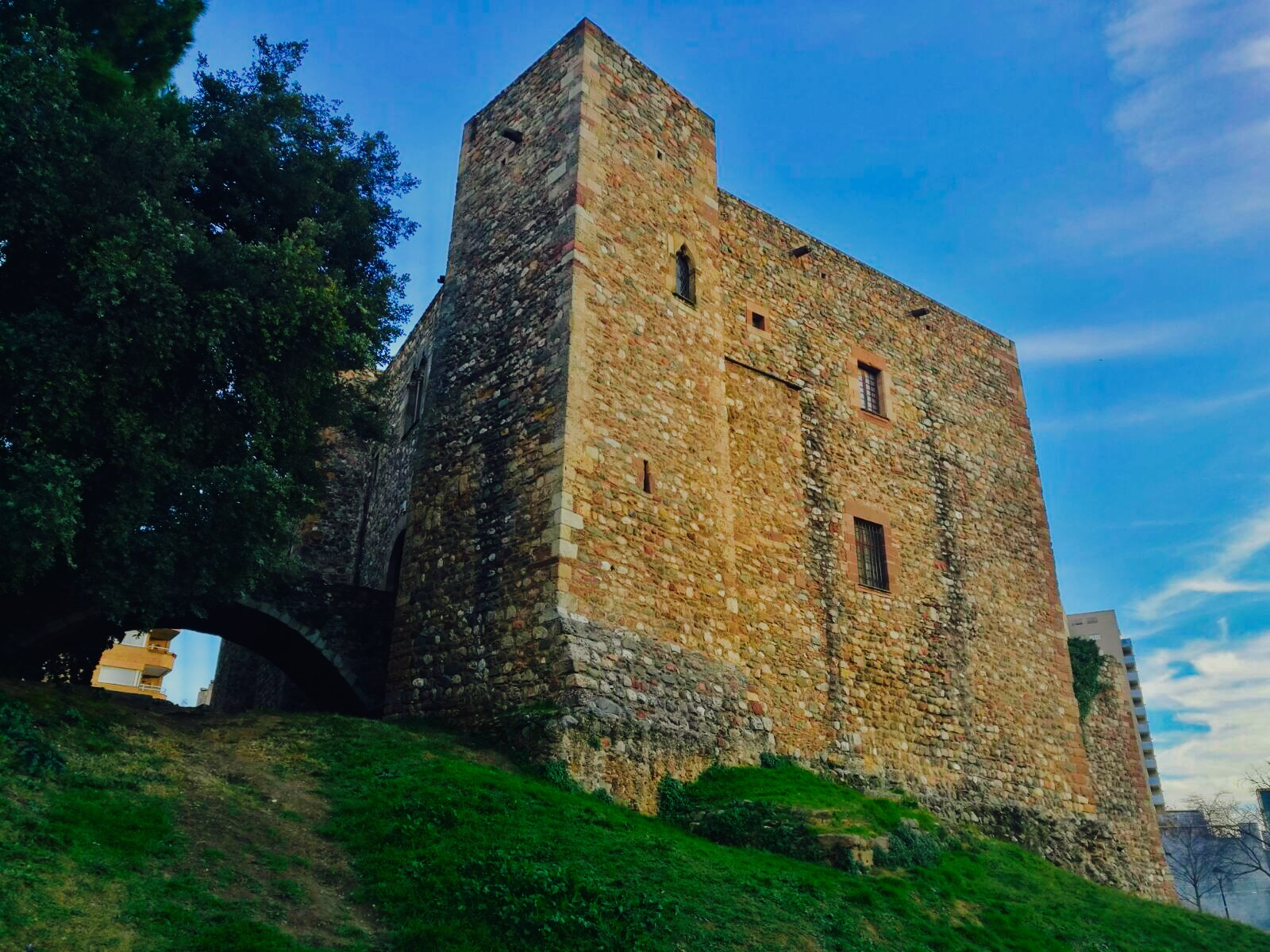
View of the Carthusian castle of Vallparadís from the center of the park.

The building rises on the edge of a large embankment of the park and has a rectangular plan, walls with arrowslits, towers at each of its corners and three bestorres on its west side. (Note: A bestorre is a semicircular or rectangular tower, very often open on one side, which is located in many of the enclosures with walls.) The reforms to transform it to the charterhouse functions still remain. It is worth mentioning a two-story cloister —the lower one with chaotic openings and the upper one more stable with pointed arches— and geometric capitals without decoration with the ancestral chapter house on the east side, covered with a rib vault. The old church of the monastery is what is known today as El Tinellet, with a flat roof supported by four diaphragmatic pointed arches.

Currently, the castle is the main section of the six that make up the museum complex of Terrassa and its exhibition is structured in different areas such as the natural environment, with the main habitats of the Vallés —forests, agricultural areas, streams and torrents—, prehistory and ancient world —with elements of the archeological sites of Egara, among others—, medieval world —with archaeological remains of the churches of Sant Pere, the castle of Vallparadís and the old castle-palace of Terrassa, among others—, modern era —with religious elements such as retables from the 17th and 18th centuries—, contemporary age —with rural and industrial life in the 19th century and culture and society —with a collection of paintings from the 20th century.

=== Casa Baumann ===
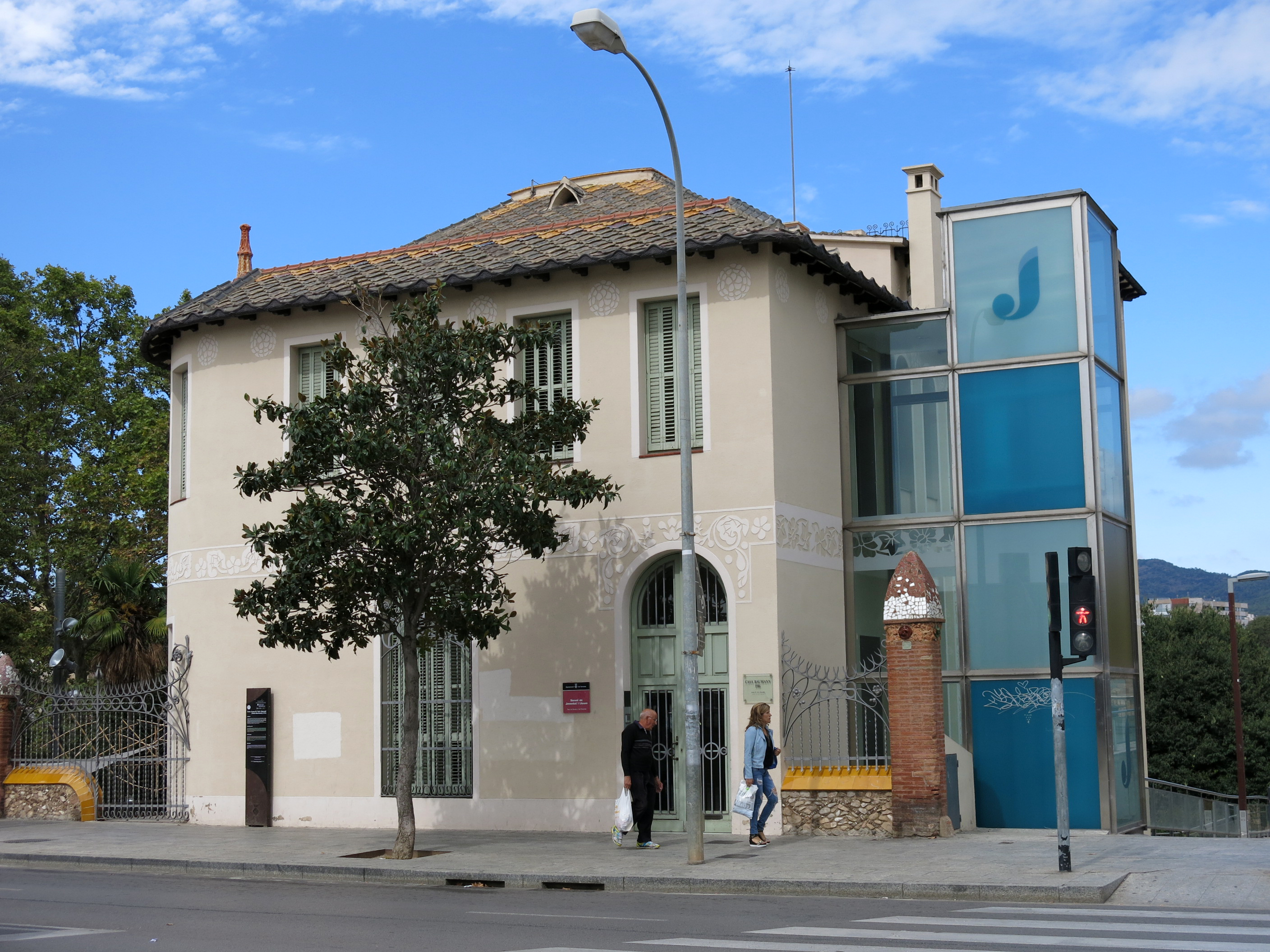
Front view of the Casa Baumann with the elevator added in 2007, to the right

Casa Baumann, also known as Casa Coll i Bacardí, is a 1913 building by the architect Josep Maria Coll i Bacardí. It was built with the purpose of serving as a home for the architect himself. It is located inside the park, south of the Vallparadís castle, on Jacquard Avenue, next to the Pont del Passeig. The building originally consisted of two levels and a large plot of land and was sold to the Ernest Baumann company. Subsequently, in 1982 the property was acquired by the City Council of Terrassa. Architecturally, the house underwent a first extension in 1926 and a second one, on the second floor, in 1951. Thirty-one years later, in 1982, the building was affected by a fire in the upper part and the city council had to consolidate the structure. In addition, in 1995, the building's exterior envelope was repaired. Finally, in 2007, the access points were adapted, part of the interior was modified and the current elevator, which can be seen today on the outside, was installed.

In 2003, the Casa Baumann was declared a Bien cultural de interés local with registration number 6706-I, and the building is currently used as the headquarters of the Youth and Children's Leisure Service of the City Council of Terrassa.

=== Retaining walls at Casa Salvans ===
The retaining walls of the Casa Salvans are the work of Lluís Muncunill i Parellada and are located on Salmerón Street, next to the park. They are walls formed with common rubble stone with a size that decreases the higher they are in the wall. They are formed by pebble stones that form an irregular line, which goes down a slope of the road and flows into the Monner de Vallparadís torrent, until it becomes a retaining wall with buttresses linked together with blind arches. At the highest part, a cantilever is formed that is used as a lookout point.

In 2003 the walls were declared a Bien cultural de interés local by the Generalitat de Catalunya with registration number 7597-I.

=== Bridges ===
Vallparadís Park forms a depression with an average slope of 10 meters (33 ft). For this reason, several bridges and footbridges cross the park along its length, connecting its two longitudinal ends.

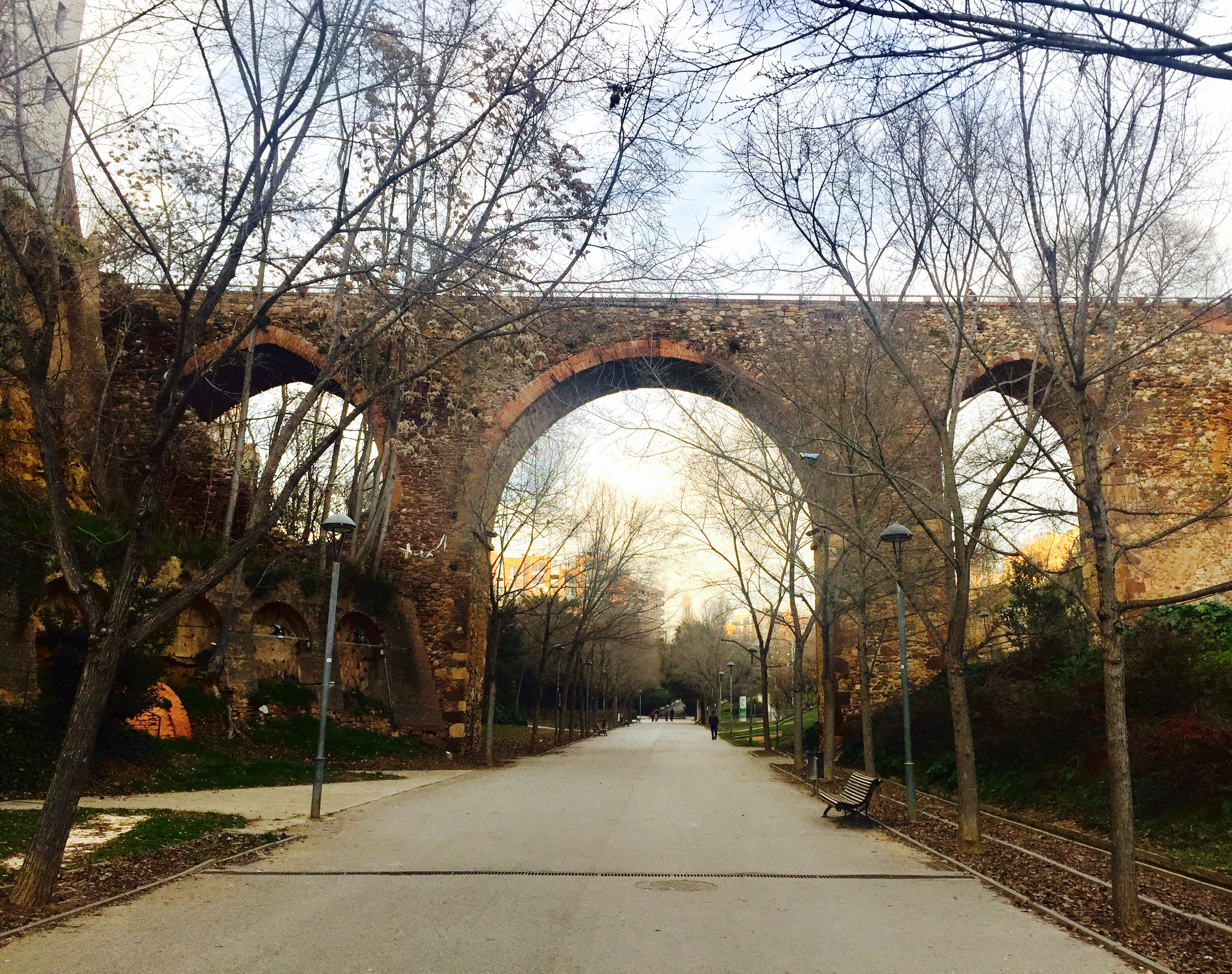
View of the Pont de Sant Pere from Vallparadís Park in January 2017.

In the western part of the bifurcation of the park is the Pont de Sant Pere, a structure dating from 1579, built by the councilors of the town of Sant Pere to the master builder Pere Pomers i Ramon Flotes. It joins the neighborhoods of Centre and Antic Poble de Sant Pere. The maximum height is 19.30 m (63.3 ft), the length is 57 m (187 ft) and it is 3.50 m (11.5 ft) wide. Through it you can access the churches of Sant Pere. It is formed by three arches of different widths: the central arch is semicircular, wider, and the lateral ones have pointed arches. It is made of common brickwork, except for the corner areas, which are ashlars. In 2006 it was definitively closed to vehicular traffic and is only open to pedestrians. Currently, the bridge is considered a Bien cultural de interés local.

Further south, when the two torrents have already joined, is the longest bridge in the park: the Pont del Passeig. It is a bridge that connects the Vallparadís and the Cementerio Viejo neighborhoods. The construction of this bridge, in 1895, was the first intervention of the Public Improvement Plan of the City Council to divert the northern exit of Terrassa. It is 112 m (367 ft) long by 16.13 m (52.9 ft) high and is formed by six arches supported by frustum pilasters of ashlars with stone string courses. The entire intrados is made of brick and at the back there is a roadway for vehicles arranged in four lanes, as well as a sidewalk on each of the two sides. The bridge has undergone two extensions in 1960 and 1990 and is currently protected as a Bien Cultural de Interés Local.

Between the Monner torrent to the 22 de Juliol avenue, there is the footbridge of the torrent of Les Bruixes, a footbridge that connects the Sant Valentí street with Bonaventura Castellet, following the old path of the village of Sant Pere de Terrassa. It was inaugurated on March 13, 1999.

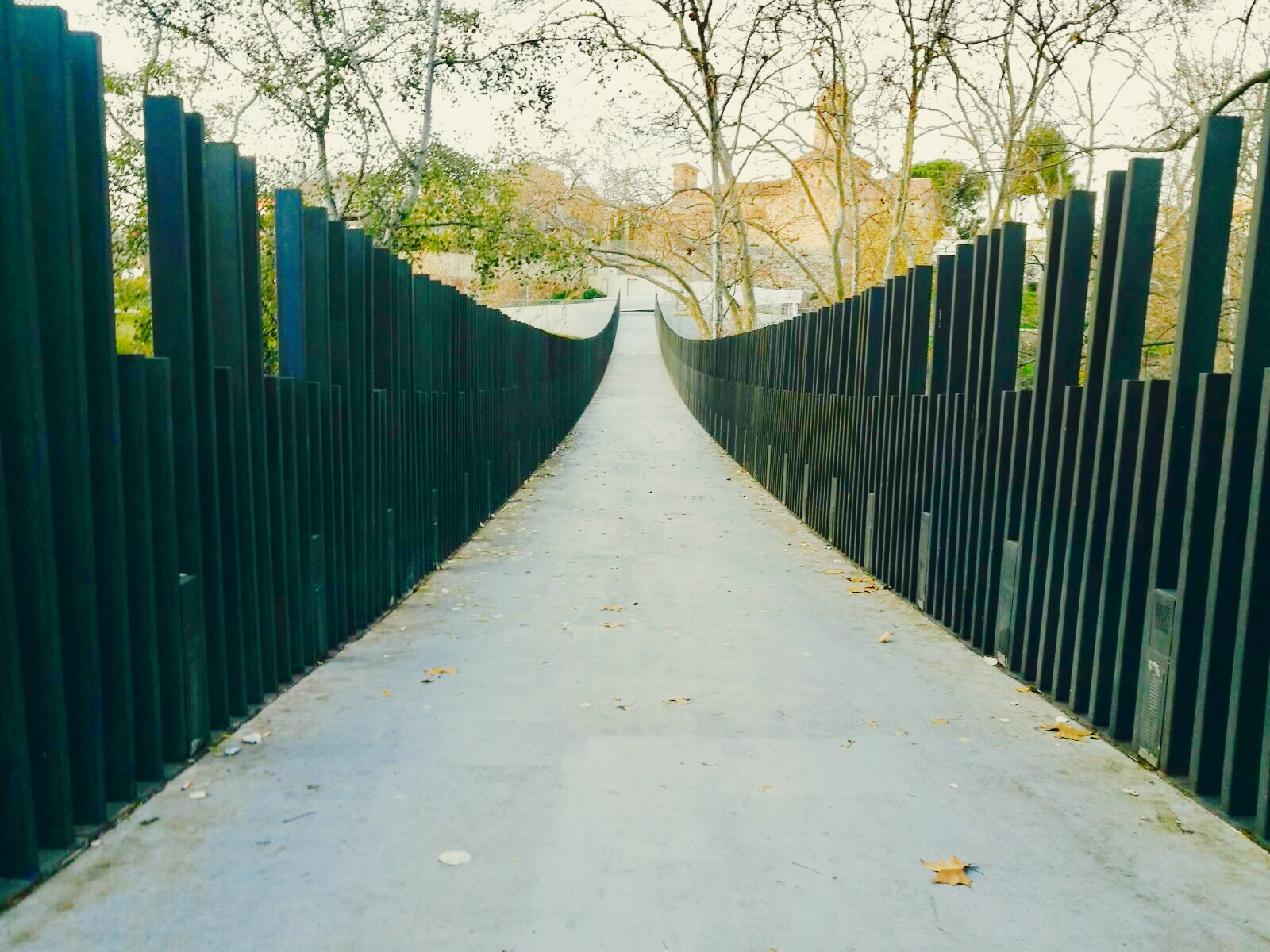
The footbridge of the Monner torrent. In the background you can glimpse the Monumental church complex of Sant Pere de Terrassa.

The Monner torrent footbridge, also known as the Sant Pere footbridge, is a bridge that was already projected in 1915, in the first urban planning project where Josep Maria Coll i Bacardí designed a semicircular bridge linking the churches of Sant Pere with Salmerón street. It was in 2004 that the Monner torrent footbridge was inaugurated, an 80 m (260 ft) bridge without pilasters supported by two cables, considered a unique engineering work in Europe and which has won the Catalonia Construction Awards 2005, Construmat Award 2005, 3rd Biennial Award of Architecture of Vallés 2005, International Puente de Alcántara Award 2005 and Footbrige Awards 2005. It has also been a finalist for the 2003 Bonaplata Award and the 2005 FAD Awards.

Continuing south, before reaching the Vallparadís swimming pool, the bridge of the Cementerio Viejo is located. In 1830, with the annexation to the city of the Vallparadís block, the provisional cemetery became the official cemetery of Terrassa. In the 19th century, it was accessed by a road that passed through the Vallparadís torrent. Once the Pont del Passeig was built in 1896, this path ceased to be functional and was removed. After the floods of Vallés in 1962, a lake was formed in this area and in 1967 a footbridge was built, known as the Pont del Cementiri Vell.

Once past the Vallparadís swimming pool, heading south, is the Font d'en Serracanta walkway, a footbridge inaugurated on April 28, 2007, next to the urbanized area between the Pont del Gall and the Santa Eulàlia Avenue. This footbridge connects Escudé street in the so-called 20th century neighborhood with Germà Joaquim street, in Can Palet. Structurally, the bridge is 101 m (331 ft) long, 3 m (9.8 ft) wide and weighs 46 tons. The structure is made of steel, supported on two pillars. The bridge has an elevator that connects the park with the footbridge.

Finally, on the approach to the southern end of the park, is the Pont de la Unió, a viaduct inaugurated on February 19, 2010, in the presence of the then mayor, Pere Navarro i Morera. It is a footbridge that connects the Can Palet neighborhood with the so-called 20th century neighborhood, between Morella street and the Rubí road. It consists of a 107 m-long (351 ft) frame and its name was chosen by the students of the schools President Salvans, Pau Vila, Andersen and Sagrat Cor de Jesús.

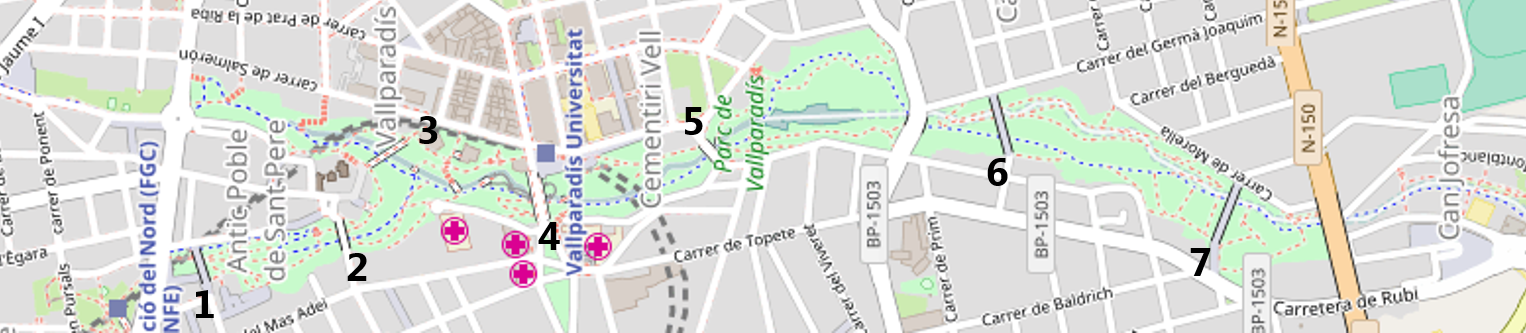
1. Footbridge of the torrent of Les Bruixes; 2. Pont de Sant Pere; 3. Sant Pere footbridge; 4. Pont del Passeig; 5. Pont del Cementiri Vell; 6. Font d'en Serracanta walkway; 7. Pont de la Unió

== Sculptures ==
Scattered throughout the park are a series of sculptures.

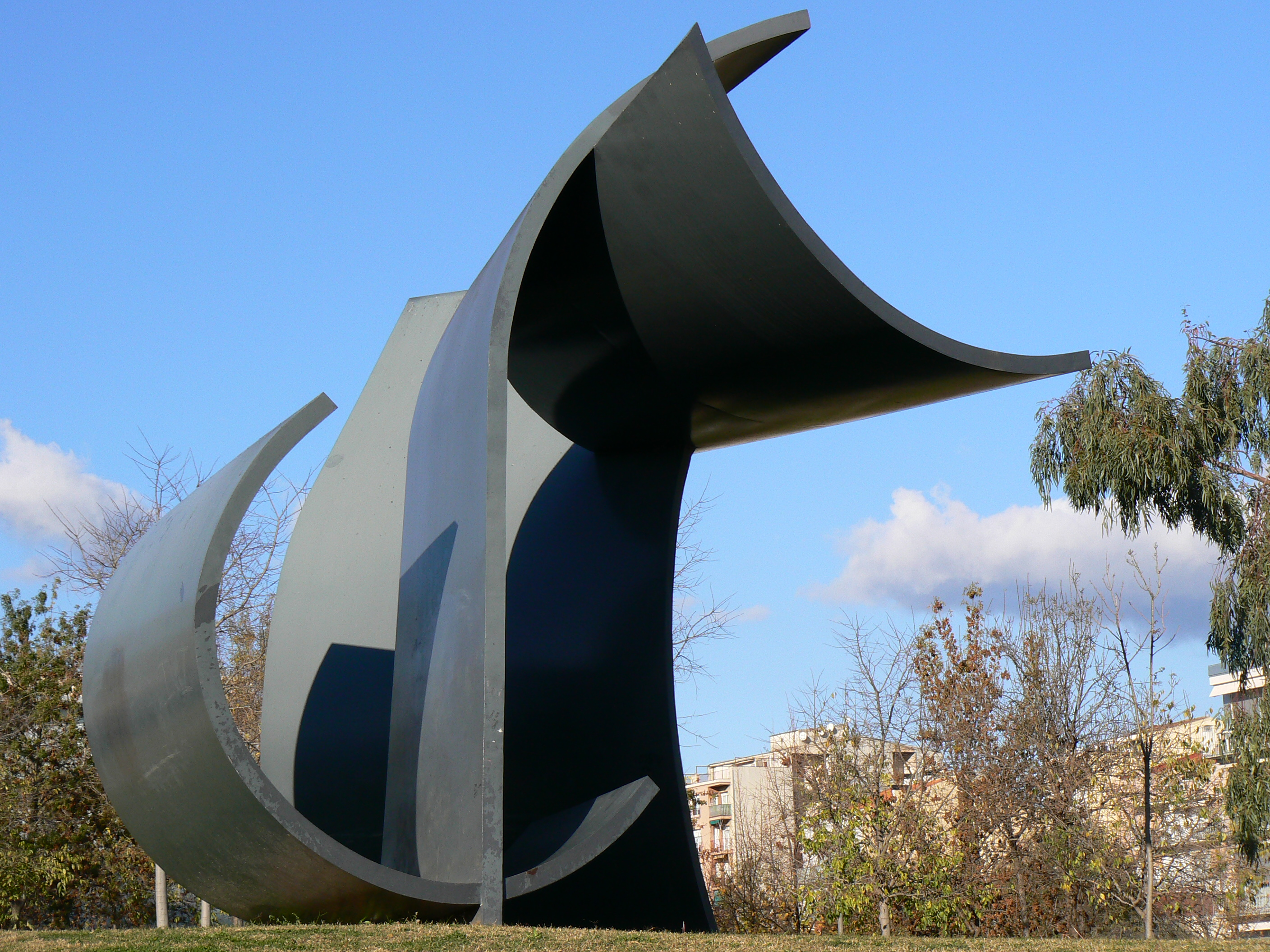
Homage to Malevich, by Jorge de Oteiza.

At the northern end of the park, next to the Parc del Nord, is located "Homage to Malevich" (in Catalan, Homenatge a Malèvitx). This sculpture is dedicated to Kazimir Malevich, a Russian painter, considered the creator of Suprematism. It is a work of Jorge de Oteiza, inaugurated on May 15, 1999. The piece had to be moved twice due to the urbanization of the so-called railwaymen's apartments and, later, for the construction of the Barcelona-Vallés line station. It weighs 26 tons and is made of zinc-coated metallized steel with a satin paint finish. The piece represents a test of a spatial rotation that Malevich called "Malevich's units".

In the eastern branch of the park, also at the northern end, is located "La sardana", a monument located in the so-called Pla de la Font de l'Apotecari del Parc de Vallparadís. It is the work of the Escola d'Arts i Oficis de Barcelona (Catalan for: Municipal School of Arts and Crafts of Barcelona). It is a tribute to the sardana —a typical Catalan dance performed in a group and in a circle—, which explains the characteristic shape of the monument. On April 25 and 26, 1998, in the municipality of San Juan de las Abadesas, the Obra del Ballet Popular de Cataluña proclaimed Terrassa as the pubilla of Catalonia. For this reason, one of the acts that took place was the inauguration of this monument, in an event presided over by the mayor of Terrassa at that time, Manuel Royes, and the president of the Obra del Ballet Popular de Cataluña, Joan Vidal, in which a commemorative plaque was unveiled. This celebration was enlivened by the performance of several local groups, who danced sardanas.

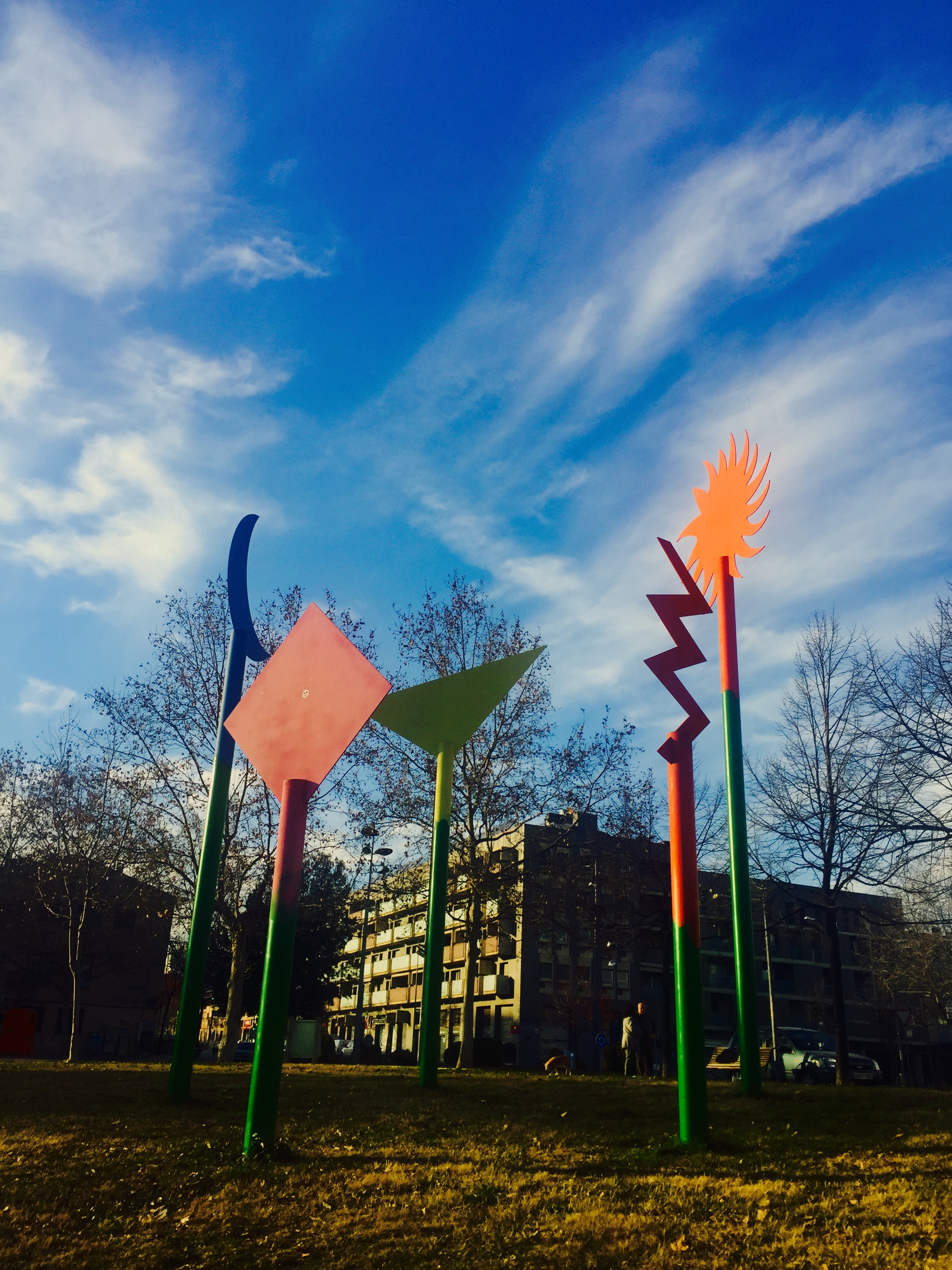
View of the sculptural ensemble Relacions de l'espai, from the park. Behind, the 22 de Juliol walkway.

In the northern part of the park, at the access next to the 22 de Juliol walkway —between the Monner torrent and the Pla de la Font de l'Apotecari—, there is since 1999 the sculpture Relacions de l'espai by Àngel Màdico, a sculpture made up of five elements of different colors that contrast with the surroundings, depending on the position of the observer. It consists of poles of more than three meters and at its end there are five different types of elements of nature and geometric shapes: the moon, the sun, the lightning bolt, a tyrangle and a rhombus in blue, yellow, red, green and pink colors, respectively. According to the author, the whole is an alloy of elements that contrast between nature itself and abstraction. This contrast is chosen so that the observer creates his own composition depending on the point of view in which he is with the possibility of altering it by changing its position. The sculpture of naïve character is one of the references of the users of the park.

In 2001 the proposal was approved for the installation in Vallparadís Park of the "Monumento a las víctimas del terrorismo" (Spanish for: Monument to the victims of terrorism) of 3 m (9.8 ft) in height, work of Jesús Fructuoso. (Note: Jesús Fructuoso suffered the consequences of terrorism on April 2, 1967, when his brother died as a result of an attack by ETA against the Civil Guard.) It is a stone monolith with a bronze window, 110 cm high and 80 cm wide, protruding from the central margin. It is located on the main promenade of the park, at the height of the Rambla de San Nebridio, next to the weather station, very close to the entrance of the swimming pool. The monument was proposed by Terrassa per la Pau and the Asociación de Víctimas del Terrorismo, with the support of the City Council of Terrassa. The sculpture was inaugurated on March 23, 2002, by the then mayor, Manuel Royes, thanks to which the author was able to symbolize, in his own words, "a door to freedom, to a future and to peace".

== Flora and fauna ==
Although Vallparadís is an urban park and the fauna is mostly limited to insects, birds and small vertebrates, throughout the park there is a wide variety of plants and trees, which is why the park is considered the green lung of the city.

=== Flora ===
The park, one of the largest in Catalonia, contains a great variety of plants and trees, among which the most important tree species are stone pines —29.2%—, plane trees —22.75%— and holm oaks —29.2%—. To a lesser extent, false asacias, mediterranean cypresses, olive and ash trees can be found. Other species that can be found are poplars, blue gum, laurels, tulip trees, chrerry plum trees, maples or lodogno trees. Regarding smaller varieties of plants, throughout the park you can appreciate honeysuckles, common ivy, purple morning glory, common barberries, rosemary, mock oranges or abelias.

The locations and their origin, as well as a description of each of the species in the park are as follows.

Name	Location	Origin	Features	Photograph (Note: The photographs correspond to images of the specimens, not to the specimens in the park itself.)
Birch	Monner torrent	Europe, East Asia and North Africa	White bark tree with small greenish flowers. The fruit is very small and the leaves are triangular in shape.	
Honey locust	Font d'en Sagrera torrent and Parc del Nord	North America	Deciduous tree up to 25 m (82 ft) tall with serrated green leaves with 20 or more leaflets and flowers with radiate symmetry.	
Tree of heaven	Under the Pont de Sant Pere and at the Font de la Puput.	China	Deciduous tree, 20 m (66 ft) tall, with smooth, whitish bark, compound leaves and broad, lobed, triangular leaflets. The flowers are small and greenish.	
Persian silk tree	Les Bruixes and Font d'en Sagrera torrents	Iran, Taiwan and China	It reaches up to 6 m (20 ft) in height. The leaves contain small, asymmetrical leaflets. Fruit up to 20 cm long.	
Judas tree	Les Ànimes torrent path to Montcada road.	Southern Europe and Asia	Small deciduous tree with dark brown rough bark and ocrazon-shaped leaves. Flowers with unequal petals, appear in April or May.	
Field maple	Font d'en Sagrera torrent.	Serra de l'Obac	Leaves divided into five lobes, 4 to 7 cm long. The fruit has two wings open at an angle of 180 degrees.	
Montpellier maple	Font d'en Sagrera torrent.	Australia	Tree up to 15 m (49 ft) tall, with simple greenish leaves with three lobes. Wings of the fruit arranged at an acute angle.	
Norway maple	Monner torrent.	Eurasia	Tree up to 30 m (98 ft) high, with simple leaves of 10 to 15 cm with five to seven lobes and yellowish green flowers.	
Silver maple	Hortes dels Frares, in the Font d'en Sagrera torrent and Les Ànimes torrent.	Eastern North America	Tree over 35 m (115 ft) tall and leaves with five toothed lobes. Greenish flowers in hanging clusters.	
Common hazel	Les Bruixes torrent.	Mediterranean Basin	Native shrub up to 6 m (20 ft) high and deciduous leaves. Brown fruits and flowers grouped in very dense inflorescences.	
Red horse-chestnut	Wall of the Casa Salvans, under the Casa Baumann.	Greece, Albania and Bulgaria	Deciduous tree over 20 m (66 ft) tall with leaves between five and seven toothed leaflets, white flowers.	
Atlas cedar	Behind La Muntanyeta restaurant.	Lebanon, Syria and Turkey	Tree that can reach 40 m (130 ft) in height with grayish fissured bark and primary ramifications, frequently horizontal.	
Mediterranean cypress	All over the park.	Greece, Iran and Turkey	Evergreen tree up to 30 m (98 ft) tall with dark, thin and superficially wrinkled bark. Green leaves arranged in four opposite rows of two by two.	
Common hawthorn	Font d'en Sagrera torrent.	Europe, North Africa and Asia	Small deciduous tree with small leaves with three to seven lobes and white flowers. The fruits are bright red.	
River red gum	Muntanyeta slope and Parc del Nord	Australia	Tree up to 40 m (130 ft) tall with straight and cylindrical trunk and greenish brown bark. Elongated leaves with aromatic glands and isolated white or red flowers.	
Sycamore	Font d'en Sagrera torrent.	Central and Northern Europe	Deciduous tree that can reach 30 m (98 ft) in height, with smooth bark. Simple and toothed leaves with three to five lobes.	
Narrow-leaved ash	Font d'en Sagrera torrent and Parc del Nord	Southeast Asia, Southern Europe and Northeastern Africa.	Deciduous tree up to 20 m (66 ft) high with opposite leaves with up to thirteen leaflets and fruits gathered in clusters.	
European beech	Monner torrent, next to the Sant Pere footbridge.	Europe	Deciduous tree up to 30 m (98 ft) tall with smooth grayish bark and oval or elliptical translucent leaves and flowers that bear between two and three fruits.	
European nettle tree	Monner torrent and Rector Oms square viewpoint.	Mediterranean Basin	Deciduous tree with elongated leaves and rough to the touch with three main nerves at its base. Solitary axillary flowers and edible fruit.	
Strawberry tree	Les Bruixes torrent and Pont del Cementiri Vell.	Mediterranean basin and southwest Ireland	With thick leaves, the fruit is a rough edible berry that ripens after a year when the tree is in flower again.	
Mimosa	Les Ànimes torrent, next to the park office.	Australia	Petiolate leaves without stipules, bluish-green and more than 10 cm long.	
Paper mulberry	Talús de la Mútua, near the mini-train circuit.	Japan, Malaysia, China and Taiwán	Deciduous tree up to 12 m (39 ft) high with smooth bark and leaves 7 to 20 cm long.	
Olive	Throughout the park, in greater numbers in the Les Ànimes torrent.	Mediterranean Basin	Tree with grayish green leaves on one side and whitish on the other. Its fruit, the olive, blooms in late spring and early summer.	
Italian maple	Font d'en Sagrera torrent.	North Africa and Iberian Peninsula	Tree up to 15 m (49 ft) high, with simple leaves with five lobes and few flowers, these are greenish or yellowish.	
Riven oak	Les Ànimes torrent, in front of the park office.	Polynesia, Malaysia and Australia	Evergreen tree up to 20 m (66 ft), straight trunk and wide bark. The leaves are not visible to the naked eye and the fruits are similar to conifer cones.	
Tulip tree	Font d'en Sagrera torrent.	North America	Tree reaching 40 m (130 ft) with a pyramidal form. Flowers are yellow and fruit are brown.	

=== Fauna ===
Fauna of Vallparadís Park

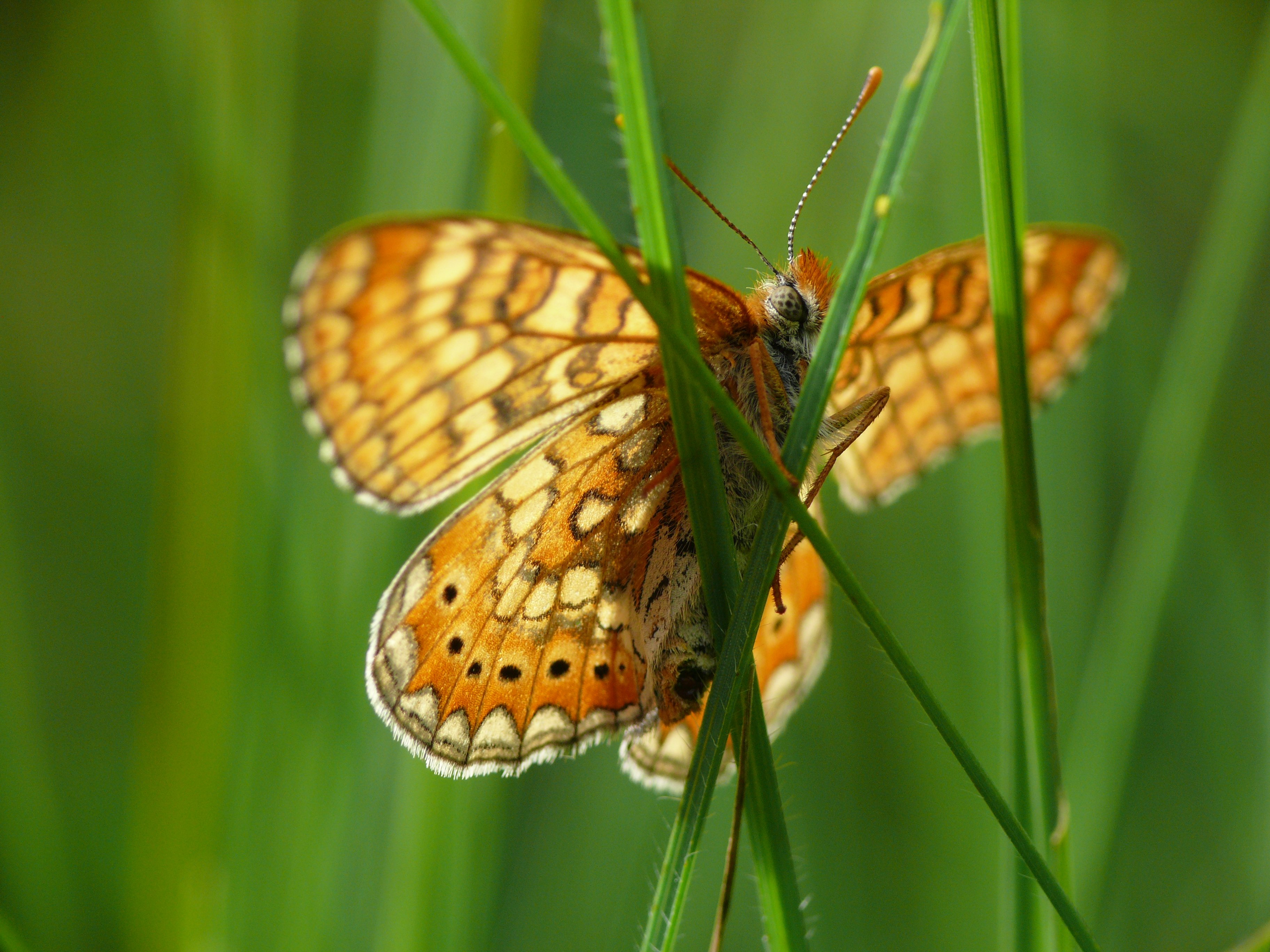
Marsh fritillary
(Euphydryas aurinia)

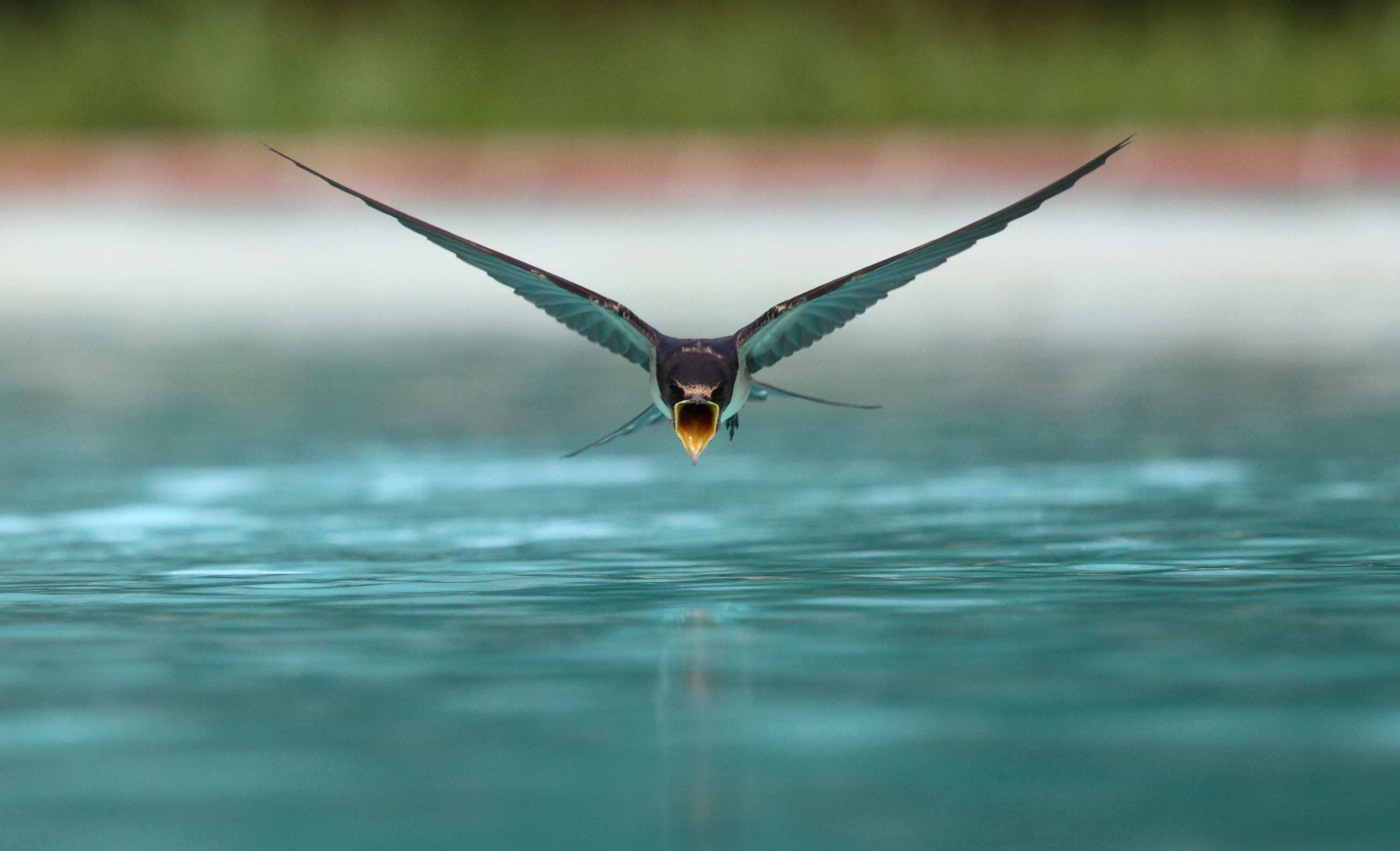
Common house martin
(Delichon urbicum)

Examples of the fauna of Vallparadís Park

Being an urban park located in full contact with the municipality of Terrassa, Vallparadís has the same fauna that characterizes the city, basically composed of small mammals such as various types of bats and shrews, and others more common in large populations such as mice and cats.

As for invertebrates, you can find in the park coleoptera such as acilius sulcatus or stictonectes lepidus, lepidoptera such as the Marsh fritillary or the Spanish moon moth and gastropods with various types of snails.

The most common animals in the park are birds. Apart from species such as the house sparrow, the rock dove, the great tit, the magpie, the serin or the blackbird, which are abundant in the green areas of the cities, the fact that the municipality of Terrassa is located a short distance from the Sierra del Obac, you can see birds of prey such as the short-toed snake eagle, the Eurasian sparrowhawk, the Eurasian hobby and other nocturnal species such as the Eurasian scops owl, the barn owl or the Long-eared owl. Other smaller species that can be observed are the crested tit, the blue rock thrush, the song thrush, the sandpiper or the common firecrest. At certain times of the year you can see migratory birds such as the black redstart, white wagtail, the European golden oriole or the common house martin.

== Facilities ==
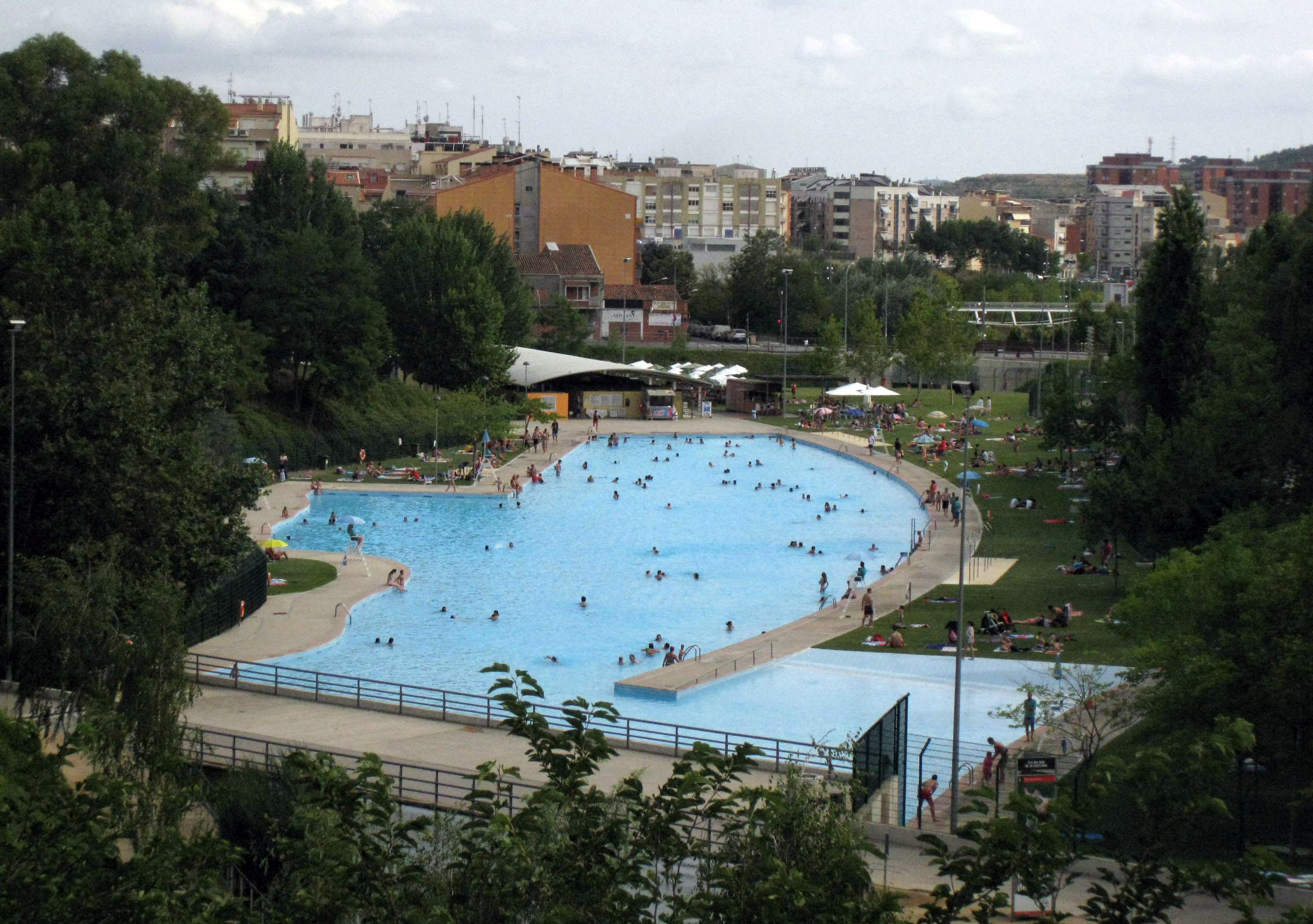
The Vallparadís swimming pool, in summer 2012.

The green space of Vallparadís park has several facilities —apart from the conventional ones of an urban park— that provide an extra service to users. These include a 180-meter-long swimming pool, a large-scale train that runs through the center of the park, a bio-healthy playground, children's areas, restaurants and full accessibility for people with reduced mobility, despite the park's varying levels.

=== Municipal swimming pool ===
In the southern center of the park, between the Pont del Cementiri Vell and the Montcada road, is the municipal swimming pool, also called Vallparadís lake, which opens at the beginning of the summer, at the same time as Saint John's Eve and the end of the academic year. These facilities offer their services until September, including the programming of several activities dedicated to the youngest.

The pool, 180 m (590 ft) long has a total surface area of approximately 5,000 m^{2} (54,000 sq ft). and since June 2014, the pool is managed by Club Natació Terrassa.

=== Miniature train ===
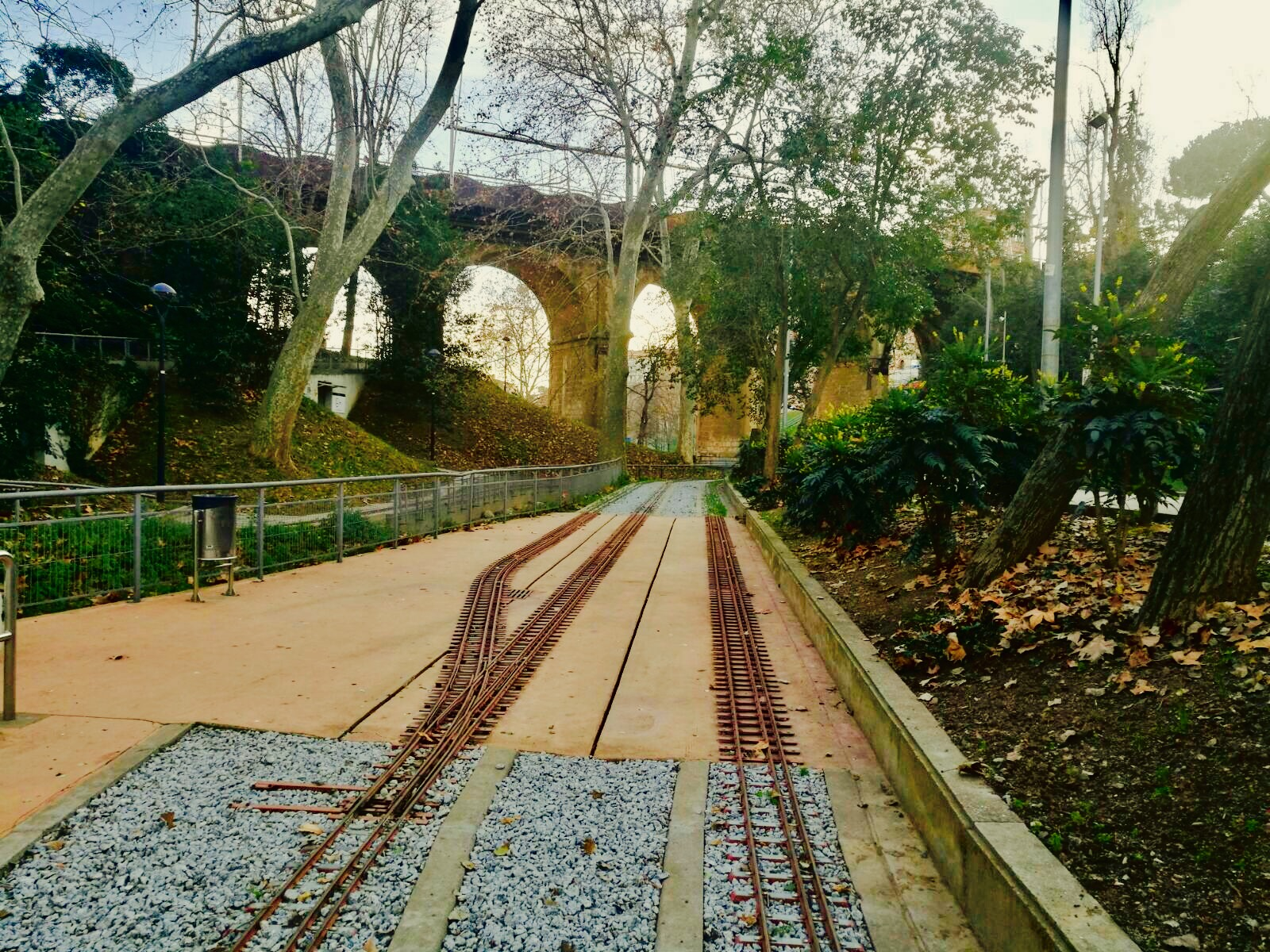
View of the miniature train tracks in the park. In the background, the Jacquard bridge.

At the center of the park is a large-scale, open-air train known as manned model railroading or live steam. It has a 340 m (1,120 ft) route for a track gauge of 127 and 184 mm with eleven switches, two bridges —one of them rotating—, two tunnels, a traffic circle, a locomotive garage and a workshop. The circuit also includes a switch lever from the Zona Franca station in Barcelona.

The railroad was pre-inaugurated on February 18, 1995, by the then President of the Government of Catalonia, Jordi Pujol and the Mayor of Terrassa, Manuel Royes. Likewise, the train was completely inaugurated on June 29, 1996, and since that date the so-called International Meeting of Vaporistas has been held at the site.

Since 1996, between October and June, every week, the Vallparadís Railway has made its facilities available to the Municipal Board of Education so that students and teachers can learn about the history and operation of the miniature train. Since then and as of April 2017, approximately 14 000 users have made educational visits to the park's facilities where they are taught about its energy sources such as electricity, batteries, fuel batteries or mineral coal, as well as the operation of electric and steam locomotives.

== Events ==
Being a green space inside one of the largest urban centers of Catalonia, as is the town of Terrassa, (Note: Terrassa is in competition with Badalona to be the third most populated city in Catalonia, only surpassed by Barcelona and L'Hospitalet de Llobregat, in terms of population.) the park is used for many events and outdoor activities among which include for its popularity and number of spectators, the Picnic Jazz, a free jazz festival held every year, between March and April and attended by thousands of people, the Holi festival —or festival of colors— which takes place every spring and in which thousands of colored pigments are thrown into the air, according to Hindu tradition, as well as the burial of the carnival or the children's festival during the celebrations of the city's festivals.

=== Picnic Jazz ===
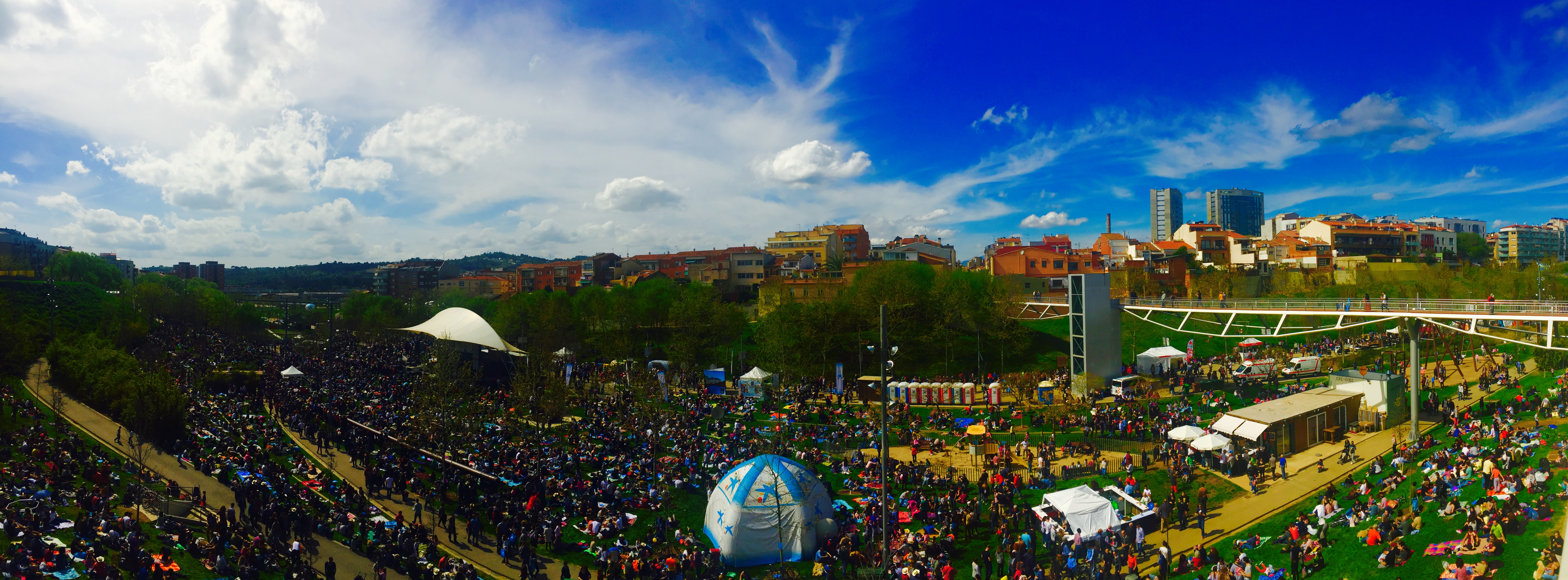
General view of the Picnic Jazz, in March 2017. On the left, the neighborhood of Can Jofresa, on the right, the bridge of the Font d'en Serracanta walkway.

Since 1982 the Pícnic Jazz has been held in the park, an event that is part of the Terrassa Jazz Festival and attracts thousands of spectators every year between March and April. The event brings together different musicians, both internationally renowned and new emerging figures. During its celebrations around 3500 musicians have performed in more than 800 concerts, and exhibitions, film sessions, conferences and tributes have been held. Musicians such as Stan Getz, Chet Baker, Dexter Gordon, Tete Montoliu, Dizzy Gillespie, Stéphane Grappelli, Elvin Jones, Art Blakey and Ray Brown have performed on the stages of Vallparadís. For the occasion, different types of services will be available in the park, such as a record fair, merchandising points of sale, different restaurants and a free bicycle parking service.

=== Holi Festival ===
Holi Festival in May 2018

In the month of May, the so-called Holi festival or festival of colors is celebrated in the park. It is a party of Hindu origin that is celebrated to honor the arrival of spring and consists of throwing large amounts of powdered pigments of different colors into the air so that, when falling, it mixes and permeates among all participants. It is an activity with Hindu religious roots, which has been appropriated by the West over time and in which, according to tradition, each person can release, forgive and forget the mistakes made in the past, as well as pay or forgive debts and reinitiate contact with people. The event is attended by thousands of people every year and is organized by members of the Terrassasamba impact group.

=== Burial of the carnival ===
The burial of the carnival (in Catalan, enterrament del carnestoltes) ends every year in the Park of Vallparadís, on Ash Wednesday. The event is held in the afternoon and is the final culmination of Terrassa's carnival festivities. The activity has been held since 1991, by means of a funeral procession that unfolds as a fight of the like-minded characters of His Majesty and Lent against their acolytes. The burial ends with a bonfire to burn the carnival, skeleton dances and the ghost of death. In the act, the volunteers dress up as all kinds of characters in black and the procession starts from the City Hall, heading to the park. More than twenty associations of popular culture and about 400 volunteers participate.

=== Children's major festival ===
Every year, during three days, at the beginning of July and at the same time as the celebration of the main festival of Terrassa, takes place in the Vallparadis park the so-called children's major festival, which is dedicated to the youngest and in which all kinds of performances such as theater, circus, storytelling, animation, magic or workshops are carried out. These activities include the participation of various entertainment companies. On the last day, the so-called "gran festa del dilluns" (in Catalan, great Monday party) takes place, in which hot chocolate is distributed, stories are told, the water festival and a concert for children are held.

== Access ==
Because Vallparadís crosses the center of Terrassa from north to south, the park has multiple access points.

=== Railroad ===
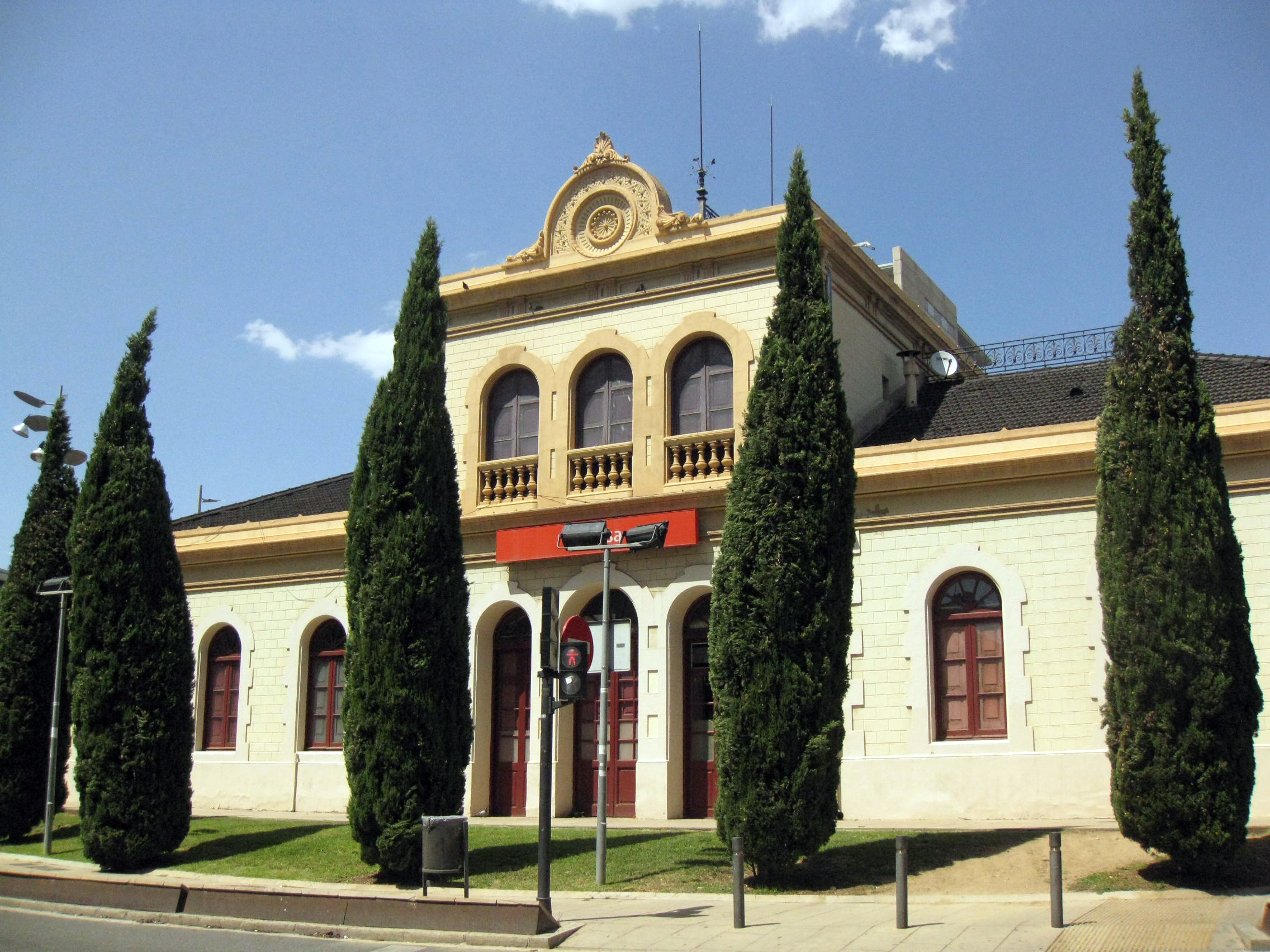
The Terrassa station, which runs through the north of the park, is listed as a Cultural Asset of Local Interest.

At the north end of the park from the west fork corresponding to the Monner stream, is located the Terrassa station or North station that has the Media Distancia service operated by Renfe and is part of the R4 line of the Cercanias Barcelona network. The building, dating from 1901, is listed as a Bien Cultural de Interés Local by the Government of Catalonia.

In the center of the park is the Vallparadís Universitat station. It is an extension of the Barcelona-Vallés line of the Ferrocarriles de la Generalidad de Cataluña.

=== Bus lines ===
Since some of the city's main thoroughfares run through the park, many bus lines pass through its bridges and crossings along its entire length. The northern part of the park is served by Líneas H —which crosses the park transversally— and 2, which connects the Rambla station with the East station. Lines 4 and 7, the latter running parallel to the park from north to south, cross the center of the park. Lines 8, 9 and 10, to a greater or lesser extent, run through part of the park.

=== Road networks ===
Three of the city's main avenues cross Vallparadís Park by road or bridge.

- At its peripheral limits, at the northern end where the North Station is located, the park begins at the same 22 de Juliol Avenue, a road that connects the city of Terrassa from east to west, from the neighborhood of Can Tries de Viladecavalls to Sabadell through the neighborhood of Torrebonica.
- Jaqcuard Avenue crosses over the center of the park by means of the Pont del Passeig. The road connects the university area, where the Terrassa Engineering School and the Vallparadís Universitat station are located, with the commercial and economic center of the city.
- In the southern area, Santa Eulàlia Avenue crosses the park through the Pont del Cementiri Vell. This avenue is also identified as the N-150, which corresponds to the road that connects the C-16 highway, west of Terrassa, with the C-17 highway in Montcada i Reixac.

The most direct access from outside the city is through the Terrassa center exit from the C-58 highway, until you reach the Montcada road, which is located to the right of the first traffic circle, and from there you can access the south-central part of the park.

== Multimedia gallery ==
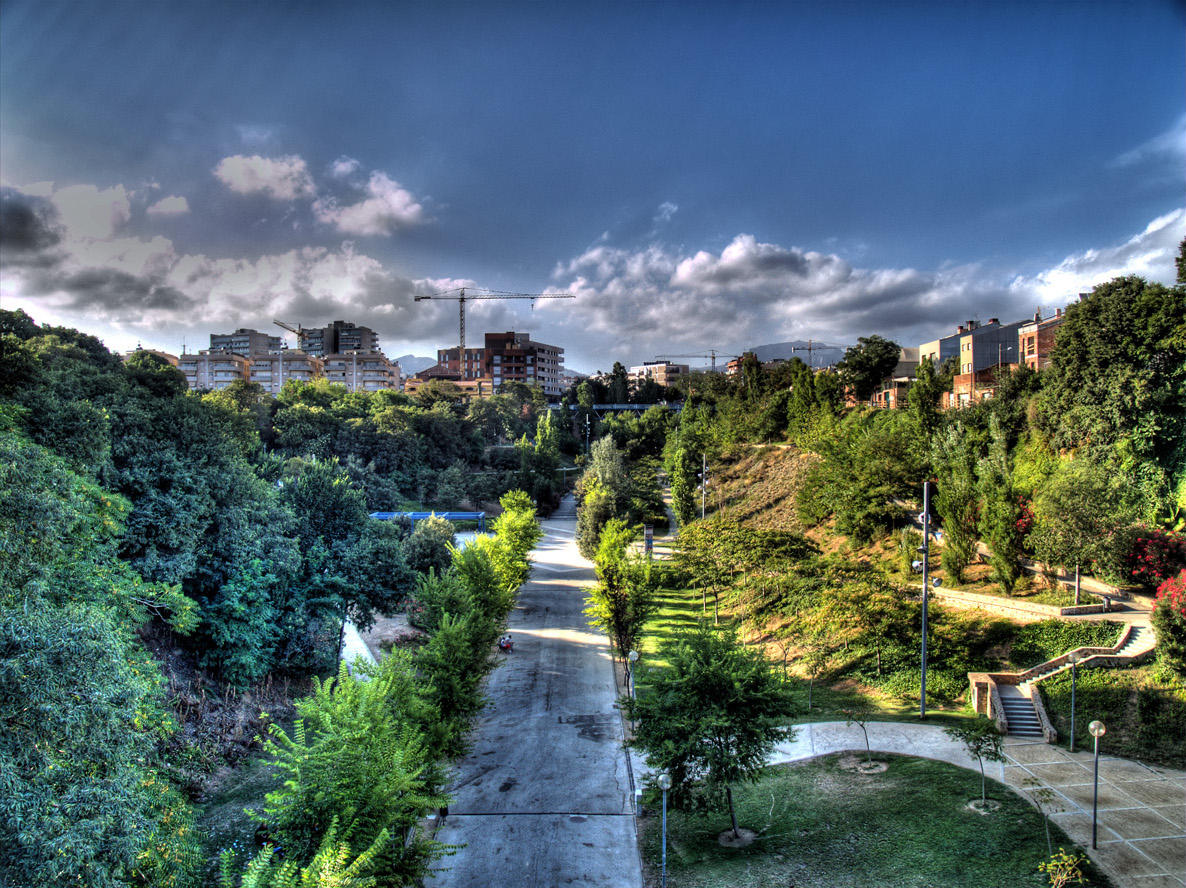
Les Bruixes torrent.

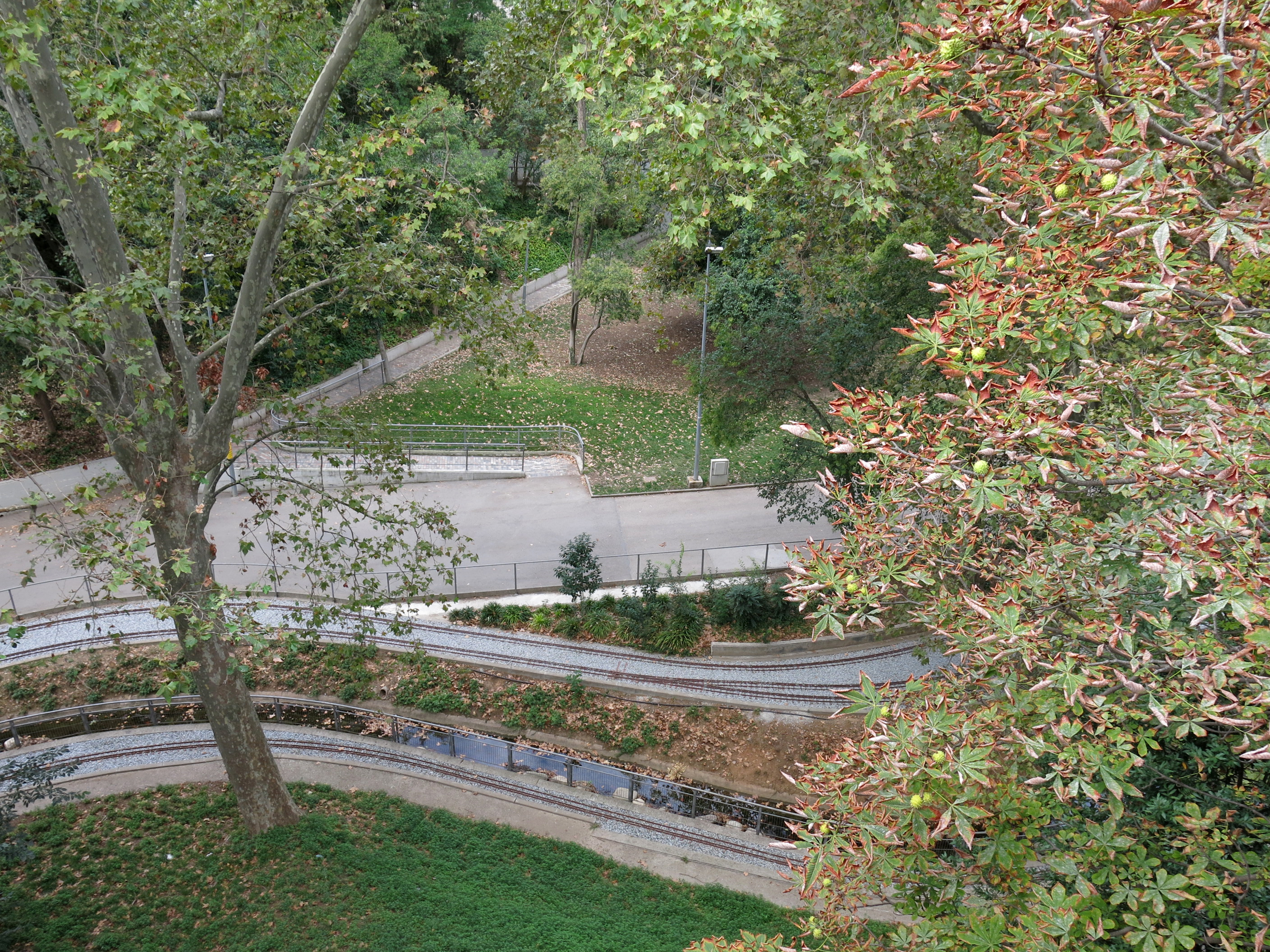
Park from Pont del Passeig

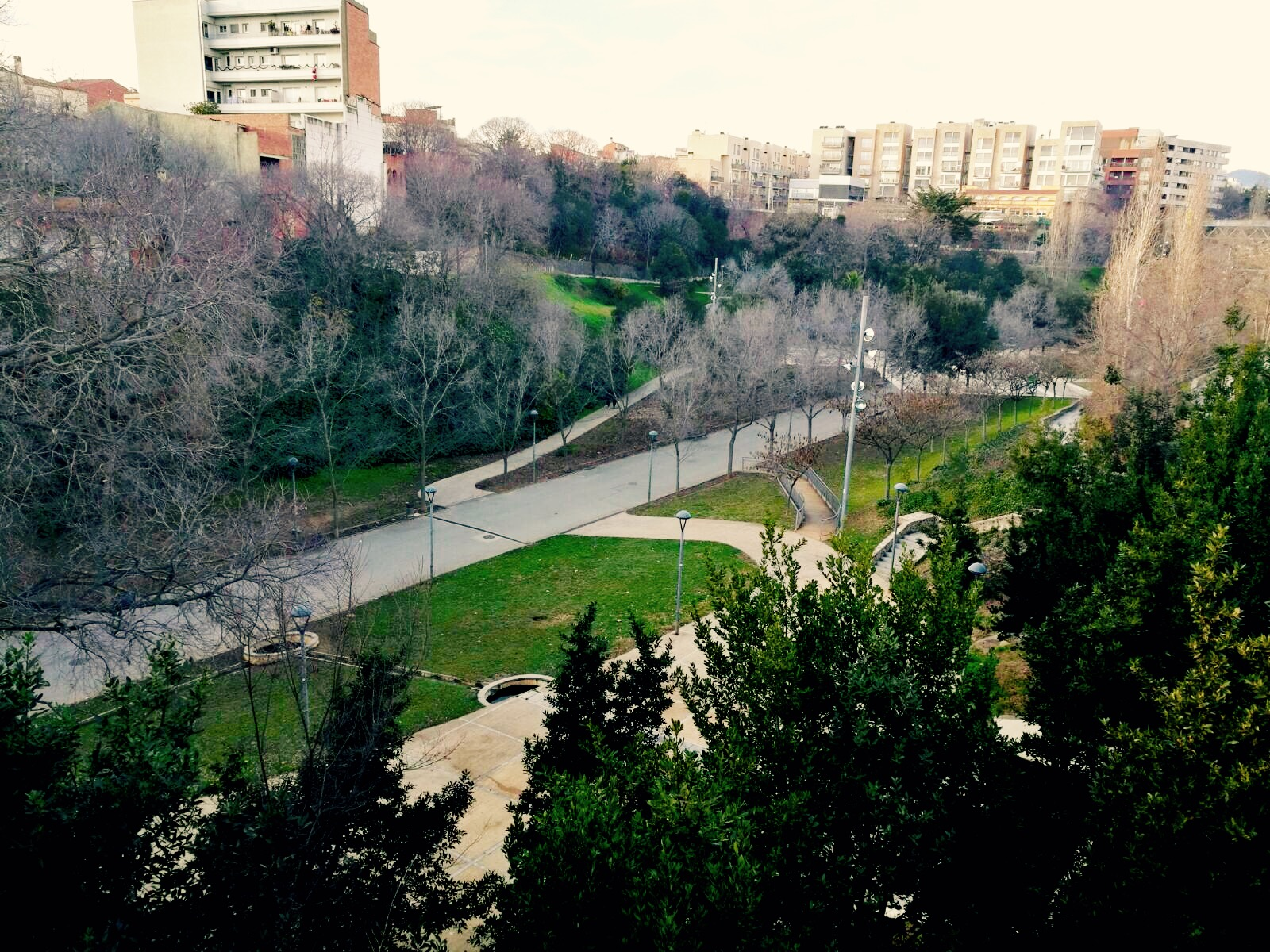
Partial view of the park.

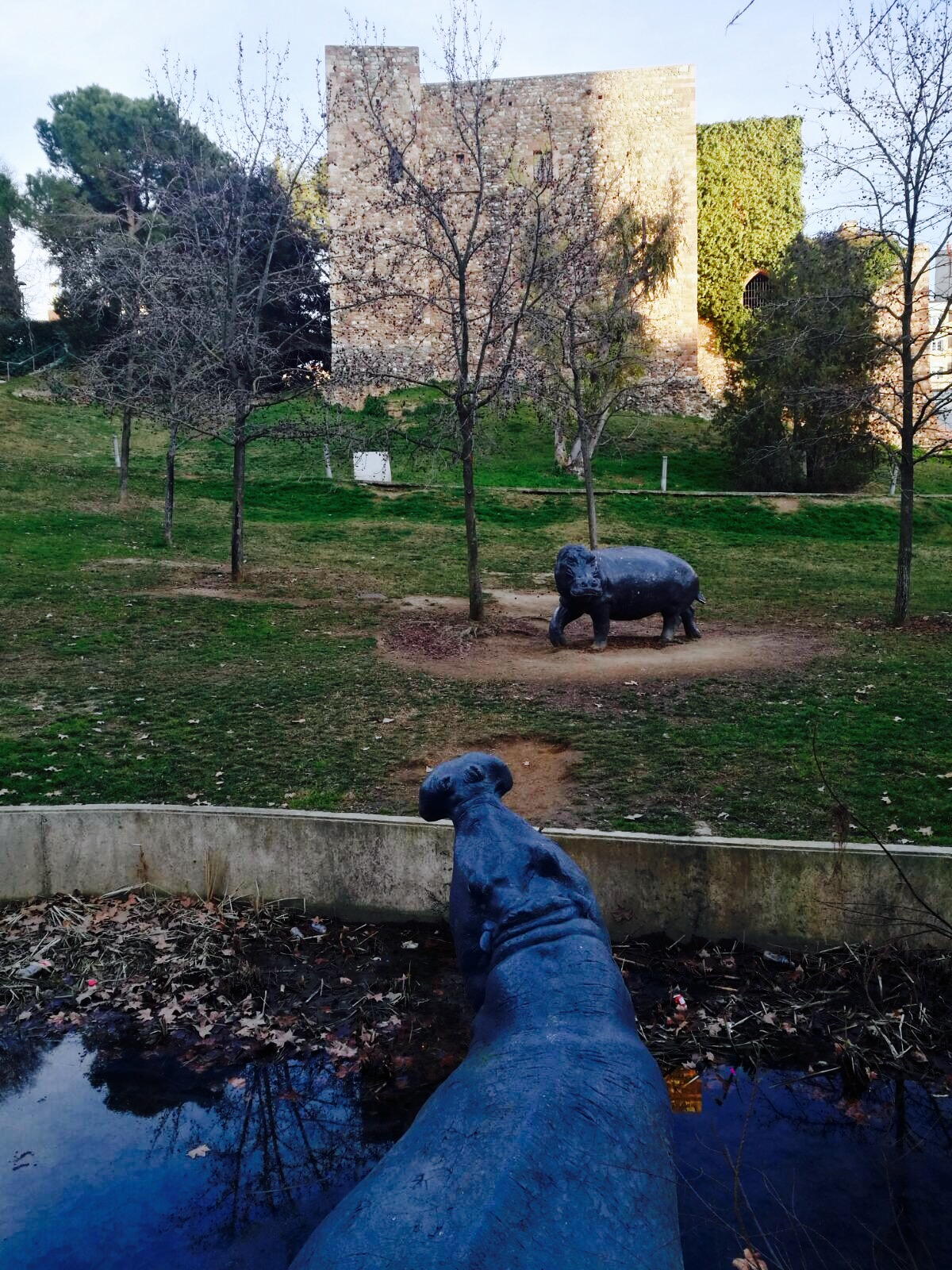
Hippos and castle.

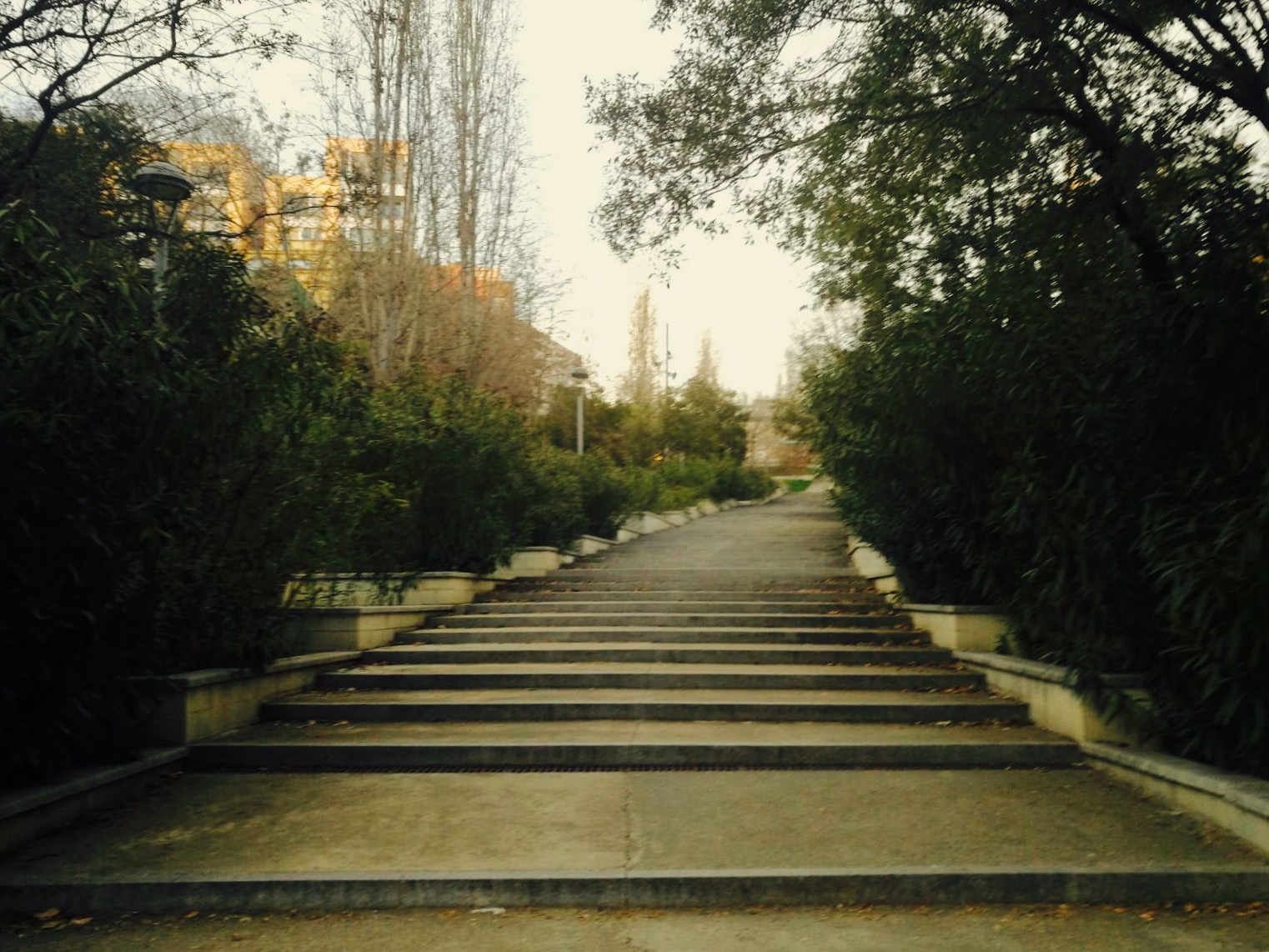
Stairway in Monner torrent.

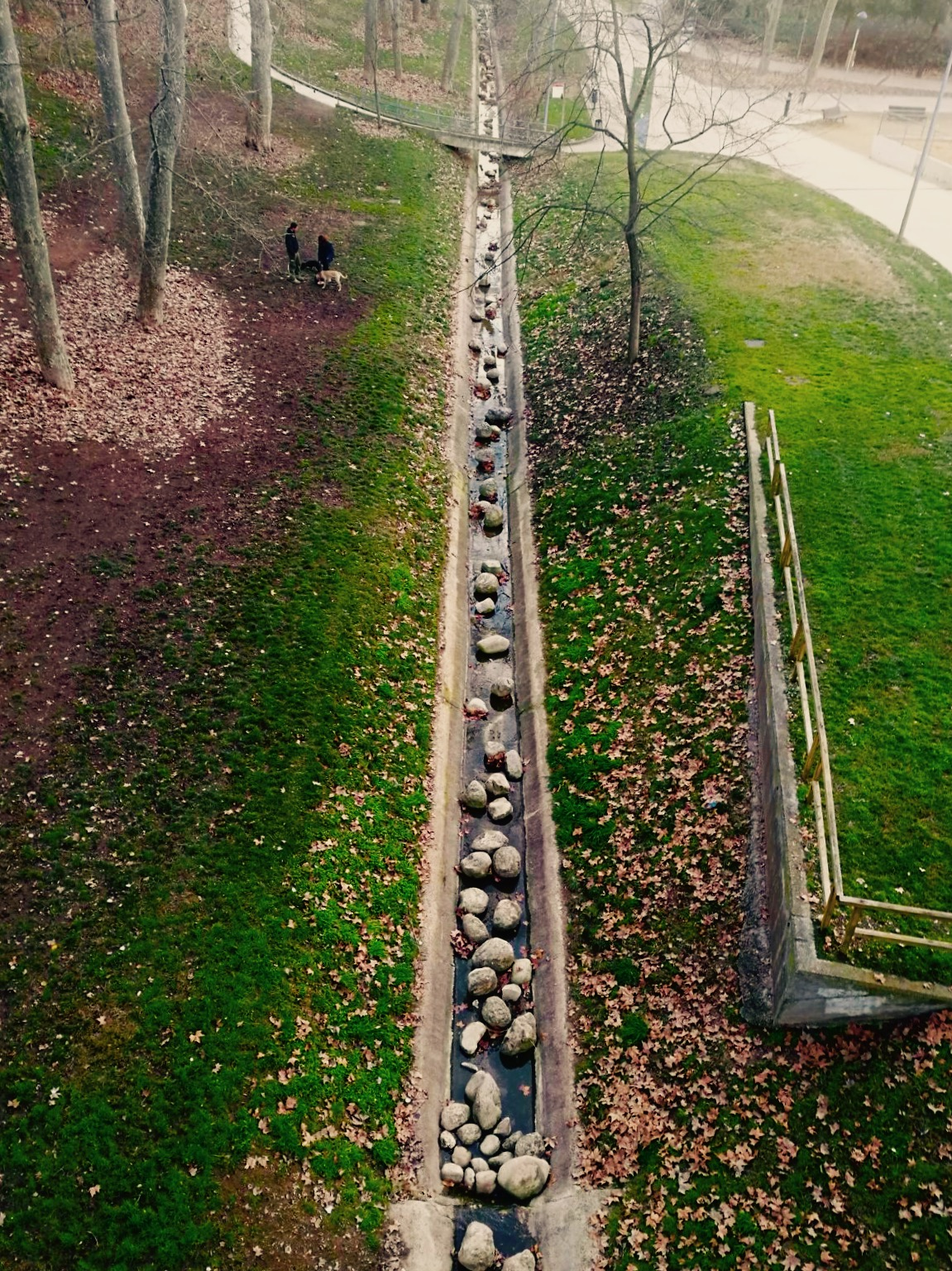
Canal in Vallparadís.

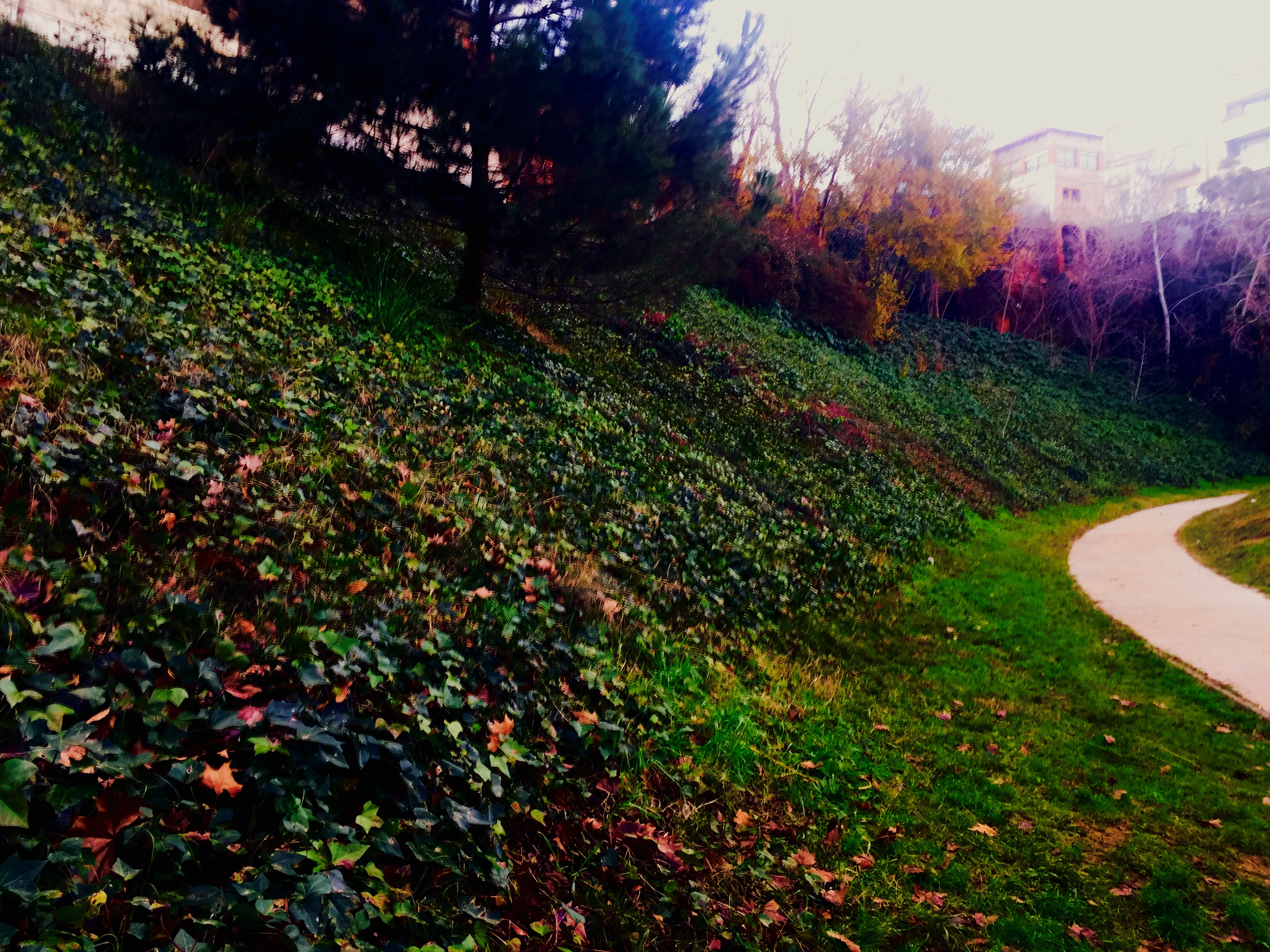
Embankment in the center of the park.

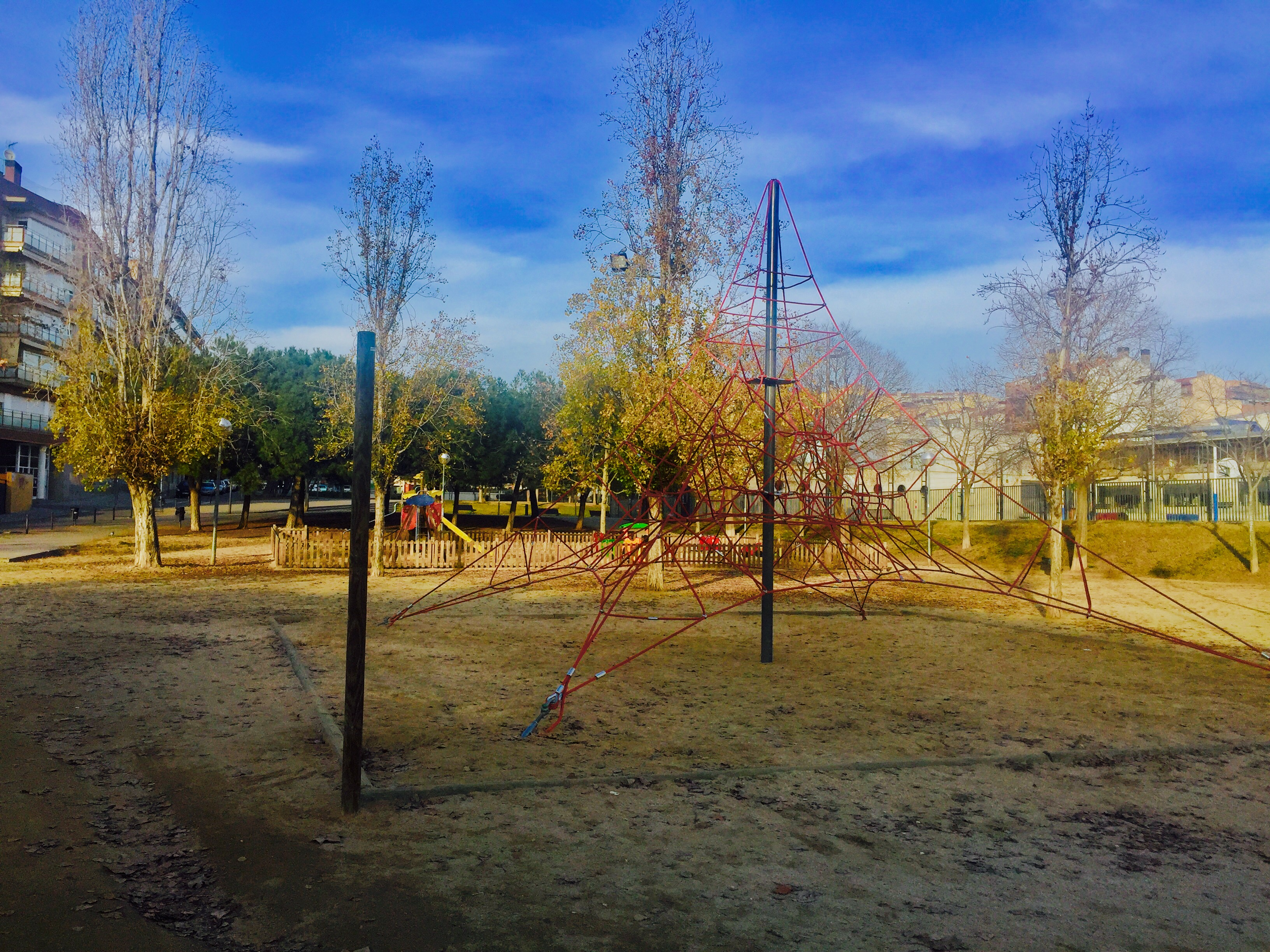
Children's playground in the north zone.

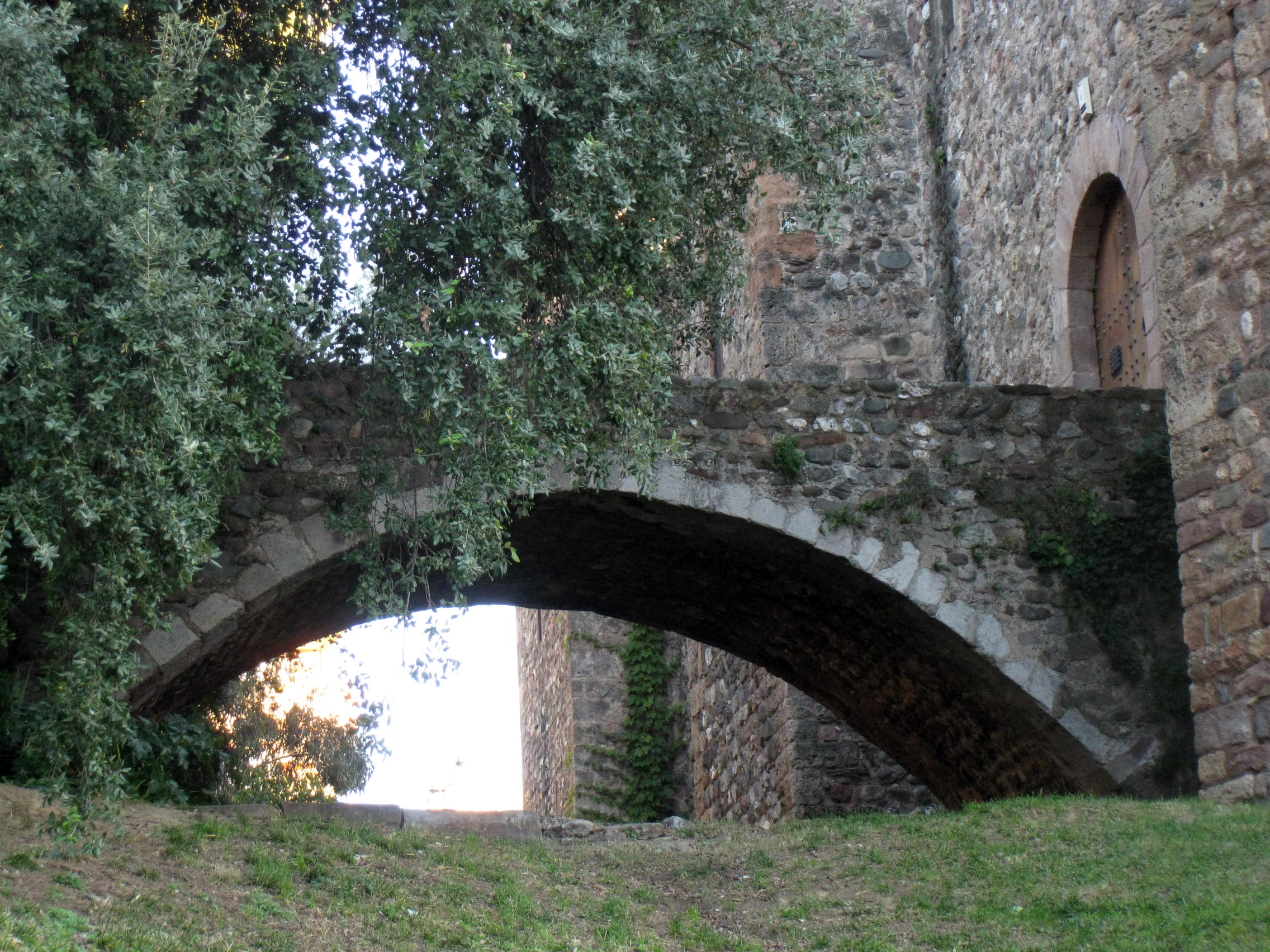
Carthusian castle bridge.

Vallparadís Park from north to south. 0:01: Vint-i-dos de Juliol Avenue. 0:37: Monumental church complex of Sant Pere de Terrassa. 0:45: Sant Pere footbridge. 1:19: Pont del Passeig. 1:23: Miniature train. 2:07: Pont del Cementiri Vell. 2:24: Vallparadís Swimming Pool. 2:35: Monument to the victims of terrorism. 3:19: Passage of the Font d'en Serracanta. 4:34: Pont de la Unió. 5:10: Can Jofresa neighborhood.

== See also ==
- Park Güell
- Parc de la Ciutadella
- Gardening in Spain
- List of Bienes de Interés Cultural in the Province of Barcelona
- Parks and gardens of Barcelona

== Bibliography ==
- Museus i Centres de Patrimoni Cultural a Catalunya (in Catalan). Barcelona: Departamento de Cultura de la Generalidad de Cataluña. 2010. p. 121. ISBN 978-84-393-5437-6.
- Agustí, J.; Carrera, L.; Garcés, M.; Parés, J.M. (1997). The Vallesian mammal suc-cession in the Vallès-Penedès basin (northeast Spain): Paleomagnetic calibrationand correlation with global event. pp. 149–180.
- Alba, David M.; Aurell Garrido, Josep; Madurell Malapereira, Joan; Moya-sola, Salvador (2008). Paleontologia i geologia del jaciment del Pleistocè inferior de Vallparadís (Terrassa, Vallès Occidental) (in Catalan).
- Arribas, A.; Palmqvist, P. (1998). "Taphonomy and palaeoecology of an assemblage of large mammals: Hyaenid activity in the Lower Pleistocene site at Venta Micena". Geobios. 31: 3–47. doi:10.1016/S0016-6995(98)80056-9.
- Benaiges Torres, Sandra (2014). Las plantas ornamentales y los problemas de alergias respiratorias en el parque de Vallparadís y en el de la Cogullada de Terrassa (PDF) (in Spanish). Universidad Autónoma de Barcelona.
- Berástegui, X.; Casanovas, J.; Moyá, S. (1997–1998). "El jaciment paleontològic de Cal Guardiola. Una nestra oberta al plistocè inferior de Catalunya. Contextualització geològica". Tribuna de Arqueología (in Catalan): 255–277.
- Carbonell Basté, Silvia (2008). La col·lecció de teixits coptes del Centre de Documentació i Museu Tèxtil de Terrassa (in Catalan). Vol. 2. Quaderns del Museu Episcopal de Vic.
- Cirlot, Lourdes (1993). Primeras vanguardias artísticas: textos y documentos (in Spanish). Labor. p. 201. ISBN 9788433535306.
- Chueca i Abancó, Jordi (2007). Els arbres del Parc de Vallparadís. Guia d'identificació (in Catalan). Icònica.
- Amigos del arte románico (2009). Les esglésies de Sant Pere de Terrassa: de seu episcopal a conjunt monumental : II taula rodona (in Catalan) (1st ed.). Barcelona: Instituto de Estudios Catalanes. ISBN 9788472836075.
- Friend, Peter F.; Dabrio, Cristino J. (1996). Tertiary Basins of Spain: The Stratigraphic Record of Crustal Kinematics. Cambridge University Press. pp. 97–105. ISBN 9780521461719.
- García, Joan; Martínez, Kenneth; Carbonell, Eudald (2011). Continuity of the first human occupation in the Iberian Peninsula: Closing the archaeological gap (Thesis). Elsevier Masson.
- Martín García, Juan José (2007). La industria textil de Pradoluengo (1534–2007): la pervivencia de un núcleo industrial (in Spanish). Junta de Castilla y León, Consejería de Cultura y Turismo. p. 470. ISBN 9788497184250.
- Matas i Blanxart, M. Teresa (2001). Les Esglésies de Sant Pere de Terrassa: de seu episcopal a conjunt monumental (in Catalan). Institut d'Estudis Catalans. pp. 9–10. ISBN 9788472836075.
- Meca Acosta, Benet; Partida Amores, Natividad (2010). Casa Coll i Bacardí, Terrassa. Investigación história de una casa modernista (PDF) (Thesis) (in Spanish).
- Moro i García, Antonio (1993). Generalitat de Catalunya (ed.). El fossat nord del castell cartoixa de Vallparadís : Terrassa, Vallès Occidental (in Catalan). Generalitat de Catalunya, Departament de Cultura. ISBN 8439328451. Archived from the original on January 16, 2017.
- Postigo Mijarra, Jose M.; Burjachs, Francesc; Gómez Manzaneque, Fernando; Morla, Carlos (2007). "A palaeoecological interpretation of the lower–middle Pleistocene Cal Guardiola site (Terrassa, Barcelona, NE Spain) from the comparative study of wood and pollen samples". Review of Palaeobotany and Palynology. 146 (1–4): 247–264. doi:10.1016/j.revpalbo.2007.05.003.
- Ruisánchez, Manuel; Bacardit, Francesc; Pons, Ferran; García, Montserrat (2012). "Parque de Vallparadís – Can Jofresa. Terrassa". Afasia Archzine (in Spanish).
- Sanllehí Bitrià, Enric (2005). Vallparadís: la llarga i encara inacabada transformació d'un torrent (in Catalan).
- Soler i Palet, Josep (1906). Contribució a la historia antiga de Catalunya: Egara-Terrassa (in Catalan). Library of Catalonia: Real Academia de Buenas Letras de Barcelona.
