= Terrassa Museum =

Coordinates: 41.5628°N 2.0123°E

The Terrassa Museum is a museum entity which encompasses all the municipally owned museums in the city of Terrassa. It belongs to the Museum of the History of Catalonia and the Barcelona Provincial Council Local Museum Network.

The Terrassa Museum has different areas, elements and collections related to the cultural heritage of Terrassa. It comprises the following sections:

== Vallparadís monastery-castle ==
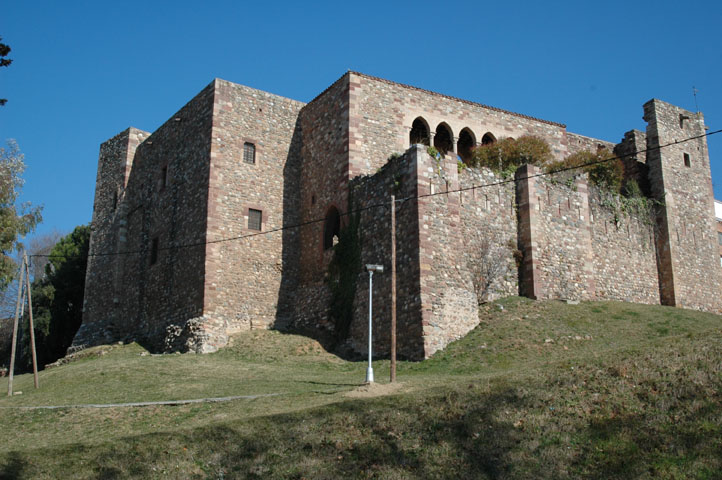
Vallparadís monastery-castle

Vallparadís monastery-castle is the main section of the Terrassa museum. It was originally a defensive structure from the 12th century which was later converted into a monastery in the 14th-15th century. In 1959, it was opened to house the Municipal Art Museum and currently houses a permanent exhibition on the evolution of the territory and human settlement in Terrassa from the first Neolithic inhabitants to contemporary times.

== Churches of Sant Pere ==
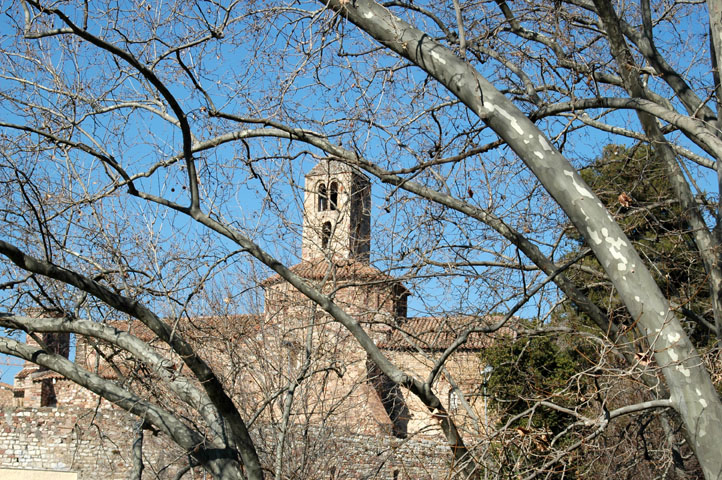
Santa Maria church

The monumental complex of the churches of Sant Pere encompasses the churches of Sant Pere, Santa Maria and Sant Miquel, which formed part of the old Èsgara diocese. In addition to the interesting architecture and archaeological remains on the site, there is also a notable collection of Gothic paintings, with masterpieces by Jaume Huguet, Lluís Borrassà and Jaume Cirera, among others.

== Casa Alegre de Sagrera ==
Casa Alegre de Sagrera was the manor house of Joaquim de Sagrera, a textile manufacturer who worked at the end of the 18th and beginning of the 19th centuries. The house, renovated by Modernisme architect Melcior Viñals, is a model example of an industrial middle-class dwelling of the time.

It houses a series of municipal museum collections, with works of art by Alexandre de Riquer or Joaquim Vancells, among many others, and an Oriental ceramics and porcelain collection. Of additional note are the rooms dedicated to writers Agustí Bartra and Ferran Canyameres and Terrassa artist Mateu Avellaneda.

== Palace tower ==
The palace tower is all that remains of the Terrassa castle-palace. This castle keep, which was a prison until the start of the 19th century, was the only structure left standing when in 1891 the last owner of the castle decided to knock down all that remained of the building.

It was given to the town in 1994 and guided visits are given by appointment only. The original large windows and Gothic portals have been preserved and can be seen at Vallparadís castle.

== Sant Francesc convent ==
The convent of Sant Francesc d'Assís (Saint Francis of Assisi), is a Baroque building dating back to the beginning of the 17th century. Today only the church, cloister and some adjoining areas remain. The cloister is the most emblematic space, with walls covered in polychrome ceramic panels (1671-1673), attributed to the master potter from Barcelona, Llorenç Passoles. The preserved sections of the convent were refurbished recently and today the cloister may be visited.

== See also ==
- Vallparadís Park
