= Clara Noble =

Spanish lady

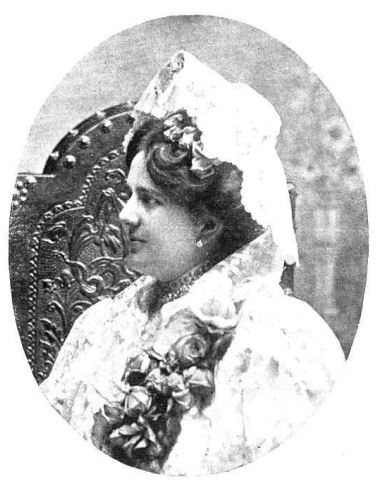
- Clara Noble in 1904
- Born: Clara Noble Malvido; 10 September 1872; Jerez de la Frontera, Spain
- Died: 26 April 1946 (aged 74); Barcelona, Spain
- Occupation: Housewife
- Known for: Wife of the poet Joan Maragall

Clara Noble Malvido (10 September 1872 – 26 April 1946) was a Spanish lady and the wife of the poet Joan Maragall.

== Early life and education ==
According to the baptism certificate, Clara Noble Malvido was born at five in the morning on 10 September 1872, at No. 9 Bizcocheros Street, in Jerez de la Frontera, Andalusia, as the daughter of Ernst Noble Barber, an English insurance broker who was visiting southern Spain on business when he met his future wife, María de las Angustias Malvido Nocedo, an Andalusian lady from Jerez. She was the third of seven children, including her older brother Ubaldo.

Like most daughters of wealthy families of the time, Noble had an important cultural training, typical of the academies for young ladies that existed in the city and which also included "decorative" subjects, such as music (she played the piano) and the French and English languages, both of which she mastered, the latter because of her father.

== Wife of Joan Maragall ==
=== Marriage ===
The Noble Malvido family settled in Catalonia in 1885, but spent their summers in Puigcerdá, where Noble met her future husband Joan Maragall in 1888, when she was 16 years old, while he was close to 28. After three years of courtship, they married on 27 December 1891, in the Santa Anna de Barcelona. The couple settled in a flat on Carrer Roger de Llúria, then Paseo de Gràcia. In 1896 they moved again to Carrer de Consell de Cent, and in 1899 to their final home, very close to where the Noble Malvidos lived, in Carrer d'Alfons XII, n. 79, current headquarters of the Joan Maragall Archive. They had 13 children, six girls and seven boys: Helena (1893), Maria (1894), Eulàlia (1896), twins Clara and Anna (1899) Josep (1900), Joan-Anton (1902), Ernest (1903), Guillem (1905), Raimon (1906), Elvira (1907), Gabriel (1909) and Jordi (1911).

On the same day of their marriage, Maragall, who had been working at Diario de Barcelona for just over a year as editor, received from friends the non-commercial edition of Poesías, a collection of his own work. The correspondence that they maintained was published for the first time in 2011 under the title Letters of courtship and with the edition of the Maragallista Glòria Casals. Soon these and many other later letters preserved in the Archive were published in the Digital Memory of Catalonia. In total, Maragall wrote 51 letters to Noble. The courtship letters between Maragall and Clara are crucial to understanding Maragall's process of entry into adult life (marriage and responsibilities) and recognition as a poet.

=== Personal life ===
Noble faced brief separations from her husband when she went to Cauterets in the summer, her children's illnesses and then marriages, and the administration of her heritage, allowing her to raise all her children and shelter them in their lives. Leading a life without excessive luxury despite her wealth.

Willie Noble Malvido (1874–1895), Clara's sickly brother who died at 21 years old, is the protagonist of a fairly well-known poem by Maragall, En la mort d'un jove (In the death of a young man).

=== Influence in Maragall's legacy ===
Noble was fundamental in her husband's life and work. She tried at all times that family and social burdens did not interfere with Maragall's work as a writer. She was a discreet presence, quite silent, but attentive to everything that was happening around her. After the death of her husband in December 1911, Clara successfully took charge of carrying out the edition of the Obres Completes de Maragall, which was published in 1912 by Gustau Gili, thus tying up his legacy: letters, documents, articles, a whole collection of material that had been kept for many years in the office on the ground floor of the tower and that would be the core of the future Joan Maragall Archive, later deposited in the Library of Catalonia.

This Archive also preserves Noble's documentation, such as a personal diary, letters and photographs, account books, and household invoices; material that shows her personality and the role she played as Joan Maragall's life partner. Noble, her children and her descendants fought to perpetuate the poet's memory.

== Death ==
In her later years, Noble's health became precarious due to hypertension, exacerbated by her husband's anxiety and the Spanish Civil War. Noble died on 26 April 1944, in Carrer Alfons XII, number 79 in Barcelona, in the family house in Sant Gervasi, which is currently the headquarters of the Joan Maragall Archive.
