= Ubaldo Noble =

Spanish footballer

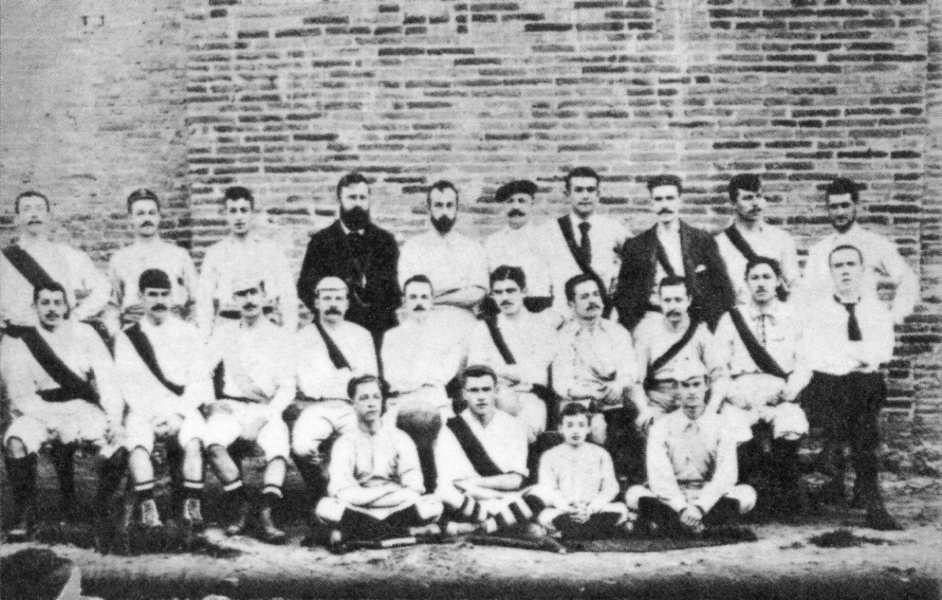
- Noble (seated in the second row, fourth from the left) in 1893

Personal information
- Full name: Ubaldo Noble Malvido
- Date of birth: 1870
- Place of birth: Sarrià, Catalonia, Spain
- Date of death: 1919 (aged 48-49)
- Place of death: Barcelona, Catalonia, Spain
- Position: Forward

Senior career*
Years	Team	Apps	(Gls)
1892–1894	Barcelona Football Club	+1	(0)
- * Club domestic league appearances and goals

Ubaldo Noble Malvido (1870 – 1919) was a Spanish football pioneer who played as a forward for some of the earliest Catalan clubs in existence such as Barcelona Football Club. His younger sister was Clara Noble, the wife of the poet Joan Maragall. His cousins George and Royston Saint Noble, also played football with a Barcelona club, but with the official one.

== Early life ==
Noble was born in Sarrià, Barcelona, in 1870 (Note: Noble would have been born after June 1870 since he does not appear on the June 1870 census in Pennsylvania.) as the son of Ernesto Noble Barber (1841–1920), an English insurance broker who was visiting southern Spain on business when he met his future wife, María de las Angustias Malvido Nocedo (1849–1921), an Andalusian lady from Jerez de la Frontera. He was the second of six children, including the twins Maria Teresa and Maria Luisa, Clara (1872–1944), and Willie (1874–1895).

The Noble Malvido family settled in Catalonia in 1885. Between 1885 and 1896 they lived first in La Rambla, Barcelona, and then in another house on the slopes of Tibidabo, in search of healthy air for a sickly son, Willis, who finally died in 1895 at the age of 21. Since he lived in La Rambla, Noble likely attempted to join the British Club de Barcelona, located on La Rambla dels Capuchins, but that club was a strictly British entity, so even though he had English ancestry, Noble was still rejected, as suggested by the fact that his name never appears in any of the line-ups of the British Club.

His father had an office in Plaça de Catalunya, no. 13, which later became a hotel and even later a warehouse. His uncle George, known as "brother electricity", was one of the main promoters of the installation of electricity in Spain.

== Football career ==
In 1892, Noble joined a group of football enthusiasts led by James Reeves that was promoting the idea of creating a well-organized football club. It remains unclear how they met, but it was most likely Noble who approached him after getting word that Reeves was recruiting members of British Club of La Rambla to play football. Together with Reeves and some other football pioneers in the city, such as George Cochran and the Morris (Jaime and Samuel), they formed the Barcelona Football Club in late 1892.

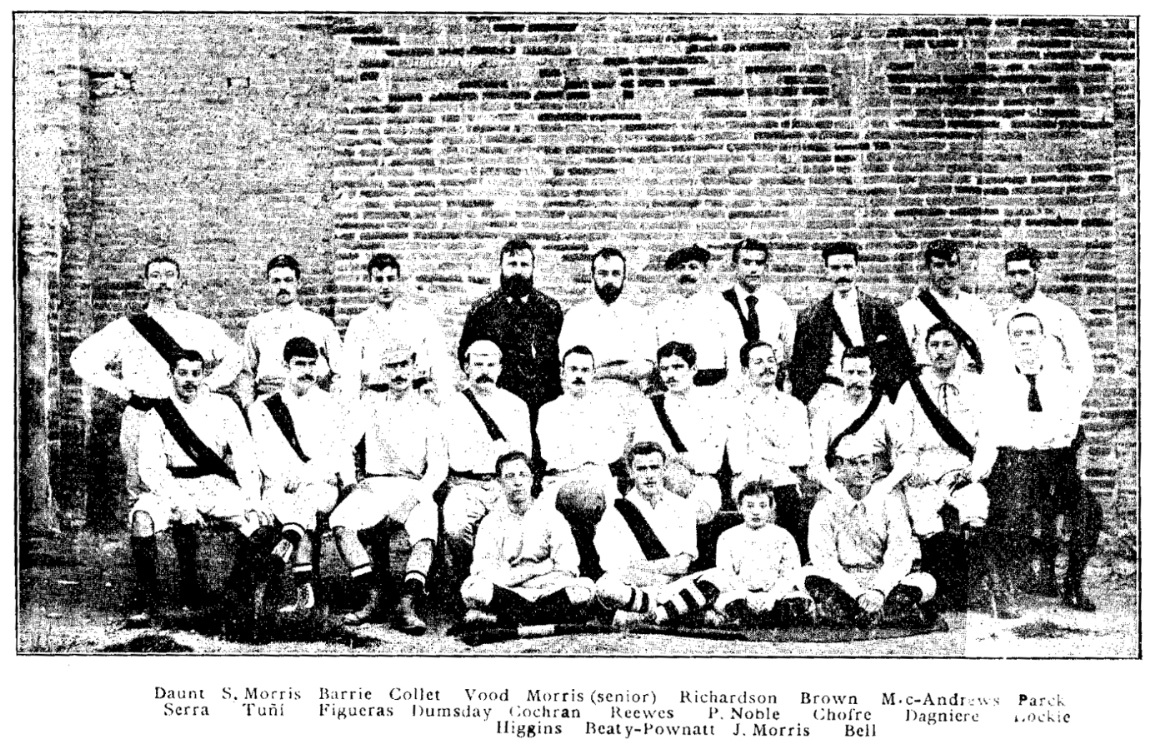
Noble appears in the oldest documented image of a football team in Spain. He can be seen standing in the second row, fourth from the left, between the Reds captain James Reeves and Chofre.

This entity organized the first known football match in the city, which was held at Hippodrome of Can Tunis on 25 December 1892. It remains unclear if he played in this match. However, Noble did play on 12 March 1893, in the historic match between a blue and a red team, starting as a forward for the former in a 1–2 win. Noble appears in what is regarded to be the oldest photograph of a football team in Spain, which depicts these two sides before the match at Can Tunis. The caption of the photogravure of the 22 footballers published by the journalist Joaquim Escardó in 1906 gives him the initial "P", but then his own article refers to him as "O. Noble", so it seems that there was some confusion with the identification of Noble; however, the initials P or O not only do not suit Ubaldo, but also no one else from the Noble family of that time (Willis, George, or Royston).

Noble played several training matches (Blues vs Reds) at Can Tunis, but due to the little statistical rigor that the newspapers had at that time, the exact number of matches and goals (if any) he performed is unknown. His former teammate Jaime Morris and his uncle George were both freemasons and the sons of both, including his cousins George and Royston Saint Noble, went on to play for FC Barcelona in the early 1900s. Notably, the founder of the Blaugrana club Joan Gamper was also the nephew of a freemason, Émile Gaissert, and his son Emilio also played for the club.

== Later life ==
Noble married Elvira Milans Pigrau, and the couple had two sons, Ernest and Angels Noble Milans. Àngels went on to become a painter, marrying Enric Prat de la Riba, son of the former president of the Commonwealth of Catalonia.

A collection of 7 letters of correspondence (1901 to 1907) between Noble and his brother-in-law, the poet Joan Maragall, were published in 2011 and then preserved in the Joan Maragall Archive, later deposited in the Library of Catalonia. He was known as el tio Ubaldo (uncle Ubaldo) by the sons of Maragall. When Maragall wrote his will in 1901, Noble was a member of the Family Council along with Maragall's uncle Rossend and his nephew Josep Lleonart i Maragall.

Noble died in 1919, at the age of either 48 or 49. Both of his parents followed him to the grave shortly after, he in 1920 and she in 1921, so Elvira Milans, the widow of "Uncle Ubaldo", inherited the Noble-Malvido house. In the mid-1920s, "Tia Elvira", as the Maragalls called her, sold the house and sometime later went to Uruguay. In the late 1920s, the building housed the so-called clinic of Doctor Escayola, dedicated to traumatology and surgery, but which in fact also functioned as a care center for terminally ill patients that even had a mortuary for the deceased.
