= Hospital de la Santa Creu =

The name Hospital de la Santa Creu may refer to two different hospital complexes in Barcelona, Spain:

- Old Hospital de la Santa Creu, the city's main hospital, founded in 1401 and operated until 1926,
- Hospital de la Santa Creu i Sant Pau, a modernist hospital complex built between 1901 and 1930 that replaced the medieval hospital as the main healthcare facility of the city hospital until 2009
