= Pablo Gelber =

Argentinian orthopaedic surgeon (born 1974)

Pablo E. Gelber Ghertner (born 21 December 1974) is an Argentine orthopedic surgeon specializing in knee preservation, with a focus on cartilage transplantation and ligament reconstruction. He practices at ReSport Clinic in Barcelona and in London, England.

== Early life and education ==
Gelber was born in Buenos Aires, Argentina. He earned his medical degree from the University of Buenos Aires in 2001 and completed his residency in Orthopaedic Surgery and Traumatology at Parc de Salut Mar (Autonomous University of Barcelona) in 2008. He obtained a PhD from the same university in 2007. In 2010, he completed a research fellowship at the University of Pittsburgh.

== Professional career ==
Since 2009, Gelber has worked at the Hospital de Sant Pau in Barcelona, where he has focused on advanced surgical techniques in multiligament knee injuries, and cartilage transplantation. In 2023, he began practicing in London.

== Awards and recognition ==
Gelber has received several awards from scientific societies in orthopedics, including:

- Best Scientific Study Award – Spanish Arthroscopy Association (AEA), 2021 and 2022
- ESSKA Most Active Member Award, 2020
- Fundación MAPFRE-SECOT Award for Best Spanish Scientific Article, 2008

== Selected publications ==
Gelber has authored numerous peer-reviewed publications, particularly on osteochondral transplantation and complex knee injuries. His most cited works include:

- Early Postoperative CT Scan Provides Prognostic Data on Clinical Outcomes of Fresh Osteochondral Transplantation of the Knee, AJSM, 2022.
- A new CT scoring system to assess osteochondral allograft transplantation for the knee, International Orthopaedics, 2021.
- Ten-year outcomes of polyurethane meniscal scaffold implantation, Arthroscopy, 2023.

He has also co-authored international consensus statements on knee surgery published in leading journals. Gelber has contributed to over 70 scientific articles and book chapters. Selected publications include:

- Surgical techniques for posteromedial corner injuries, in The Medial Collateral Ligament and the Posteromedial Corner, Nova Science, 2018.
- Graft selection and regulation, in Surgery of the Meniscus, Springer-Verlag, 2016.
- Editor, ESSKA Instructional Course Lecture Book, Springer-Verlag, 2016.
- ACL Reconstruction Techniques, in Arthroscopic ACL Reconstruction: A Practical Guide, Springer, 2014.
