= Royal Academy of Medicine of Catalonia =

Academic institution in Barcelona, Spain

- Reial Acadèmia de Medicina de Catalunya
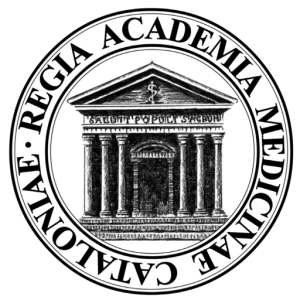
- Formation: 1770; 256 years ago
- Headquarters: Barcelona, Spain
- Official language: Catalan
- Website: www.ramc.cat

The Royal Academy of Medicine of Catalonia (Catalan: Reial Acadèmia de Medicina de Catalunya; Spanish: Real Academia de Medicina de Cataluña) is an academic institution in Catalonia, Spain, founded in Barcelona in 1770 as the Acadèmia Medicopràctica de Barcelona. It received the title of Royal in 1785 and was known as the Royal Academy of Medicine of Barcelona from 1821 until 1991, when it adopted its current name. Its headquarters are located at Carrer del Carme, 47, in Barcelona. The academy's seat, the former College of Surgery building, was declared a Bien de Interés Cultural in 1951.

== History ==
The academy originated in meetings held from 1754 at the house of José Ignacio Santponç, attended by physicians including Pedro Güell and Josep Soriano, amid the intellectual climate of the Enlightenment. It was formally constituted as an academy in 1770 and received the royal title in 1785 through the efforts of Francisco Salvá. Ferdinand VII suppressed it between 1824 and 1828, after which it was reorganized.

== Composition ==
The academy comprises 60 elected numerary members, 15 honorary members, up to 120 national members by election or award, and an unlimited number of foreign corresponding members. Since 1874 it has also admitted health professionals from allied fields, including pharmacists, veterinarians, and biologists, in addition to physicians. It is organized into four sections: basic sciences, diagnostics and therapeutics, medicine, surgery, and social medicine.

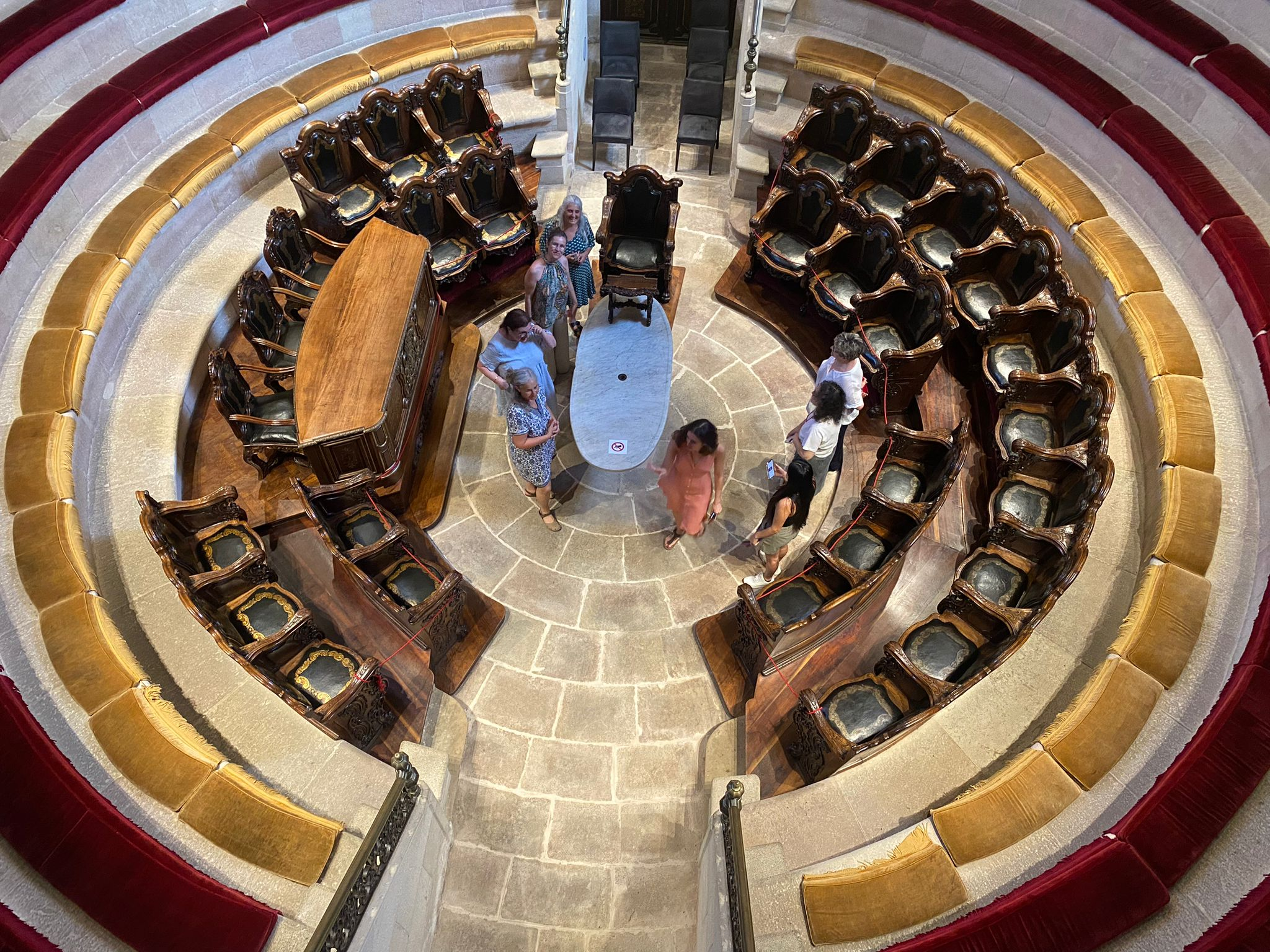
Amphitheatre of the RAMC building

=== Notable members ===
Presidents of the academy have included Francisco Salvá Campillo, Bartolomé Robert Yarzábal, and Augusto Pi Suñer.

Santiago Ramón y Cajal taught histology in the academy's current building, then home to the University of Barcelona's medical faculty, from 1887 to 1892.

== Publications ==
The academy has published the Revista de la Reial Acadèmia de Medicina de Catalunya since 1986, successor to earlier titles including the Memorias de la Real Academia Médico Práctica de Barcelona (1798), El Compilador Médico (1865), Anales de Medicina y Cirugía (1915), and the Boletín Informativo (1964).

== See also ==
- List of Bienes de Interés Cultural in the Province of Barcelona
- Spanish Royal Academy
