= Joan Maragall =

Spanish poet, journalist and translator

Joan Maragall i Gorina
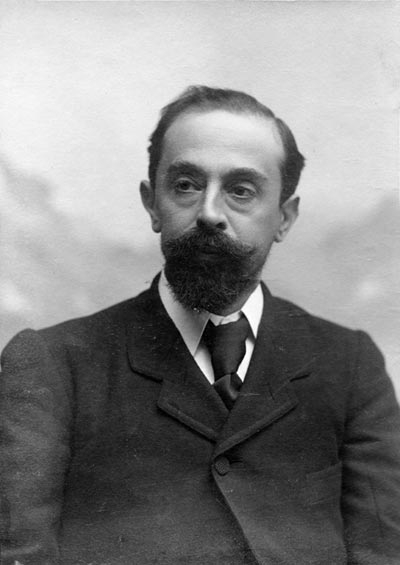
- Maragall, by Pau Audouard, dated 1903.
- Born: 10 October 1860; Barcelona, Catalonia, Spain
- Died: 20 December 1911 (aged 51); Barcelona, Catalonia, Spain
- Occupations: Poet, translator, journalist
- Writing career
- Movement: Modernisme

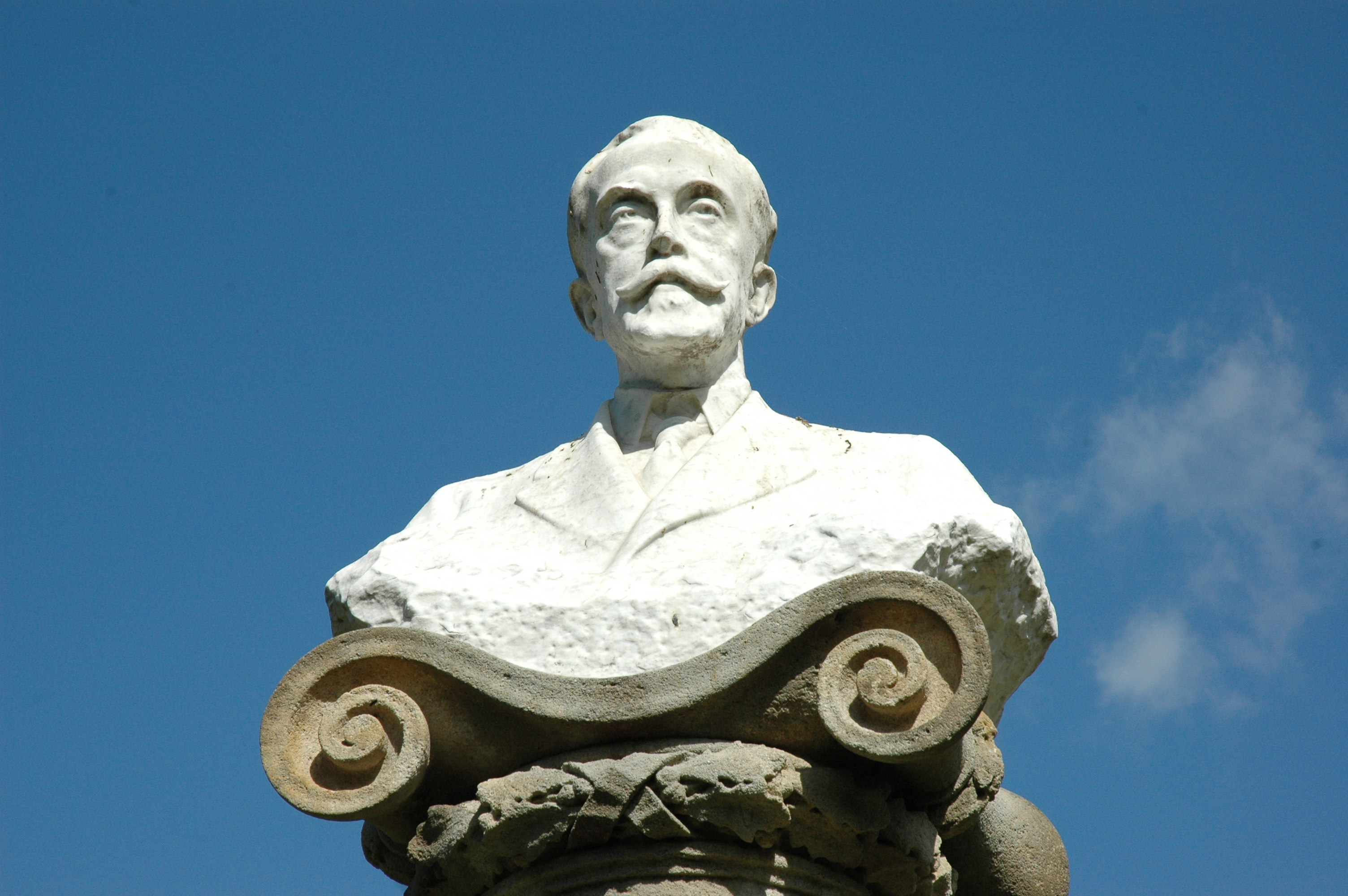
Statue in Barcelona's Parc de la Ciutadella, erected in 1913.

Joan Maragall i Gorina (Catalan pronunciation: [ʒuˈam məɾəˈɣaʎ]; 10 October 1860 – 20 December 1911) was a Spanish-Catalan poet, journalist and translator, the foremost member of the modernisme movement in literature. His manuscripts are preserved in the Joan Maragall Archive of Barcelona.

== Life ==
Maragall's upper-class family was dedicated to the flourishing textile industry in Barcelona, and after finishing school, Joan Maragall took on his father's job. Having never liked his family's trade, he decided to go to university instead, where he studied law to his father's great disappointment.

However, he dropped out of school and married Clara Noble with whom he had 13 children. In 1904 he won all three prizes awarded by the Jocs Florals in Barcelona, and was proclaimed Mestre en Gai Saber. His private home in Sant Gervasi was bought by the Biblioteca de Catalunya and can be visited. He died in 1911 and was buried at the Sant Gervasi Cemetery Barcelona.

His grandson, Pasqual Maragall, would become mayor of Barcelona and then President of Catalonia.

== Work ==
Maragall's poetry was based on themes drawn from human life and nature. Highly influenced by German-language authors such as Nietzsche, Novalis and Goethe, all of whom he translated into Catalan, his poetry went through periods of decadentism and vitalism. He is best known for his 'theory of the living word', or teoria de la paraula viva, which advocated Nietzschean vitalism and spontaneous or even imperfect writing over colder and over-thought poetry.

In addition to his poetry writing, Maragall published journalism in avant-garde magazines of the time—including L'Avenç, Catalònia and Luz—where he became the leading proponent of Catalan modernisme.

Maragall supported Iberian Federalism.

A generous sampling of Maragall's most important poetry and prose is included in the extensively annotated One Day of Life is Life: Joan Maragall.

== Poetic works ==
- Poesies (1895)
- Visions i Cants (1900)
- Les Disperses (1904)
- Enllà (1906), Fastenrath Award 1910.
- Seqüències (1911)
  - includes the poem La fageda d'en Jordà

== Digitized works ==
Digitization is available through the portal El món de Joan Maragall: Col·lecció visual de la vida i l'obra de l'autor or directly at Memòria Digital de Catalunya

== See also ==
- Modernisme
- Catalan literature
- Joan Maragall Archive
