= Monumental church complex of Sant Pere de Terrassa =

Spanish church complex and cultural monument

Coordinates: 41°34′01″N 02°01′07″E

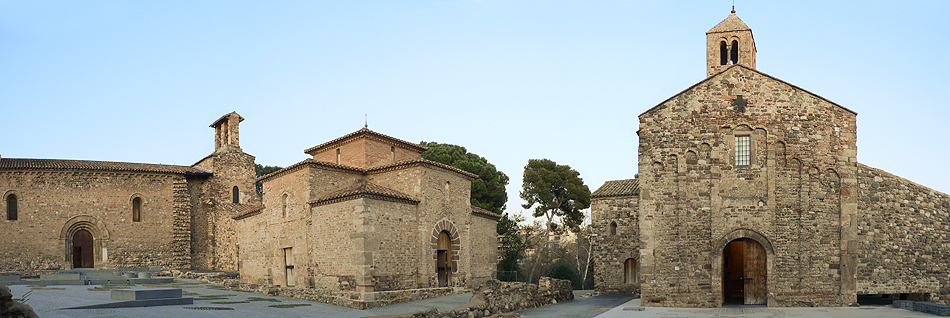
From left to right: the churches of Sant Pere, Sant Miquel and Santa Maria

Monumental church complex of Sant Pere is a Bien de Interés Cultural landmark in Terrassa, Province of Barcelona, Spain. The Romanesque complex of churches includes Sant Pere, Sant Miquel and Santa Maria (translated from the original Catalan into Spanish: San Pedro, San Miguel and Santa María, or in English: Saint Peter's, Saint Michael's and Saint Mary's churches). They are situated at the confluence of Vallparadís and Monner (now Parc de Vallparadís), the most important artistic area of the city, which is noted for Catalan Romanesque art. It was the site of the former Diocese of Egara, an old Visigoth nucleus, in the 5th-8th centuries.

== History ==
The three churches were built near the old Roman Ègara (whose remains are still preserved), which was the seat of the Bishop of Égara around the year 450 and lasted until the Saracen invasion in the 8th century. The episcopal group adhered to the ancient Byzantine model of three churches: Sant Pere, Santa Maria and Sant Miquel. After a long construction process, the current churches, of Romanesque design, were completed in present form during the 11th and 12th centuries during the Visigoth era. In the 12th century, Santa Maria served as an Augustinian canonry until 1392. The church of Sant Pere de Égara, home of the parish, lost its parish status in 1601 and became part of the new bishopric of Terrassa, currently the Terrassa Cathedral. In the 19th century, Sant Pere regained its status as parish church.

Architects, archaeologists and historians, including Francisco de Paula Villar, Lluís Muncunill i Parellada, Josep Puig i Cadafalch, Josep de Calassanç Serra i Ràfols, and Jordi Ambròs continued research on the monuments at different times during the 20th century, in order to discover the episcopal history and that of the Roman Ègara. The work was highlighted by Puig, who made a thorough study of all historical restorations and excavations in Santa Maria and San Miguel. Puig also dealt with the reconstruction of the complex by adding a pool surrounded by eight central columns. Pere Antoni Ventalló i Vintró analyzed the constructive elements within San Miguel before the interventions by Puig. The site was declared a Bé Cultural d'Interès Nacional (BCIN) (national monument) by the Generalitat de Catalunya (Catalan Government) in 1931, and a Bien de Interés Cultural landmark by Spain in 1985. The set of churches forms one part of the six sections of Terrassa Museum.

== See also ==
- List of Bienes de Interés Cultural in the Province of Barcelona
- Early medieval domes

== Bibliography ==
- CARDÚS, S. (1964) La ciutat i la Seu Episcopal d’Egara. Terrassa: Patronat de la Fundació Soler i Palet.
- CASTELLANO, A.; IMMA V. (1993) Les restauracions de les esglésies de Sant Pere de Terrassa. Monografies 3, Barcelona.
- FERRAN, D. (2009) Ecclesiae Egarenses. Les esglésies de Sant Pere de Terrassa. Barcelona: Lunwerg.
- GARCIA, M.G.; MORO, A.; TUSET, F. (2009), La Seu Episcopal d’Ègara. Arqueologia d’un conjunt cristià del segle IV al segle IX. Serie Documenta 8. Tarragona: Institut Català d’Arqueologia Clàssica. 2009.
- GARCÍA, G.; MACIAS, J. M.; MORO, A., (2017), "La iglesia funeraria de época visigoda de Sant Miquel de Terrassa. Análisis arquitectónico". Roldán, L.; Macias, J. M.; Pizzo, A., Rodríguez, O. (eds.). Modelos constructivos y urbanísticos de la arquitectura de Hispania, Documenta 29. Tarrgona: ICAC, pp. 183–198.
- FERRAN, D.; GARCIA, M.G.; MORO, A.; TUSET, F. (2019), “La seu episcopal d’Ègara. Arquitectura, litúrgia i art”, Actes del 4t Congrés Internacional d’arqueologia i món antic. El cristianisme en l’Antiguitat Tardana. Noves perspectives, Tarragona, pp. 215–224.
- MANCHO, C. (2012), La peinture murale de haut Moyen Âge en Catalogne (IX-X siècle). Turnhout: Brepols, pp. 343–394.
- MARTÍ I BONET, J. M. (2007), El Bisbat d´Égara. Breu Història. Barcelona.
- PUIG I CADAFALCH, J. (1889), “Notes arquitectòniques sobre les esglésies de Sant Pere de Terrassa”. Memòria que obtingué el Premi de l’Associació Catalanista d’Excursions Científiques en los Jochs Florals de Barcelona. Barcelona. PUIG I CADAFALCH, J. (1923), “La catedral visigòtica d’Egara”. Anuari de l’Institut d’Estudis Catalans 1915-1920, VI, pp. 747–752.
- PUIG I CADAFALCH, J. (1936), “Les pintures del segle VI de la catedral d’Egara (Terrassa)”. Anuari de l’Institut d’Estudis Catalans 1927-1931, VIII, pp. 141–149.
- SÁNCHEZ, C. (2018), “An Anglo-Norman at Terrassa? Augustinian Canons and Thomas Becket at the end of the twelfth century”. Romanesque Patrons and Processes Design and Instrumentality in the Art and Architecture of Romanesque Europe. Edited By Jordi Camps, Manuel Castiñeiras, John McNeill, Richard Plant. Routledge, Taylor & Francis Group, 2018, pp. 219–234.
- SÁNCHEZ, C (2019), “El retaule mural de Sant Pere i la memòria de l'Èxode”. Terme, 34, pp. 69–90.
- SÁNCHEZ, C. (2019), “Singing to Emmanuel: The Wall Paintings of Sant Miquel in Terrassa and the 6th Century Artistic Reception of Byzantium in the Western Mediterranean”. Arts 2019, 8, 128.
- SÁNCHEZ, C. (2020), “Arte, música y liturgia en Sant Miquel de Terrassa”. Respondámosle a concierto : estudios en homenaje a Maricarmen Gómez Muntané". E. Carrero y S. Zauner (eds.), Universitat Autònoma de Barcelona. Departament d'Art i Musicologia, Institut d'Estudis Medievals, Bellaterra, 2020, pp. 249–262.
- SÁNCHEZ, Carles (2021), A painted tragedy. The martyrdom of Thomas Becket in Santa Maria de Terrassa and the diffusion of its cult in the Iberian Peninsula, Anem Editors, La Seu d'Urgell., 978-84-122385-7-0
- SÁNCHEZ, Carles & SOLER, Joan (2021), "The Anglo-Catalan Connection: The Cult of Thomas Becket at Terrassa-New Approaches", Arts 10: 82.
- SÁNCHEZ, Carles (2021), "Las pinturas de San Miguel y Santa María de Terrassa ¿Ecos de un repertorio oriental tardoantiguo?", C. Varela, M.Castiñeiras (ed.), Images and Liturgy in the Middle Ages. Creation, Circulation, and Function of Images between West and East in the Middle Ages (5th-15th centuries), pp. 361–397.

== links ==
- Media related to Conjunt monumental de les esglésies de Sant Pere de Terrassa at Wikimedia Commons
- https://www.seudegara.cat/
- https://www.terrassa.cat/seu-egara
