= Llista d'encapçalaments de matèria en català =

The Llista d'encapçalaments de matèria en català (LEMAC) is a Catalan language controlled vocabulary that includes subject headings – linguistic expression (a term or a phrase)- used by cataloguers to represent the thematic content of documents – a concept, event, name, or title- and that allows users to make a search in a catalogue, bibliography or index. LEMAC is created and maintained by the Servei de Normalització Bibliogràfica of the National Library of Catalonia (Biblioteca de Catalunya), and it is applied by librarians to the documents being catalogued, so that users can search items through access points other than authors, titles or publishers. Subject headings also allow users to retrieve headings together when the topic is the same and, at the same time, they show the topics covered in a given collection.

LEMAC was developed following the spirit of the Llei 4/1993 del Sistema Bibliotecari de Catalunya (Catalan Library System Law) in order to "gather in a same union catalogue the bibliographic references integrating the different library resources of the Sistema Bibliotecari de Catalunya".

== History and evolution ==
The Llista d’encapçalaments de matèria en català is the result of the translation of the Lista de encabezamientos de materia para bibliotecas by Carmen Rovira and Jorge Aguayo, and of the adaptation of the Library of Congress Subject Headings (LCSH). LEMAC was initially created by the Institut Català de Bibliografia in 1983 and continued later by the National Library of Catalonia. The Lista de encabezamientos de materia para bibliotecas is the Hispanoamerican adaptation of LCSH and was of common use in Spain when the Catalan Government decided to translate it to Catalan language at the late eighties.

There are other subject headings lists that are also used or searched to create the LEMAC authority records, such as the Répertoire de vedettes-matière of the Université de Laval (Laval RVM), which is the Canadian accepted rule by the National Library of Canada and, above all, the Répertoire d’autorité matière encyclopédique et alphabétique unifié (RAMEAU), inspired on the Canadian version, which is the official subject headings authority list in France.

In December 1999, the Llista d’encapçalaments de matèria en català (LEMAC) was codified to machine readable format. In April 2002, it was made available online through the National Library of Catalonia website. LEMAC subject authority records may be viewed in thesaurus format or in MARC21 code.

== Update newsletter ==
Thanks to the benefits of the new Millennium computer system, starting in January 2009, the LEMAC Updates Bulletin is published, with monthly periodicity, with which it is intended to discover a demand that, until now, couldn't have been satisfied due to lack of staff.

This new monthly bulletin will include the new headings incorporated in LEMAC during the previous month and the modified headings, also the previous month, that is to say that the headings records of which have experienced a change of the type that is listed below:

- Headings replaced by a different one. (In this case, the register contains a 4XX with the subfield lwnnela).
- Headings authority records of which some modification in the relationship system has been offered. That is, a relation of generic term, related term, used for (or see reference) or see also has been added or deleted.
- Headings records of which some modification in the scope note has been offered.
- Record headings of which a geographical subdivision has been added that was not previously listed.
- The new subdivisions or the subdivisions modified the previous month, which will be ordered alphabetically with the new or modified headings.

There will not be included in this bulletin:

- The records to which only the 670 source field has been added with the equivalences in English and French: LCSH and RAMEAU, etc.
- The records to which only the field 681 of the note of thematic examples has been added.
- Those that only present a modification of the codings of the header and field 008, other than the indication of the geographical subdivision.

You can check the updates by external access to the catalog of the Library of Catalonia. Whoever wishes may request information from Contact. This last method of access is recommended to users who wish to check the updates on a periodicity less than the monthly.

== Maintenance and update ==
The unceasing introduction of new subject headings and the continuous need to revise and update the headings translated from the Hispanoamerican list – when they are used for the first time- in order to adapt them to LCSH, and the constant changes of the relationship's system among authorised headings (they also must be adapted to the current policies of Library of Congress) is the reason why the LEMAC is like an organism which grows and changes permanently. The database content is updated monthly or every two months.

In January 2009, the Bibliographic Standardization Service of the National Library of Catalonia began to publish the Butlletí d’actualitzacions de la LEMAC, updated also monthly or every two months. This bulletin contains the list of the new subject headings added o modified until the date of publication.

Though the economic means to the LEMAC ‘s creation and maintenance are infinitely much lower than those of the Library of Congress, the LEMAC tries to take advantage of the American investment in order to build a Catalan encyclopaedic subject heading list which tries to cover the needs of the Catalan library system and to include terms that reflect our cultural bias.

== Other authority catalogs ==
- Catàleg d'autoritats de noms i títols de Catalunya (CANTIC)
- Library of Congress Authorities
- RAMEAU
- Catálogo de autoridades de la Biblioteca Nacional d’Espanya
- Catálogo CSIC Autoridades
