= Chapel of Santa Àgata =

- Capella de Santa Àgata (Catalan)
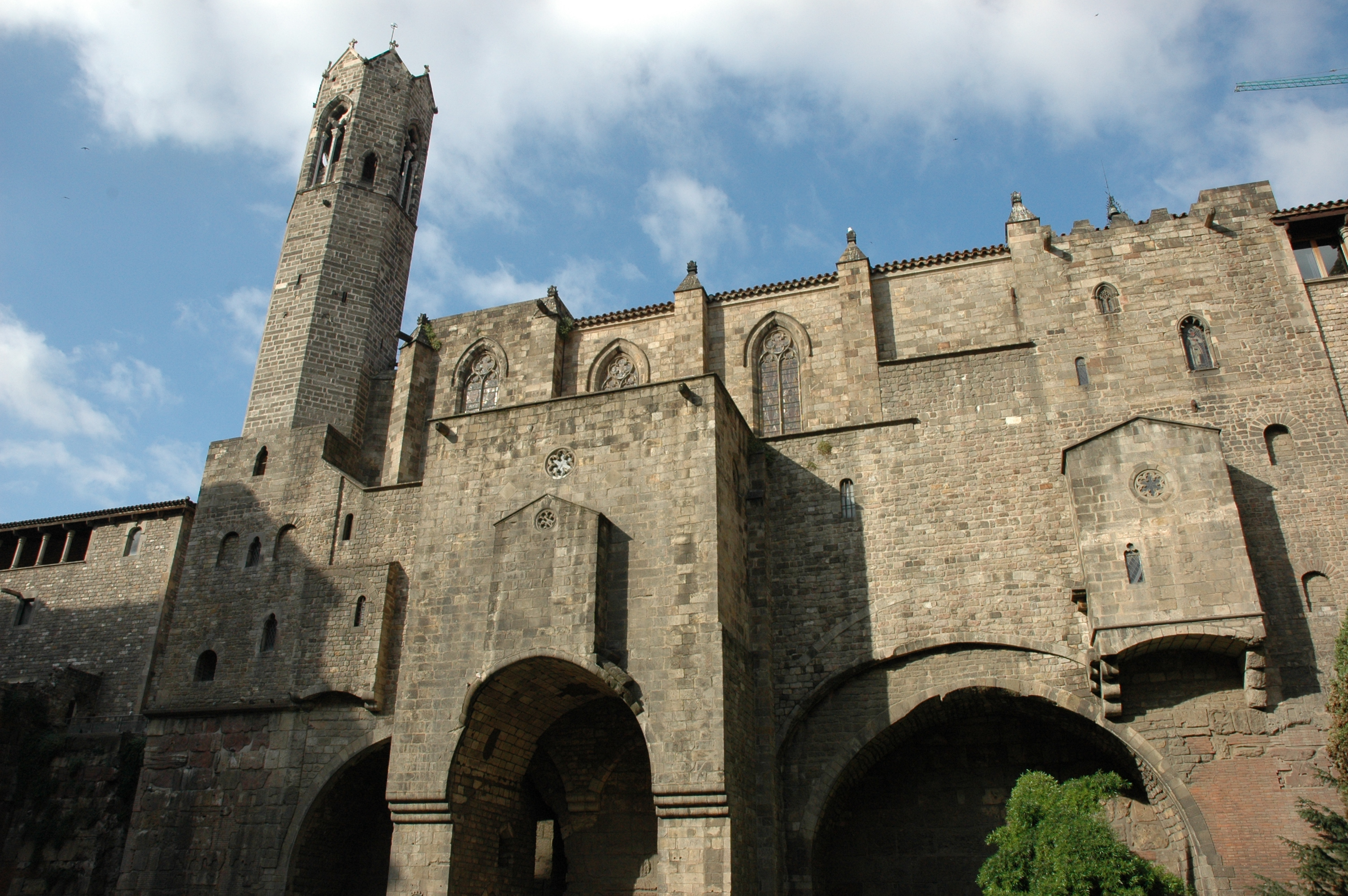

- Location within Catalonia
- 41.384306°N 2.177361°E
- Location: Barcelona, Catalonia, Spain

Spanish Cultural Heritage
- Official name: Capilla de Santa Ágata
- Type: Non-movable
- Criteria: Monument
- Designated: 1866
- Reference no.: RI-51-0000005

The Chapel of Santa Àgata (Catalan: Capella de Santa Àgata, Spanish: Capilla de Santa Ágata) is a chapel located in Barcelona, Catalonia, Spain. It is also as the Royal Chapel. It was declared Bien de Interés Cultural in 1866.

== History ==
Chapel of Santa Ágata was built in 1302. One was the later additions to this Chapel is an outstanding altarpiece by Jaume Huguet in the fifteenth century. This Chapel includes the group of buildings of Reial Major Palace. The Chapel's construction followed an order by James II and the reigning Queen Blanca d'Anjou.

== Art ==
The sculptor Joan Claperós, under the mandate of Peter, Constable of Portugal (1463-1466) designed sixty earth floor tiles painted with representations of angels and the arms of Aragon and Sicily. Along with this, the king ordered for the magnificent altarpiece of Epiphany that presides over the chapel by the artist Jaume Huguet.

== See also ==
- List of Bien de Interés Cultural in the Province of Barcelona
