= Hospital de Sant Pau =

Former hospital complex in Barcelona, Spain

Hospital de la Santa Creu i Sant Pau
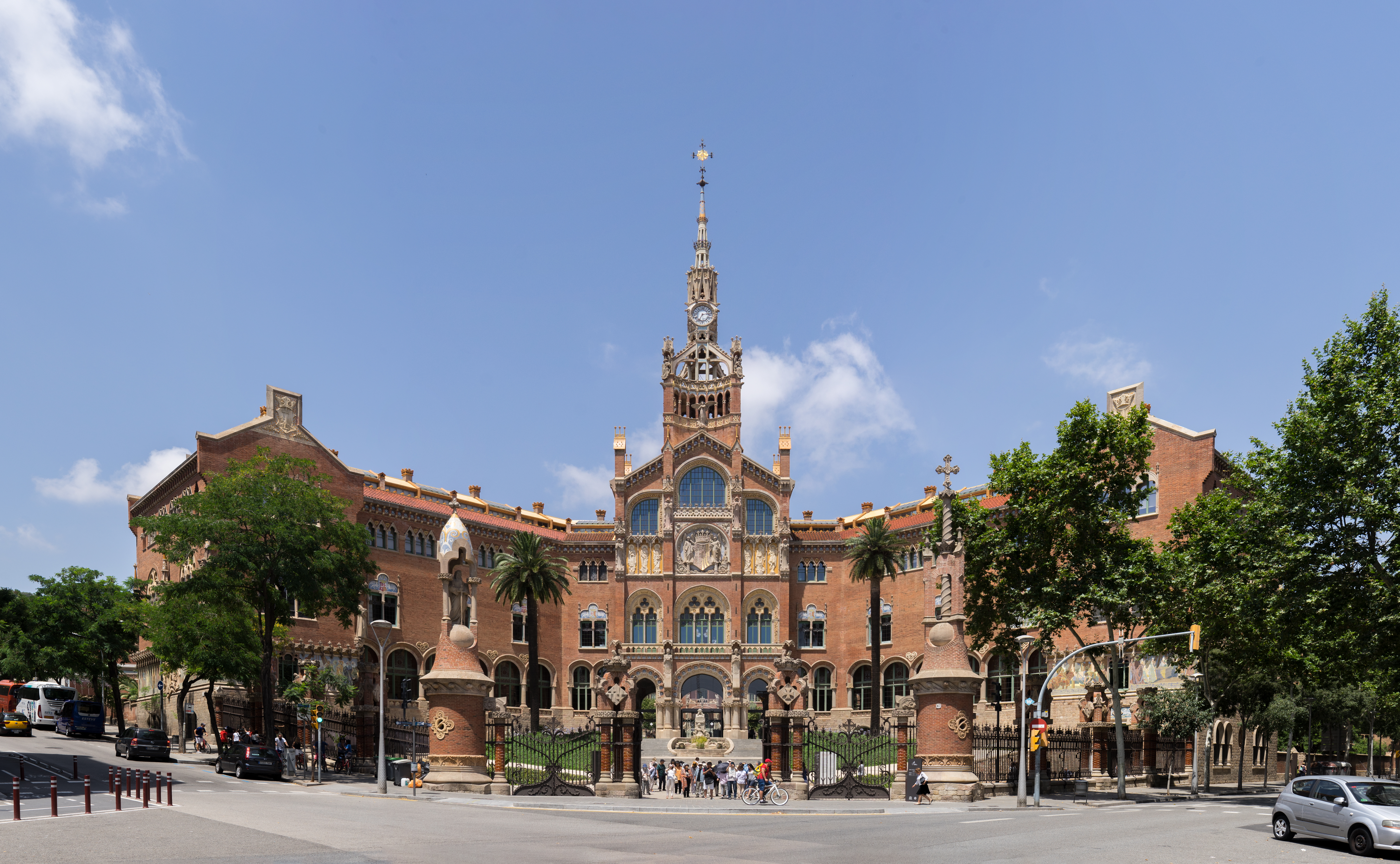
- Interactive map of the Hospital de la Santa Creu i Sant Pau area

General information
- Architectural style: Modernisme
- Location: Barcelona, Spain
- Coordinates: 41°24′46″N 2°10′28″E
- Construction started: 1401
- Completed: 1450

Website
- www.santpau.cat/en/

UNESCO World Heritage Site
- Criteria: Cultural: (i), (ii), (iv)
- Designated: 1997 (21st session)
- Part of: Palau de la Música Catalana and Hospital de Sant Pau, Barcelona
- Reference no.: 804bis-002
- Region: Europe and North America
- Area: 6.74 hectares (16.7 acres)
- Buffer zone: 23.14 hectares (57.2 acres)

Spanish Cultural Heritage
- Type: Non-movable
- Criteria: Monument
- Designated: 19 May 1978
- Reference no.: RI-51-0004278

The former Hospital de la Santa Creu i Sant Pau (Catalan pronunciation: [uspiˈtal də lə ˈsantə ˈkɾɛw i ˈsam ˈpaw], English: Hospital of the Holy Cross and Saint Paul) in the neighborhood of El Guinardó, Barcelona, Catalonia, Spain, is a complex built between 1901 and 1930. It is one of the most prominent works of the Catalan modernisme architect Lluís Domènech i Montaner. The complex was listed as a Conjunto Histórico in 1978. Together with Palau de la Música Catalana, it was declared a UNESCO World Heritage Site in 1997.

Composed of 12 pavilions connected through long underground galleries within its large green space, Sant Pau is the largest complex built in Art Nouveau style. It was a fully functioning hospital until June 2009, when the new hospital opened next to it. It underwent restoration for use as a museum and cultural center, and re-opened in 2014. An important historical and architectural masterpiece, the building also offers workspace to high-profile social organizations such as the WHO, Banco Farmacéutico, Barcelona Health Hub, EMEA, UN-HABITAT and more. The cultural center also has a historical archive where records and documents of remarkable occurrences related to the hospital and the city can be found. The archives are open to visitors and offer information to users and researchers with an information and reprographics service, in addition to a reading room.

== History ==
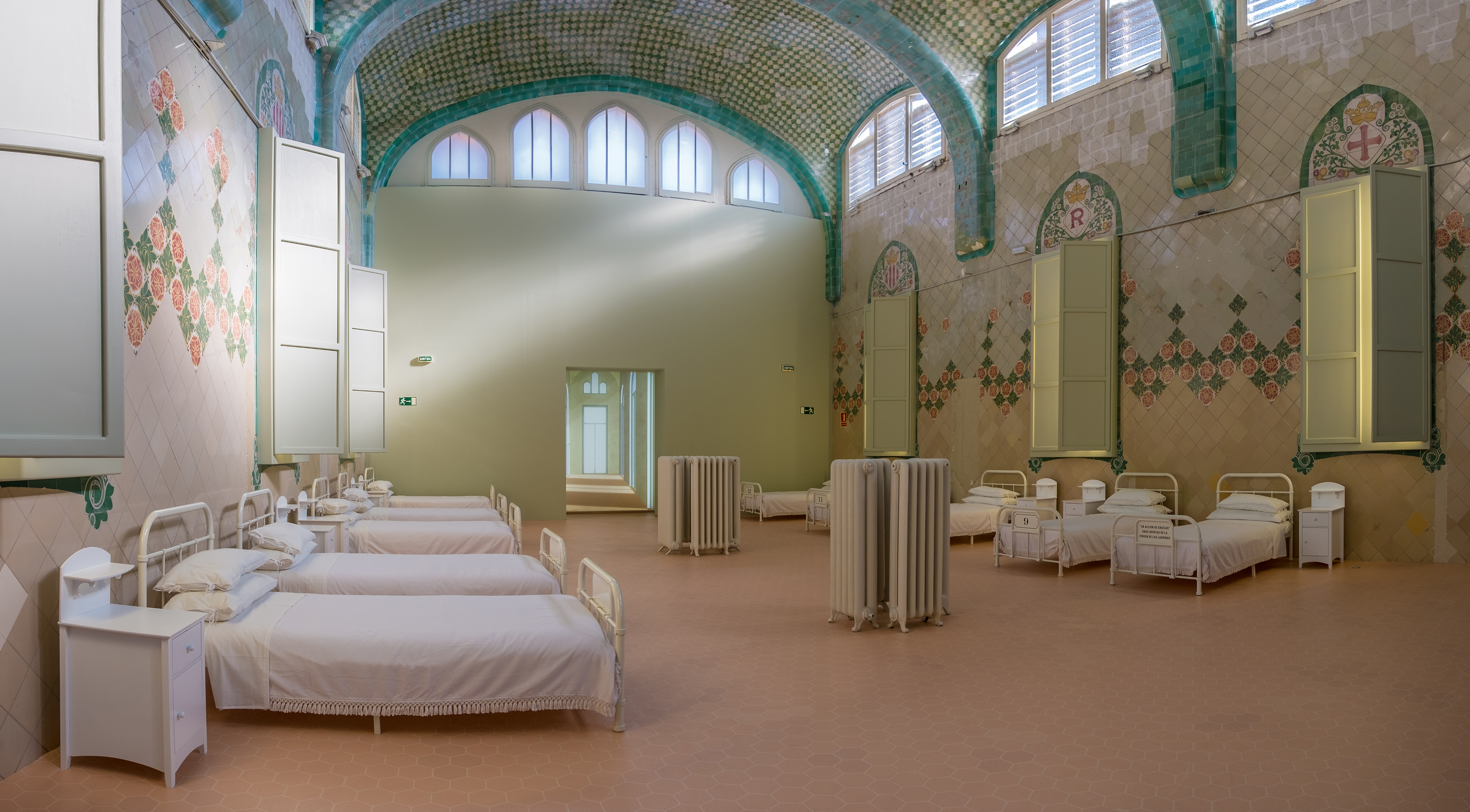
Interior of the hospital

Although the hospital's current 26 buildings date from the 20th century, the Hospital de la Santa Creu (the last part of its name, "Sant Pau", was added in honour of the banker, Pau Gil, who paid for the new buildings in the 20th century) was founded in 1401 when six small medieval hospitals merged. The hospital's former buildings near the center of Barcelona date from the 15th century, and now house an art school (Escola Massana) and the Biblioteca de Catalunya (National Library of Catalonia).

The initial building's construction started in 1401 and was completed in 1450. Later, in the 17th century, the Casa Convalescència building was added to the complex. With the expansion of the city and weariness of the medieval buildings, the construction of a new hospital designed by Lluís Domènech i Montaner began in 1902. Domènech's original plan had 48 buildings, 27 of which were actually constructed.

In 1991, the hospital was awarded the St. George's Cross by the Generalitat de Catalunya.

In 2003, a new hospital building was erected to the north of Domènech i Montaner's Modernista pavilions, where almost all departments moved. However, a few departments such as the Blood and Tissue Bank, the radiography department and the physical therapy department remain in some of the old buildings.

== Restoration ==
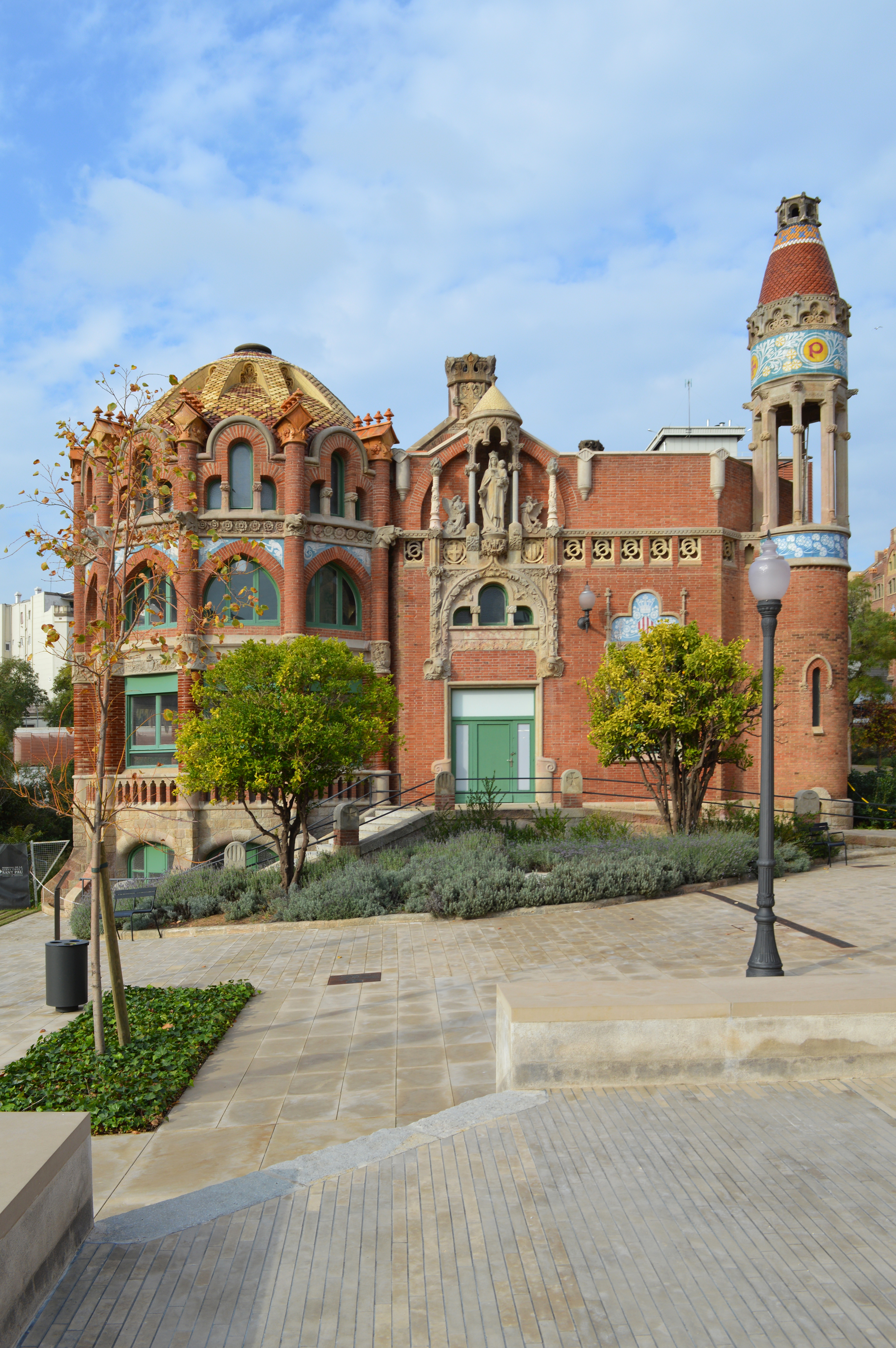
Pavelló de Nostra Senyora del Carme, in 2015

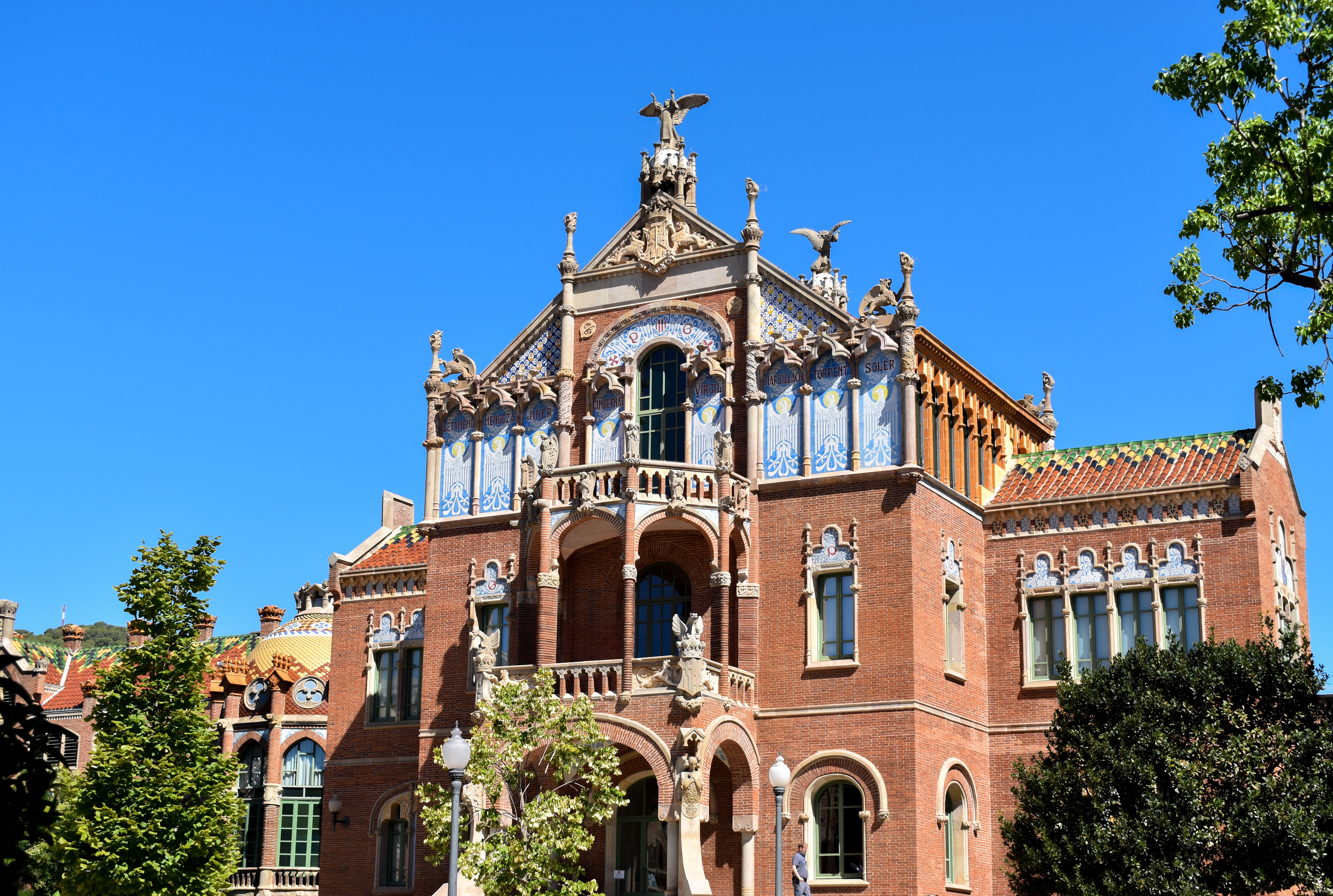
Pavelló d'Operacions in 2023

A meticulous restoration of the complex began in 2009. A Heritage Committee coordinated the process and ensured the quality of the interventions. Over 30 teams of experts and architects took part in the restoration. The original configuration of the buildings was brought forth through examining historical archives prior to the interventions.

A built area of 29,517 square metres (317,720 sq ft) and an outdoor space of 31,052 square metres (334,240 sq ft) were included in the restoration. Funded by the European Regional Development Fund, Generalitat de Catalunya, the Spanish Government, IDAE, Barcelona City Council, Barcelona Provincial Council, CEB and the private foundation Hospital de la Sant Creu i Sant Pau, the project had a total budget of €100 million.

The restoration project had three main objectives.

- restore the building to its original state by strengthening the structure and removing any elements added in the later stages of its lifetime.
- emphasize the ornamental elements with materials suitable to the original design of the buildings.
- adapt the complex for contemporary needs and possible alternative uses without relinquishing its authenticity.

The objectives in relation to the restoration of the buildings were carried out in three steps. First, the original structure and plan was recovered by eliminating the structures that were not in the original plan. Afterward, the infrastructure and support structures such as iron beams and framing were strengthened. New underground rooms and a new perimeter of columns was built to contribute to the functionality of the building without disrupting its façade.

Even though the premises have been open to visitors since 2014, the restoration project was expected to be fully completed in 2020.

== See also ==
- List of Modernista buildings in Barcelona
- Art Nouveau
