= Old Hospital de la Santa Creu, Barcelona =

Building complex in Barcelona, Spain

- Antic Hospital de la Santa Creu
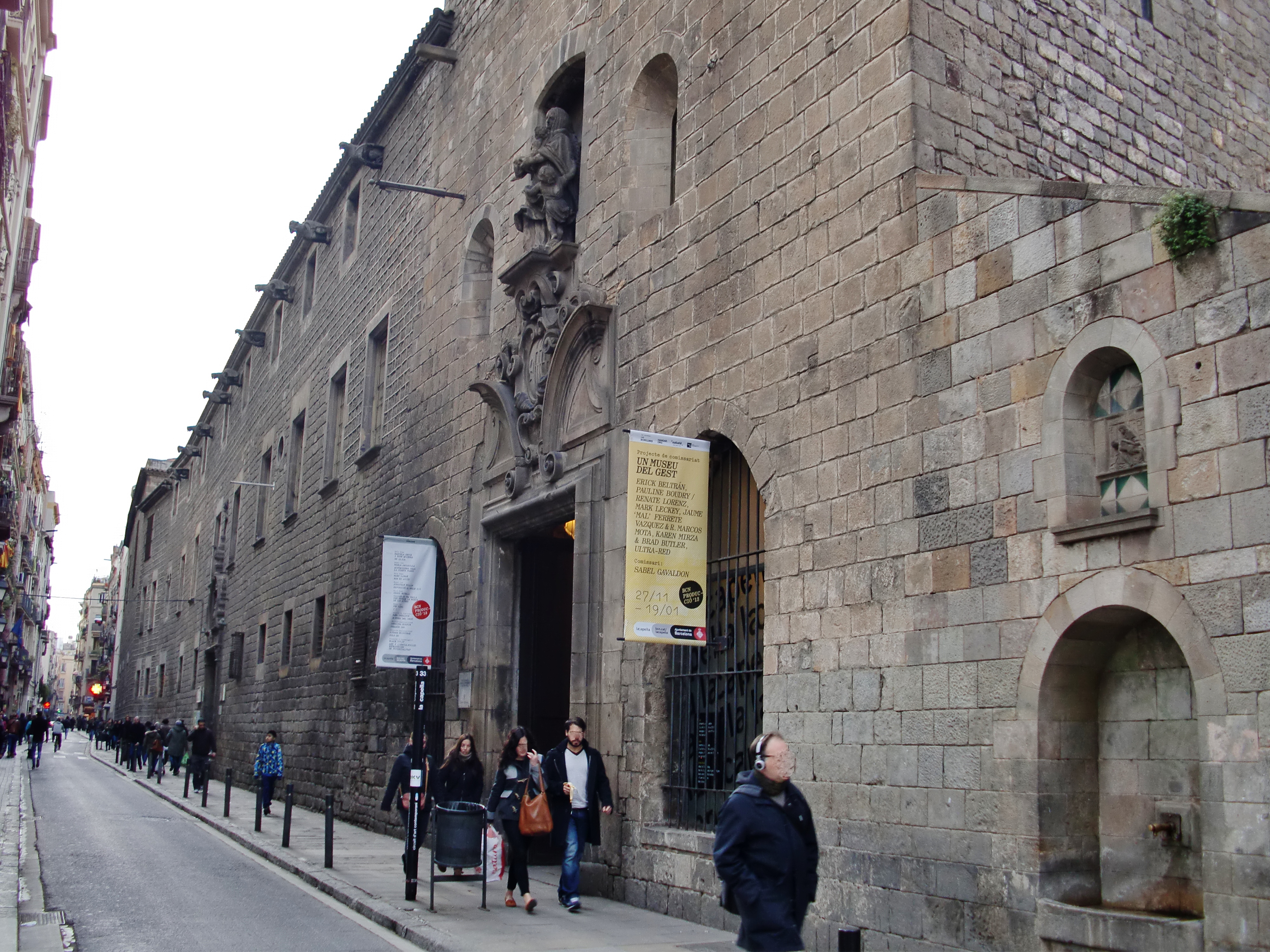
- Entrance to the old hospital
- Interactive map of the Old Hospital de la Santa Creu, Barcelona area

General information
- Location: Barcelona, Catalonia, Spain
- Coordinates: 41.3811°N 2.17°E
- Groundbreaking: 1401
- Relocated: 1926

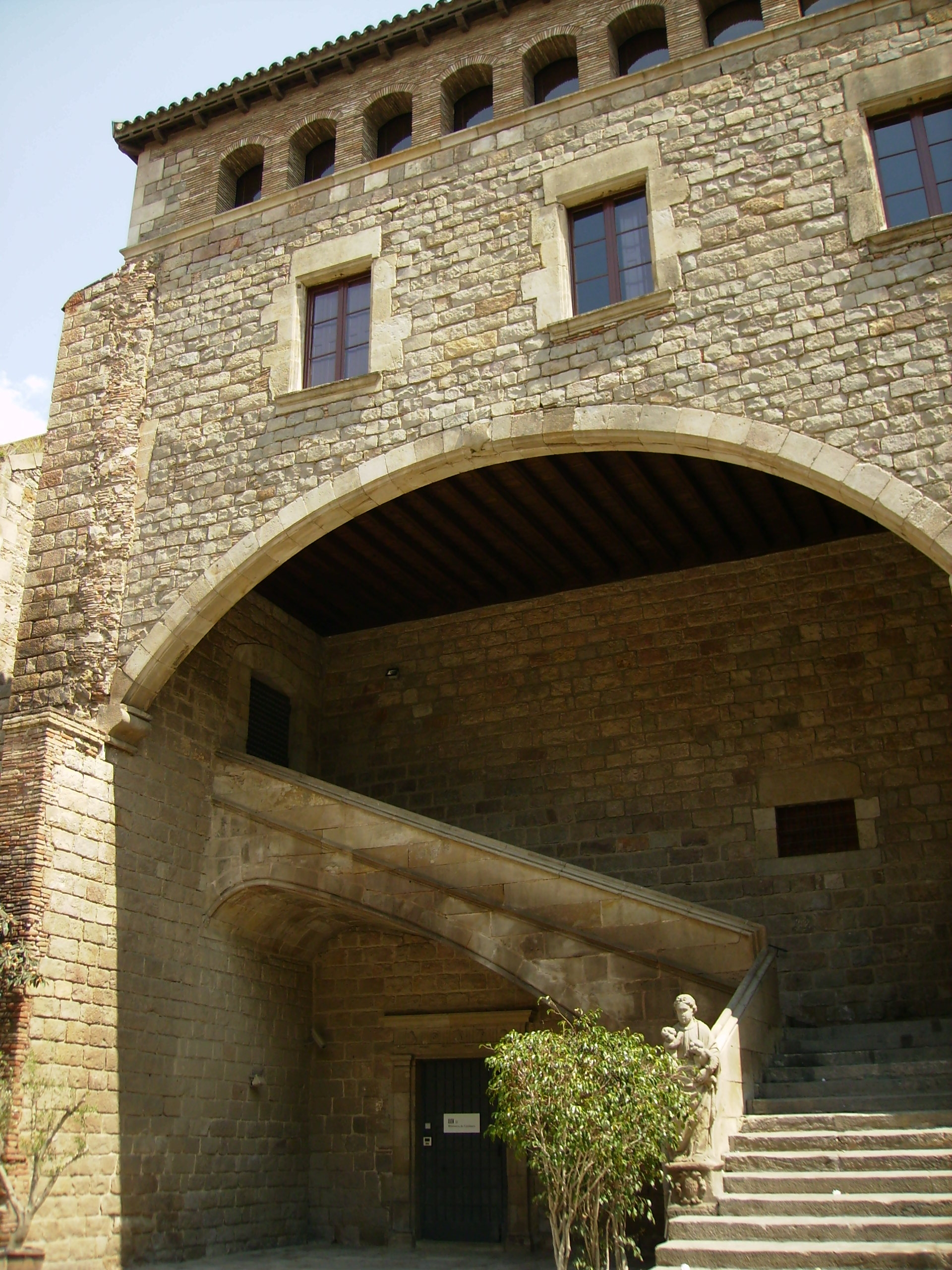
The monumental staircase

The Old Hospital de la Santa Creu is a 15th-to-18th-century building complex in Barcelona, which formerly served as a hospital and hospice and currently is the home of the National Library of Catalonia (Biblioteca de Catalunya), the Institute for Catalan Studies, the former College of Surgeons, municipal libraries, and several other cultural institutions. It has been declared a Historic and Artistic Landmark of National Interest.

== History ==
In 1401 the Council of One Hundred (Consell de Cent), the then-government of Barcelona, decided to build the Hospital de la Santa Creu, merging and centralizing six hospitals in the city. The complex, designed by Guillem d'Abiell, was planned on a grand scale in the form of four two-story wings surrounding a central patio. Next the east wing (1406), north wing (1406-1509) and the west wing (1509) were built. In spite of the elapsed time they all have the same layout: ground floor covered with curved vaults that are very low with brick plates and upper floor with a double-sloped wooden beam on lightly pointed diaphragm arches. In front of the three wings the galleries of the cloister were arranged, with rib vault (begun in 1406 by Guillem d'Abriell).

During the 16th and early 17th centuries, one of the four wings was demolished, two more wings were added and another court was built adjacent to the first, and this still retains the monumental stairs that now give access to the Biblioteca de Catalunya.

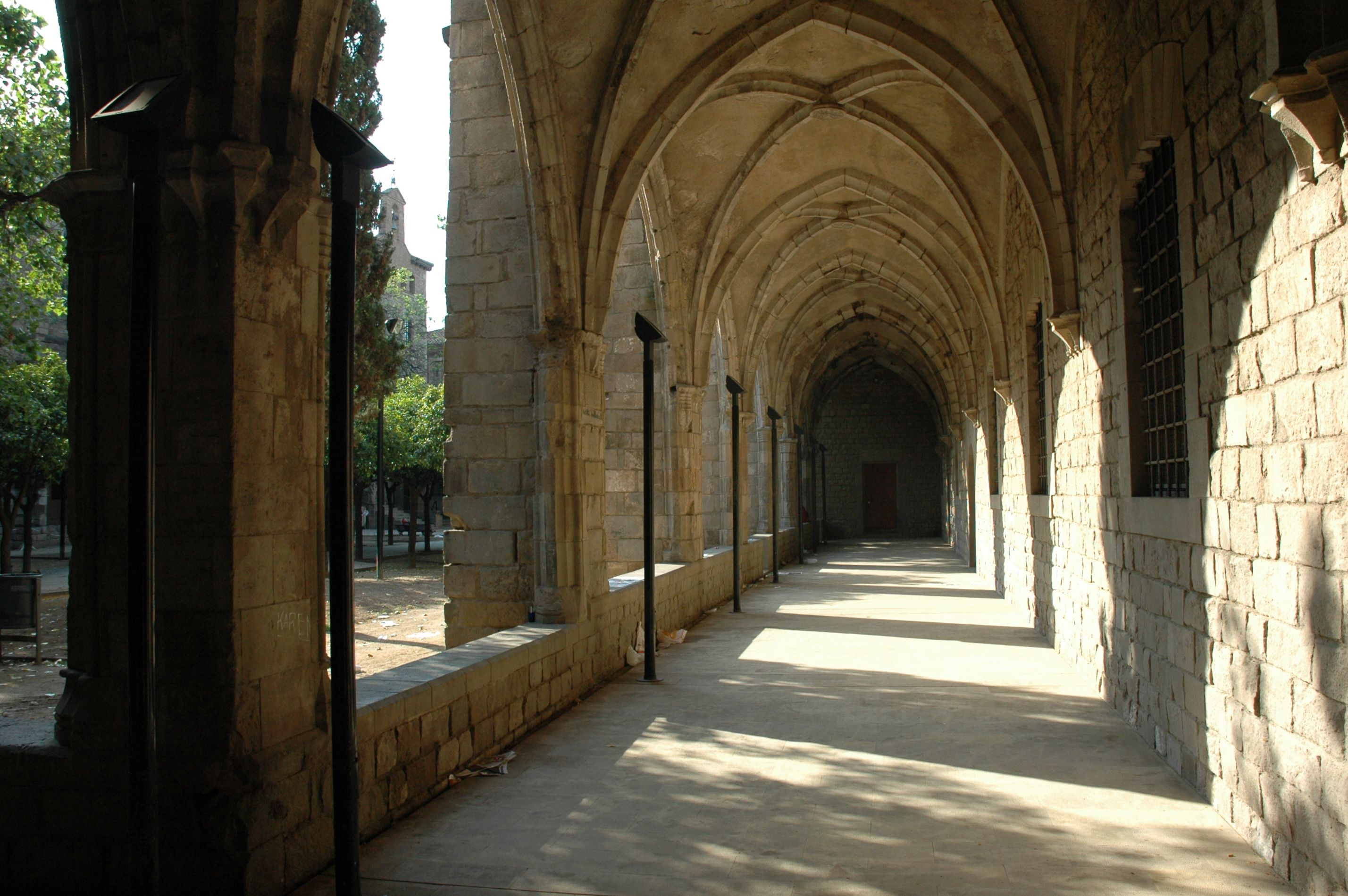
Cloister gallery

In 1703, Antoni Viladomat, one of the most significant Catalan painters of the Baroque period, painted the chapel of Saint Paul.

In 1763, in front of the Casa de Convalescència, the College of Surgeons (later Medical Faculty and now Royal Academy of Medicine of Catalonia) was built, by Ventura Rodríguez.

By the end of the 19th century, the hospital had become outdated because of the growth of the city and advances that had been made in medicine and hygiene, so it was moved to a new site at the Hospital de Sant Pau, built between 1902 and 1930.

A month before the hospital was closed down in 1926, Antoni Gaudí died here, three days after he was hit by a tram.

In 1926 the building was purchased by the City Council, who began restoring it. It now houses the Biblioteca de Catalunya (since 1939), the Institut d'Estudis Catalans (since 1931), the Escola Massana art school (since 1935) and two public libraries run by the Diputació de Barcelona. On June 3, 1931 it was declared a Monument of National Historic and Artistic Interest.

== Architecture ==
The oldest part of the Hospital de la Santa Creu is an impressive example of Catalan civil-Gothic architecture. The interior boasts several large vaulted halls. Also of note is the cross vaulted Galeria del pati, which borders the inner garden, and the arched entrance to the library at the patio, built in the sixteenth century.

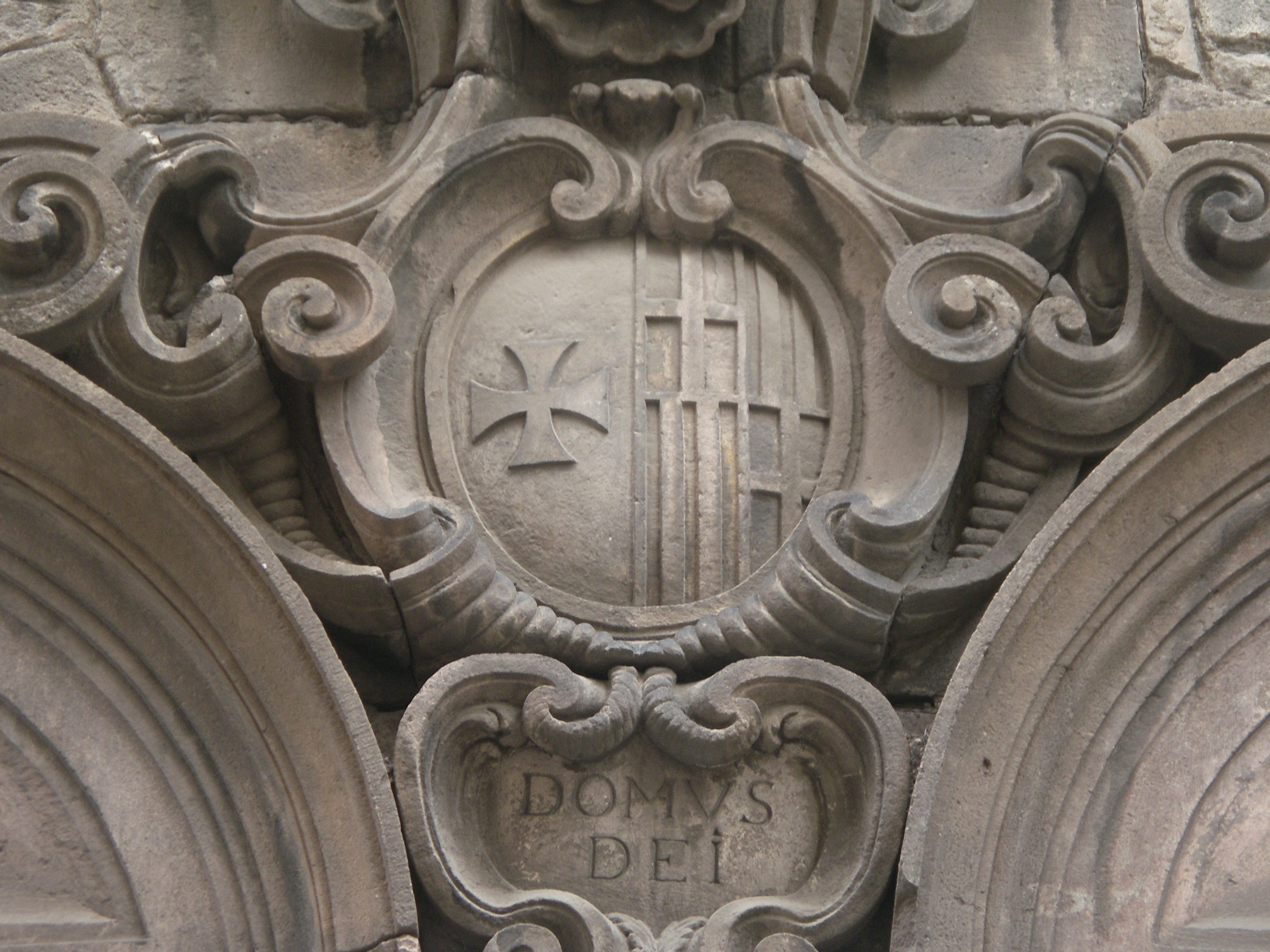
The arms of the hospital, on the chapel wall, carved by Pere Costa

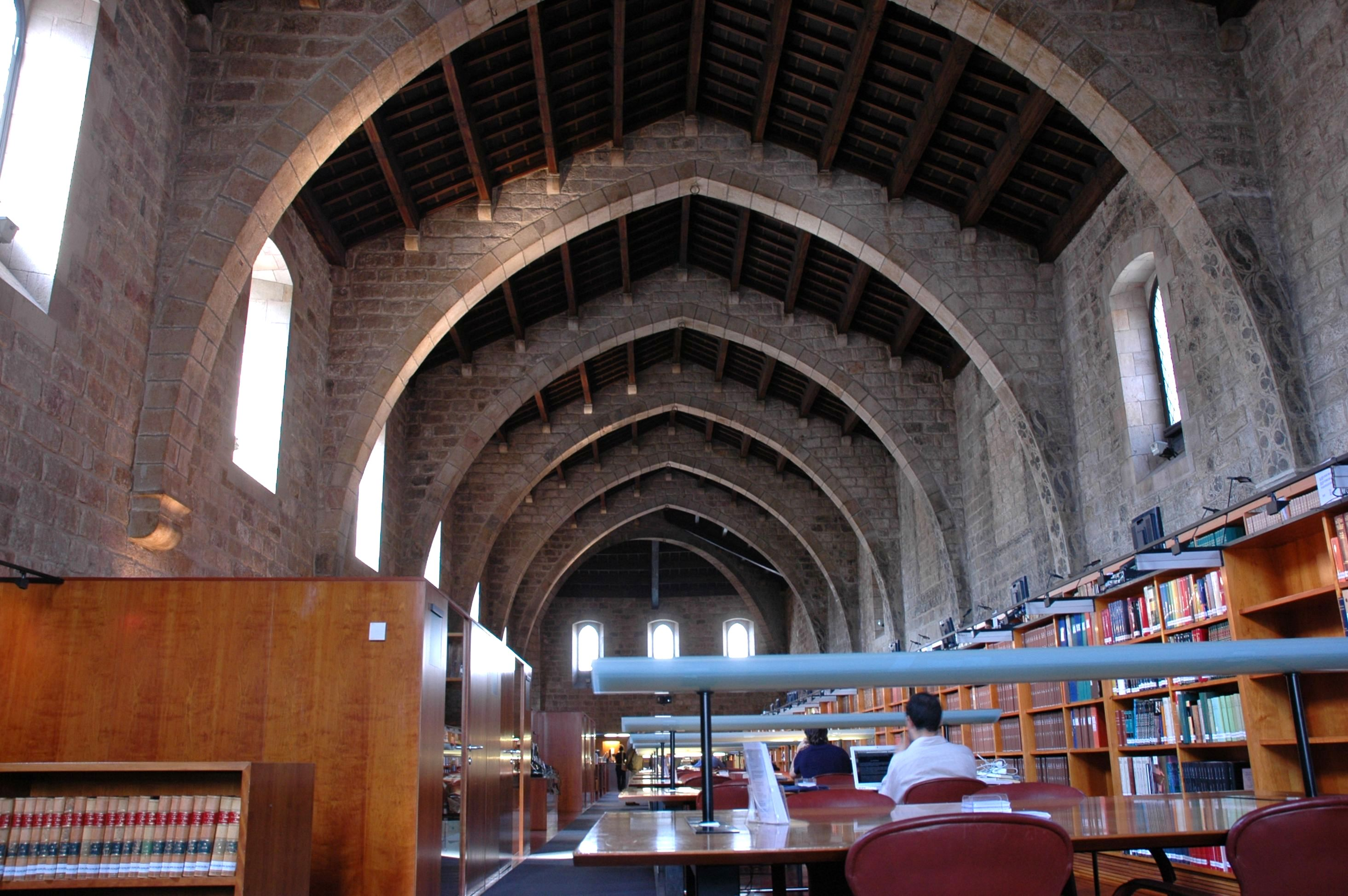
Northern wing of the Hospital (1406-1509)

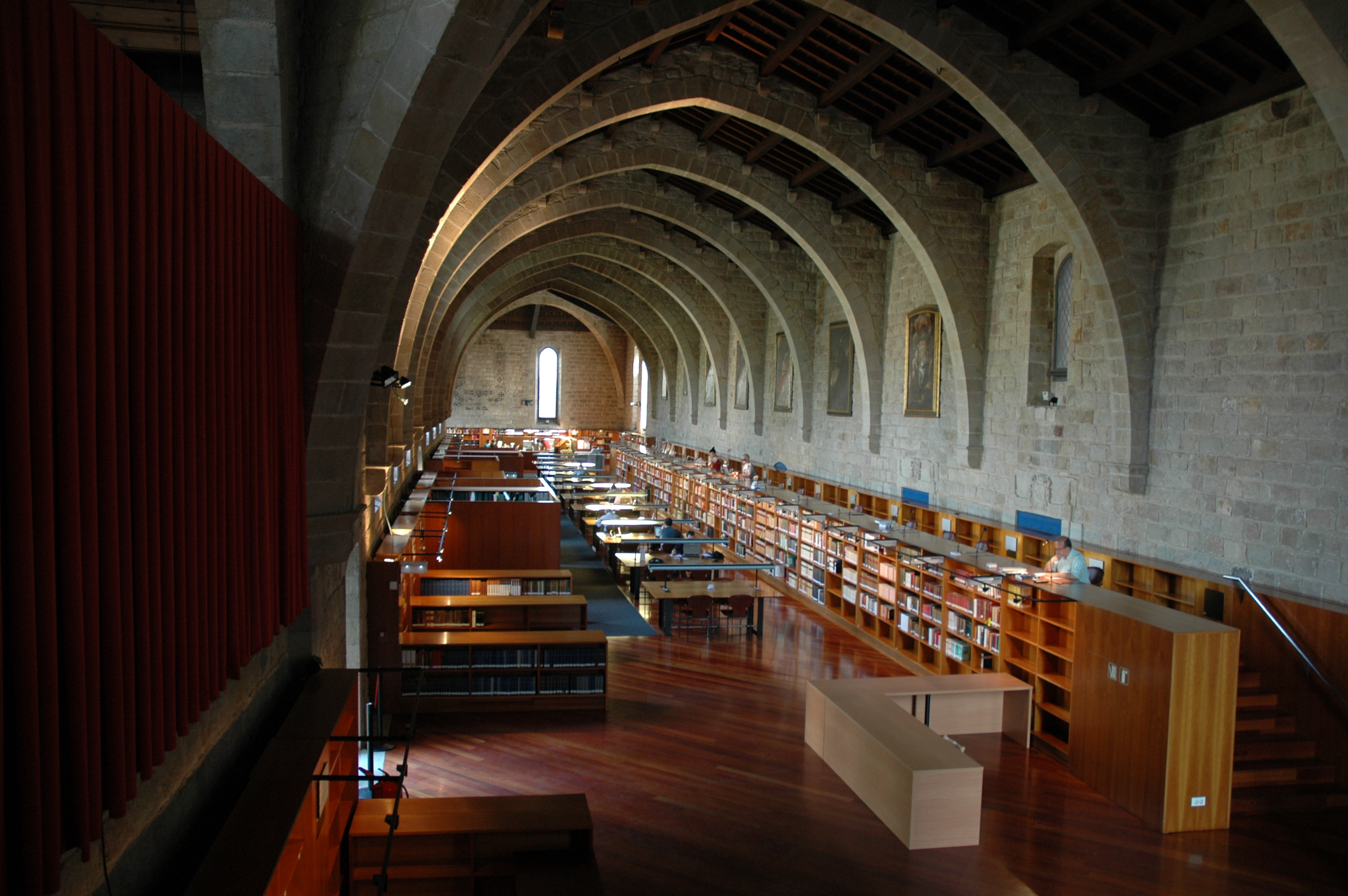
Eastern hall

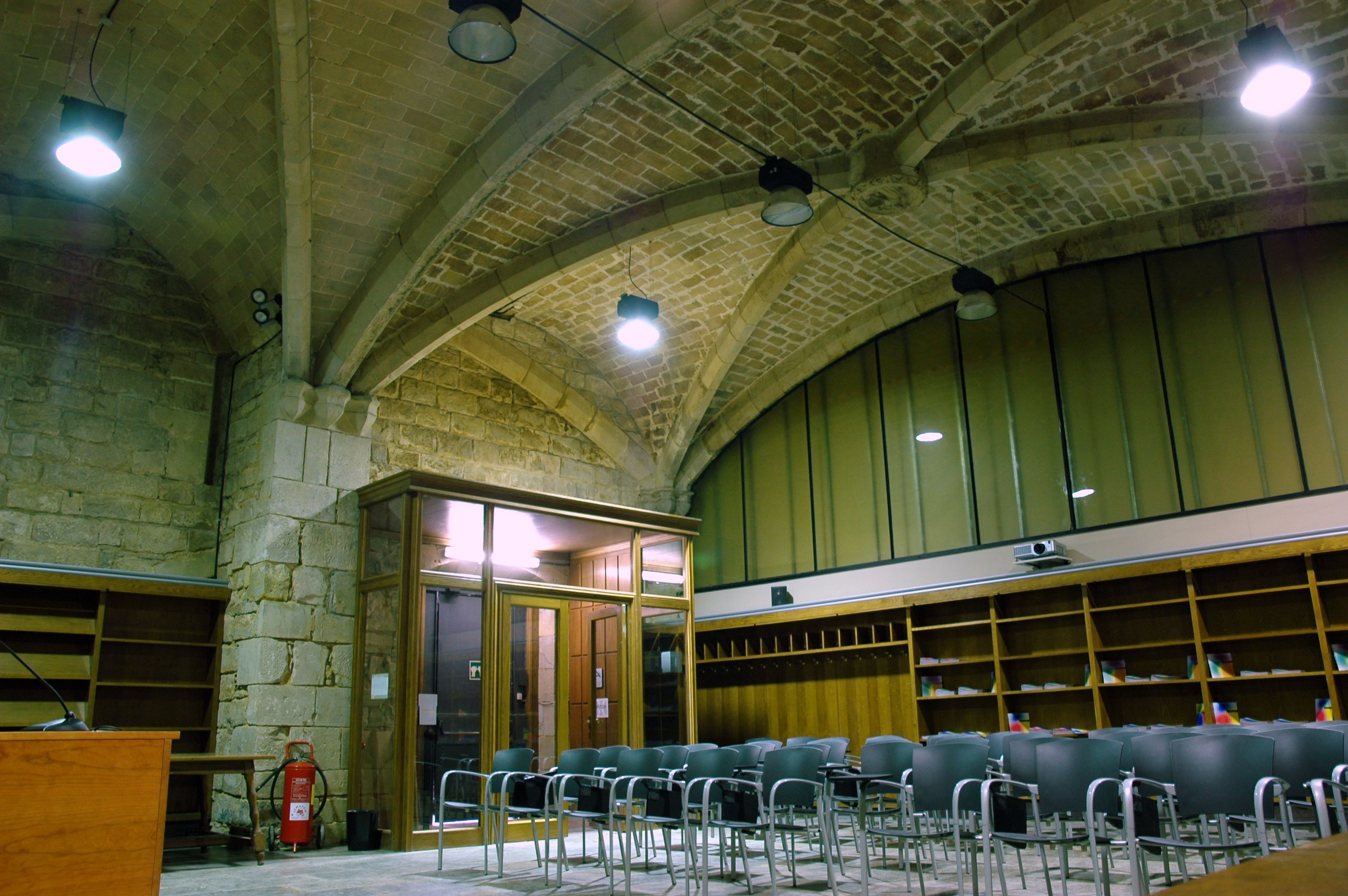
Ground-floor Gothic chamber (15th century)

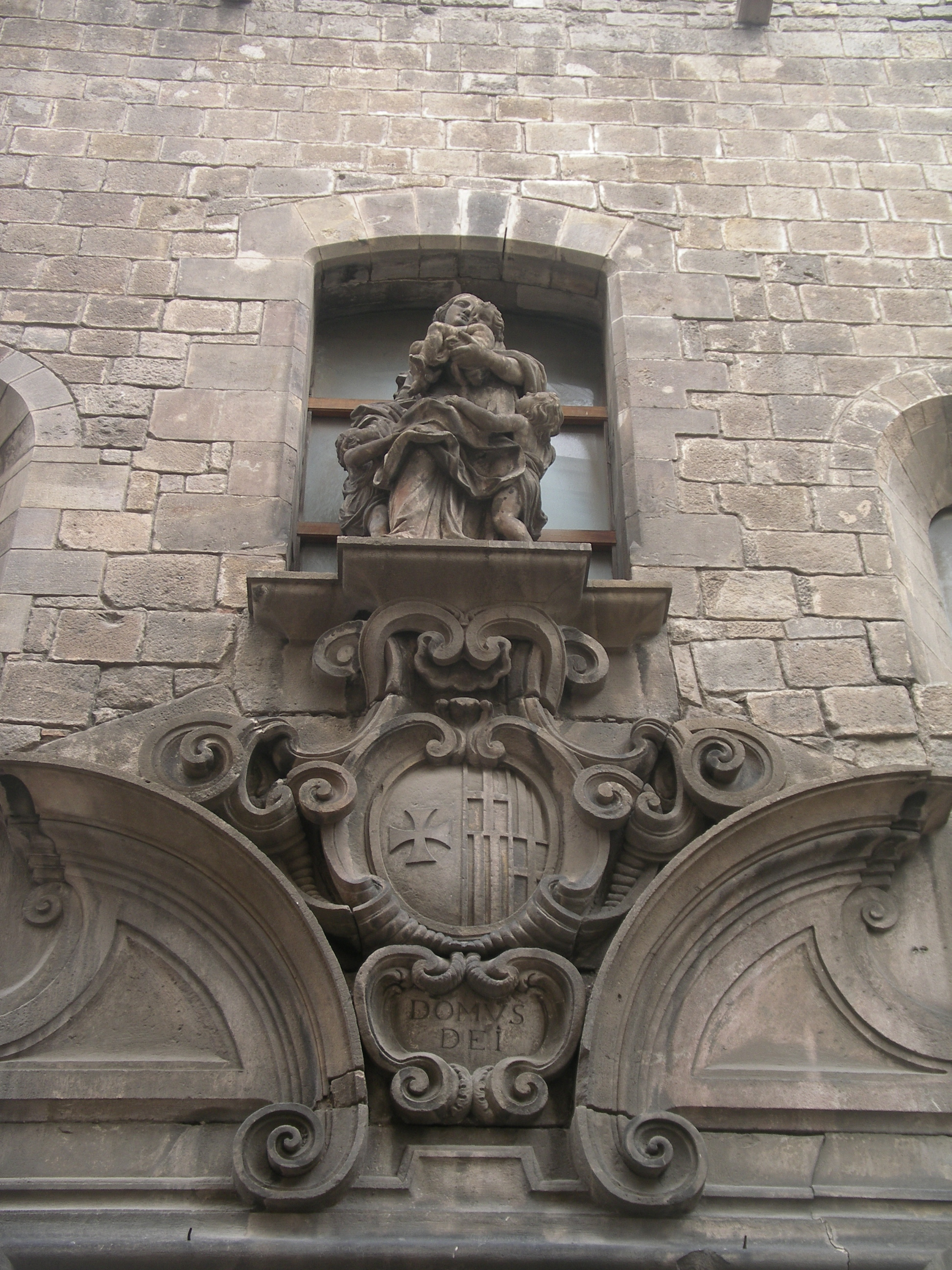
The chapel (17th century)

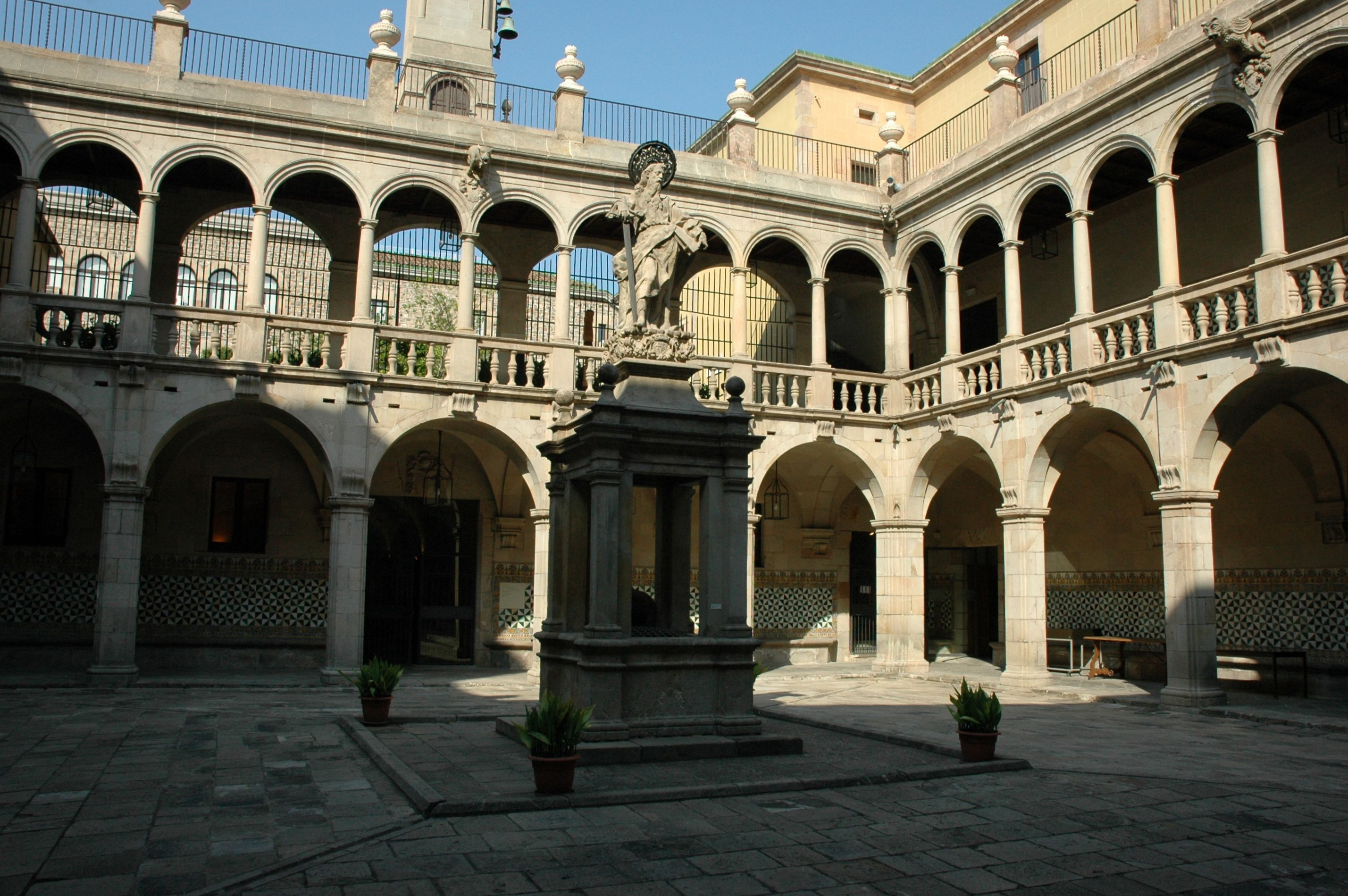
Courtyard of the Casa de Convalescència (17th century)

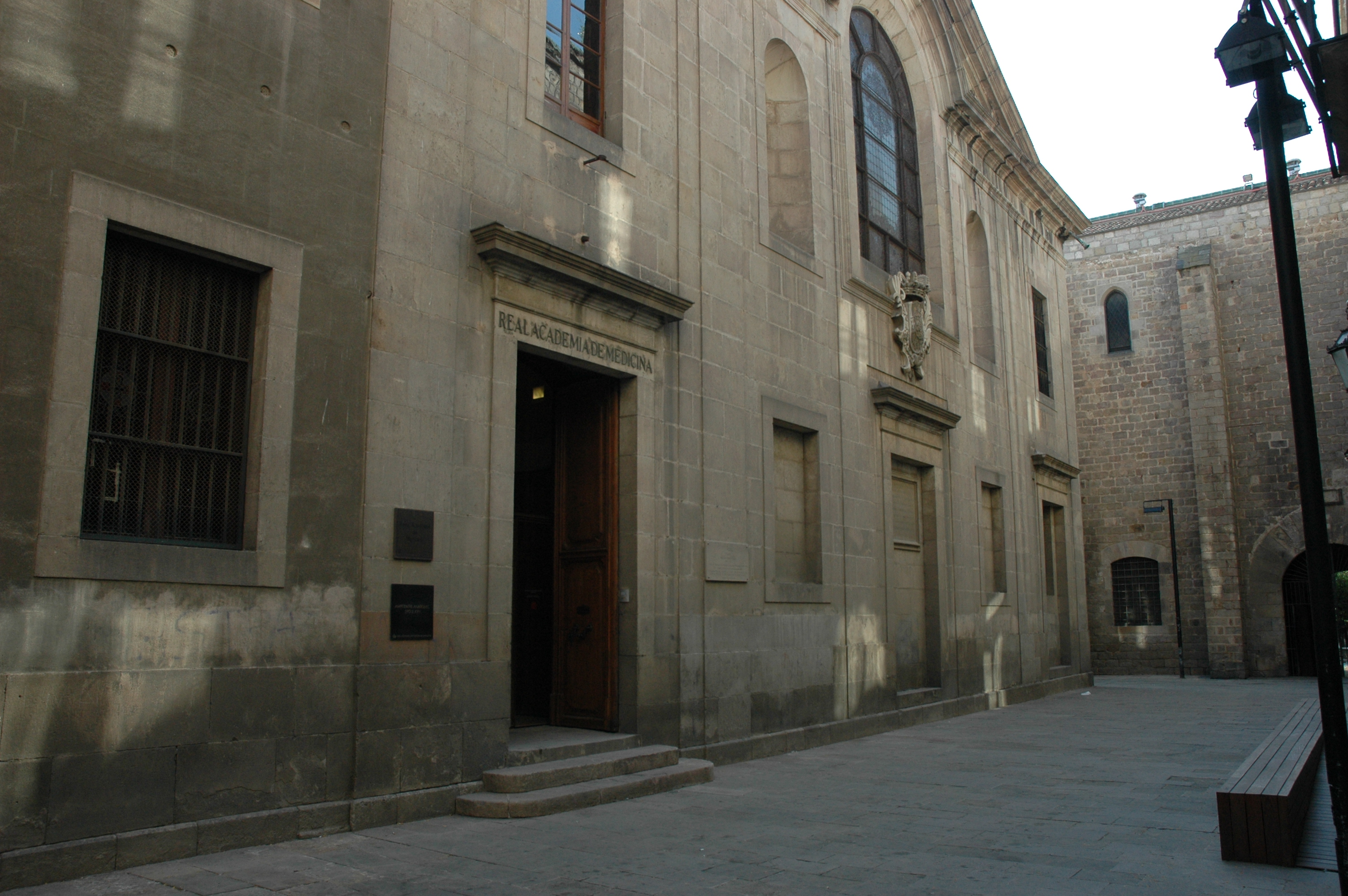
Former College of Surgeons (18th century)

== See also ==
- Museu Tèxtil i d'Indumentària
