= List of Bienes de Interés Cultural in the Province of Barcelona =

This is a list of Bien de Interés Cultural landmarks in the Province of Barcelona, Catalonia, Spain.

- Castell de Santa Florentina, Canet de Mar
- Chapel of Santa Ágata
- Church of Santa Ana
- Monumental church complex of Sant Pere de Terrassa
- Monestir de Sant Llorenç del Munt
- Sant Miquel del Fai
- Santa Maria de Serrateix
- Sant Pere de Casserres
- Sant Quirze de Pedret
