= Santa Anna de Barcelona =

Church of Santa Anna
- Església de Santa Anna (Catalan)
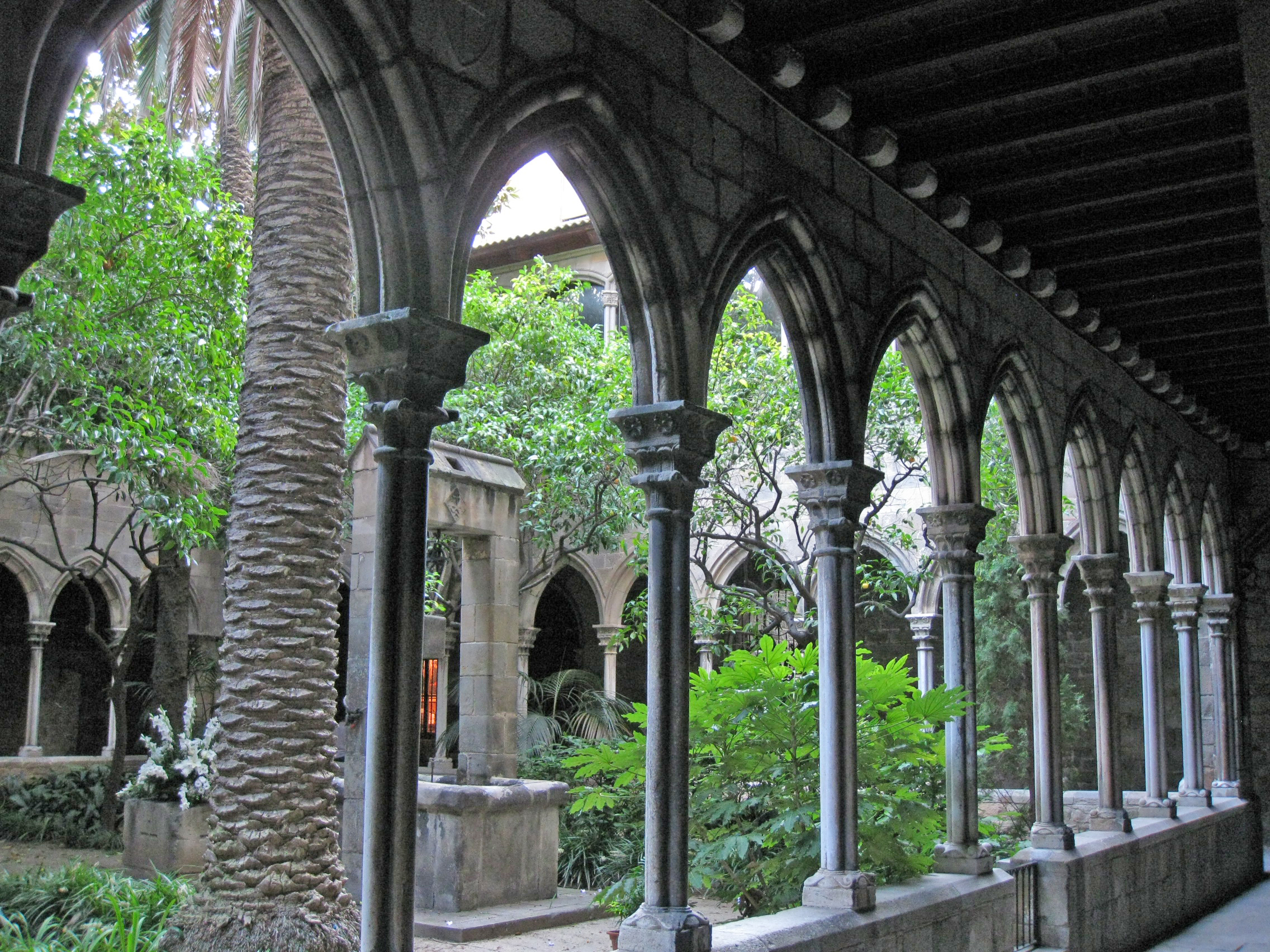

- Location within Catalonia
- 41.38591°N 2.171409°E
- Location: Barcelona, Catalonia, Spain

Site notes
- Website: http://www.parroquiasantaanna.org/

Spanish Cultural Heritage
- Official name: Iglesia de Santa Ana
- Type: Non-movable
- Criteria: Monument
- Designated: 1881
- Reference no.: RI-51-0000029

The Church of Santa Anna (Catalan: Església de Santa Anna, Spanish: Iglesia de Santa Ana) is a church located in Barcelona, Catalonia, Spain. It was declared Bien de Interés Cultural in 1881.

== See also ==
- List of Bien de Interés Cultural in the Province of Barcelona
