= Joan Maragall Archive =

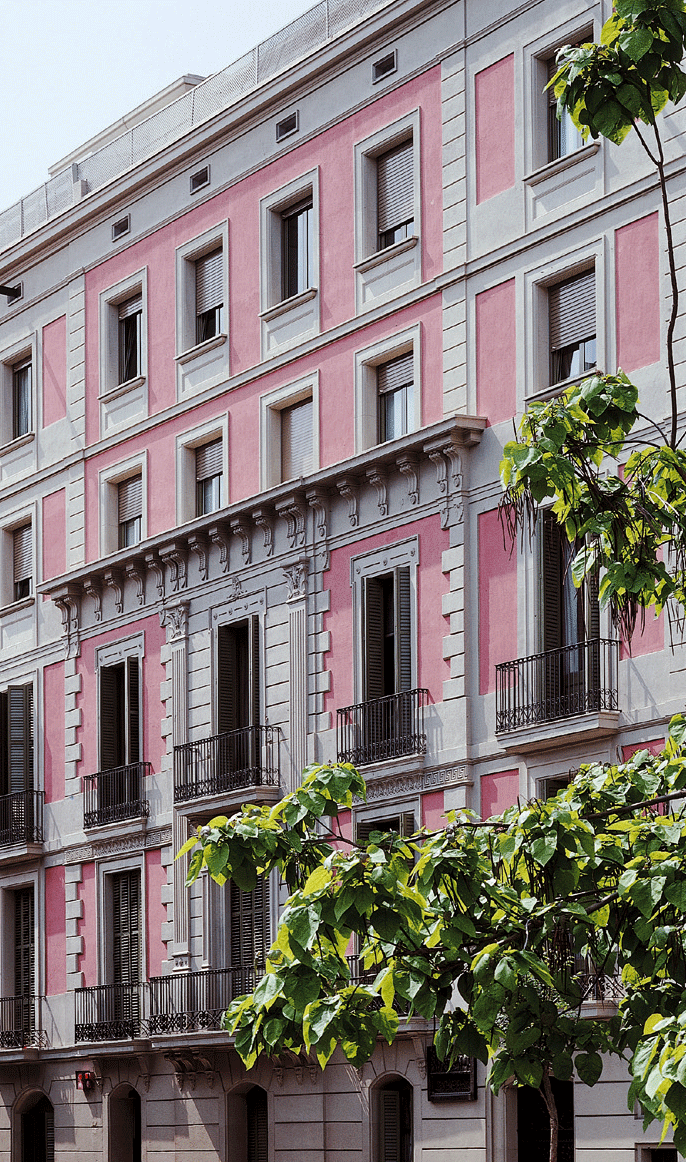
- Archive facade
- Established: 1911
- Location: Carrer d'Alfons XII, 79, Sarrià - Sant Gervasi, Barcelona
- Coordinates: 41°24′2.96″N 2°8′50.11″E
- Website: Official website

The Joan Maragall Archive is a documentation center that brings together a documentary on the life and work of the poet Joan Maragall and Modernism in general. The centre is placed in the last residence of Joan Maragall, at Alfons XII street, in the neighbourhood of Sant Gervasi, Barcelona. It is a reserve section of the National Library of Catalonia and is open to researchers of the poet's work. It is also a historic house museum that displays the interior of the last residence of the poet and which can be viewed by guided tour or individual visit.

== History ==
The Archive was established shortly after the death of the poet, in 1911, by his widow, Clara Noble, who put together the first edition of his complete works and collected his documentary legacy. The Maragall family assumed the maintenance of the archive until 1993 when, thanks to an agreement with the Generalitat de Catalunya, the centre became institutionalized and was assigned to the Biblioteca de Catalunya.

== Content ==
- Manuscripts: a comprehensive collection of documents, among which stands out the correspondence with more than a thousand letters sent and received, over a hundred manuscripts of original literary work, some forty translations made by Maragall himself, diaries and notebooks of personal use. Many of the originals are digitized and available on the web.
- Private library: around one thousand items.
- First editions: first editions of all the works of the poet and later to the present.
- Critical collection: a critical collection of different authors on Maragall's work, the original and printed scores from more than one hundred musicians on poems by the author, the iconographic collection (drawings, engravings, photographs, paintings, etc.) and about 10,000 press clippings.

== Museum house ==
The house is also a museum and you can visit different rooms that have been preserved, after the reform of 1957, that transformed the house into a block of flats. The visiting areas are the hall, the noble hall, the living room, the office and two bedrooms where some objects of the poet and his family are kept. The house contains works by artists like Santiago Rusiñol, Ramon Casas, Joaquim Sunyer, Joquim Mir, Josep Clarà, Manolo Hugué and the brothers, Josep i Joan Llimona, as well as photographs and portraits of figures, cities and venues. The furniture mixes classic style with modernist pieces.

== Activities ==
The archive organizes tours and training sessions:

- Wednesday from 16 am to 20 pm, guided tours for groups.
- Tuesday and Thursday from 10 am to 14 pm training sessions for secondary school students.

The Archives also organizes activities linked with Maragall and poetry reading clubs, musical cycles, concerts, poetry readings, exhibitions. The museum space is used for presentations and conferences.
