= Library of Catalonia =

National library in Catalonia

- Biblioteca de Catalunya

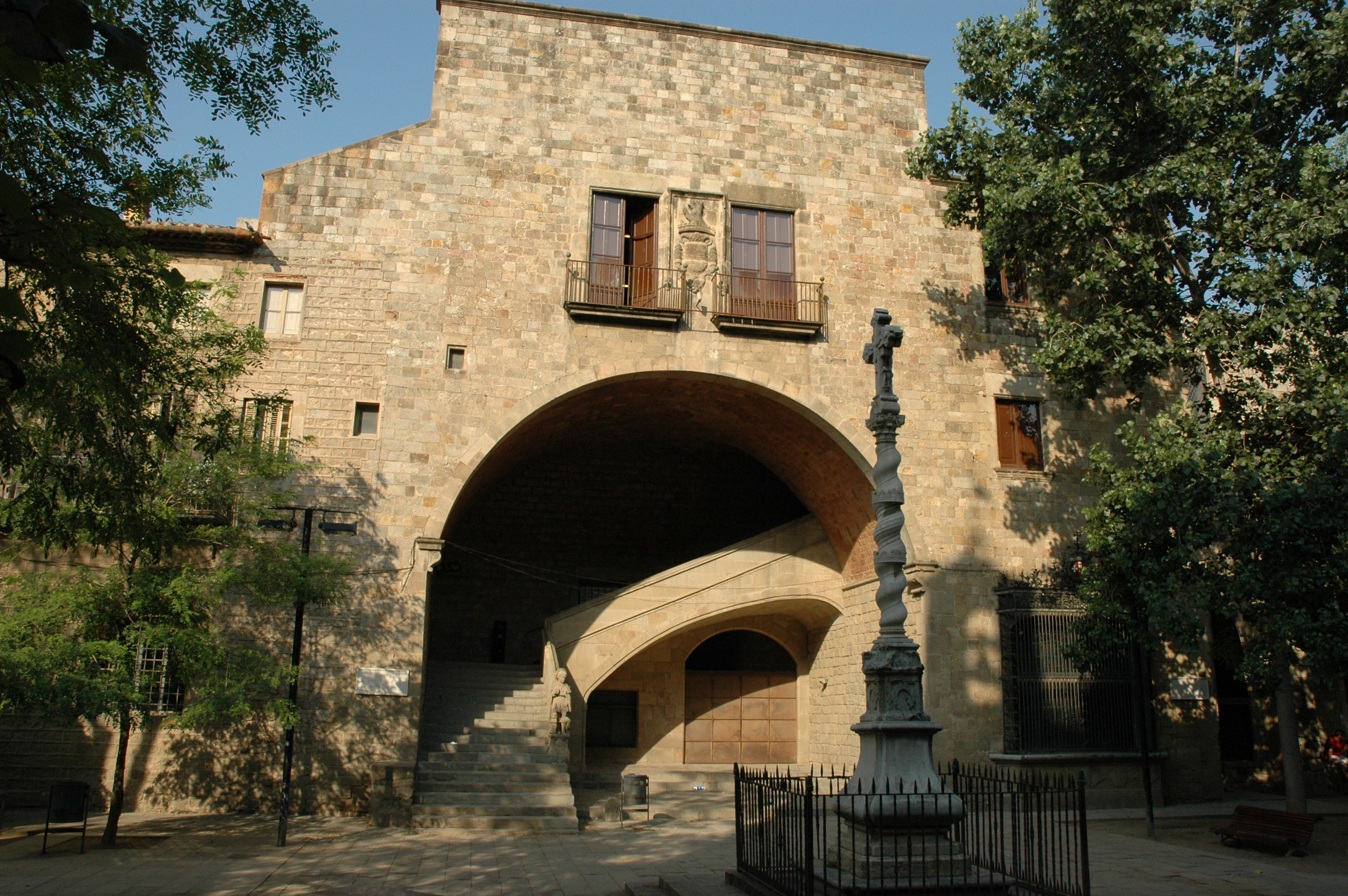
- Main entrance
- 41°22′52″N 2°10′11″E
- Location: C/Hospital, 56; Barcelona
- Type: National library
- Established: 1907 (113 years ago)

Collection
- Items collected: Books, journals, newspapers, magazines, sound and music recordings, maps, stamps, prints, drawings and manuscripts
- Size: 3,967,439 items
- Legal deposit: Yes, since 1981

Access and use
- Access requirements: Readers must be over 18 years of age, and have a reader's card
- Members: 299,552 (2019)

Other information
- Budget: €7,837,130 (2020)
- Employees: 152 (2020)
- Website: www.bnc.cat

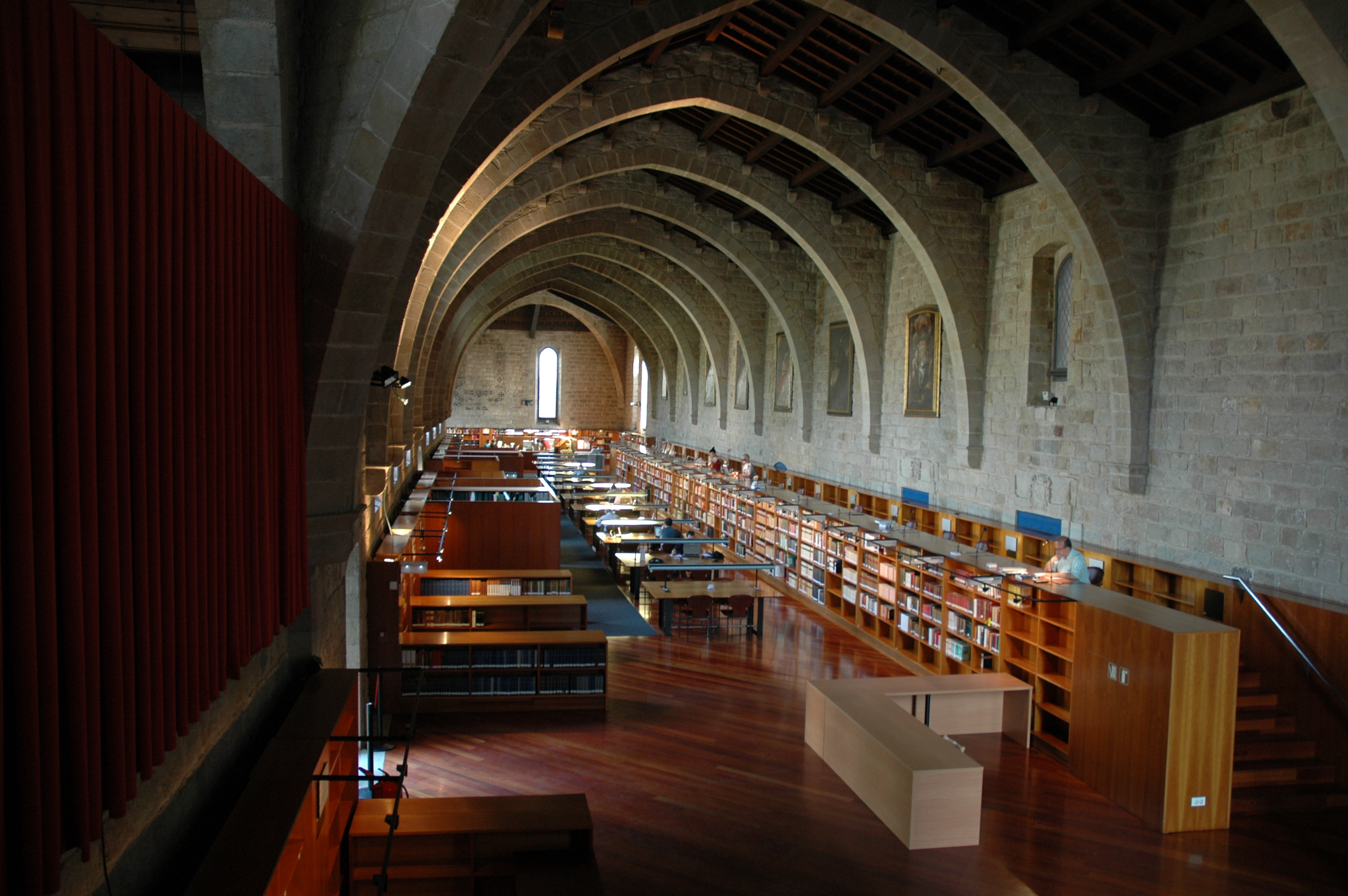
Main hall

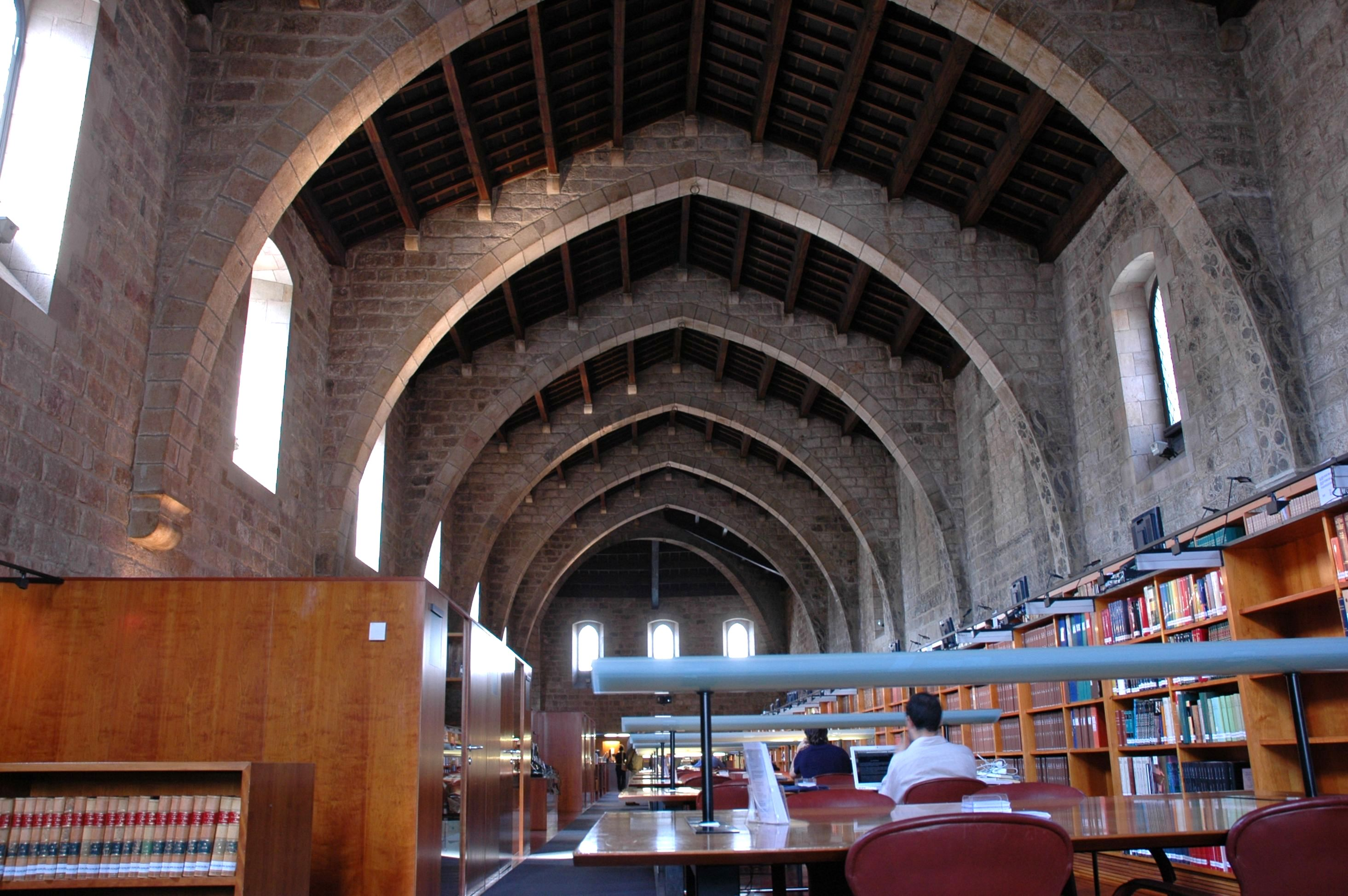
Former hospital building where the library was inaugurated in 1940

The Library of Catalonia (Catalan: Biblioteca de Catalunya, IPA: [biβli.uˈtɛkə ðə kətəˈluɲə]) is the Catalan national library, located in Barcelona, Catalonia, Spain. The primary mission of the Library of Catalonia is to collect, preserve, and spread Catalan bibliographic production and that related to the Catalan linguistic area, to look after its conservation, and to spread its bibliographic heritage while maintaining the status of a center for research and consultation.

The Library occupies 8,820 m^{2} and has nearly about four million items. It is a special member of the Consortium of European Research Libraries (CERL).

== History ==
The library was founded in 1907, as the library of the Institute for Catalan Studies (Institut d'Estudis Catalans, IEC). It was opened to the public on 28 May 1914, in the time of the recently founded Commonwealth of Catalonia, and was housed in the Palau de la Generalitat de Catalunya.

In 1914, the Commonwealth of Catalonia converted the library of the IEC into a public cultural service. In its early days, the Library was situated in an area of the Palau de la Generalitat in Barcelona. In 1929, the Library was acquired by the city government of Barcelona. In 1931, the 15th century buildings formerly occupied by the (Old) Hospital de la Santa Creu were declared a part of Spain's historical patrimony; and the municipality of Barcelona approved the cession of large portion of the site to the Biblioteca de Catalunya.

During the Republic era (1931-1939), the process of relocation began. In 1934, the Generalitat confirmed its status of general institution with full legal personality by the Law of the Service of Libraries. In 1936, the first reading room of the new seat, the Sala Cervantina, was opened, but the project was halted because of the Spanish Civil War (1936–1939) and not all of the necessary adaptations were completed. After the fall of Barcelona in January 1939, the library was closed until 1940. After the Spanish Civil War, in 1940, the Library was reopened under the new name of Biblioteca Central ("Central Library") by Francoist dictatorship and moved to its new site, where it remains to this day. In Francoist Spain, the institution was turned into a general use library, which was intended to supplement the deficiencies of the public and university libraries.

In 1981, two years after the restoration of Catalan self-government, it was made the national library of Catalonia by the Llei de biblioteques ("Libraries law"), approved by the Parliament of Catalonia, conferring upon it the duties of the reception, conservation, and distribution of the Catalan legal deposit. In 1993, the Law of the Library System of Catalonia extended the institution's depository functions and helped in its modernization, which included the remodelling of the building, its reorganization and the digitization of its procedures.

During the 1990s, a major renovation project further transformed the Library, including the construction of four underground levels of storage (creating more than 40 kilometres of shelf-space) and the annex building. In 1998, the Library renovated the Gothic elements of its buildings and extended its space, thanks to the construction of a new services building.

== Partnership with Google ==
In 2007, the Biblioteca de Catalunya and four more Catalan libraries agreed to join the digitization project. These libraries have begun digitizing books of theirs that are in the public domain. The digitization partnership project is intended to make these books available on the Internet. The Biblioteca de Catalunya acts as coordinator and intermediary on behalf of the other four Catalan libraries participating in the project:

- the library of the Monastery of Montserrat,
- the Public Episcopal Library of the Seminary of Barcelona,
- the Library of the Barcelona Excursionist Centre and
- the Library of the Barcelona Athenaeum.

The Catalan libraries group became the second non-Anglo-Saxon collaborator to join the Google Books Library Project, within the Google Book Search program. In 1977, the Library of Catalonia joined another Spanish participant in the project, the Complutense University of Madrid.

== Statistics ==
- Linear metres of shelving:
  - Free access: 1,500 m (20,000 volumes)
  - Closed stacks: 49,000 m
- Total surface area of the Biblioteca: 15,000 m^{2}
- Total surface area of the General reading room: 2,700 m^{2}
- Surface area of the Reserve room: 360 m^{2}
- Seats (reading points): 229
- Total documents: 3 million (estimated)

== See also ==
- List of libraries in Spain
- Google Book Search
- Google Books Library Project
- PADICAT
- Joan Maragall Archive
- Name and Title Authority File of Catalonia
- Llista d'encapçalaments de matèria en català
