= Literature of Andorra =

The literature of Andorra is part of Catalan literature, that is, of literature in the Catalan language. It is the literature represented by the writings created in the Principality of Andorra or by Andorran authors.

== The beginnings of Andorran literature ==
The Encyclopedic Dictionary of Andorra, by Àlvar Valls, presents the image of a literature that already produced its first works in the 18th century, with the Manual Digest by Antoni Fiter i Rossell and the Politar Andorrà by Antoni Puig. The Manual Digest "is a "compendium of the historical and institutional reality and of the uses and customs of Andorra followed by a compilation of annotated maxims, which is considered one of the most important books of its kind in the Catalan language of the 18th century and that for more than three centuries has been a source of reference and a behavioral guide for the rulers of Andorra and Andorrans in general." (Vals, 259). In the 19th century, religious works stand out and travel literature also appears, especially written by foreigners.

=== Manual Digest ===
The book by Antoni Fiter i Rossell is entitled Manual Digest de las Valls neutras de Andorra, en lo qual se tracta de sa Antiguitat, Govern y Religio, de sos Privilegis, Usos, Preheminencias y Prerrogativas. It is an eminent work of literature in the Catalan language of the 18th century. For more than three centuries it was used as a manual for the governors of the principality, as for the inhabitants of the Valleys. The book was kept in the Casa de la Vall, the central place of the General Council of Andorra. In 1987 the General Council published a facsimile and in 2000 the Manual Digest was published as a pocket book.

=== Historical and institutional works ===
In 1763 Antoni Puig published the Politar Andorrà. Puig was a priest in Escaldes–Engordany. This book is a kind of reduced version of the Manual Digest, but it also had a great influence on Andorran society.

Until the 19th century the tradition of historical and institutional manuals continued. It is worth mentioning the Relació sobre la vall de Andorra of 1838, by the Dominican brother Tomás Junoy and Història de Nostra Senyora de Meritxell of 1874, written by the Jesuit Luis Ignasi Fiter i Cava who in the principality published the book anonymously.

== Travel literature ==
At the end of the 18th century, a literature known as travel literature was formed. Typically, the works of this literature were not written by Andorrans but by foreign travelers, especially from France, Spain or the United States. Àlvar Valls Oliva distinguishes the authors into three groups:

1) Officials from neighboring states. 2) Romantic travelers or utopians. 3) Catalan travelers.

Francisco de Zamora, who in his story Diary of trips made in Catalonia writes extensively about Andorra; Pascual Madoz, who in the Geographical, statistical and historical dictionary of Spain and its overseas possessions also includes a chronicle of the Pyrenean country.

The Spanish soldier Antoni Valls published in 1820 in Barcelona the book Memory on the sovereignty that corresponds to the Spanish Nation, where he recommends the annexation of Andorra by Spain. The political answer appeared three years later by the French monarchist Pierre-Roch Roussillou who wrote the book De l'Andorre (About Andorra), at the same time the first complete monograph on the principality.

For romantic travelers and American and French Utopians, Andorra was an isolated, exotic and sometimes strange country. The French Victorin Vidal wrote L'Andorre in 1866, and Marcel Chevalier presented the first map of the Andorran valleys. Gaston Vuillier published Le val de Andorre in 1888. The Americans Bayard Taylor with The Republic of the Pyrenees in 1867 and The Hidden Republic in 1911 as well as Lee Meriwether with Seeing Europe by automobile, also in 1911. In 1933, the French Gaston Combarnous published The valleys of Andorra and in 1937 Imogene Warder published On foot through Andorra.

The accounts of Catalan travelers around 1900 show quite similar cultural interests. Joseph Aladern published the Cartas andorranas in 1892. Other important authors are Valentí Almirall, Salvador Armet, Artur Osona and Jacint Verdaguer.

In the 20th century, some authors chose the principality as the subject of their works, especially in French and Catalan literature. In addition, essays were published such as the Llibre d'Andorra by Lluís Capdevila in 1958, the Glossari andorrà by Josep Fontbernat in 1966, as well as the essays by the Catalan writer Josep Pla, published in 1943, 1959 and 1973.

The L'Andorra dels viatgers series once again presents the old travel texts, edited by contemporary authors, for example Albert Villaró. Today, despite the fact that the Principality of Andorra has a modern circulation network and is connected to the international media, only a few books about Andorra are written by foreign writers. One example is the Austrian author Klaus Ebner who published the essay Andorranische Impressionen (Andorran Impressions) at the Wieser publishing house in Carinthia. The writer Alfred Llahí Segalàs recounted the passage of Saint Josemaría Escrivá de Balaguer through the Principality of Andorra in 1937, in his book Andorra: host soil (2007). On the other hand, the Andorran writer Joan Peruga chose Andorran travel literature, especially that of the 19th century, as the central theme of his 2004 novel The Invisible Republic.

== Contemporary literature ==
"Modern" literature began in the 1980s and intensified as a result of the independence of the condominium in 1993. The General Council of Andorra, that is, the Andorran parliament, and the new government began to decisively promote literature with calls, prizes and measures in schools. Today there are several Andorran authors who already have a remarkable reputation in the Països Catalans, for example Teresa Colom, Antoni Morell, Albert Salvadó and Albert Villaró. At the Frankfurt Book Fair in 2007, seven Andorran authors participated in the events. The La Puça bookstore in Andorra la Vieja has become an information center for the country's authors.

=== Historical novel ===
Many of the prose writers have written historical novels during their careers, reflecting on the history of the condominium. Albert Salvadó seems an exception because on the one hand he writes historical novels and on the other hand he rarely deals with the past of his country.

We find Andorran topics in Antoni Morell's novels in Seven Litanies of Death and Boris I, King of Andorra; in Albert Villaró's novels in The Year of the Franks; in Joan Peruga's work in Last summer in Ordino, and in Josep Enric Dallerès's work in Inside the border.

=== Poetry ===
Thanks to the initiatives of the Andorran government, a poetic field grew. Manuel Anglada i Ferran published scientific works and poetry; and personalities such as Manel Gibert, Sícoris, Robert Pastor, Teresa Colom, Ester Fenoll Garcia and Marta Repullo represent the world of Andorran poetry. Until recently Josep Enric Dallerès published only poetry; in 2007 he published his first novel. Teresa Colom i Pich, an economist by training and by profession, decided in 2004 to dedicate herself exclusively to writing.

=== Literary awards ===
Many literary prizes have been created in the Catalan Countries. Due to minority language status and strong cultural awareness, the awards aim to discover new talent and allow authors to dedicate exclusive time to writing.

Many of Andorra's well-known writers have been awarded. For example, Antoni Morell won the San Miguel de Engolasters essay prize and the Charlemagne Prize for novels in 1999; Albert Salvadó twice won the Nèstor Luján Prize for historical novels (1998 and 2005), the Fiter and Rossell Prize (1999), the Planeta Black Series Award (2000) and also the Charlemagne Prize for novels (2002); Albert Villaró received the Anna Dodas Memorial Prize (1993), the Nèstor Luján Prize (2003), the Charlemagne Prize for novels (2006), the Josep Pla (2014) and the Prudenci Bertrana Prize (2015), and Teresa Colom received the Poetry Contest Prize from the Government of Andorra Public Library (2000), the Grandalla Poetry Prize from the Circle of Arts and Letters of Andorra (2000), the FNAC Talent (2009) for On tot és vidre (Pagès Editors), and the Maria Àngels Anglada Narrative Prize (2016), for Miss Keaton and other beasts.

=== Andorran authors ===
- Manuel Anglada i Ferran, 1918–1998
- David Arrabal Carrión, b. 1977
- Pilar Burgués Monserrat, b. 1958
- Montserrat Cayuela i Bragulat, b. 1953
- Teresa Colom i Pich, b. 1973
- Josep Enric Dallerès, b. 1949
- Ester Fenoll Garcia, b. 1967
- David Gálvez Casellas, b. 1970
- Alexandra Grebennikova Vólkova, b. 1974
- Manel Gibert Vallès, b. 1966
- Ludmilla Lacueva Canut, b. 1971
- Juli Minoves Triquell, b. 1969
- Antoni Morell Mora, 1941-2020
- Robert Pastor i Castillo, b. 1945
- Joan Peruga Guerrero, b. 1954
- Marta Repullo i Grau, b. 1976
- Iñaki Rubio Manzano, b. 1974
- Albert Salvadó Miras, 1951-2020
- Sícoris, 1922–2006
- Albert Villaró Boix, b. 1964
- Anneke van de Wal, b. 1968

== Professional representation and publishers ==
The Association of Writers of the Principality of Andorra (AEPA) is the professional representation of Andorran authors. Since its foundation in 1995, the president is Antoni Morell Mora. The AEPA maintains relations with the Association of Writers in the Catalan Language and the Catalan PEN.

After the Second World War, a very intensive publishing activity was developed in the Principality of Andorra. At first the publishers produced books for Spain and France, books in Spanish and French, and most of them were religious publications. The publication of books in the Catalan language began during the 1960s and increased during the following decade, and especially after the death of the dictator Franco. The first contemporary Catalan Bible was published and printed in Andorra by order of the Benedictine monks of the Montserrat monastery, in the graphic workshops of the Editorial Casal y Vall.

At the end of the 1970s, publishers changed their strategy to publish books for the use of the resident population (at the same time the Andorranization of education was being established). That is why, above all, books were published in the Catalan language, but also tourist books in other languages.

Of the hundred publishers founded since World War II (including author-publishers), the number has shrunk considerably. They publish primarily literature, administrative books and tourist works. In May 2011, the Associació d'Editors d'Andorra was created, made up of Editorial Andorra, Limites Editorial, Anem editors, Edicions del Diari d'Andorra and Fundació Julià Reig. Most of the books by Andorran writers are published by Catalan publishers.

Recently, the publisher Trotalibros, which emerged from the YouTube channel and blog of the same name, is proving to be remarkably popular, both in Andorra and in Spain and Latin America.
