= Ramon Llull (disambiguation) =

Ramon Llull was a Majorcan writer and philosopher born in 1232. The name may also refer to things named in his honor:

- Fundació Ramon Llull, an organization promoting the Catalan language and culture
- Institut Ramon Llull, a government consortium promoting the Catalan language and culture
- University Ramon Llull, a private university in Barcelona, Spain
- Ramon Llull Award, an honor awarded annually by the Government of the Balearic Islands to persons or entities of the Balearic Islands that have excelled in any field
- Ramon Llull Novel Award, bestowed annually for novels, memoires and essays originally written in Catalan
