= Mary Newman =

Mary Newman may refer to:

- Mary B. Newman (1909–1995), American politician and state government official
- Mary Ann Newman (fl. 1970s–2020s), translator, editor and writer on Catalan culture
