= Fundació Ramon Llull =

Public foundation

The Fundació Ramon Llull (Catalan pronunciation: [fundəsiˈo rəˈmoɲ ˈʎuʎ], English: "Ramon Llull Foundation"), also known by the acronym FRL, is an international organization constituted in 2008 in order to promote the Catalan language and culture internationally. It was established by the governments of Andorra, Catalonia and the Balearic Islands. The foundation is named after Ramon Llull, a medieval writer and philosopher from the Balearic Islands.

== Establishment ==
The foundation was established in 2008 by the governments of Catalonia, Andorra and the Balearic Islands. The foundation's members are the following institutions from countries and regions where Catalan language is spoken: the Government of Andorra, the Ramon Llull Institute (through which the governments of Catalonia and the Balearic Islands participate), the General Council of the Pyrénées-Orientales, the city council of Alghero and the Network of Valencian Cities. The foundation is named after Ramon Llull, a medieval writer and philosopher from the Balearic Islands, who is considered the first notable writer in the Catalan language and contributed substantially to its development. In 2009 the representation in the foundation was expanded to cover all Catalan-speaking areas except Franja de Ponent.

== Location and structure ==
FRL headquarters are in Andorra la Vella, the capital of Andorra. Its president is the head of government of Andorra. Since 2022, its director is Andorran Author Teresa Colom.

== Activities ==
The foundation's mission is to promote the Catalan language and culture internationally. The foundation awards a number of prizes:

The Ramon Llull International Award is awarded jointly with the Fundació Congrés de Cultura Catalana. Notable recipients include Dominic Keown (2023), Mary Ann Newman (2022), Joseph Lo Bianco (2021), Christer Laurén (2018), Kathryn Woolard (2016).

The foundation also presents an award for the best translation of a literary work from Catalan to any other language, and an honorary award to a person who has played a role in the dissemination of Catalan culture. Lastly, the FRL awards the Ramon Llull Catalan Literature Prize (Premi de les Lletres Catalanes Ramon Llull), awarded to a novel written in Catalan.
