= Palau Baró de Quadras =

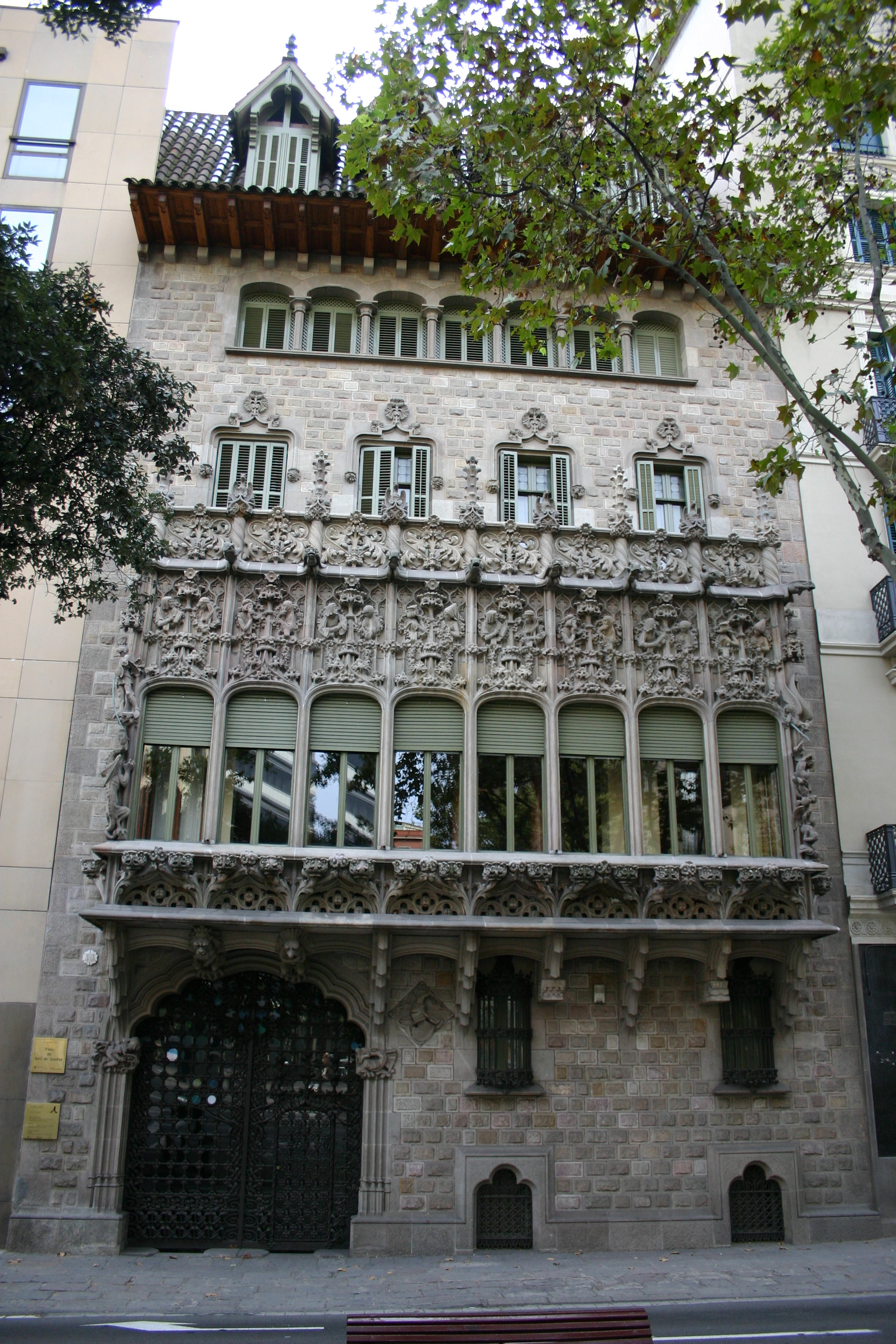

General information
- Architectural style: Modernista
- Location: Diagonal, 373, Barcelona, Spain
- Construction started: 1904

Design and construction
- Architect: Josep Puig i Cadafalch

Website
- https://www.llull.cat/monografics/palaubaroquadras/english/index.cfm

The Palau Baró de Quadras is a small modernista palace located in Barcelona on Avinguda Diagonal, equidistant from La Pedrera and Casa de les Punxes. It was built by the Catalan architect Josep Puig i Cadafalch between 1904 and 1906. In 1976 it was designated as Nacional National Historical Monument of Artistic Interest. Currently houses the main offices of the Institut Ramon Llull.

== The building ==
Starting with a thorough renovation of an existing building on a narrow plot of land that faced Carrer Rosselló, Puig i Cadafalch created this small Modernista building, now with two facades, Diagonal and Rosselló. The palace is situated in the Quadrat d'or, where the most important Modernista buildings can be found including Casa Milà – La Pedrera, Casa Batlló and Casa Calvet designed by Antoni Gaudí, Casa Amatller and Casa de les Punxes created by Josep Puig i Cadafalch or Casa Lleó Morera designed by Lluís Domènech i Montaner.

The Avinguda Diagonal façade has one of the most impressive Gothic revival balconies seen in Modernista architecture. The artisans Alfons Juyol and Eusebi Arnau used carved stone for their design.

The rear façade, facing Carrer Rosselló, has floral motifs extending horizontally and vertically along the three balconies and down the four floors.

The building has an entryway characterized by an elaborate decoration of the stairway, a glasswork on the skylight and a Roman mosaic flooring. Its central position provides the axis around which the stairwell and layout of the first floor revolve. The iron grillwork on the ground floor doors, facing both Avinguda Diagonal and Carrer Rosselló, were forged by master ironworker Manuel Ballarín i Lancuentra.

The large rooms facing Avinguda Diagonal are the most public spaces in the building and meant for receiving visitors. They feature Moorish-style stone arches with colorful ceramic floral motifs and Gothic sculptural elements.

The spaces that face Carrer Rosselló were designed for family use, with more detailed floral stucco relief work gracing the walls. Ionic columns covered with floral and plant motifs, in the English Arts and Crafts style, face the fireplace, the symbol of home life.

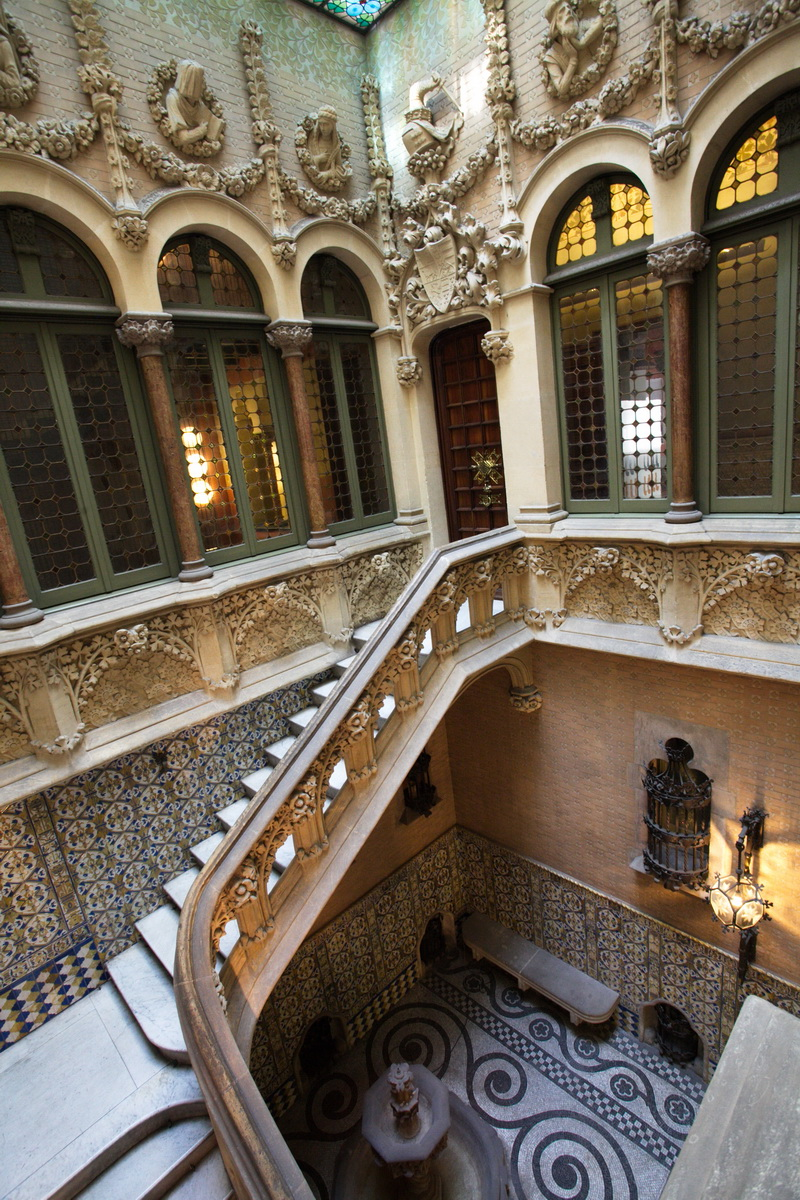
Stairway and interior details.

== Restorations ==
The Palau was restored in 1980 to house the Music Museum of Barcelona. In 2001 this Museum was moved to the Auditori. Between 2003 and 2013, the building served as the official headquarters of Casa Àsia, located now in a Modernista pavilion of the Hospital de la Santa Creu i Sant Pau.

The building currently houses the main offices of the Institut Ramon Llull, a public consortium that comprises the Generalitat de Catalunya (Government of Catalonia), Balearic Islands Government and the Barcelona City Council, with a mission to promote the Catalan language and culture abroad.

The last restoration was in 2015. The architect Àngel Gil and restorers of cultural assets Anna González and Josep Pasqual made the first phase of preventative restoration and conservation of the architectural and ornamental features of the entrance to the Palau Baró de Quadras. The restorers made interventions on elements of stone, mosaics, tiles, sgraffiti and ceiling coffering, and another series of actions on the wrought iron railings, the wooden door in Carrer de Rosselló and the bronze lamps.

== Gallery ==
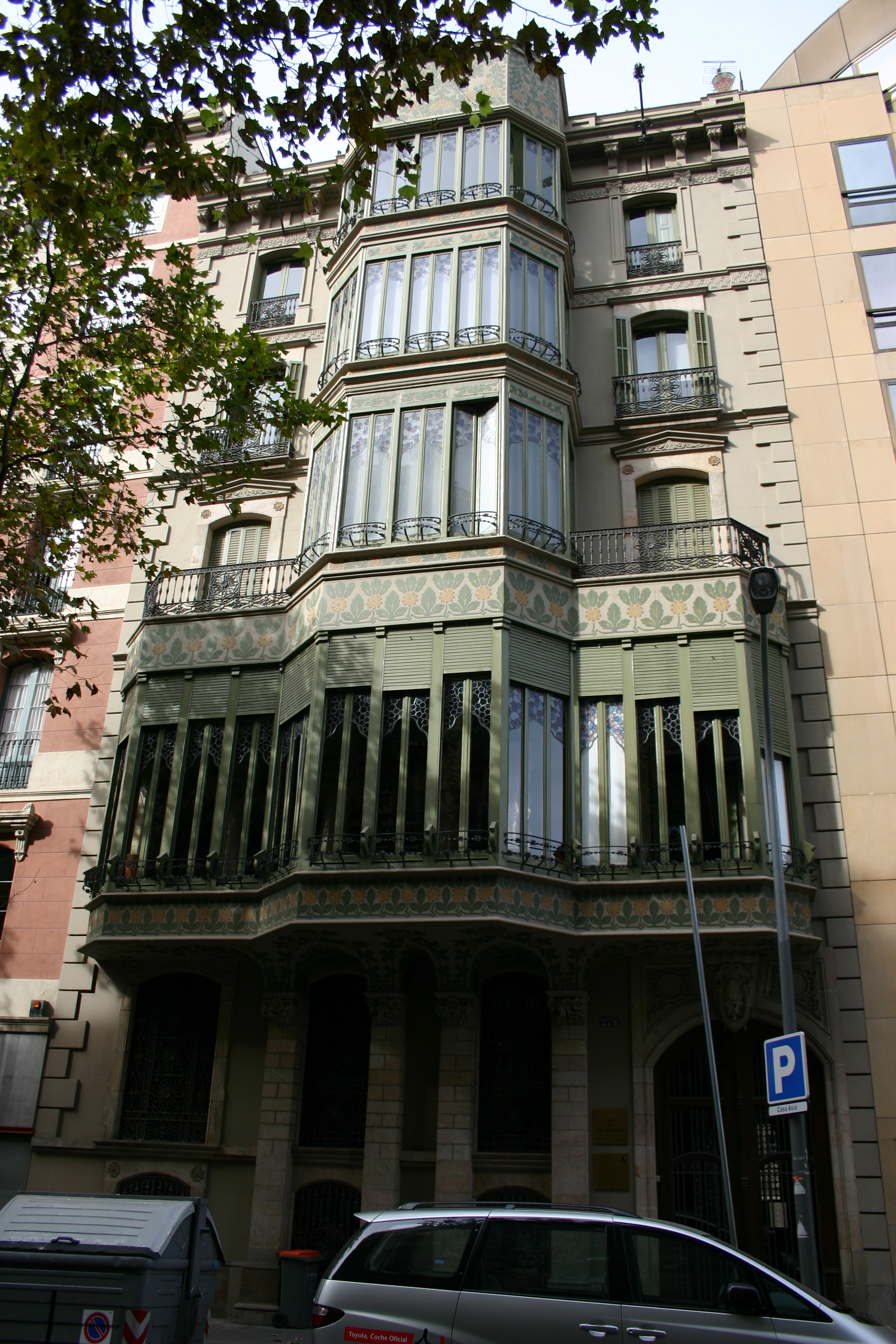
Rear façade, Roselló street.

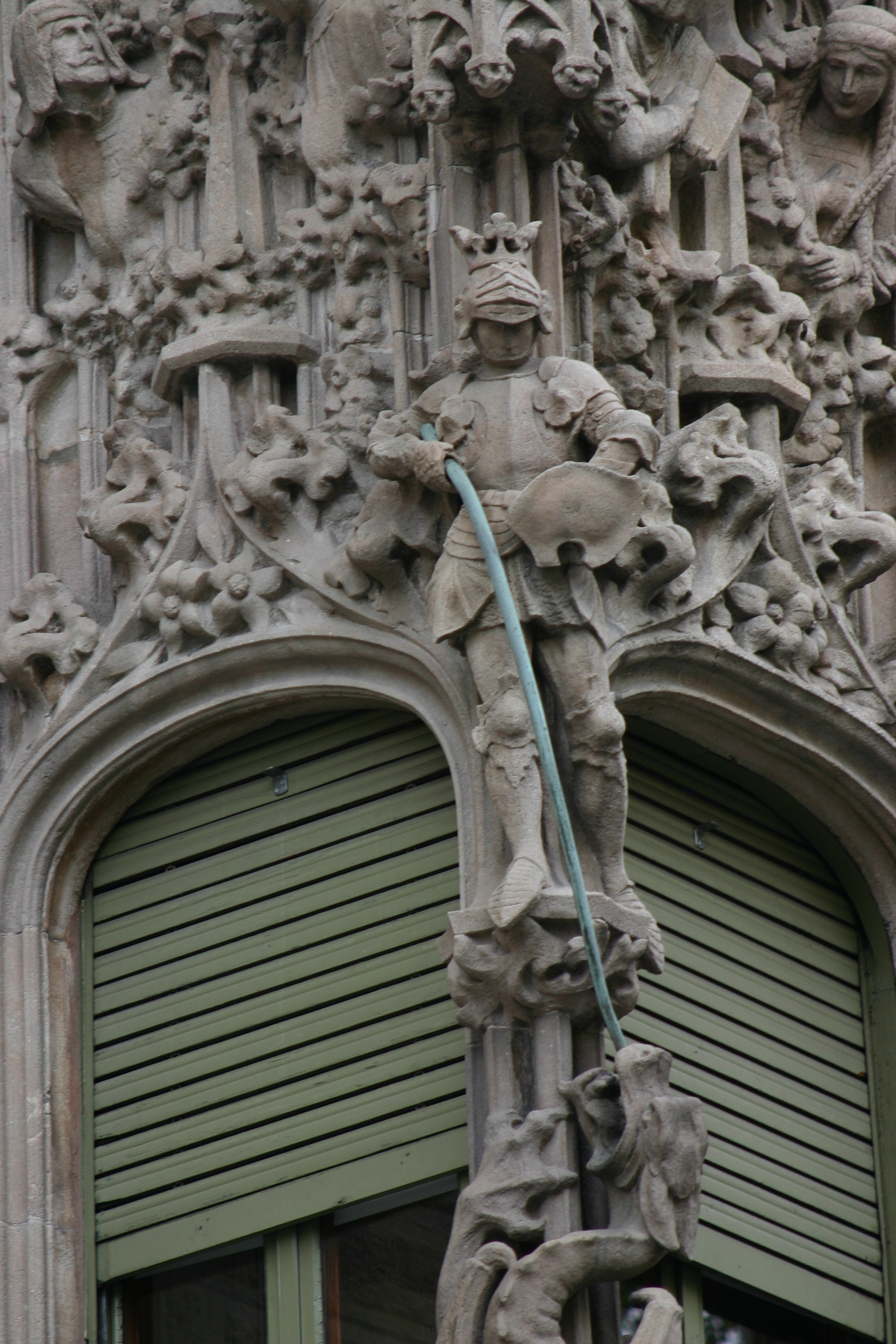
Sant Jordi with the dragon, by Eusebi Arnau.

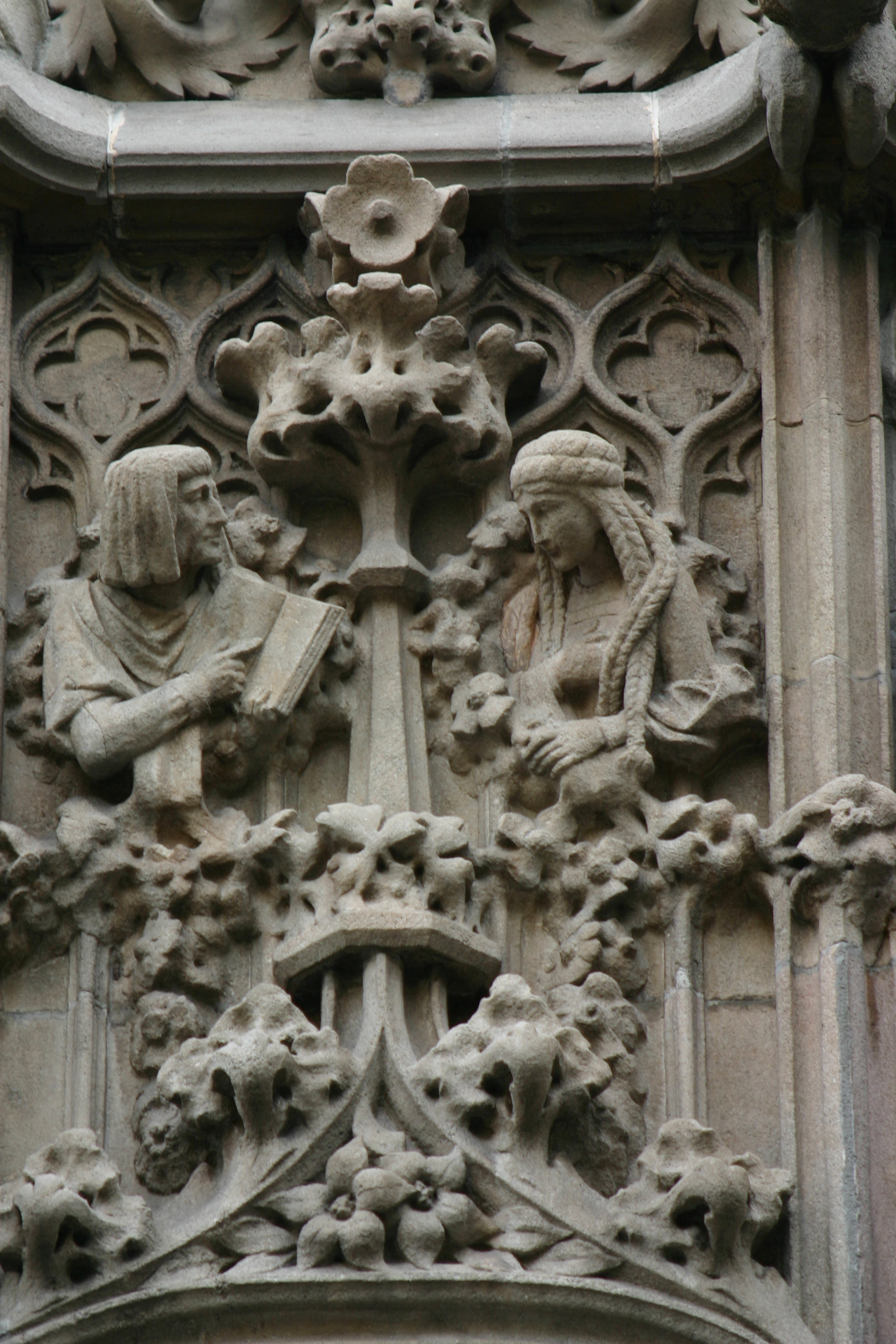
Sculptures on the main facade.

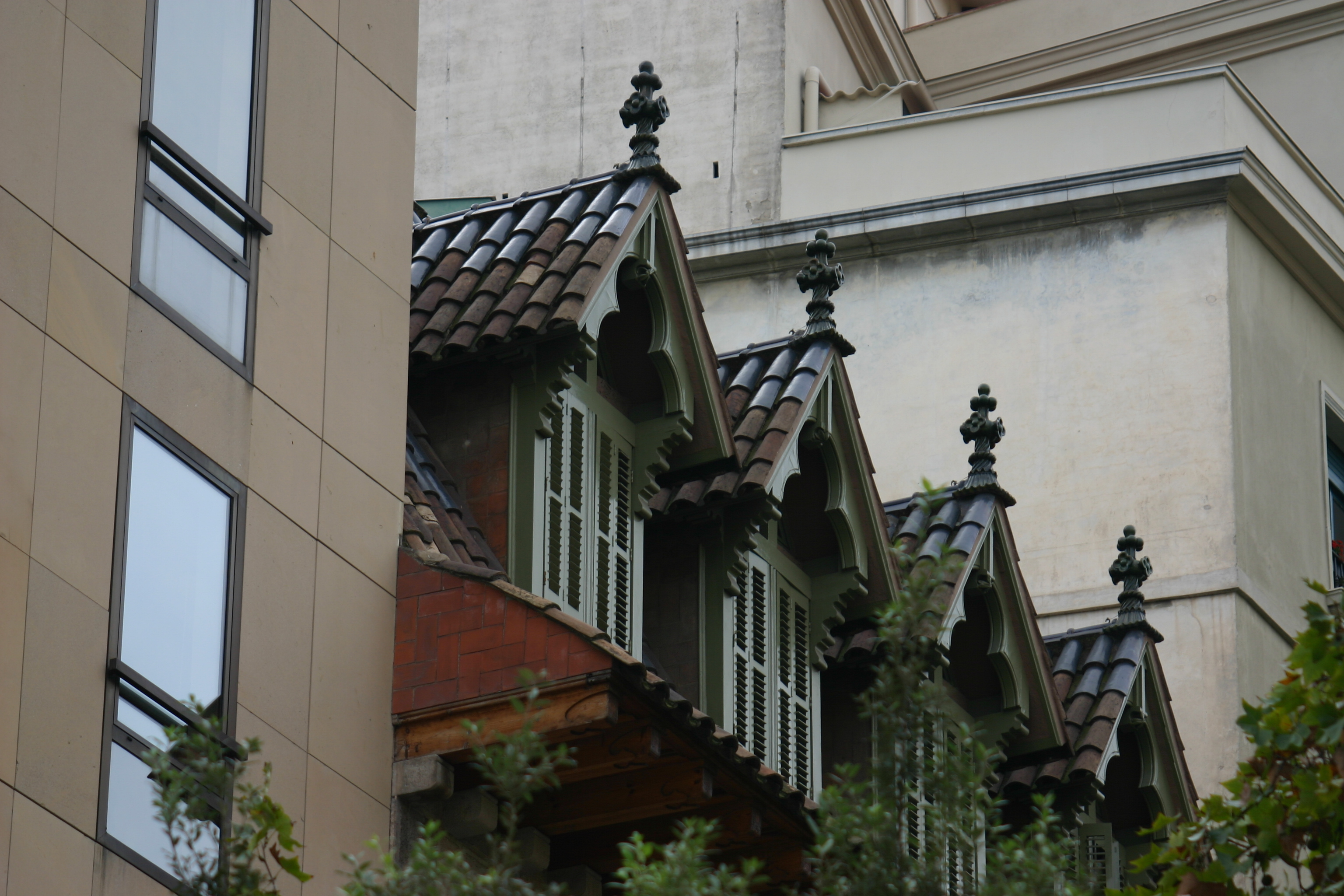
The Mansard roof.

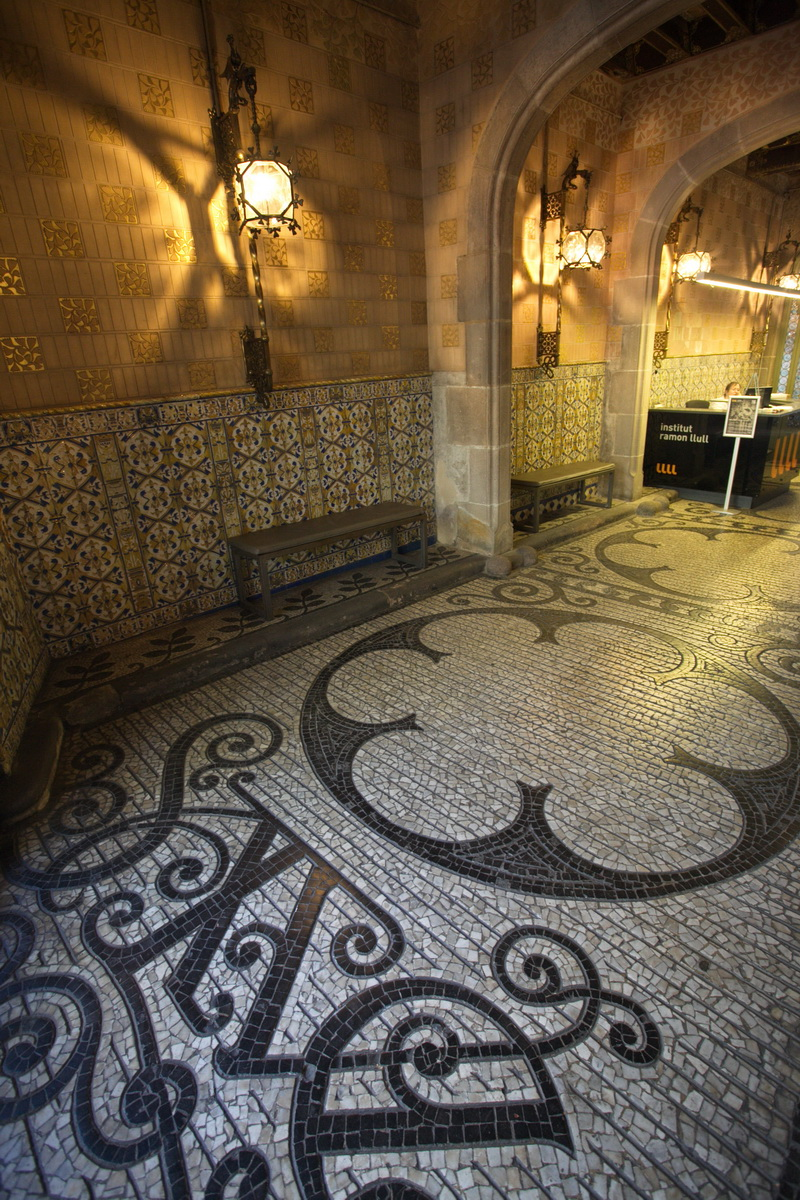
Detail of the entrance's floor mosaic.

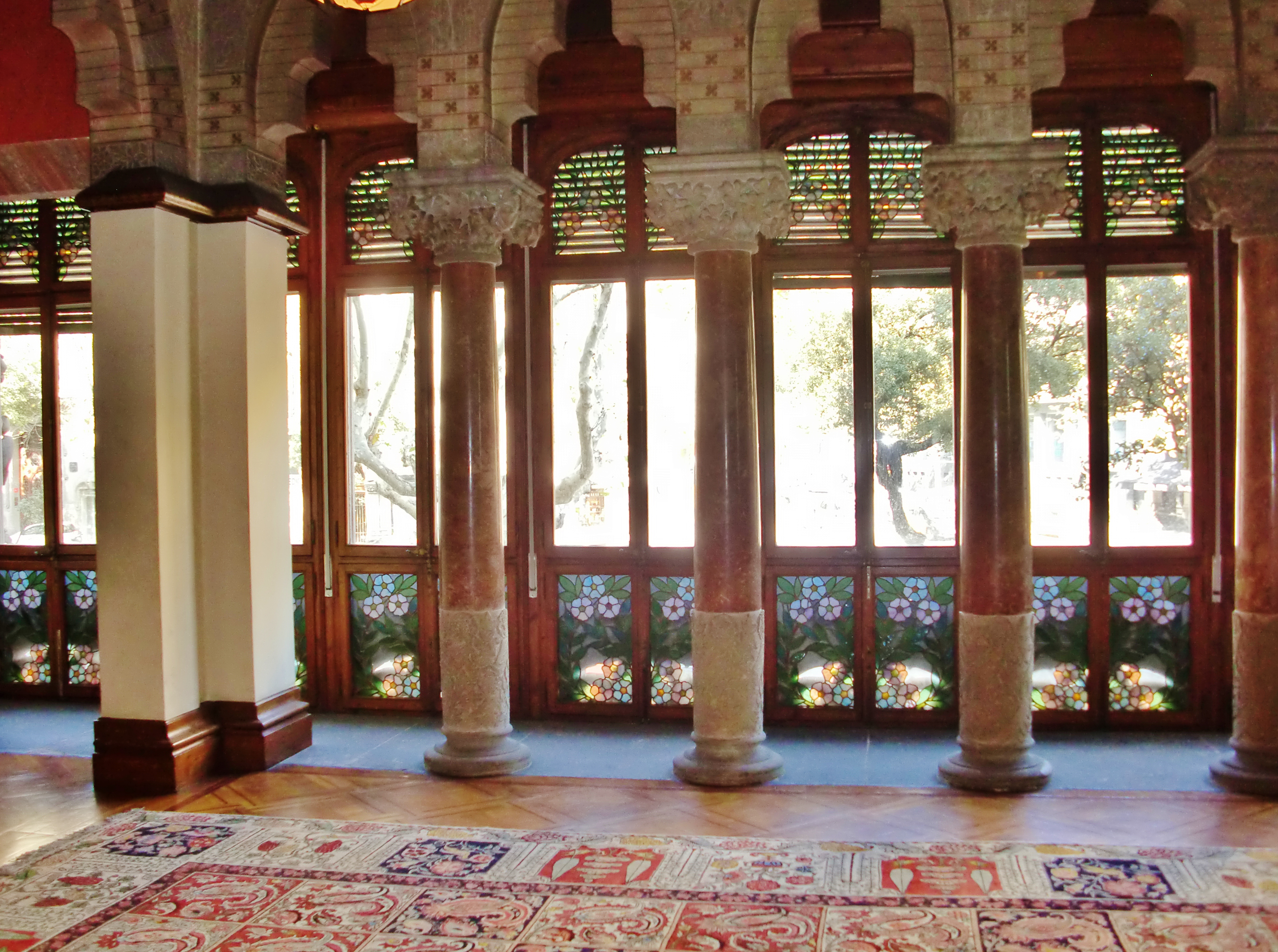
Diagonal room's columns.

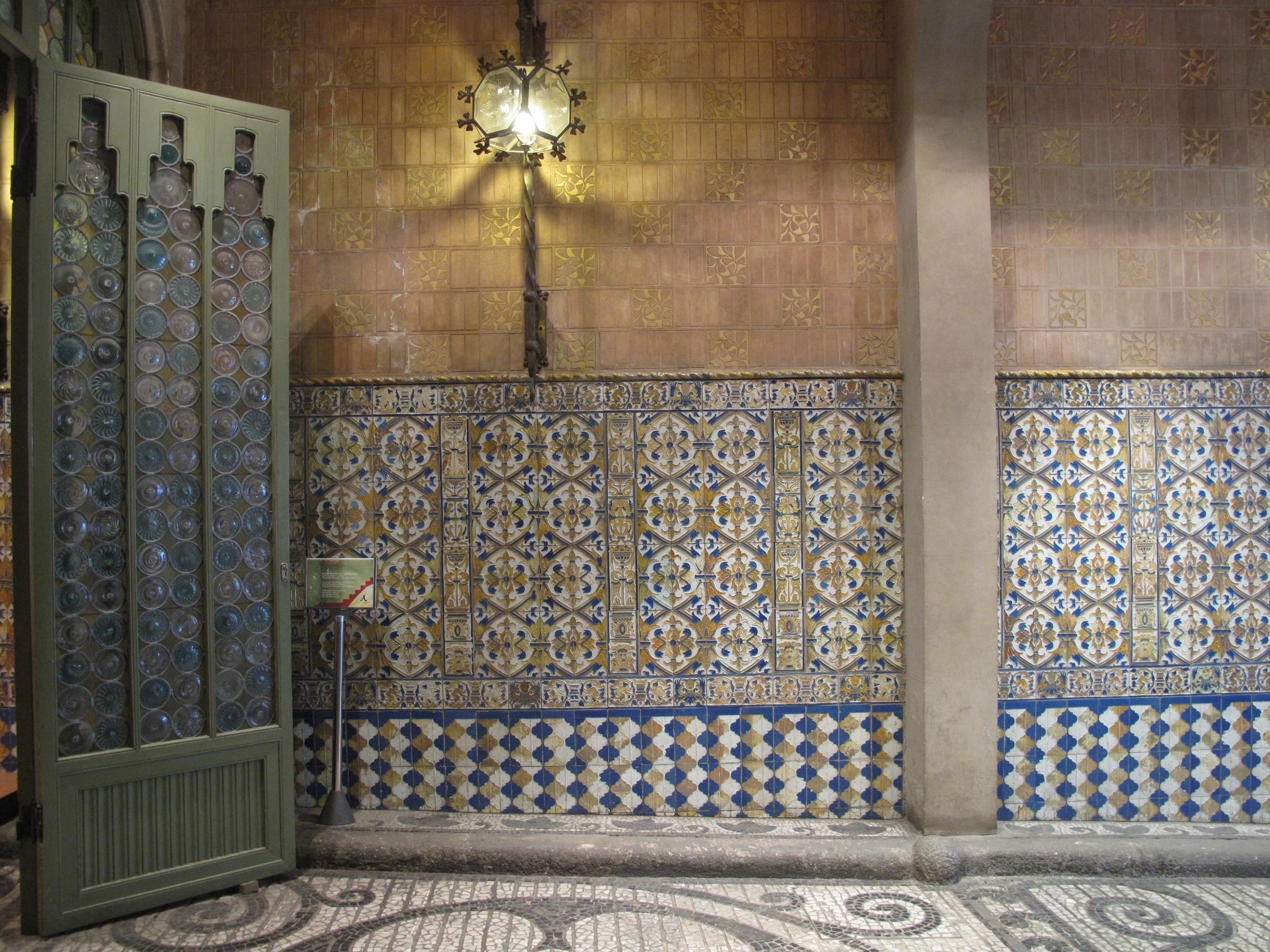
Foyer details.

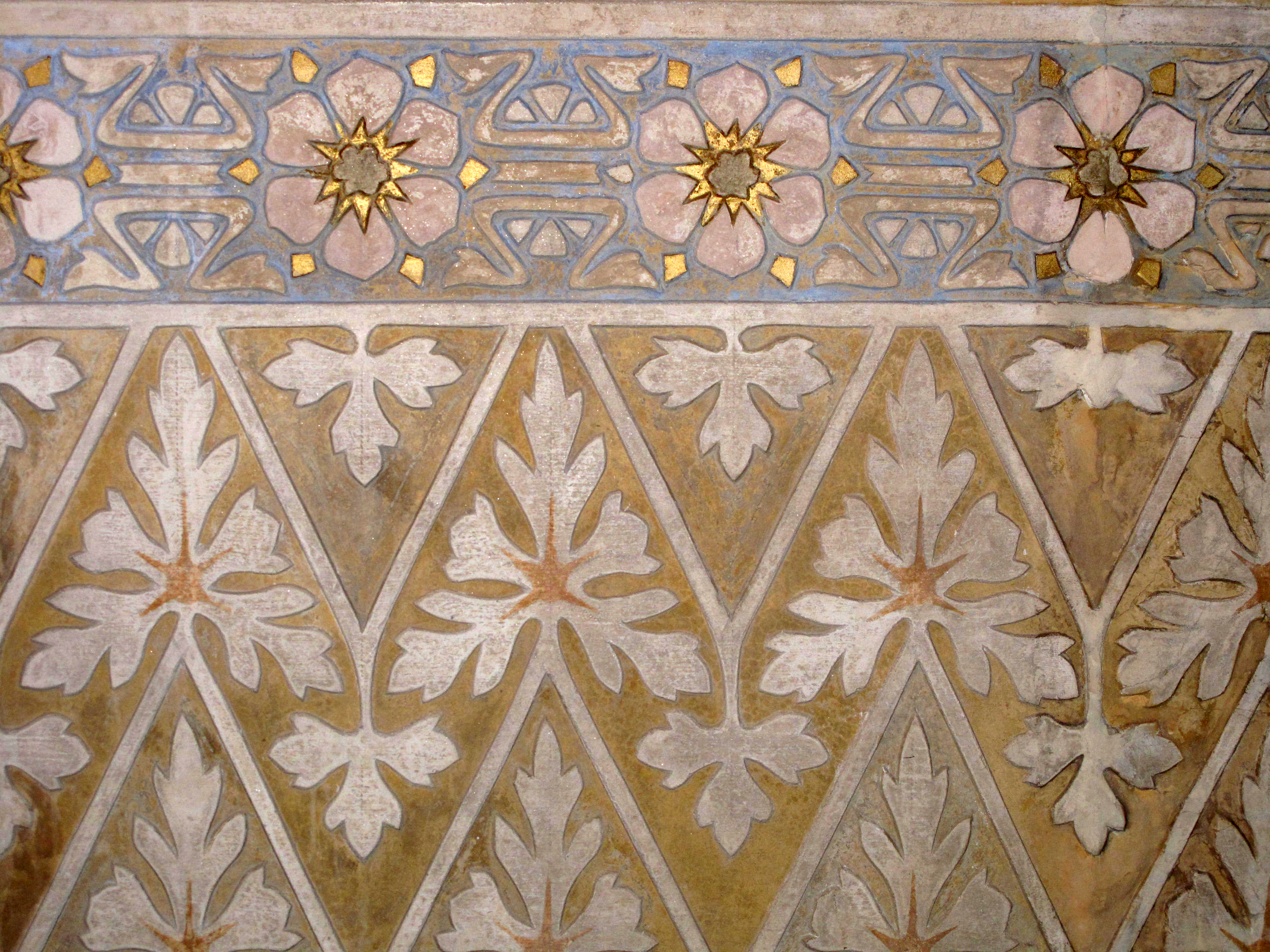
Floral arrangements on the wall.

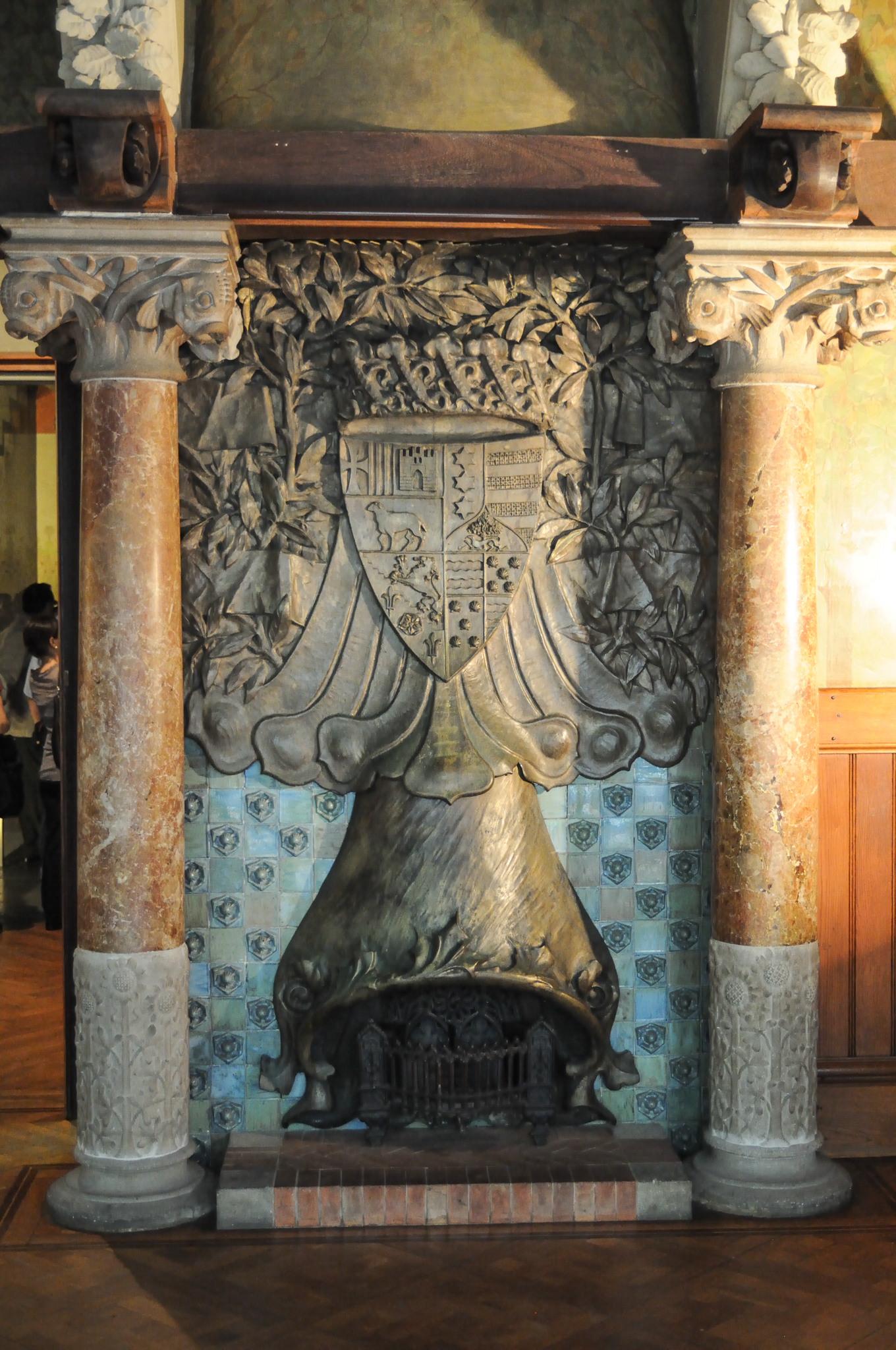
Rosselló room's chimney.

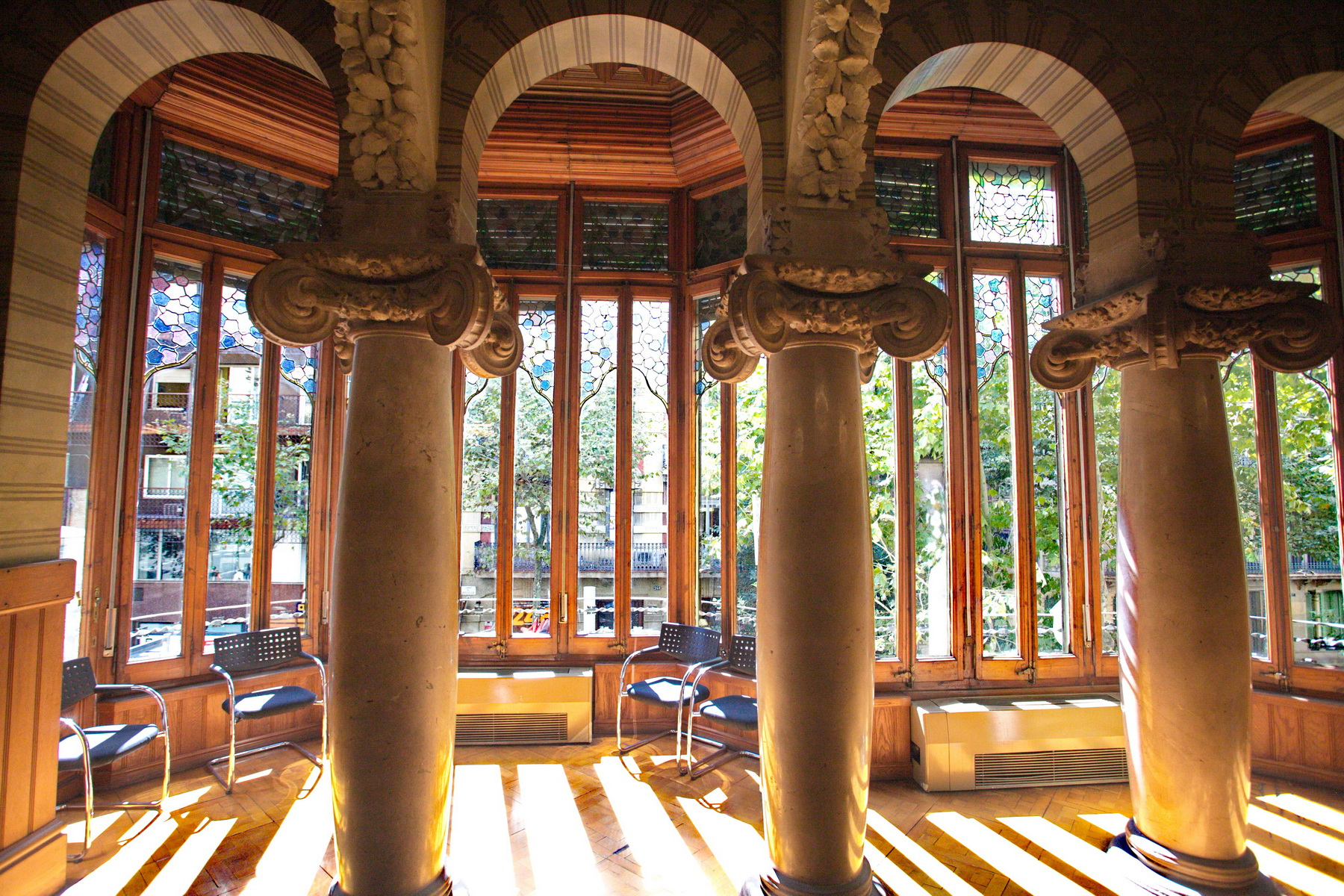
Rosselló room's columns.

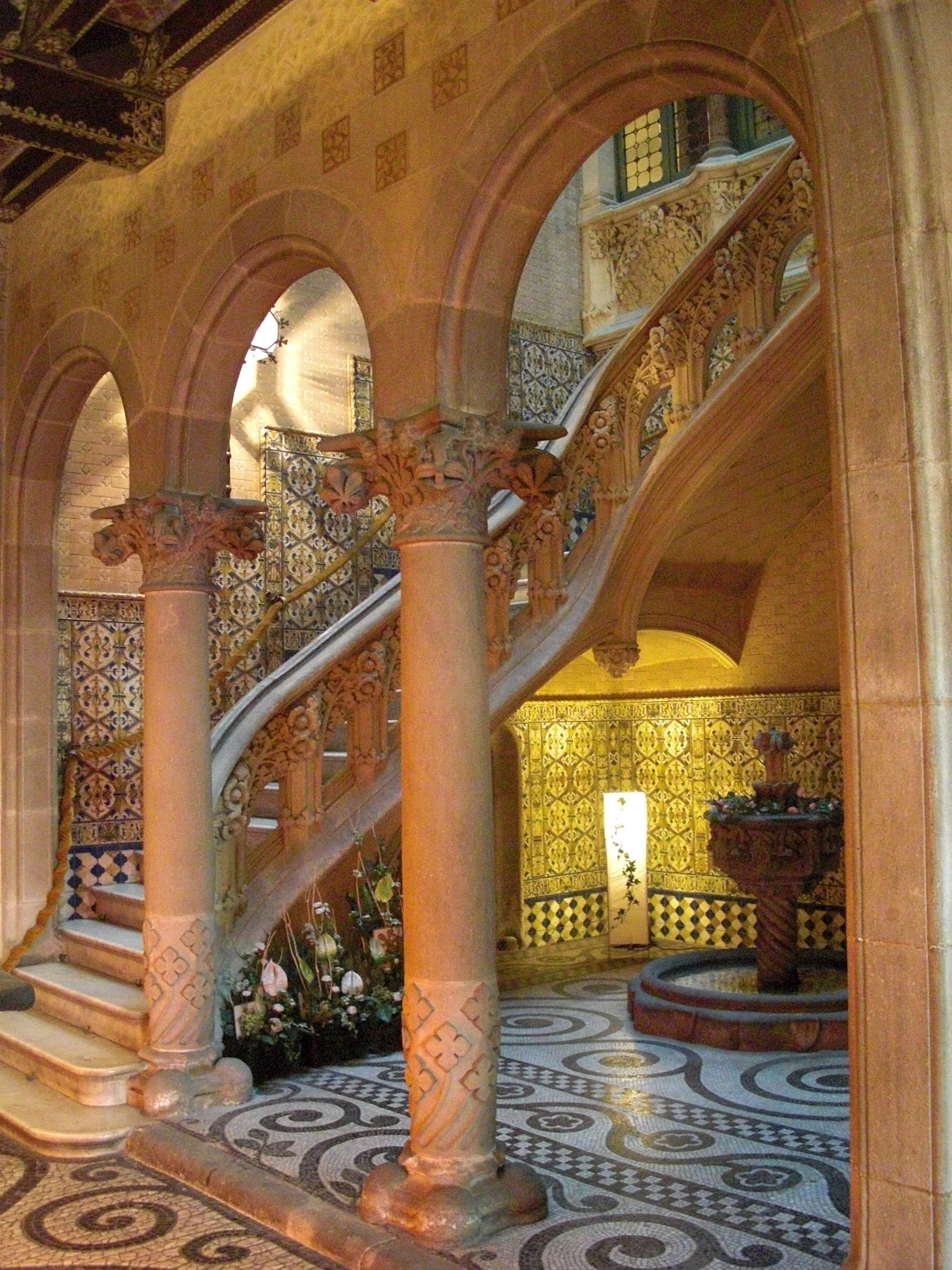
Patio with columns and stone fountain.

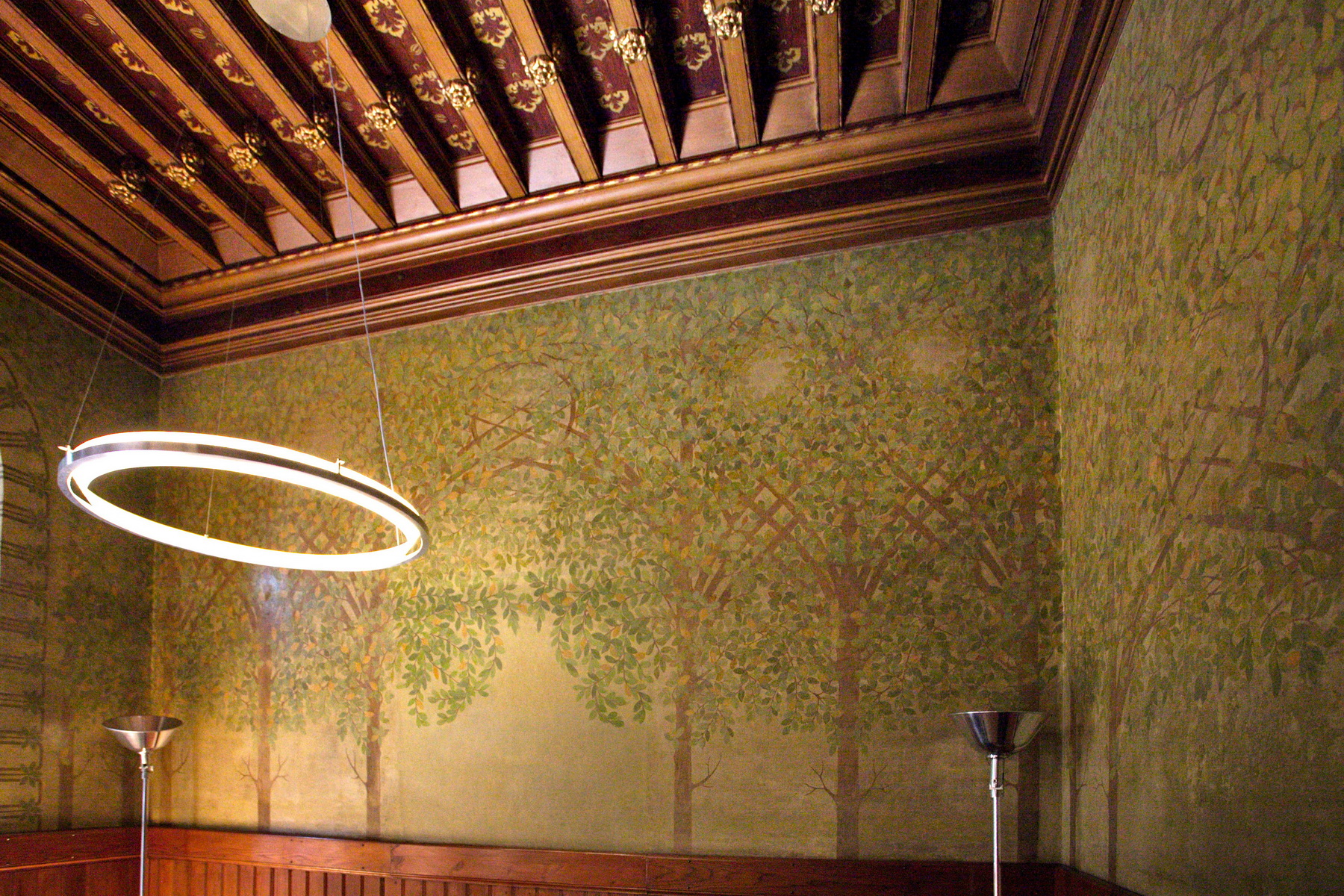
Wood ceiling and vegetable motifs on the walls of Rosselló room.

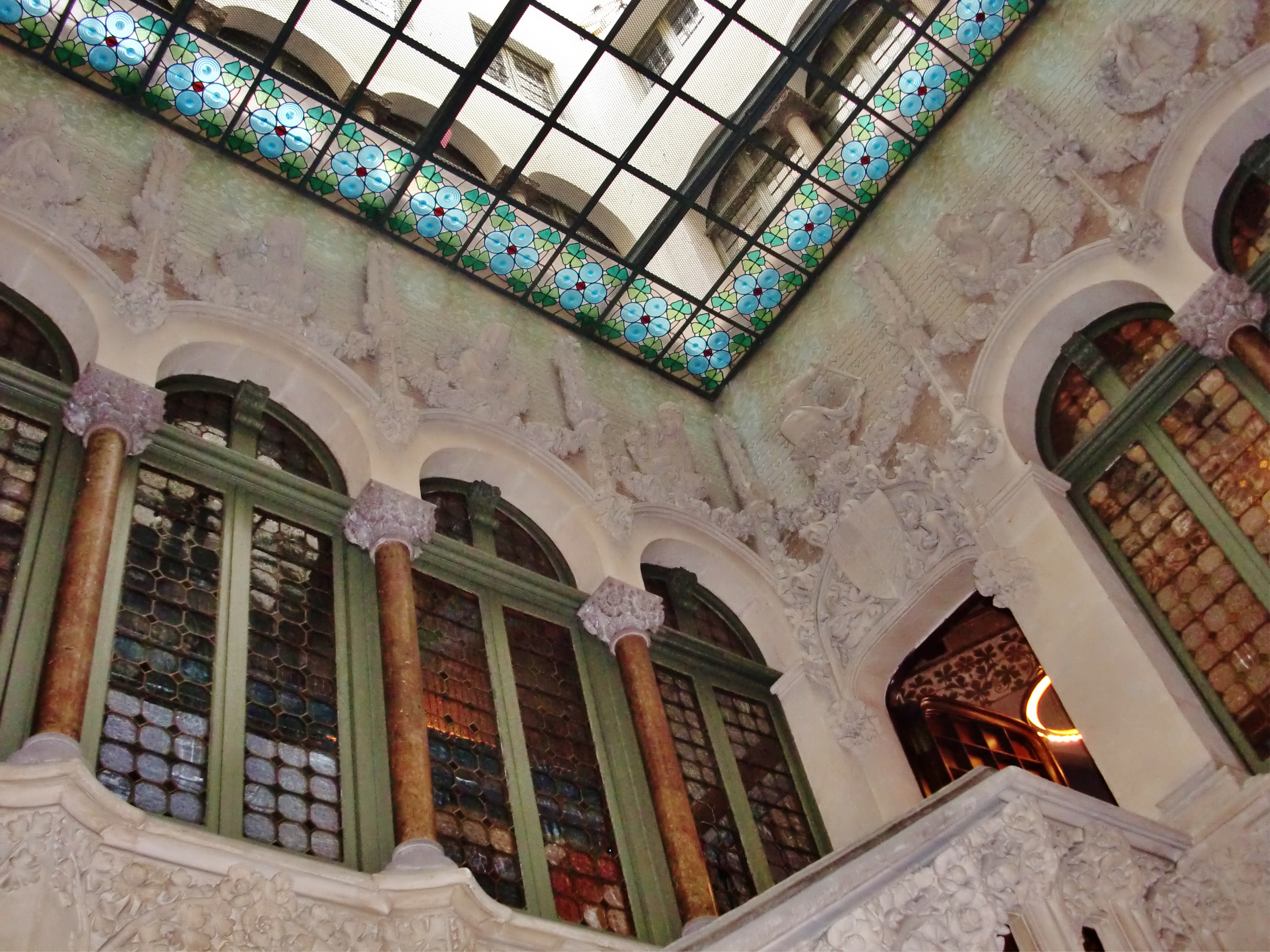
Detail of the stained glass window.

== See also ==
- Anexo:Bienes de interés cultural de la provincia de Barcelona
- Art Nouveau
- Modernisme
