= Teresa Colom i Pich =

Andorran author and poet

- Born: 12 December 1973 (age 52); La Seu d'Urgell

Teresa Colom i Pich (born 12 December 1973) is an Andorran author and poet. She won the Miquel Martí i Pol prize in 2000 and the Maria Àngels Anglada prize in 2016. She has published several collections of poetry, a collection of short stories, and a novel. Colom is the director of the Fundació Ramon Llull.

== Biography ==
Maria Teresa Colom i Pich was born in La Seu d'Urgell in 1973. She initially studied economics, graduating from Pompeu Fabra University, and went to work in a career in finance. Colom won a number of awards for her writing and left work to write full time. Colom won the Miquel Martí i Pol prize in 2000 and the Maria Àngels Anglada prize in 2016. The Anglada prize was awarded for her collection of five short stories, La senyoreta Keaton i altres bêsties, described as "half children's story, half Gothic horror". Colom's works have been translated into a number of languages including Spanish, French, Mandarin and Italian. In 2015 Colom was the curator of the Barcelona Poetry Week. Since 2022 Colom is the director of Fundació Ramon Llull, an organisation to promote the Catalan language and culture.

In 2019, Colom published her first novel, Consciència, a science fiction work set in a future where consciousness can survive death through preservation in computer systems.

In 2020, Colom's poem Eix featured in the thirty "Poets Under Pressure" series commissioned by Catalan newspaper El Nacional. Her short story, The Gravedigger's Son, was published in English by The Guardian for their 'Translation Tuesdays' series, translated by Mara Faye Lethem. The story was described as "Tim Burton crossed with the Brothers Grimm".

== Works ==
- Com mesos de juny, Edicions del Diari d'Andorra, 2001
- La temperatura d'uns llavis, Edicions del Diari d'Andorra, 2002
- Elegies del final conegut, Abadia Editors, 2005
- On tot és vidre, Pagès Editors, 2009
- La meva mare es preguntava per la mort, Pagès Editors, 2012
- La senyoreta Keaton i altres besties Empúries La Huerta Grande, 2015
- Consciència, Empúries, 2019
