= Ester Fenoll Garcia =

Andorran writer and poet (born 1967)

- Born: Ester Fenoll; 6 June 1967 (age 59); La Seu d'Urgell, Spain
- Education: University of Andorra, University of Barcelona
- Occupations: Poet, writer, civil servant

Ester Fenoll Garcia (born 6 June 1967 in La Seu d'Urgell, Spain) is a poet and writer, and a civil servant living in the Principality of Andorra.

== Biography ==
Ester Fenoll has a degree in Law, a postgraduate degree in Adult Guardianship from the University of Barcelona and a postgraduate degree in Andorran Law from the University of Andorra.

She began management of the Fundació Privada Tutelar in 2007, even as she was also the president and co-founder of the Association of Autism Affected People of the Principality of Andorra (Autea). She was also a member of the Federation of Andorran Disability Associations (FAAD). As a columnist, her work has appeared in the periodicals Foc i lloc of the Diari d'Andorra.

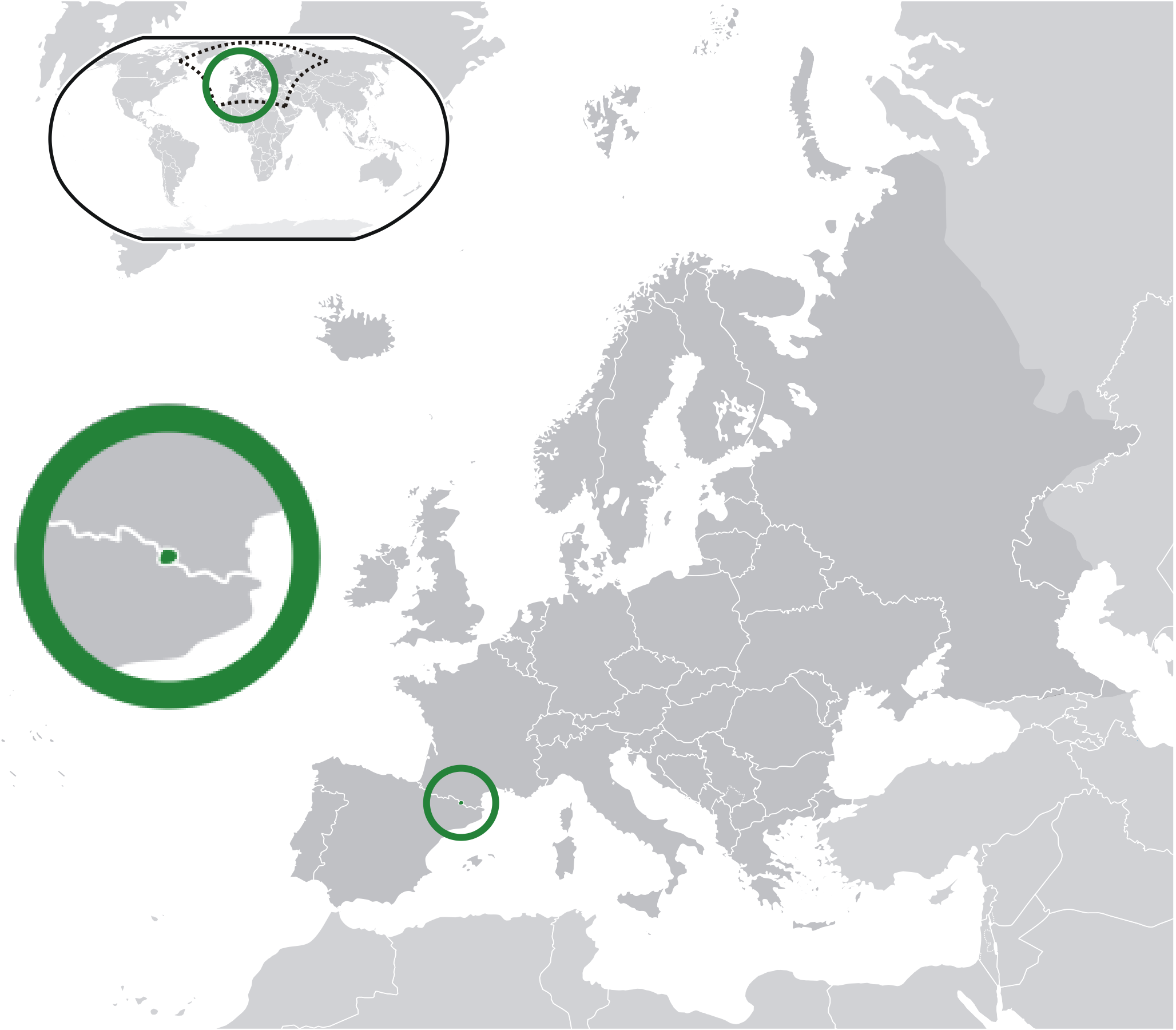
The Principality of Andorra is a microstate located in the Pyrenees mountains south of France and north of Spain.

Fenoll joined the Andorran government in 2011 with her appointment as a permanent member of the Health and Welfare Advisory Council. In April 2015, she moved on to become Secretary of State for Social Affairs of the Government of Andorra.

In May 2019, as the principality's Secretary of State for Social Affairs and Employment, Fenoll spoke at the Forum on Knowledge, Innovation and Sustainability, held in Madrid, Spain, organized by the Ibero-American Secretariat as well as the Andorran Embassy there. She spoke about Andorra's gender equality policies and details about a new law in Andorra on the rights of children and adolescents. Fenoll went on to discuss "Andorra's commitment to the inclusion of vulnerable people, especially people with disabilities, and defended the experience of the Network of Inclusive Companies."

On 10 July 2019, Fenoll was appointed the Secretary General of the Government and is sometimes referred to as Ester Fenoll Garcia in official correspondence.

== Selected publications ==
Fenoll's works can be found in Catalan and Spanish.

- "Esmorzar perfecte" (Perfect breakfast). (in Catalan) Andorra: Fundació Caixabank, 2006. ISBN 978-99920-15-98-8
- "Anticipant octubre" (Anticipating October). (in Catalan) Tarragona: Arola, 2008. ISBN 978-84-924083-7-5
- Agradezco tu amor pero tengo otros planes (I appreciate your love but I have other plans). (in Spanish) Andorra: Aloma, 2011. ISBN 978-99920-66-01-0

Fenoll also collaborated with other authors to produce the book, Autism, let's break the silence with poetry. Vienna Editions. March 2014

== Awards ==
- First prize in the 6th edition of the Miquel Martí i Pol Poetry Competition awarded by the Government of Andorra
- Finalist of the 6th Short Poetry Competition of the Polytechnic University of Catalonia, 2004
- 28th edition of the Grandalla Poetry Prize 2005, with Perfect Breakfast
