= Marta Repullo i Grau =

Andorran writer and poet (born 1976)

Marta Repullo i Grau (born 1976) is an Andorran writer, working in the Catalan language. She has published three novels, the first in Colombia, a poetry collection and several short stories. Repullo has been awarded the Premi de narrativa curta del Consell Comarcal de l'Alt Urgell, the Premi Recull del Concurs de Poesia de la Biblioteca Pública del Govern d'Andorra, and the Mallorca Prize.

== Life ==
Born in Barcelona, Repullo soon moved to La Seu d'Urgell. She received her degree from the Autonomous University of Barcelona. She also holds a PhD in political science from the University of Los Andes in Colombia.

A journalist by profession, during her career, she has worked with various media organizations throughout the Pyrenees; among these are Ràdio Seu, Ona Andorra, and El Periòdic d'Andorra. She has also developed her career in the arena of international cultural management and cooperation. Her writing career began early; at the age of fourteen she won second prize for her writing in a contest sponsored by the Generalitat de Catalunya. In 2001, she released Carícies de la lletra, a volume of poetry. Her work in shorter forms has won a number of prizes.

Her first novel, El Cuerpo, was published in Bogota by Uniediciones in 2019. In 2020 the publishing house Rosa dels Vents published Repullo's novel La música que sona quan acaba la cançó, about three generations of women from Cadí, "where music still sounds among the mountains".

Her third novel Deixa'm anar, published in 2024 by Galés edicions in València, was recognized with the Mallorca Prize.

== Awards ==
Among her awards are the Premi de narrativa curta del Consell Comarcal de l'Alt Urgell, which she received in 2000, and the Premi Recull del Concurs de Poesia de la Biblioteca Pública del Govern d'Andorra, which she won in 2001. She was awarded the Mallorce Prize in 2024.
