= Institut Ramon Llull =

Catalan language and culture promotion organisation

The Institut Ramon Llull (English: Ramon Llull Institute) is a consortium consisting of the Generalitat de Catalunya (Catalan Government), the Govern de les Illes Balears (Government of the Balearic Islands) and the Ajuntament de Barcelona (Barcelona City Council). Its purpose is to project and disseminate abroad Catalan language and culture in all of its forms of expression. To do this, the Institut Ramon Llull provides support for external relations in the cultural ambit of its member organisations.

== History ==
The Generalitat de Catalunya (Catalan Government) and the Autonomous Community of the Balearic created the Institut Ramon Llull (IRL) via an agreement signed on 5 April 2002, which was published in Resolution PRE/1128/2002, of 30 April. The objective was to create a mechanism for promoting the Catalan language, the culture that it expresses and all other cultural production (not only linguistic) from Catalonia and the Balearic Islands. It is also a mechanism for consolidating and strengthening relations among the various territories that share the language. The IRL has the legal status of a consortium comprising the two aforementioned public administrations. The State government announced that it would provide support through the Instituto Cervantes. The board of the IRL was created on 3 June 2002 and consisted of the following 21 intellectuals representing the Catalan language, arts and culture: Antoni Badia i Margarit, Joaquim Molas, Miquel Batllori, Baltasar Porcel, Sergi Belbel, Carme Riera, Josep Joan Bigas i Luna, Martí de Riquer, Maria del Mar Bonet, Xavier Rubert de Ventós, Anthony Bonner, Sebastià Serrano, Josep Carreras i Coll, Antoni Tàpies, Pere Gimferrer, Josep Termes, Isidor Marí i Mayans, Joan Triadú, Josep Massot i Muntaner, Marie Claire Zimmermann and Joan Francesc Mira. In addition, Joan Maria Pujals was appointed as the institute's first director.

=== Early years ===
Between 23 June and 4 July 2003, Maria del Mar Bonet, the Nats Nus dance company, the artist Eulàlia Valldosera, the pianist Albert Atenelle, and the exhibition Gaudí, un univers acted as ambassadors of Catalan culture in Russia. where Gaudí was the focus of a seminar. A year later, in 2004, the IRL played a key role in the most important book fair in Latin America. Between 27 November and 5 December 2004, the IRL was guest of honor at the Feria del Libro de Guadalajara, which featured more than 100 events, including, notably, a retrospective of the work of Antoni Tàpies in the Museo de Arte de Zapopán.

In 2005, the IRL organized Veles e vents. Cultura Catalana a Nàpols, an exhibition on The Divine Comedy as interpreted by Miquel Barceló and held in the Castel Nuovo, during October. It was also the setting for concerts by Carles Santos and Raimon, as well as performances by'Àngels Margarit, Roger Bernat and Pep Tosar.

In 2006, in New York the IRL organised a series of cultural events, including an exhibition by the photographer Joan Fontcuberta, a season of films by Isabel Coixet and Marc Recha, with the critic Romà Gubern, and a poetry symposium involving various poets and the critic Harold Bloom.

=== Frankfurt Book Fair ===
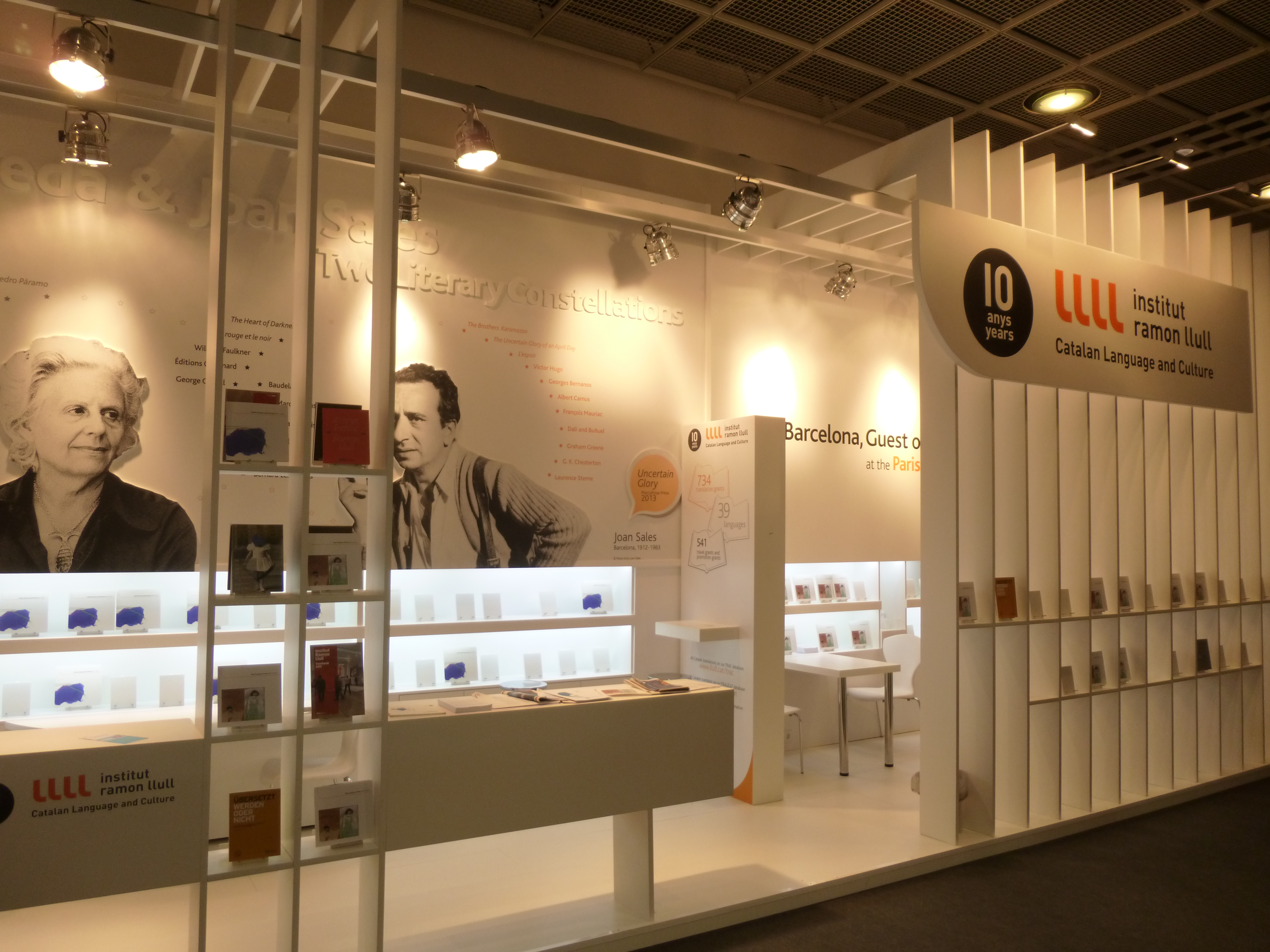
Stand at the Frankfurt fair in 2012

A milestone in the institute's history was getting Catalan culture to be the guest of honour at the 2007 Frankfurt Book Fair. It was attended by 118 writers, 237 organisations and 5,719 people linked to the Catalan cultural scene; 95 events were held and 53 literary works were translated from Catalan into German. Highlights among the events included the adaptation of Tirant lo Blanc directed by Calixto Bieito, the Dance: meeting Catalan Culture cycle, the exhibitions Cultura Catalana, Singular i Universal and VisualKultur.cat, the Dies de l'Òpera Catalana (Catalan Opera Days) and Sónar Nits. All this was run in collaboration with the government of Andorra and the Spanish Cervantes Institute.

A year later, in 2008, the institute was present at the Festival Internacional Cervantino, in Guanajuato, Mexico. The Catalan and Balearic presence featured Joan Manuel Serrat, Jordi Savall, Hespèrion XXI and the Capella Reial de Catalunya (performing together with Tembembé Ensemble Continuo), an exhibition of the work of Agustí Centelles and the "Dansa de la Mort" of Verges. Catalan Days was also repeated in New York, with jazz, theatre and dance performance, a cinema cycle entitled Clandestí, forbidden Catalan Cinema under Franco and, as part of the PEN World Voices Festival, a homage to Blai Bonet.

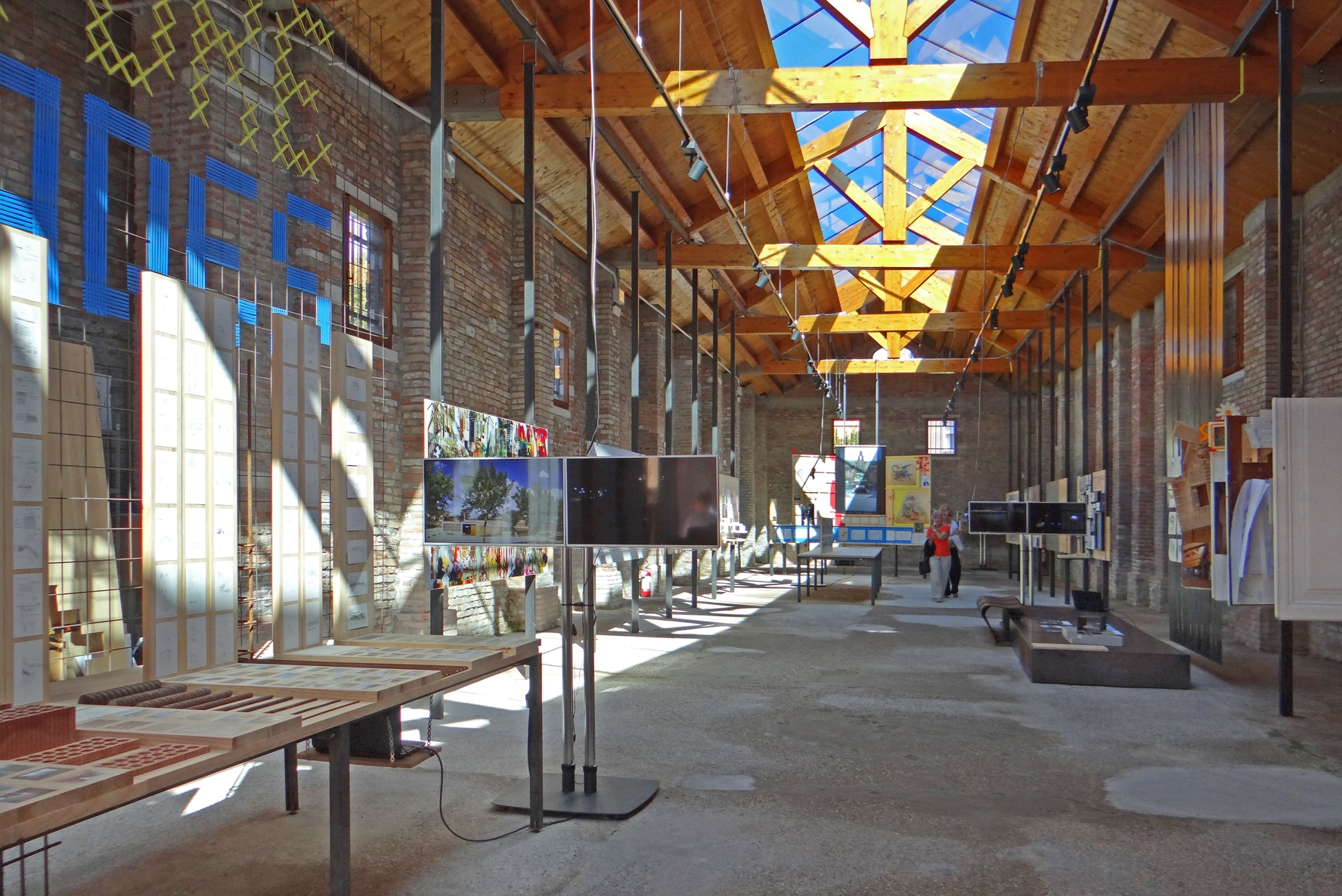
Catalonia Pavilion at the 2014 Venice Biennale

In 2009 it took part in the Venice Biennale for the first time. As part of the Eventi Collateralli, the 53rd Biennale included a Catalan pavilion, with the exhibition La comunitat inconfessable curate by Valentín Roma, which was visited by 45,633 people. Several events were held alongside this, including the academic symposium Les ciutats inconfessables.

=== 2010–2015 ===
Between 3 and 6 February 2010, under the slogan, Le Catalan, la langue de 10 millions d'Européens, the Institut Ramon Llull took Catalan culture to the heart of the French capital in an exhibition dedicated to languages and teaching that received 227,863 visitors and had 200 exhibitors from 30 countries. The IRL's participation was the result of the combined efforts of Catalan, Balearic and Valencian institutions and organisations. A year later, Catalan culture arrived in London with the exhibition Joan Miró: The Ladder of Escape at the Tate Modern as the highlight. It was accompanied by performance from Tap Olé, Nats Nus Dansa, Sol Picó, concerts by the Carles Benavent Quintet, the Miguel Gómez Quartet, Colia Miralta Sambeat, the Biel Ballester Trio, Mishima, and Les Aus i Aias, among other events. The IRL also managed to have a presence at the World Puppet Theatre Festival in Charleville.

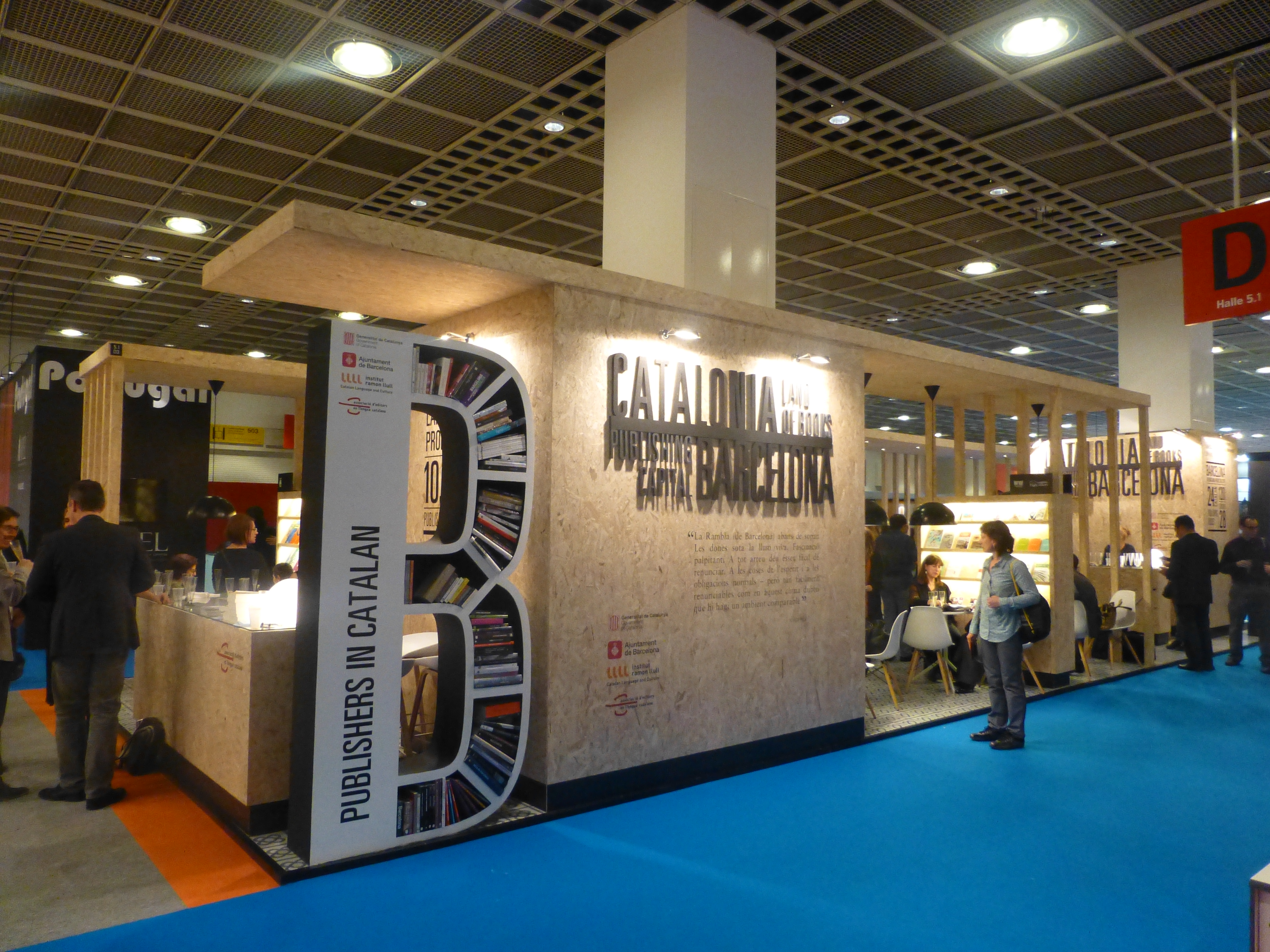
Fira de Frankfurt 2015

In 2012 a tour was organised, named Catalan Sounds on Tour, which visited Canada, Texas, Mexico and the United Kingdom – an initiative hosted at the Canadian Music Week (Toronto), at South by South West (Austin), at The Great Escape (Brighton) and at Vive Latino (Mexico City), joined by groups such as Manel, Seward, Mujeres, Ninette & The Goldfish, Els Amics del Bosc, Ferguson or Petit, among others. That same year, Avignon à la Catalane was celebrated, with eight theatre companies from Catalonia and the Balearic Islands in attendance at Avignon's OFF Theatre Festival, one of the most important in the world. The companies Pelmànec, EIA, Pere Faura, Alba Sarraute, Los Excéntricos, Cor de théatre, Katraska i Mariantònia Oliver performed in various spaces throughout the city. Furthermore, there began to be a Catalan presence at the Venice Biennale of Architecture. For the first time, Catalonia and the Balearic Islands enjoyed their own pavilion in this event which was connected with the Art Biennale. Between 29 August and 25 November, within the scope of Eventi Collateralli (peripheral events), it was also possible to visit the project Vogadors (Rowers), commissioned by Jordi Badia and Félix Arranz.

Among the projects initiated by the IRL in 2013, one which stood out the most was the participation of Barcelona as a city invited to the Paris Book Fair, with the participation of more than twenty authors who presented recent translations into French; in the field of visual arts, of particular note was the participation of the IRL, with their own pavilion, at the Venice Biennale of Art with a projected named 25% by Francesc Torres and Mercedes Alvarez and commissioned by Jordi Balló. Others were the focus on Catalan at the Festival of Contemporary Music in Huddersfield, one of Europe's most prestigious, complete with the figure of Hèctor Parra as resident composer, and also the fact that the Catalan culture was the guest of honour at Salisbury International Arts Festival, with the attendance of fifteen theatre companies and music groups.

The main projects in 2014 were the Arquitectures empeltades / Grafting Architecture. Catalonia at Venice exhibition in the Venice Biennale of Architecture; the participation of Barcelona in the Beijing Design Week (BJDW); the multidisciplinary programme of Barcelona as a guest in the Stockholm Kulturfestival (the two last projects, in collaboration with the Barcelona city council); Voices from Catalonia, the focus of Catalan literature in the Gothenburg Book Fair (Sweden); and the remarkable collection of translations of works originally written in Catalan to other languages.

In 2015, because of the regional elections in May, the new Balearic government requested its reincorporation into the governing bodies of the IRL. Regarding the internationalisation of the Catalan literature, a good level of translations was maintained with 134 publications and a focus on Catalan was celebrated in the International Festival of Authors in Toronto. As far as creation is concerned, Catalonia's fourth consecutive participation in the Venice Biennale of Architecture with the project La singularitat, by Albert Serra and commissioned by Chus Martínez, was remarkable. The participations of Catalan groups and companies have also had a special relevance in the New York City Summerstage Festival or at the Avignon le Off Festival with the project Avignon à la catalane, as well as the presence of our design in the Business of Design Week in Hong Kong with the Barcelona city council. Catalan teaching also started in the University of São Paulo (Brazil) and in the Beijing Foreign Studies University. This rounded the number of universities in the University Network of Catalan Studies Abroad to 150.

In 2017 it took part of the Venice Biennale of Architecture with Aftermath_Catalonia in Venice. Architecture beyond architects, commissioned by Jaume Prat, Jelena Proklopevic with a project by the director Isaki Lacuesta, the participation of the Catalan literature as a special guest in the Warsaw Book Fair, the organisation of the international activities for the 700th anniversary of Llull's death and the celebration of the 30th International Symposium for Catalan teachers abroad in the Rovira i Virgili University.

The Catalan-Balearic presence was a highlight in 2017 as a guest of honour in the Bologna Children Book Fair, the participation of the Momix Festival for children drama (Kingersheim-Alsace), with a programme including Catalan and Balearic companies. Another great Project for 2017 was the participation of Barcelona as a guest in the Buenos Aires Biennale of Architecture, in collaboration with the Barcelona City Council once again, and a plan for artistic residencies.

== Government role ==
Signature of the Balearic Islands’ return to the Institut Ramon Llull, November 2015

The autonomous government of the Balearic Islands has withdrawn from the institute several times. It was a co-founder of the body in 2002, together with the Generalitat, the autonomous government of Catalonia. On 25 June 2004, the Balearic government decided to leave the institute. Consequently, on 26 April 2005, the Generalitat passed new statutes for the consortium, which were published in the DOGC, its official journal, by Resolution CLT/1940/2005 of 6 June 2005. At this time the institute was made up of the Generalitat and the Institute for Catalan Studies. The Balearic government set up the Institut d'Estudis Baleàrics (Institute for Balearic Studies), with very similar functions to those of the Llull. On 16 May 2008, the Balearic Islands autonomous region decide to rejoin the Institut Ramon Llull. On 9 September 2008 an agreement was signed between the Catalan and Balearic governments to change the statutes of the institute, bringing the Balearic Islands back into the body, approving the above-mentioned statutes. During this period the institution came under both governments and had one headquarters in Barcelona and another in Palma, located at number 10 on the Carrer de la Protectora. The Generalitat signed another agreement with the government of Andorra in 2008 to set up the Ramon Llull Foundation, an independent institution in which the Institut Ramon Llull has a role, based in Andorra.

Several years later, on 7 December 2012, the Balearic government again decided to leave the consortium. The board of management of the Institut Ramon Llull, meeting on 12 December 2012, decided to implement the departure of the Balearic government on 31 December 2012. As Barcelona city council wanted to join the institute, the board decided at the same meeting to alter the statutes of the consortium to allow the city council to become a member. The council also joined the Ramon Llull Foundation. In summer 2015, the Balearic government asked to rejoin the institution, and this officially took place on 20 May 2016.

=== Participating institutions ===
Institut Ramon Llull	Government of Catalonia
Institut Ramon Llull	Balearic government
Institut Ramon Llull	Barcelona city council
Ramon Llull Foundation	Government of Catalonia
Ramon Llull Foundation	Government of Andorra
Ramon Llull Foundation	Barcelona City Council

== Headquarters and delegations ==
Since 2013, the current headquarters of the Ramon Llull Institute has been at the Palau Baró de Quadras, a modernist building constructed by Josep Puig i Cadafalch between 1904 and 1906. Situated at 373, Avinguda Diagonal, Barcelona, it is the property of Barcelona City Council, who allowed its use as soon as the Institute entered the organs of government.

The Baron of Quadras entrusted the construction of his new house in Barcelona to Puig i Cadafalch in the year 1900, after having finished his palace in Massanes. The building is located on a narrow plot of land, on the corner of Avinguda Diagonal and Carrer de Rosselló, with two completely different façades. It is the result of the renovation of a previous rental property on the site, whose façade faced Carrer Rosselló – some elements of the pre-existing structure are still visible. The ground floor and the first floor housed the residence of the Baron of Quadras, allowing the rest of the rooms to be rented. Thus, the building's most important elements are the façade on Diagonal and the decorative interior of the Baron's residence. The building is currently open to guided tours on Wednesdays and Saturdays.

The building has been the seat of various institutions such as the Music Museum of Barcelona and Casa Asia. It has been home to the IRL since 2013. Previously, the institute was located on the basement floor of 279, Carrer Diputació, also in Barcelona. While the Government of the Balearic Islands had representation in the institute, the IRL also had an office in Palma – firstly at 29, Carrer Capità Salom, and afterwards at 10, Carrer la Protectora. Currently, it has no office in Palma.

Furthermore, the Ramon Llull Institute has offices in Berlin, London, New York City and Paris.

== Aims ==
The Institut Ramon Llull is a public body set up with the aim of encouraging the academic study of Catalan language and culture abroad, the translation of literature and thought written in Catalan and Catalan cultural output in other spheres like theatre, cinema, circus, dance, music, the visual arts, design and architecture.

To this end, the institute enters into agreements with universities abroad to encourage the teaching of Catalan studies there, offering support to institutions all over the world where this is taught. Alongside this, it supports international Catalan studies associations and backs advanced studies and linguistics research at top universities. As an official body certifying Catalan language knowledge abroad, it organises examinations to accredit the different levels, according to the Common European Framework of Reference for Languages.

In another sphere of action, the Institut Ramon Llull supports the translation of literature and thought written in Catalan, by assisting both translators and publishers in other languages who release them. It facilitates dialogue and exchanges between essayists and researchers in Catalan and their counterparts in other languages, likewise helping to raise the profile of journals of thought and culture in Catalan by promoting exchanges with other countries.

Finally, the Institut Ramon Llull concerns itself with disseminating Catalan literature as a whole at book fairs and assuring the presence of artists from Catalonia on important international creative contemporary arts programmes. It works to ensure that Catalan culture is present at festivals and fairs at global level; it takes part in cultural events in strategic cities at the forefront in different creative spheres, and it encourages exchanges between local and international creative sectors with visits for foreign curators, critics, programmers, publishers and agents to festivals, exhibitions, premieres, concerts and talks in Catalonia.
