= Albert Salvadó =

Andorran writer (1951–2020)

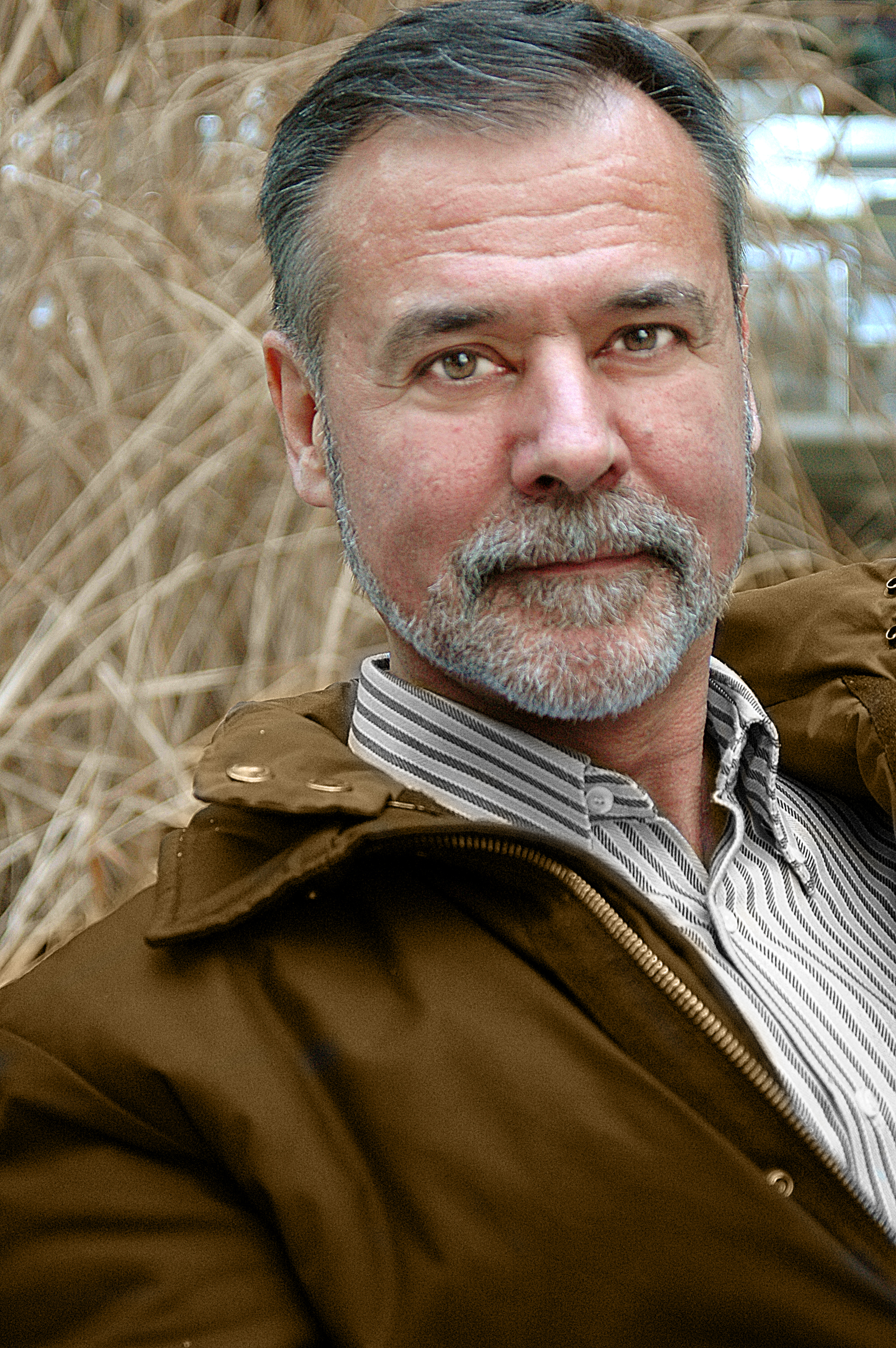
Albert Salvadó

Albert Salvadó i Miras (1 February 1951 – 3 December 2020) was an Andorran writer and industrial engineer. He wrote children's stories, essays and novels, in both Catalan and Spanish. He was Minister of Culture of Andorra la Vella from 2003 until 2007.

== Life ==
Salvadó was born on 1 February 1951. He was an industrial engineer. Salvadó was Minister of Culture of Andorra la Vella from 2003 until 2007. He died on 3 December 2020, aged 69. He was a member of the Association of Catalan Language Writers.

== Works ==
In the crime fiction genre, he has written El rapte, el mort i el Marsellès (Serie Negra Prize 2000), and Una vida en joc, dedicated to the former Casino de la Rabassada (1910).

In the suspense novel genre, he has written Un vot per l'esperança, a novel that won the title of "Selected Work" in the Plaza & Janés International Novel Prize in 1985, and L'informe Phaeton. In historical fiction he has written books set in different eras: The Teacher of Cheops (Néstor Luján Prize Historical Novel 1998); L'anell d'Àtila (Fiter i Rossell Prize 1999); Els ulls d'Anníbal (Charlemagne Prize 2002); La Gran Concubina d'Egipte (Nestor Lujan Prize 2005); the trilogy dedicated to James I the Conqueror (2000s) comprising: El punyal del sarraí, La reina hongaresa and Parleu o mateu-me; the trilogy dedicated to Ali Bey comprising: Maleït català, Maleït musulmà and Maleït cristià; and Obre els ulls i desperta, set in 17th-century Prague.

Salvadó's work has been translated into Spanish, Catalan, French, English, Portuguese, Greek, Czech and Slovak.

== Bibliography ==
- 1997: L’enigma de Constantí el Gran
- 1998: El mestre de Kheops (The Teacher of Cheops, trans. Marc Duckett, 2017)
- 1999: L’Anell d’Atila
- 2000: El rapte, el mort i el marsellès
- 2000–01: Jaime I el Conquistador series
  - El punyal del sarraí
  - La reina hongaresa
  - Parleu o mateu-me
- 2001: L’ull del diable
- 2001: El relat de Gunter Psarris
- 2002: Un vot per l'esperança
- 2002: Els ulls d’Anníbal
- 2004: L’ombra d’Alí Bei series
  - Maleït català!, translated as The Mysterious Balloon Man (2011)
  - Maleït musulmà!
  - Maleït cristià!
- 2006: La gran concubina d’Amon
- 2007: L’informe Phaeton
- 2010: Una vida en joc
- 2011: Obre els ulls i desperta
- 2016: El ball de la vida co-author Anna Tohà
- 2018: Vols viure?

== Awards ==
- 1982 - Premi Xerric-Xerrac de contes infantils for La imaginació del nen
- 1985 - Obra seleccionada per al premi Plaza & Janés for Libertad para Satanás
- 1997 - Finalista del Premi Nèstor Luján de novel·la històrica for L'Enigma de Constantí el Gran
- 1998 - Premi Nèstor Luján de novel·la històrica for The teacher of Cheops
- 1999 - Premi Fiter i Rossell for L'anell d'Àtila
- 2000 - Premi Sèrie Negra de Planeta for El rapte, el mort i el marsellès
- 2002 - Premi Carlemany for Els Ulls d'Anníbal
- 2005 - Premi Nèstor Luján de novel·la històrica for La Gran concubina de Amon
- 2016 - Premi Internacional El Vi Fa Sang for his body of work
- 2018 - Premi Àgora Cultural del Principat d'Andorra 2017 for his contribution to the enrichment of the literature from Andorra, particularly in the domain of the Historical Novel
