= Mary Ann Newman =

Translator from Catalan

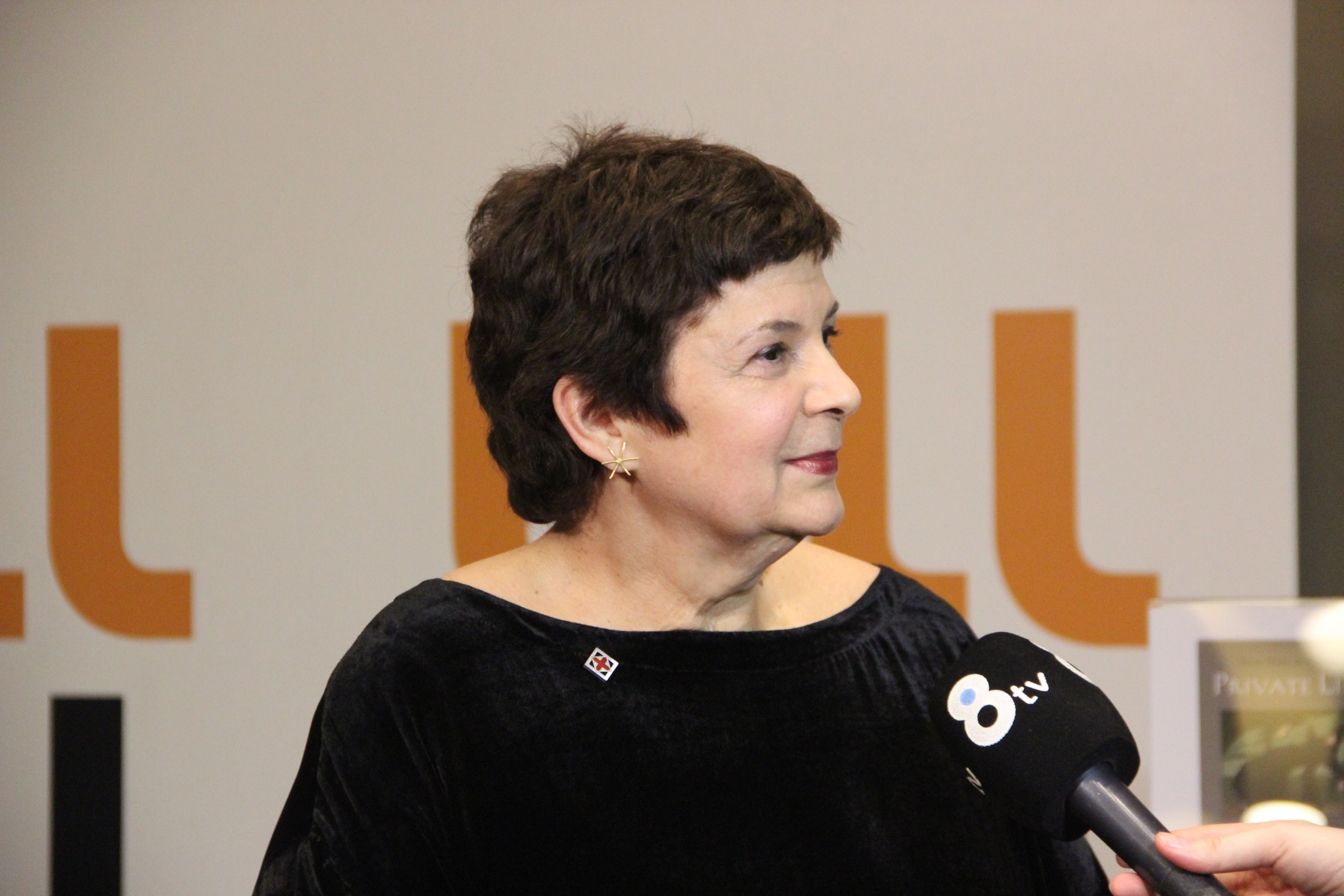
Mary Ann Newman in 2014.

Mary Ann Newman is the director of the Farragut Fund for Catalan Culture in the US. She is a translator, editor, and occasional writer on Catalan culture. She has translated a novel and a short story collection by Quim Monzó, essays by Xavier Rubert de Ventós, and a collection of poems by Josep Carner.

She graduated from New York University's Washington Square College in 1976 with a Bachelor of Arts degree. In 1985, she graduated with a doctorate from New York University. As of 2019, her latest translation is Private Life by Josep Maria de Sagarra, published by Archipelago Books.

She was awarded the Creu de Sant Jordi, and with the Ramon Llull International award (2022)
