= Miquel Martí i Pol =

Catalan poet and translator

Miquel Martí i Pol (Catalan pronunciation: [miˈkɛl məɾˈti j ˈpɔl]; 19 March 1929 – 11 November 2003) was one of the most popular and widely-read Catalan poets of the twentieth century, publishing more than 1,500 poems.

== Biography ==
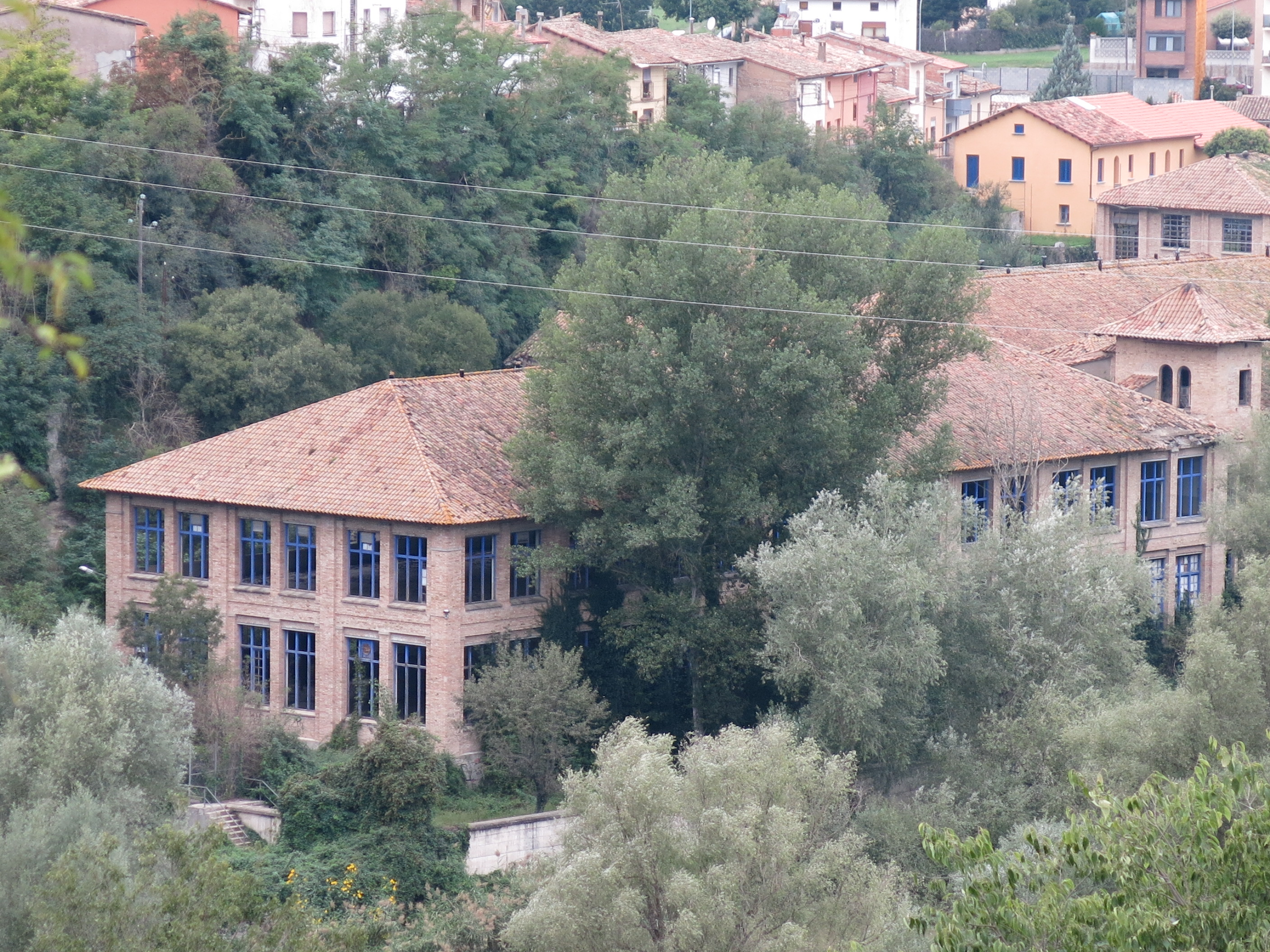
The factory where Martí i Pol worked for 30 years in the foreground. His town, Roda de Ter, in the background.

At the age of 14, Martí i Pol started work in the office of a textile factory. He published his first poetry when he was only 15. Based on his experience in the factory, he wrote in 1959 a collection of poems called La fàbrica (the Factory). However, they were to remain unpublished until 1970 as his family were afraid that their publication might cause him to lose his job. He worked at the factory until 1973, when at the age of 43 the multiple sclerosis he had contracted forced him to quit.

Martí i Pol spent his whole life in the town of his birth, Roda de Ter. He was committed to the people of the town and factory and also to the social class to which they belonged. He wrote: “I want to speak of them/in speaking of people today/ I want to speak of them. Without them, I do not exist.” However, in his best-selling collection of poems (over 100,000 copies sold) entitled Estimada Marta (Dear Marta), he showed that he could also poeticize an amorous and erotic relationship between a man and woman. In his later work, he explored the recurring themes of love, desire and death.

Martí i Pol was married twice and had two children from his first marriage.

== Main works ==
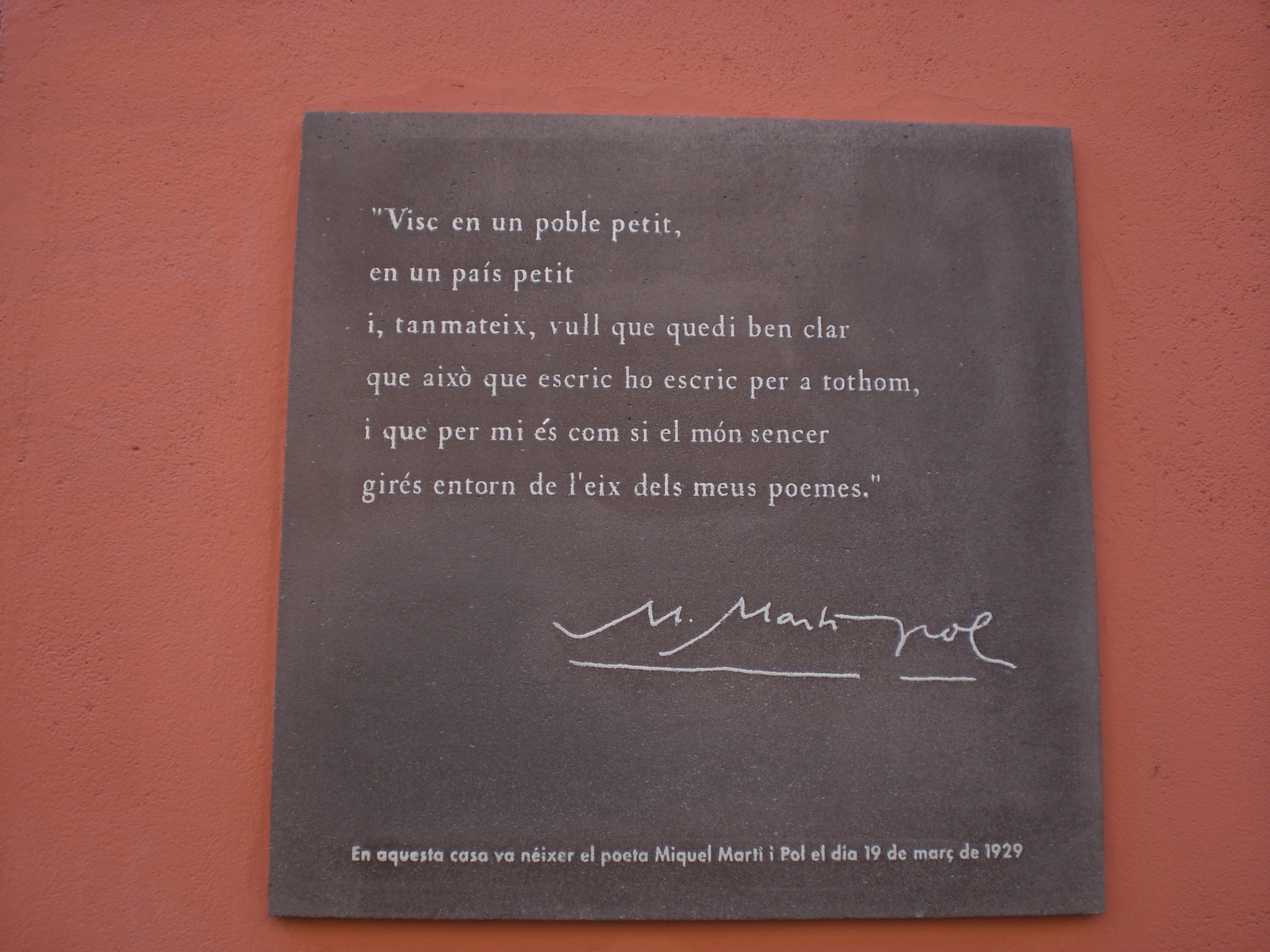
Poem on the wall of the birthplace of Miquel Martí i Pol

Some of his main works are:

- 1954: Paraules al vent
- 1966: El poble
- 1972: La fàbrica
- 1972: Vint-i-set poemes en tres temps
- 1975: L'arrel i l'escorça
- 1976: El llarg viatge
- 1977: Amb vidres a la sang
- 1978: Estimada Marta
- 1991: Suite de Parlavà
- 2002: Després de tot

== Translator ==
Apart from writing poetry, Martí i Pol also translated over 20 books, mainly from French. Among the authors he translated are Saint-Exupéry, Simone de Beauvoir, Apollinaire, Flaubert, Barthes, Lévi-Strauss and Zola.

== Politics ==
Martí i Pol was an active member of the PSUC (Unified Socialist Party of Catalonia) under the last years of the Franco dictatorship. He joined in 1968 and left in 1982, following a comment by Santiago Carrillo, long-time leader of the Spanish Communist Party, that the PSUC was "too Catalan and little Spanish".
