= José Ángel Saiz Meneses =

20th and 21st-century Roman Catholic Archbishop

His Grace, The Most Reverend, Monsignor. José Ángel Saiz Meneses
- Metropolitan Archbishop of Seville
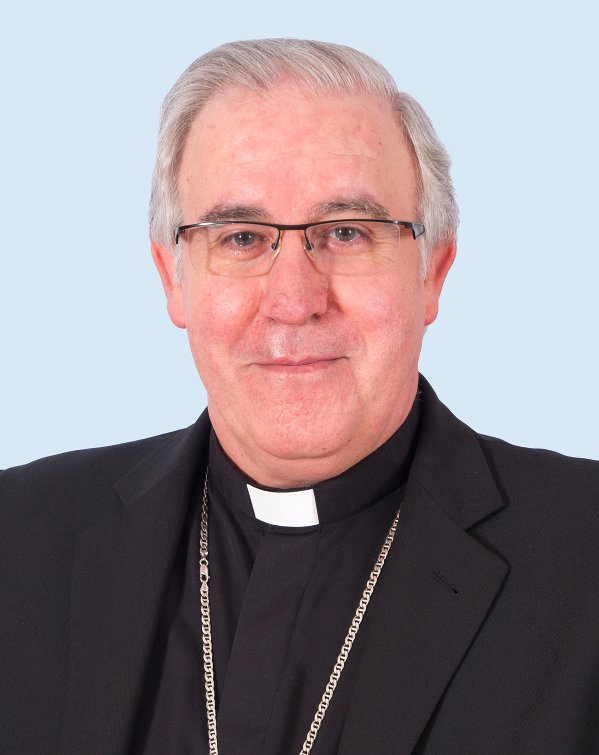
- Church: Roman Catholic Church
- Archdiocese: Seville
- Province: Seville

Personal details
- Born: José Ángel Saiz Meneses; 2 August 1956 (age 69) Sisante, Spain
- Denomination: Roman Catholic
- Residence: Seville, Spain
- Occupation: Archbishop, Clergyman

José Ángel Saiz Meneses (born 2 August 1956) is a Spanish prelate of the Catholic Church who has served as the metropolitan archbishop of Seville since 2021. He has been a bishop since 2001, serving as an auxiliary in Barcelona from 2001 to 2004 and as bishop of Terrassa from 2004 to 2021.

== Biography ==
José Ángel Saiz Meneses was born on 2 August 1956 in Sisante in the province of Cuenca, Spain. He moved with his family to Barcelona at an early age and began his ecclesiastical studies at the minor seminary of Barcelona and completed them in the seminary of Toledo. On 15 July 1984 he was ordained a priest of the diocese of Toledo by Cardinal Marcelo González Martín. He returned to Barcelona in 1989 for family reasons and was incardinated there in 1994. He obtained a licentiate in theology from the Faculty of Theology of Catalonia.

His assignments included: parish vicar and pastor in the archdiocese of Toledo (1984-1989). In the archdiocese of Barcelona he was parish vicar (1989-1992); rector of the parish of Mare de Déu del Roser in Cerdanyola del Vallès (1992); member of the council of the diocesan delegation of university pastoral care and of the university assistance and training service, as well as in charge of university pastoral care at the Bellaterra campus of the Autonomous University of Barcelona (1992); Assessor of the "Cursillos de Cristiandad" Movement (1994-1996) and, finally, Secretary General and Chancellor of the Curia of Barcelona (2000).

On 30 October 2001, Pope John Paul II named him an auxiliary bishop of Barcelona. He received his episcopal consecration on 15 December from Cardinal Ricard Maria Carles. Within the Spanish Episcopal Conference (SEC) he was a member of the commission on teaching and catechesis.

His coat of arms

On 15 June 2004 he was named the first bishop of the newly created Diocese of Terrassa. (Note: He was also briefly the apostolic administrator of the Archdiocese of Barcelona and the newly created diocese of Sant Feliu de Llobregat.) He was installed there on 25 July. Within the SEC he was a member of the Commission for the apostolate of the laity from 2002 to 2017); a member of the commission for teaching and catechesis from 2002 to 2005; a member of the commission for consecrated life from 2005 to 2008; president of the commission for seminaries and universities from 2008 to 2014; and a member of the commission for pastoral care from 2017 to 2020. From March 2020 he became a member of the executive committee and of the standing commission.

On 17 April 2021, Pope Francis appointed him metropolitan archbishop of Seville. He was installed there on 12 June. On 30 April 2022, he was made a member of the Congregation for the Causes of Saints.

== Notes ==
Catholic Church titles
New title	Bishop of Terrassa; 2004–2021	Succeeded by Salvador Cristau Coll
Preceded by Juan Asenjo Pelegrina	Archbishop of Seville; 2021–present	Incumbent
