= Jordi Ballart =

Spanish politician

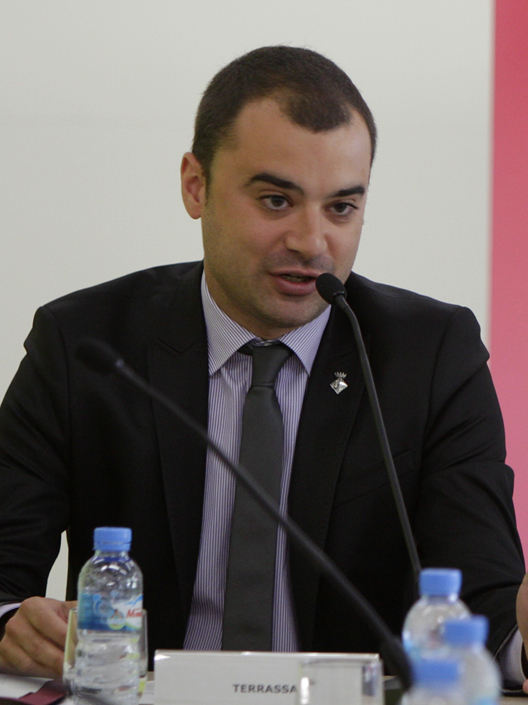

Jordi Ballart i Pastor (born 8 February 1980) is a Spanish politician who has been a city councillor (2005–2017; 2019–) and the mayor (2012–2017; 2019–) of Terrassa in Catalonia.

He resigned from office and from membership of the Socialists' Party of Catalonia (PSC) in 2017 due to disagreements with their stance on the 2017 Catalan independence referendum. He founded his own party Tot per Terrassa (TxT) in 2018 and returned to the mayoralty in 2019, ending 40 years of PSC control in the city.

== Career ==
Ballart became secretary of Terrassa's PSC youth group in 1999, remaining in office for seven years. After graduating in Political Sciences and Administration from the Autonomous University of Barcelona, he was elected to the city hall in 2005. In 2012, as Pere Navarro moved up to being the party's regional leader, Ballart became secretary of Terrassa's PSC; already the mayor's deputy in charge of Urban Planning, he became the PSC's spokesman in the city hall in the same year.

After Navarro's resignation, Ballart was invested as mayor on 10 December 2012, Terrassa's third since the Spanish transition to democracy. He told La Vanguardia that he would rather have been directly elected than indirectly by city councillors, but that is the constitutional law. After the 2015 elections, his party won a plurality with nine seats, though Xavier Mantilla of Terrassa en Comú was the most voted for mayoral candidate; the abstention of the mayoral vote by the four city councillors from Convergence and Union meant that no candidate had a majority and the mayoralty went to Ballart as leader of the largest party.

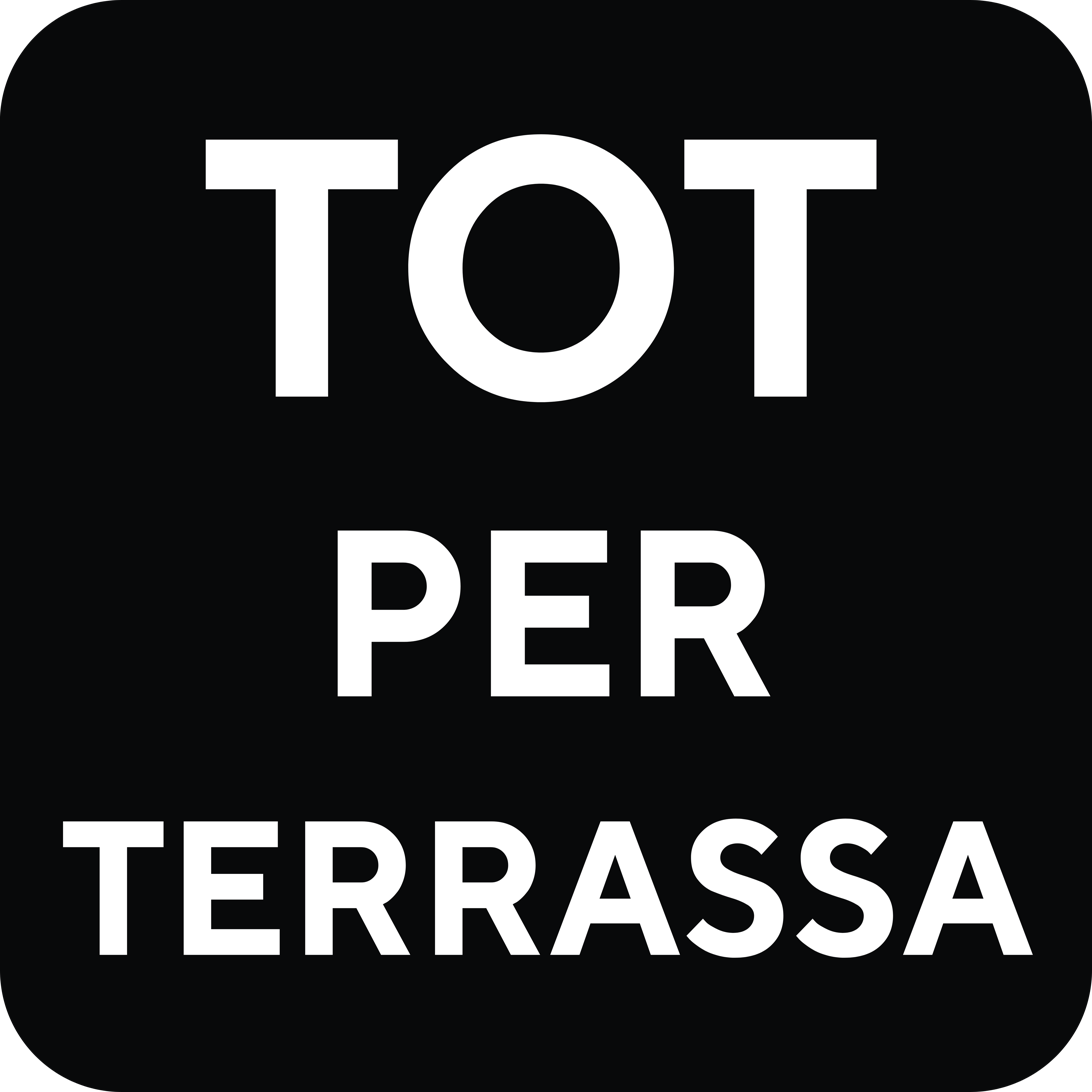
Logo of Tot per Terrassa

In early November 2017, Ballart resigned as mayor and councillor, and left the PSC. He accused the party and its national affiliate the Spanish Socialist Workers' Party (PSOE) of moving to the right and endorsing the People's Party (PP) national government's jailing of the leaders of the 2017 Catalan independence referendum. In June 2018, he set up a new party called Tot per Terrassa (TxT) to contest the 2019 elections. He was the surprise winner of those elections, taking ten seats and ending the 40-year reign of the PSC in the city.

In the 2023 Spanish local elections, Ballart's party remained the largest in the city hall. Vox entered the council, and Ballart publicly said that party should be banned.

== Personal life ==
Ballart is openly gay. He and his partner adopted three children, with the adoption being made official on 14 June 2019, the day before he was sworn in as mayor. Their adopted children are siblings with special needs. The eldest was diagnosed with leukaemia in August 2021.

Ballart has been targeted for abuse and harassment based on his sexual orientation.
