= Pere Navarro =

Spanish politician

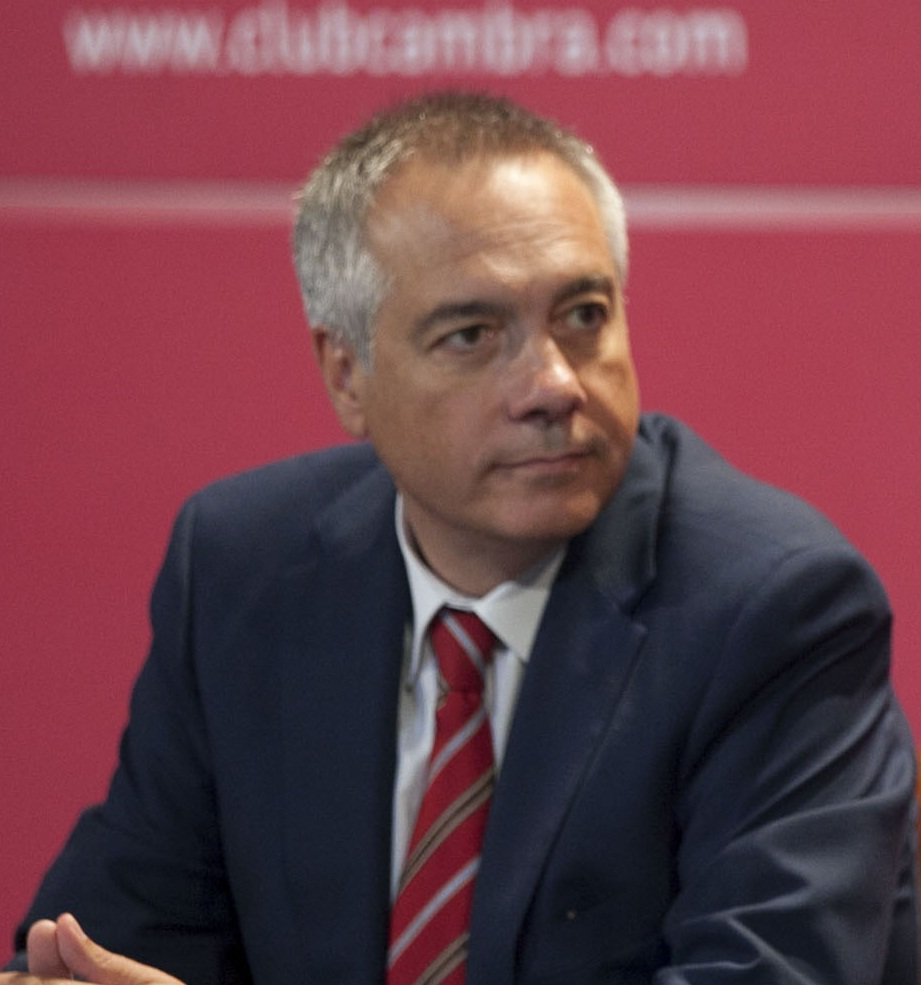

First Secretary of the Socialists' Party of Catalonia
- In office 17 December 2011 – 13 July 2014
- Preceded by: José Montilla
- Succeeded by: Miquel Iceta

Mayor of Terrassa
- In office 14 April 2002 – 30 November 2012
- Preceded by: Manuel Royes
- Succeeded by: Jordi Ballart

Personal details
- Born: Pere Navarro i Morera; 23 December 1959 (age 66) Terrassa, Barcelona, Spain
- Party: Socialists' Party of Catalonia

Pere Navarro i Morera (born 23 December 1959) is a Spanish politician and member of the Socialists' Party of Catalonia, formerly First Secretary of the PSC between 2011 and 2014.

== Biography ==
He has a degree in Biology from the Autonomous University of Barcelona (UAB) and is married with two daughters. He began his membership of the PSC-Congrés in 1977. He was one of the founders of the Socialist Youth of Catalonia in Terrassa and in 1982 he was on the PSC's list for the general elections. In 1983, he was responsible for the PSC's campaign in the municipal elections in Terrassa.

In 1987, he was elected a councillor in the Terrassa town council, becoming assistant to the town planning department. Four years later he was appointed president of District 5. In 1994, he was elected first secretary of the PSC in Terrassa and the following year he was appointed councillor for Citizen Participation and Youth. Later, in 1998, he was appointed to another council, that of Culture. In 1999, he was appointed fourth deputy mayor, a post he held simultaneously with the councils of Culture and Solidarity and International Cooperation, and continued with these responsibilities until 2002, when he replaced the then mayor, Manuel Royes.

In the 2003 municipal elections, he was head of the PSC list in Terrassa and won 13 of the 27 councillors on the council. He was invested as mayor thanks to a pact with ICV-EUiA and ERC, a result that he repeated in 2007. In the 2011 municipal elections, although he lost two councillors, he re-validated the mayor's office after a pact with ICV-EUiA.

In 2011, following his party's results in the general elections, he ran as a candidate to lead the PSC.3 On 17 December 2011, at the 12th party congress, he was elected first secretary of the PSC with 73.06% of the votes.

On September 30, 2012, he was elected as candidate to the Generalitat of Catalonia by the Socialist Party of Catalonia in the elections to the Parliament of Catalonia. In these elections he obtained 14.6% of the votes and 20 seats, being the second force in terms of votes but the third in terms of number of seats, these being the worst results in the history of the PSC in an autonomous election. On 30 November 2012, he resigned as mayor of Tarrasa to focus on his work within the PSC from the Parliament of Catalonia.

In July 2018, he was elected as the new special delegate of the State to the Barcelona Free Zone Consortium (CZFB) by the government of Pedro Sánchez and is appointed president of the Executive Committee.

== Debacle in the 2014 European elections and Pere Navarro's resignation as PSC Secretary General ==
After his party's electoral debacle in the 2014 European Parliament Elections and the criticism of the Catalanist sector of the PSC for his management of the general secretariat led him to present the resignation as the party's general secretary, holding this position for the shortest period of time in the history of his party. After his resignation, he was appointed first secretary of the Parliament of Catalonia.
