= Cristina Lacasa =

Spanish poet and short story writer

Cristina Lacasa (1929–2011) was a Spanish poet and short story writer. She was considered an important figure among contemporary Spanish poets.

== Biography and writing ==
Lacasa was born in Terrassa in 1929. She was a writer of testimonial poetry. She was not associated with any contemporary group of writers, but still established herself as a significant poetic figure in Spain during her lifetime. Her works were lyrical, calling for peace whilst decrying the injustice and sadness of human life. Poemas de la muerta y de la via (1966, Poems of Death and of Life), for example, is a meditation upon the themes of love, life and death. Some of her poetry has an autobiographical tone, such as La voz oculta (1953, The Occult Voice) and Con el sudor alzado (1964, With Sweat Raised) which emphasises her life's dreams and failures.

Lacasa was awarded the Ciudad de Barcelona prize for Castilian Poetry in 1964 for her collection Poemas de la muerte y de la vida. She also wrote two short story collections: Jinetes sin caballo (1979, Riders without a Horse) and Los caballos sin bridas (1981, Horses without Reins).

== Works ==
=== Poetry ===
- La voz oculta (1953, The Hidden Voice)
- Los brazos en estala (1958, Trailing Arms)
- Un resplandor que no perdonó la noche (1961, Splendor Unforgiven by the Night)
- Con el sudor alzado (1964, With Raised Sweat)
- Poemas de la muerte y de la vida (1966, Poems of Death and Life)
- Encender los olivos como lámparas (1969, Light the Olive Trees Like Lamps)
- Ha llegado la hora (1971, The Time Has Come)
- Opalos del instante (1982, Opals of the Moment)
- En un plural designio (1983, In a Plural Design)
- Ramas de la esperanza (1984, Branches of Hope)

=== Short stories ===
- Jinetes sin caballo (1979, Riders Without Horses)
- Los caballos sin bridas (1981, Horses Without Reins)
