= Diocese of Terrassa =

Roman Catholic diocese in Spain

Coordinates: 41°33′40″N 2°0′29″E

Diocese of Terrassa Dioecesis Terrassensis Diócesis de Tarrassa (es) Diòcesi de Terrassa (ca)

Catholic
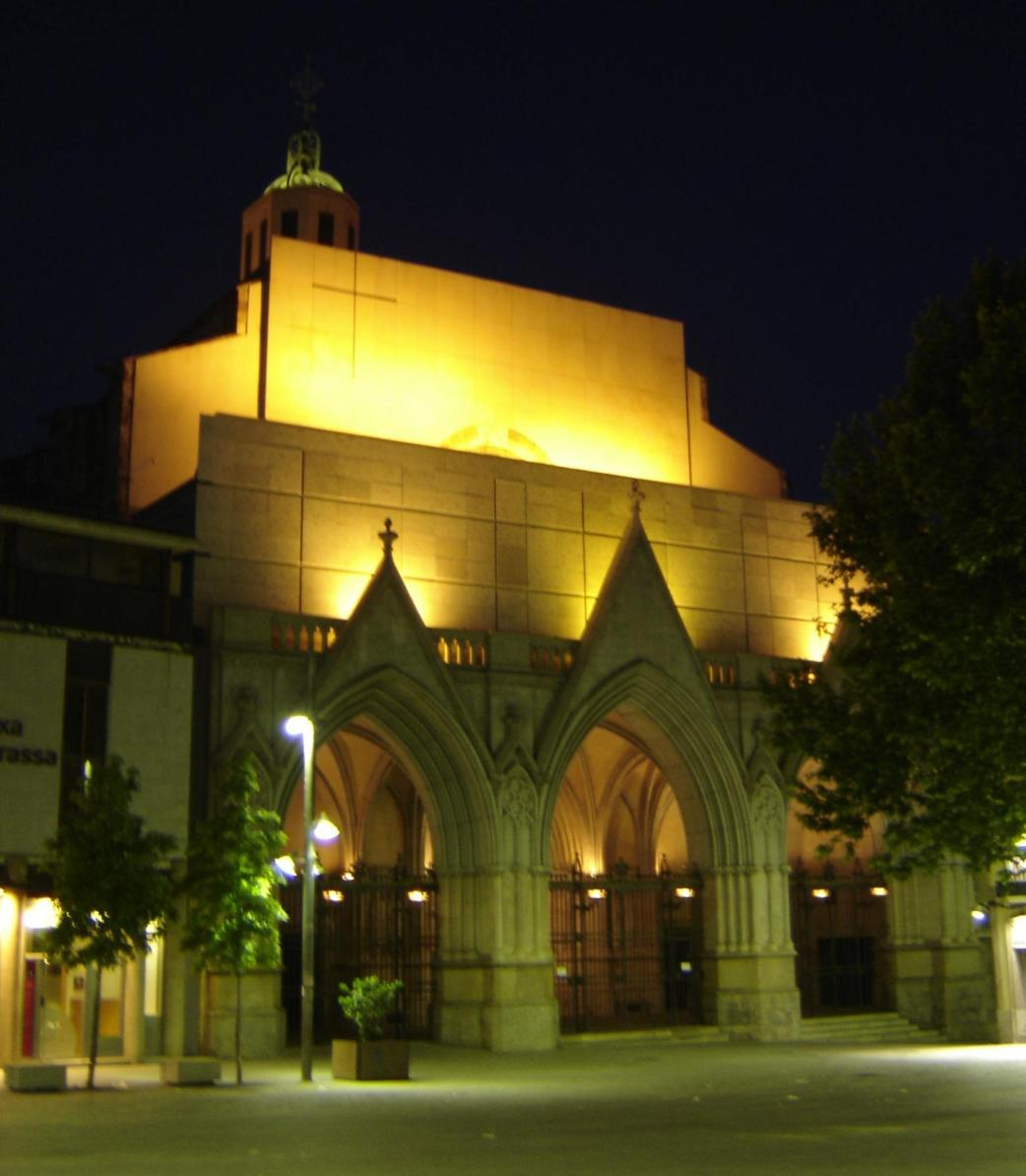
- Terrassa Cathedral

Location
- Country: Spain
- Ecclesiastical province: Barcelona
- Metropolitan: Barcelona

Statistics
- Area: 1,200 km^{2} (460 sq mi)
- Population: Total; Catholics: (as of 2010); 1,238,655; 1,222,420 (98.7%)

Information
- Rite: Latin Rite
- Cathedral: Cathedral Basilica of the Holy Spirit in Terrassa

Current leadership
- Pope: Leo XIV
- Bishop: Salvador Cristau Coll
- Metropolitan Archbishop: Joan Josep Omella i Omella

Website
- Website of the Diocese

The Diocese of Terrassa (Latin: Dioecesis Terrassensis) is a Latin diocese of the Catholic Church located in the city of Terrassa in the ecclesiastical province of Barcelona in Catalonia, Spain.

== History ==
- 450 - The Diocese of Egara (an ancient city in the current territory of Terrassa), suppressed by the Arab invasion of Spain (720 c.)
- June 15, 2004 - Established as Diocese of Terrassa from the Metropolitan Archdiocese of Barcelona.

== Leadership ==
Bishops

- José Ángel Saiz Meneses (2004.06.15 – 2021.04.17)
- Salvador Cristau Coll (3 December 2021 – present)

Auxiliary bishops

- Salvador Cristau Coll

== See also ==
- Roman Catholicism in Spain

== Sources ==
- GCatholic.org
- Catholic Hierarchy
- Diocese website (in Catalan)
