= Terrassa =

Terrassa Tarrasa (Spanish)
- Municipality
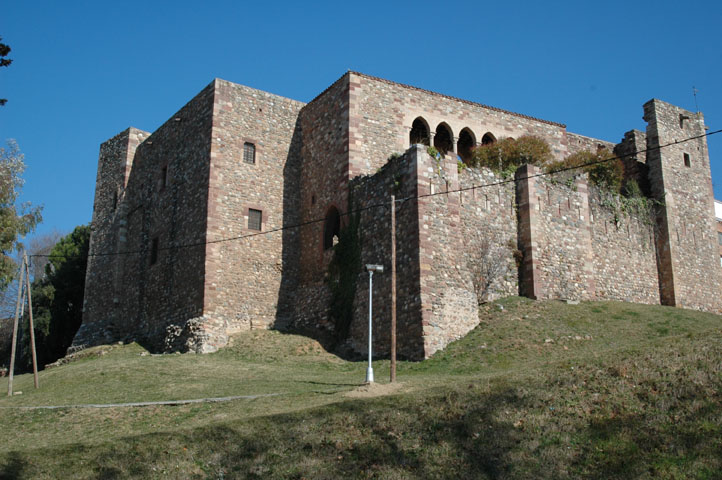
- Castle of Vallparadís

- Flag Coat of arms
- Location of Terrassa
- Location in Vallès Occidental county

- Location within Catalonia Location within Spain
- Coordinates: 41.570°N 2.013°E
- Country: Spain
- Community: Catalonia
- Province: Barcelona
- Region: Barcelona
- County: Vallès Occidental

Government
  - Mayor: Jordi Ballart (TxT)

Area
  - Total: 70.13 km^{2} (27.08 sq mi)
- Elevation: 286 m (938 ft)

Population (2025)
  - Total: 232,676
  - Rank: 21st in Spain
  - Density: 3,318/km^{2} (8,593/sq mi)
- Demonym(s): terrassenc, -ca egarenc, -ca (Catalan)
- Time zone: UTC+1 (CET)
  - Summer (DST): UTC+2 (CEST)
- Postcode: 08221 to 08229
- Official language(s): Catalan; Spanish
- Climate: Cfa
- Website: www.terrassa.cat

Terrassa (Catalan pronunciation: [təˈrasə], Spanish: Tarrasa) is a city in the autonomous community of Catalonia in Spain, in the province of Barcelona. It is one of the two capitals of Vallès Occidental county, being the larger in both area and population, 70.12 km^{2} (27.07 sq mi) and 232,676 respectively.

Terrassa is known for its industrial past and present, its lively cultural scene, its industrial modernist architecture, its status as a "City of Film" and as the seat of several universities such as UPC, ESCAC, Institut del Teatre and EUIT. It was also awarded in 2024 the Council of Europe's "The Europe Prize" for cities with an outstanding commitment to European values.

It is the site of Roman Egara, a former Visigothic bishopric, which became a Latin Catholic titular see. Since 2004, it has been the see of a bishopric.

The city is located in the Catalan Prelitoral depression (Depressió Prelitoral), at the feet of the Prelitoral mountain range (natural reserve of Sant Llorenç del Munt) and the average altitude of the city is 277 meters above sea level. It is 20 and 18 kilometres from Barcelona and Montserrat respectively. Terrassa's location as the most-inland city in the Barcelona Metropolitan Region means it is sometimes referred to as the "entrance to Central Catalonia".

As of 2025, Terrassa is the third largest city in Catalonia, after Barcelona and l'Hospitalet de Llobregat. Terrassa is also the largest municipality in what is considered the second most important urban, economic and cultural center of Catalonia, the Vallès region.

== Name ==
The name Terrassa derives from Latin Terracia, either from earlier Terracium castellum (“earthen castle”), or meaning "terrace", "area of flat land". Historically, the name of the city has been spelled Terraça, Terraza, Terraca and Tarrassa in the native Catalan language whilst it was traditionally spelled Tarrasa in Spanish. The Spanish spelling is now largely out of use given its ties with the Francoist Regime and the sole official spelling has been the Catalan Terrassa since 1978.

== History ==
=== Prehistory ===
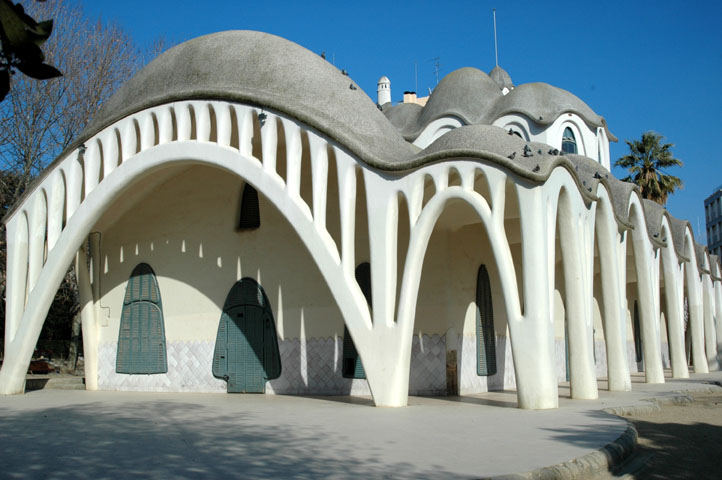
The Masia Freixa of Terrassa, sea of parabolic arches

The remains that have been found indicate that the area where Terrassa stands has been inhabited since prehistory. In 2005, during the construction of a tunnel for one of the city's railway lines, a prehistoric site was found in Vallparadís Park, with stone tools and fossils of hunted animals dating back 800,000 to 1,000,000 years, making this one of the oldest prehistoric sites in Europe.

=== Ancient Egara ===
Terrassa originated as the Roman town of Egara (Municipium Flavium Egara), which was founded during the time of the emperor Vespasian (69–79 CE), alongside the torrent of Vallparadís (nowadays an urban park) close to the Iberian town of Egosa, on the site of which some ceramics and coins have been found.

=== Modern Terrasa ===
In the 17th century it was the site of the Terrassa witch trials, where 6 women were arrested, tortured and convicted of witchcraft. Five of them were hanged on 27 October 1619 near a present-day railway bridge.

Other important remains from the Middle Ages are the former cathedral, the castle of Vallparadís (from 1344 to 1413 a Carthusian monastery and today a municipal museum) and the tower of the castle-palace of the count-king.

In the 19th century the city played an important role in the industrial revolution, specializing in woollen fabrics, and today there is a major Modernista legacy as a result of the city's importance at that time. Particularly notable Modernista buildings include the Masia Freixa (1907), the Vapor Aymerich, Amat i Jover textile mill (1907) (now the Museum of Science and Industry of Catalonia), the Principal theater (1920), the city hall (1902), the Alegre de Sagrera house/museum (1911), the Industrial School (1904), the Gran Casino (1920), the Parc de Desinfecció (1920), and the Independència market (1908).

Terrassa is a partner city of the Art nouveau network, a European network of co-operation created in 1999 for the study, preservation and development of Art Nouveau.

Terrassa is a famous movie production center in Europe and was named a City of Film by UNESCO. The city is home to the largest film studios in Catalonia and the Iberian Peninsula, the Parc Audiovisual de Catalunya, where numerous movies and TV Shows such as REC, A Monster Calls and Operación Triunfo have been filmed.

=== Catastrophes ===
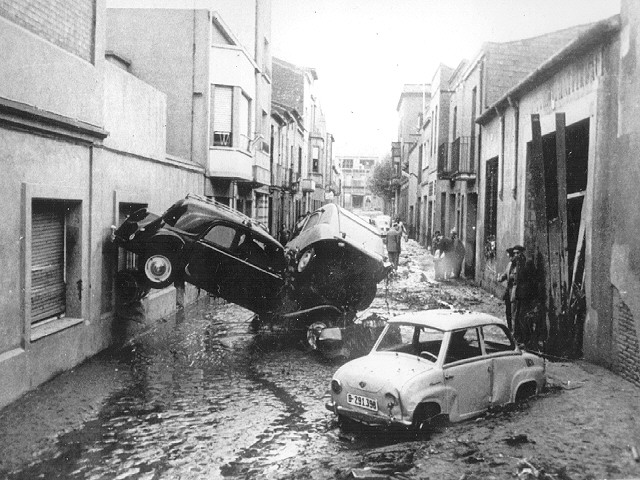
Results of the 1962 flood in Terrassa the day after. Picture obtained in the Tobella's archive.

On 25 September 1962, after a long dry summer, between 212 and 252 litres of rain per square metre fell in three hours. It caused the rivers Llobregat and Besòs and their tributaries to overflow, creating a water avenue that caused 700 victims and heavy material losses.

The Vallès Occidental comarca was the most damaged. In particularly Terrassa, with 327 victims. The reason of these numbers was that building was permitted around two dry streams used to bring rain water to the Llobregat river. They met in a wedge shape and were not properly channelized. When the streams overflowed it created what was called "the dead triangle", with more than a hundred victims in the Ègara neighbourhood alone.

=== Ecclesiastical history ===
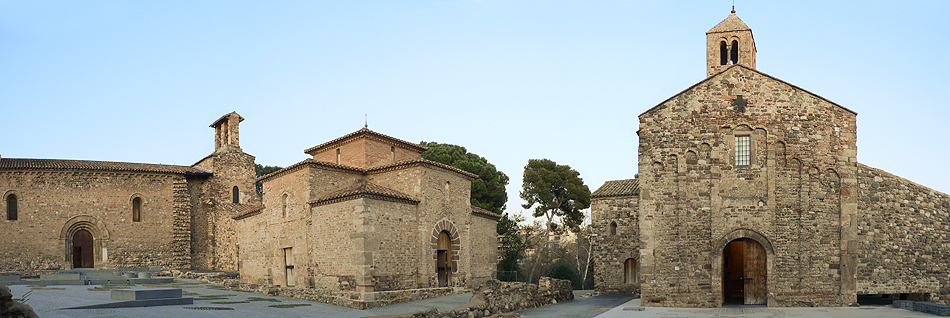
Ancient churches of Ègara.

The episcopal see of Ègara already existed by about 450 CE, when it was established on territory split off from the Roman Catholic Diocese of Barcelona, under the Metropolitan Archdiocese of Tarragona. Pope Hilarius confirmed its autonomy by denying a request around 469 to unite it with the Barcelona under its own first bishop, Ireneus.

It comprised parts of these Comarques of Catalonia (Catalan districts) : Alt Penedès, Anoia, Baix Llobregat, Vallès Occidental and Vallès Oriental. A Provincial Council of Tarragona was held there in 615.

It effectively succumbed to the Arab (Muslim) conquest in the 8th century and was probably suppressed, its territory being (rather nominally) returned to the Diocese of Barcelona. The Marian cathedral continued to exist until 718, when it was taken over during the Umayyad conquest of Hispania, but was rebuilt in the 12th century, and remains part of a monumental complex of ancient Visigothic-Romanesque churches of Sant Pere de Terrassa and Sant Miquel on the site.

After the Catholic Reconquista of the region in the tenth century, the see was not restored, its territory being incorporated in the (mother) diocese of Barcelona. Why a request to restore the bishopric by its Metropolitan of Tarragona, Cesareo, wasn't honored by Pope John XII (955–964) is unclear.

In 2004, Pope John Paul II created the new Diocese of Terrassa on territory taken from the Archdiocese of Barcelona. Its seat is the Cathedral of Holy Spirit.

=== Diocese of Egara ===
Suffragan Bishops of Egara

- Ireneo (450? – death 465)
- Saint Nebridio (516? – 527?), who was possibly transferred to Barcelona, which had a homonym incumbent in 540.
- Tauro (546? – ?)
- Sofronio (589? – 592?)
- Ilergio (594? – 610?)
- Eugenio (633? – ?)
- Vincenzo (653? – ?)
- Giovanni (683? – 693?)

Titular see of Egara

In 1969 Pope Paul VI created the titular see of Egara.

The title has been held by:

- Justo Goizueta Gridilla, O.A.R. (14 January 1970 – retired 15 February 1978), as Bishop-Prelate of Territorial Prelature of Madera (Mexico) (1970.01.14 – 1988.02.02), previously Apostolic Administrator of same Madera (1967 – 14 January 1970); died 1991
- Juan Francisco Sarasti Jaramillo, C.I.M. (8 March 1978 – 23 December 1983) as Auxiliary Bishop of Roman Catholic Archdiocese of Cali (Colombia) (8 March 1978 – 23 December 1983); later Bishop of Barrancabermeja (Colombia) (23 December 1983 – 25 March 1993), Metropolitan Archbishop of Ibagué (Colombia) (25 March 1993 – 17 August 2002), Metropolitan Archbishop of above Cali (17 August 2002 – retired 18 May 2011) and Apostolic Administrator of Buenaventura (Colombia) (21 February 2004 – 29 April 2004)
- Paulius Antanas Baltakis, O.F.M. (1 June 1984 – 17 May 2019)
- Luis Miguel Romero Fernández, M. Id. (20 March 2020 – present), Auxiliary Bishop of Rockville Centre, New York City

== Government ==
The Municipal Council has 27 seats and the local elections of May 2023 resulted in:

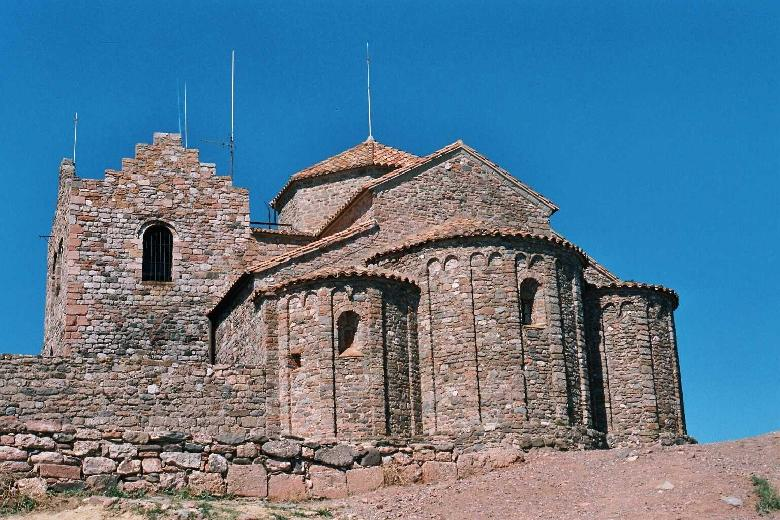
Romanesque monastery at the top of la Mola (1107 m), the highest point of the natural reserve of Sant Llorenç del Munt i Serra de l'Obac

- All for Terrassa (Tot per Terrassa, TxT) – 11 seats (33.46%)
- Socialists' Party of Catalonia (Partit dels Socialistes de Catalunya, PSC) – 7 seats (20.91%)
- Vox (Vox) - 3 seats (10.49%)
- Republican Left of Catalonia (Esquerra Republicana de Catalunya, ERC) – 2 seats (7.56%)
- Together for Catalonia (Junts per Catalunya, JUNTS) – 2 seats (7.56%)
- People's Party (Partit Popular, PP) - 2 seats (6.56%)

The municipal government is formed by a coalition of the left of center municipalist Tot per Terrassa and the center-right pro-independence JUNTS. The Mayor is Jordi Ballart (TxT).

== Demographics ==
Historical population (current boundaries)
Year	Pop.	±%
1842	7,858	—
1857	10,915	+38.9%
1877	14,041	+28.6%
1887	15,921	+13.4%
1900	20,195	+26.8%
1910	21,986	+8.9%
1920	29,188	+32.8%
1930	37,470	+28.4%
1940	45,682	+21.9%
1950	56,828	+24.4%
1960	91,597	+61.2%
1970	136,952	+49.5%
1981	155,614	+13.6%
1991	158,063	+1.6%
2001	173,775	+9.9%
2011	214,406	+23.4%
2021	222,576	+3.8%
Source: INE

As of 2025, the population is 232,676, of which 49.1% are males, and 50.9% are females. Minors make up 18.1% of the population, and seniors also make up 18.1%.

=== Immigration ===
As of 2025, immigrants make up 21.3% of the population. The 5 largest foreign countries of birth are Morocco, Colombia, Venezuela, Ecuador, and Argentina.

Foreign-born population (2025)
Country of birth	Population
Morocco	14,770
Colombia	4,083
Venezuela	3,519
Ecuador	3,476
Argentina	2,189
Peru	1,908
Dominican Republic	1,893
Paraguay	1,704
Honduras	1,626
Senegal	1,359
China	1,119
Romania	921
Cuba	819
Bolivia	818
Pakistan	770

== Sights ==
=== The churches of Sant Pere (Saint Peter) ===
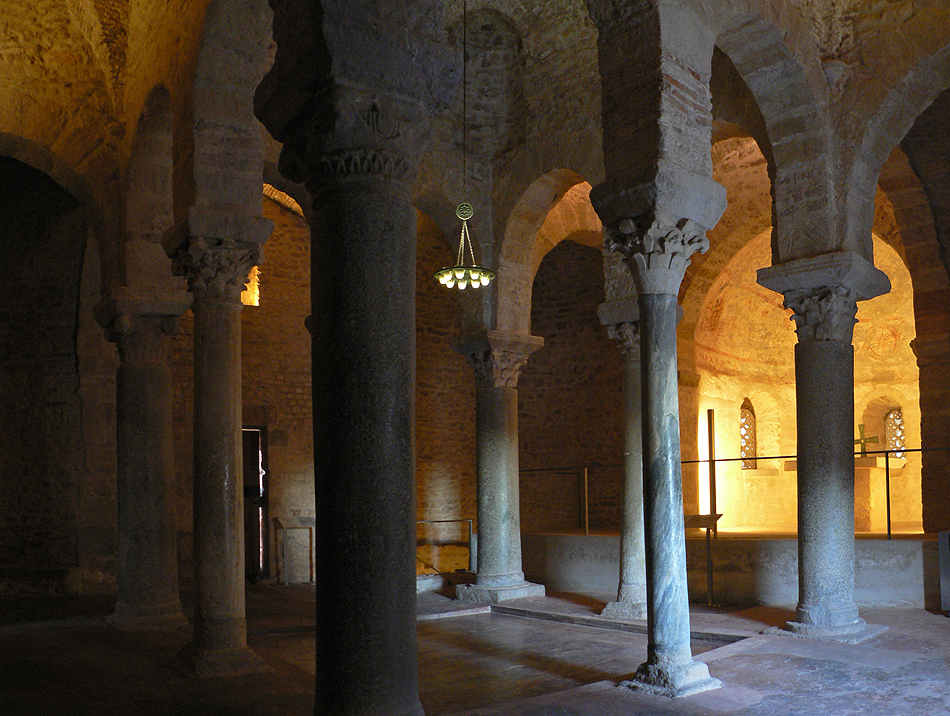
Sant Miquel.

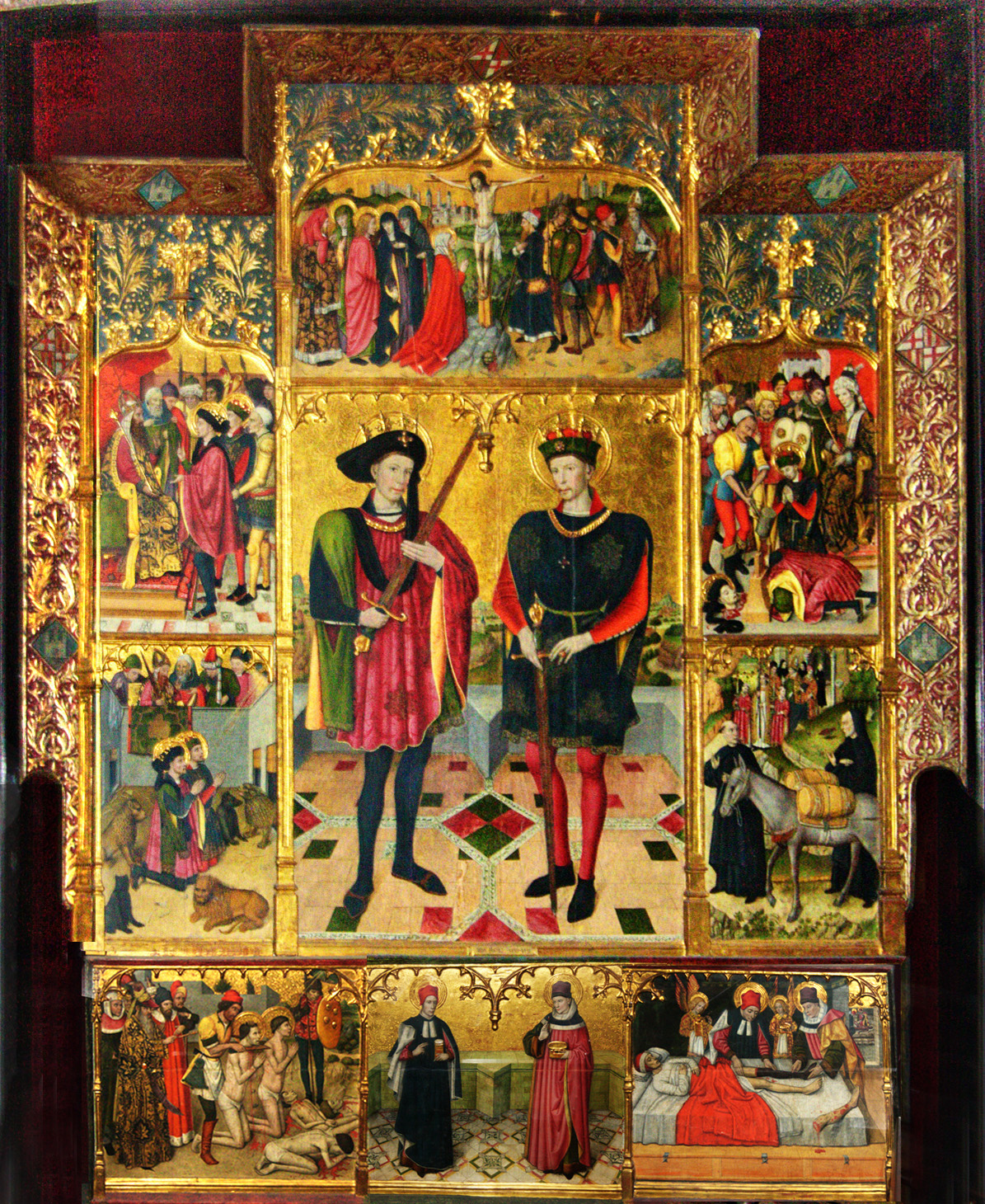
Altarpiece of Sant Abdó i Sant Senén.

These three churches were built close to the site of old Ègara to be the seat of the Ègara Diocese, which was founded around 450 CE and remained in existence until the 8th century. This episcopal complex follows the Byzantine model of antiquity, with two churches (Sant Pere and Santa Maria) and a mausoleum (Sant Miquel). After a long period of construction, the churches were finished in the then-current manner about the 11th and 12th centuries and in Romanesque style, on the site of the pre-Romanesque buildings of the Visigothic period. The church of Santa Maria contains outstanding works of art, and there are murals dating from the Romanesque period to the Gothic. There is also an altar stone dating from the 10th century and medieval and Romanesque tombstones (one of which documents the name of the Roman town of Egara). In the transept there are three Gothic altarpieces.

- Santa Maria (Saint Mary) the old Cathedral
  - Apse from the 6th century
  - Nave from the 11th century with exterior Lombardy-style decorations
  - Romanesque frescoes of Saint Thomas Becket from the 12th century
  - Frescoes from the 13th century
- Sant Pere (Saint Peter)
  - Transept and apse from 9th to 10th centuries
  - Nave from the 12th century
  - Mosaic from the 10th century (geometric designs)
  - Stone altarpiece of Sant Pere from the 10th century
  - Gothic frescoes from the 13th century
- Sant Miquel (Saint Michael)
  - The Greek cross plan and the walls are the originals from the 6th century
  - Frescoes from the 7th and 8th centuries in the apse
- Other items
  - Altarpiece of Sant Pere (1411) by Lluís Borrassà
  - Altarpiece of Roser (1587)
  - Altarpiece of Sant Ruf (17th century)
  - Altarpiece of Sant Miquel (1450–51) by Jaume Cirera and Guillem Talarn
  - Gothic altarpiece of Sant Abdó i Sant Senén (1460) by Jaume Huguet
  - Polychrome sculpture of Saint Mary from the 14th century

=== Other ===
The city is heir to a rich medieval, Modernista and industrial legacy, and possesses an extensive network of libraries, historical archives and museums.

- The museum of Terrassa, municipally owned, has various sections:
  - Castle/Charterhouse of Vallparadís, in the Park of Vallparadís
  - Visigothic-Romanesque churches of Sant Pere (Saint Peter)
  - Casa Alegre de Sagrera, Modernista house in Carrer Font Vella
  - Tower of the Palau, the only vestige of the castle-palace of the count-kings of Catalonia in Terrassa
  - Center of medieval interpretation of the city of Terrassa
  - Convent of Sant Francesc, cloister decorated with polychromed ceramics (1671–1673)
- Museum of Science and Industry of Catalonia, in the former Aymerich Amat i Jover mill, managed by the Generalitat de Catalunya

== Culture ==
=== Traditional Catalan culture ===
The city is home to a lively Catalan cultural scene. Compared to other cities its size, like Sabadell or l'Hospitalet de Llobregat it houses a significant number of colles (groups) of different Catalan cultural traditions. Most notably the Minyons de Terrassa, one of the three colles castelleres (human tower groups) of the city, is considered among the best in the world and were the first to complete a 10-story human tower in 1998. Alongside the Minyons, the city also houses two other colles castelleres: the Castellers de Terrassa and the university's colla, the Bergants del Campus Terrassa.

The city is also home to a multitude of diables and bestiari de foc (fire-centric groups) such as the Diables de Terrassa, Pàjara de Terrassa, Drac de Terrassa, Drac Baluk Asharot i Diables de Ca n'Aurell, Bitxo del Torrent Mitger, among many others. The bestiari (traditional Catalan processional figures representing animals) extends also to non-fire figures such as the water-spewing Hipodragona, Cuca Japonesa or the Papallona de Sant Pere or the purely processional figures like the Àliga de Terrassa or the Mulassa de Terrassa.

In the realm of Gegants, the city has a very prominent colla which manages over 3 pairs of processional giants, as well as a colla gegantera (processional giant group) from the Les Fonts district and the Gegants Bojos de Terrassa group.

Several Sardana-dancing groups as well as Esbart dancers, two Bastoners groups, Ball de Gitanes dancers and Trabucaires also call the city home.

=== Music and theater ===
A lot of musicians and actors are based in Terrassa because of the large number of music schools, a long amateur theater tradition and the local seat of the Institut del Teatre. Since 1982, the Terrassa Jazz Festival has been especially outstanding, with guests like Stan Getz, Chet Baker, Dexter Gordon, Tete Montoliu, Dizzy Gillespie. Local bands and musicians such as Doctor Prats, Lildami or Miki Núñez have also developed a national and international following.

=== Mass media ===
Terrasa has a local newspaper, the Diari de Terrassa, that is published daily from Tuesday to Saturday, as well as several radio stations: Ràdio Terrassa/Cadena SER Vallès on 828 AM and 89.4 FM, with more than 75 years of history behind it, being one of the pioneering radio stations in Catalonia and Spain; the municipal radio (Noucincpuntdos, 95.2 FM); and Radio Star de Terrassa, the city's cultural station, on 100.5 FM, which was founded in 1984 and is one of the historic local radios of Catalonia.

Also, the city has several local channels – TV20 Locàlia Vallès and Canal Terrassa, with an audience of more than 50,000 viewers. In addition, there is the free newspaper Terrassa Societat, published monthly with a circulation of 50,000, and Terrassa Month, published of Monday through Friday and also covering local events. Since 2005 the municipal digital newspaper e-newsterrassa.com, in Catalan, has been on line (as for 2013, this digital newspaper has been taken down). The municipal Web site www.terrassa.cat receives no fewer than 150,000 monthly visitors.

== Transport ==
Terrassa is served by Josep Tarradellas Barcelona–El Prat Airport and is well connected with Barcelona's port by highway and railway. The C-58 and C-16 also link the city with (Manresa), (Girona, France), and (Tarragona).

The railway reached Terrassa in 1856, and nowadays two lines serve the city. The first, operated by Renfe, connects with Barcelona and Lleida, and the second, operated by FGC, with Barcelona. Recently FGC extended its line to the north of the city, building three new stations; one of them acts as a rail hub with the Renfe line. This extension is known as the Terrassa Metro.

Several interurban bus lines connect Terrassa with the closest cities and towns such as Sabadell, Castellar del Vallès, Martorell, Rubí, Sant Cugat del Vallès and Vacarisses.

Transport inside the city is provided by 14 bus lines operated by a municipal company (Transports Municipals d'Ègara). In the future, when the three new FGC stations and the two planned for the Renfe line are in use, the railway will also serve as urban transport.

== Sport ==
Terrassa was a pioneer in the introduction of field hockey and korfball in Catalonia and played an important role in the introduction of basketball. The most important sport in the city is field hockey. During the Barcelona Olympic Games in 1992, Terrassa was the city where the field hockey competition was played. The great number of hockey players from Terrassa who have participated in the Olympic Games over the years has led to Terrassa's being referred to as the "most Olympic city in the world". Between 1928 and 2004, Terrassa sent 124 athletes to the Olympic Games, the majority of whom were hockey players. Three local field hockey clubs, Atlètic Terrassa, Club Egara and Club Deportiu Terrassa have all won the División de Honor de Hockey Hierba and the Copa del Rey de Hockey Hierba. Atlètic Terrassa and Club Egara have also won the EuroHockey Club Champions Cup.

Other local sports teams include Club de Rugby Carboners de Terrassa, CN Terrassa (water polo), Terrassa FC (association football), CP San Cristóbal (association football) and Sferic Terrassa (basketball).

Terrassa is the home and birthplace of FC Barcelona and Spain national football team midfielders Xavi and Dani Olmo.

The city's castells teams are the Minyons de Terrassa and the Castellers de Terrassa. On 22 November 2015, Terrassa's Plaça Vella was the scene of the world's first successful 4 de 10 amb folre i manilles, completed by the Minyons.

== Notable people ==
- Joseph Oller (1835–1922), entrepreneur
- Domingo Cirici Ventalló (1878–1917), writer
- José María Cunill Postius (1896–1949), paramilitary leader
- Teresa Torrelles (1908–1991), anarcha-feminist activist
- Cristina Lacasa (1929–2011), writer
- Joana Biarnés (1935–2018), photographer
- Jaime Comas (1936–2021), screenwriter and producer
- Marta Pessarrodona (born 1941), writer
- Francesc Abad (born 1944), artist
- Eulàlia Grau (born 1946), artist
- Jordi Camí (born 1952), scholar in pharmacology
- Josep Roig Boada (born 1957), composer and producer
- Assumpta Escarp i Gibert (born 1957), politician
- Concha García Campoy (1958–2013), journalist
- Sergi Belbel (born 1963), playwright
- Josep Guijarro (born 1957), journalist and writer
- Pere Navarro (born 1959), politician
- Lluís Puig (born 1959), art director
- Enric Millo (born 1960), politician
- Josep Rull (born 1968), politician
- Joan Peñarroya (born 1969), basketball coach
- DJ Skudero (born 1976), mákina DJ and producer
- Aleix Villatoro i Oliver (born 1979), politician
- Xavi (born 1980), association football player and manager
- Jordi Ballart (born 1980), politician
- Cristian Canton Ferrer (born 1980), writer, musicologist and pianist
- Aleix Alcaraz (born 1990), racing driver
- Miki Núñez (born 1996), singer
- Dani Olmo (born 1998), footballer
- Vicky Losada (born 1991), footballer

== International relations ==
=== Twin towns – sister cities ===
Terrassa is twinned with five cities:

- Granada, Nicaragua
- Örebro, Sweden
- Pamiers, France
- Tecoluca, El Salvador
- Tétouan, Morocco

Terrassa also signed a protocol of special relations cooperation with:

- Otavalo, Ecuador

== See also ==
- School of Engineering of Terrassa
- List of Catholic dioceses in Spain, Andorra, Ceuta and Gibraltar

== Sources and external links ==
- Terrassa City Council
- Government data pages (in Catalan)
- The best things to do in Terrassa (in English)
- GCatholic; with Google satellite photo

Bibliography – ecclesiastical history

- D. Mansilla, lemma 'Egara' in Dictionnaire d'Histoire et de Géographie ecclésiastiques, vol. XIV, Paris 1960, coll. 1462–1466
