= Salvador Cristau Coll =

Spanish Catholic prelate (born 1950)

- Bishop of Terrassa
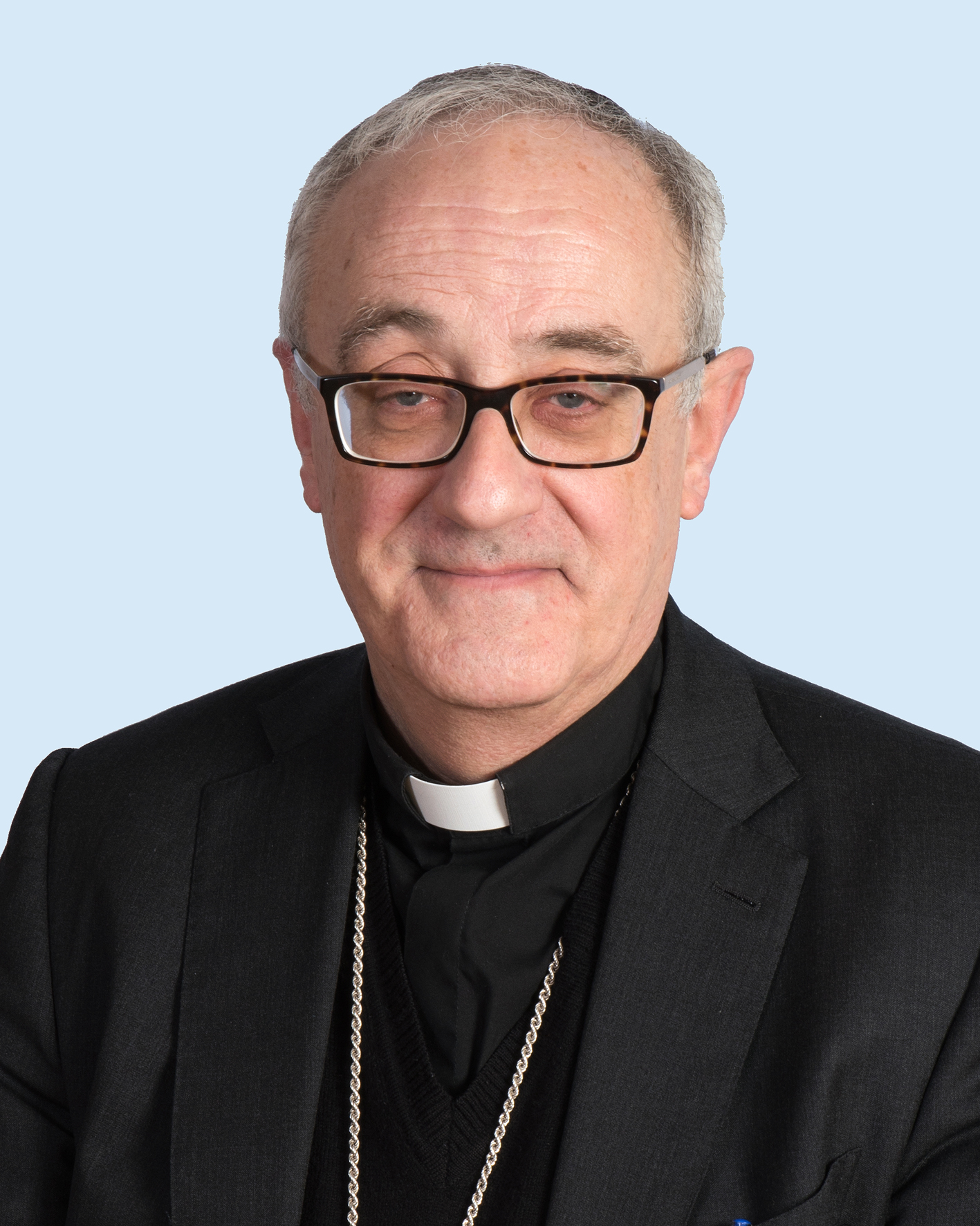
- Cristau Coll in 2017
- Native name: Salvador Cristau i Coll
- Church: Catholic Church
- Diocese: Diocese of Terrassa
- Appointed: 3 December 2021
- Predecessor: José Ángel Saiz Meneses
- Previous posts: Titular Bishop of Aliezira (2010-2021); Auxiliary Bishop of Terrassa (2010-2021)

Orders
- Ordination: 12 October 1980 by Marcelo González Martín
- Consecration: 26 June 2010 by José Ángel Saiz Meneses

Personal details
- Born: 15 April 1950 (age 76) Barcelona, Catalonia, Spanish State
- Coat of arms

Styles of Salvador Cristau Coll
- Reference style: The Most Reverend
- Spoken style: Your Excellency
- Religious style: Monsignor
- Posthumous style: Not applicable

Salvador Cristau Coll (born 15 April 1950) is a Spanish prelate of the Catholic Church who has been auxiliary bishop of the Diocese of Terrassa since 2010.

== Early life and education ==
Salvador Cristau Coll was born on 15 April 1950 in Barcelona, Spain. He studied at the Universidad Autónoma de Barcelona and received a Bachelor of Civil Law degree in 1972. Cristau entered the Upper Seminary of Toledo and graduated from the Theological Faculty of Northern Spain with a Bachelor of Theology degree.

=== Parish assignments ===
On October 12, 1980, Cristau was ordained a priest in the Catedral Primada Santa María de Toledo by Cardinal Marcelo González Martín for the Archdiocese of Toledo. From 1980 to 1981, he was the parochial vicar at the Good Shepherd Parish and from 1981 to 1984 at Saint Justus Parish. From 1984 to 1985 Cristau was the Parochial Administrator of the Saint Leocadia Parish.

On 14 January 1985, Cristau was incardinated as a priest of the Archdiocese of Barcelona and served as a parochial vicar to several churches.

=== Diocesan assignments ===
Between 1980 and 1985, Cristau served as the Judicial Vicar of the Toledo's diocesan Ecclesiastical Tribunal.

Within the Barcelona archdiocese, Cristau has held several positions to include the Diocesan Curia, Archpriest of the Cathedral and Secretary Chancellor of the Curia.

In 2004, after the erection of the Terrassa diocese, Cristau was incardinated there and was appointed as the diocesan vicar general.

== Episcopal career ==
On 18 May 2010, Pope Benedict appointed him titular bishop of Algeciras and auxiliary bishop of Terrassa. Cristau was ordained in Terrassa's cathedral on 26 June 2010 by Josep Àngel Saiz Meneses, Bishop of Terrassa. The co-consecrators were Archbishop Renzo Fratini, Apostolic Nuncio to Spain, and Lluís Martínez Sistach, Archbishop of Barcelona.
