= Terrassa Cathedral =

Roman Catholic cathedral in Terrassa, Spain

Coordinates: 41°33′44″N 2°0′42″E

Terrassa Cathedral Catedral-Basílica del Sant Esperit de Terrassa
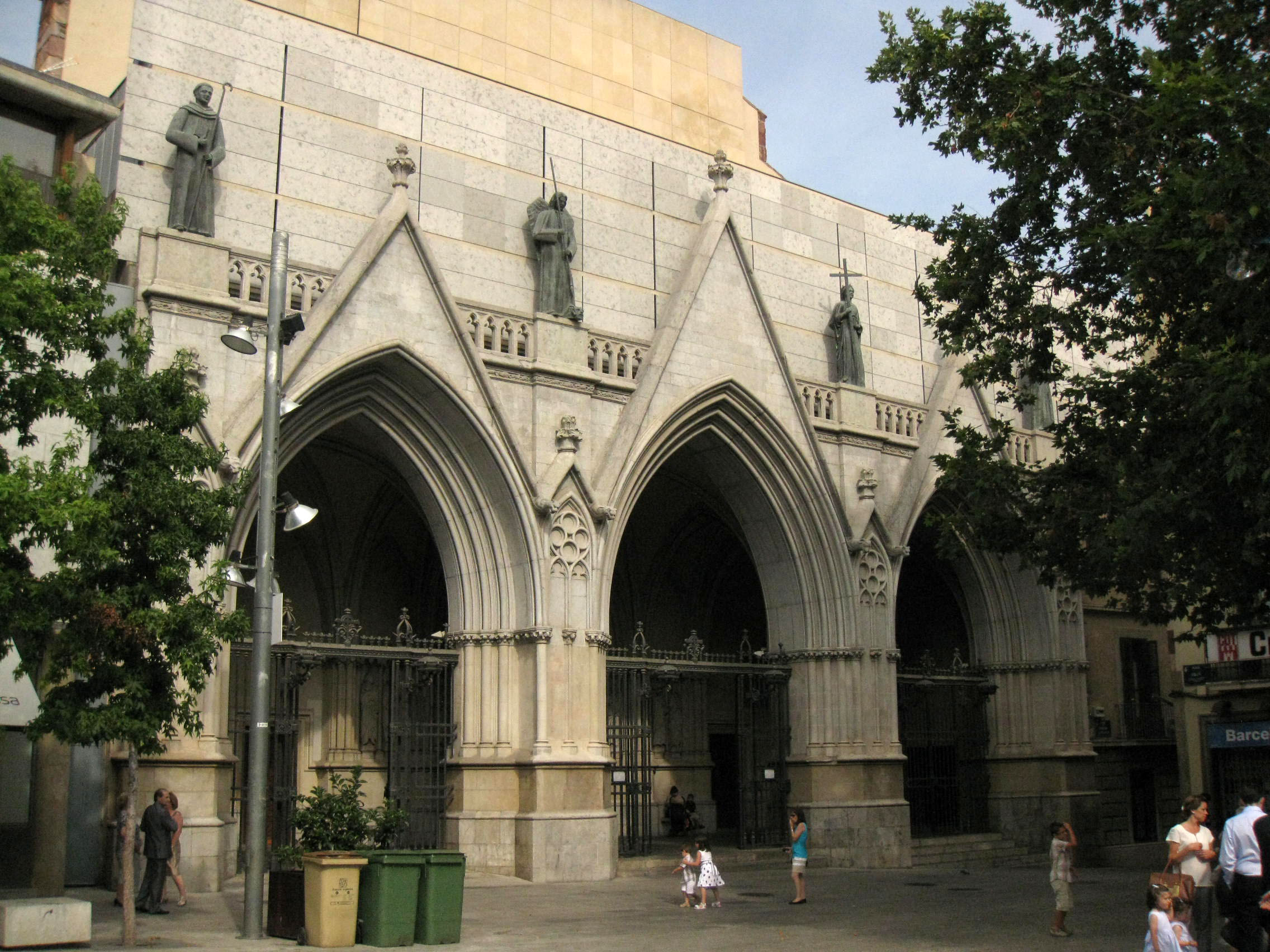
- Cathedral of the Holy Spirit, on the plaça Vella in Terrassa

Religion
- Affiliation: Roman Catholic Church
- Ecclesiastical or organizational status: cathedral

Location
- Location: Terrassa, Catalonia, Spain
- Interactive map of Terrassa Cathedral; Catedral-Basílica del Sant Esperit de Terrassa

Architecture
- Type: church

Terrassa Cathedral, or the Cathedral Basilica of the Holy Spirit (Catalan: Catedral de Terrassa, Catedral del Sant Esperit, Spanish: Catedral de Terrassa, Catedral del Espíritu Santo), is a Roman Catholic church located at the plaça Vella of Terrassa. It is the seat of the Diocese of Terrassa.

== History ==
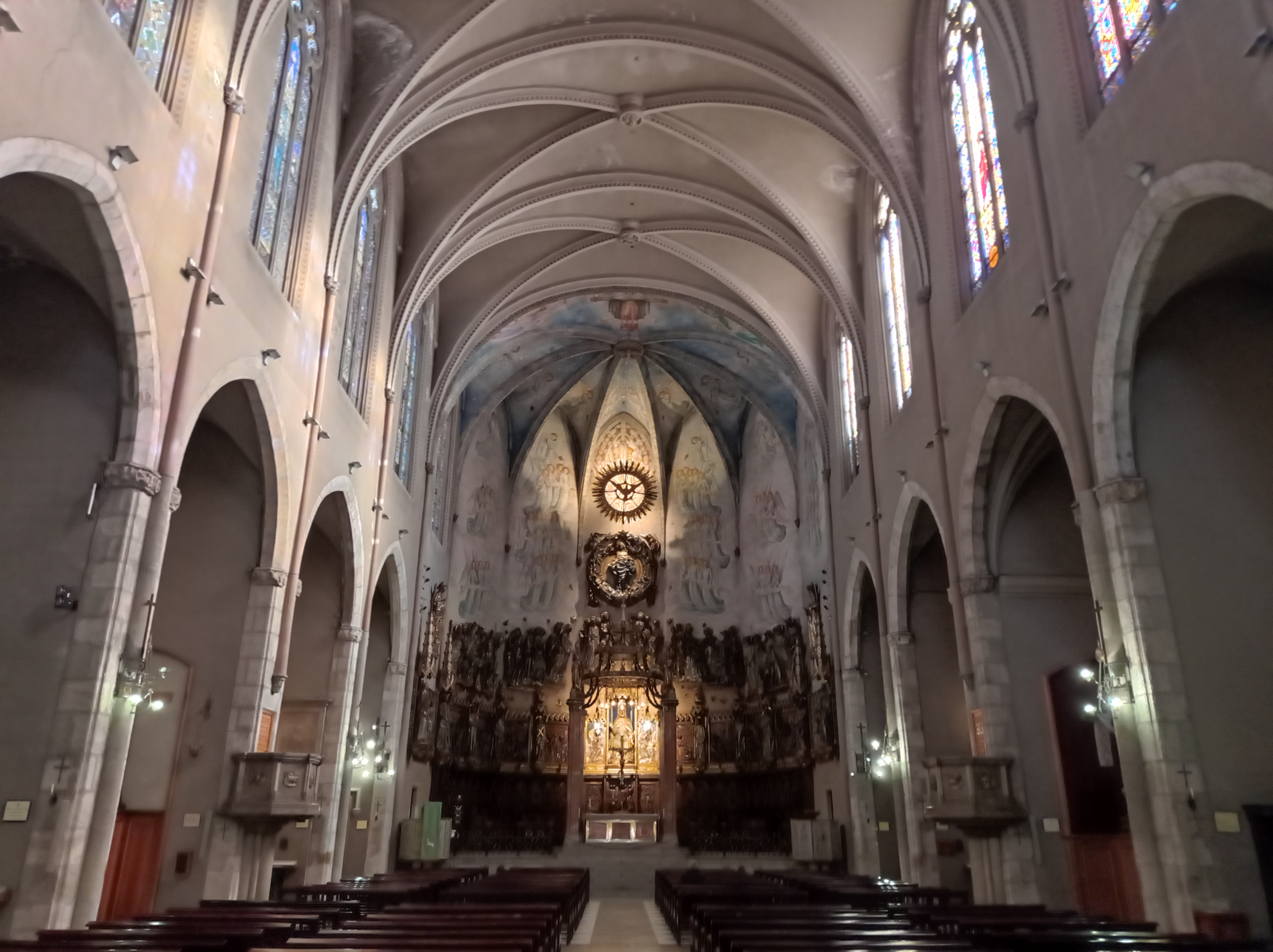
Interior of the cathedral

The church was built between 1574 and 1616. Despite being constructed during this period, the building is not Baroque in style, but rather continues the Gothic tradition. During the Spanish Civil War (1936–1939), the basilica suffered a fire caused by Republican forces that damaged its interior; it was also used as a vehicle parking garage during the conflict. It was restored in 1958. In 1999, the remodeling of the bell tower and the upper facade, which had previously been left unfinished, was completed, with a new section added to the top storey.

The Neo-Gothic entrance porch, erected in 1918, also suffered damage during the war and was rebuilt with apostolic sculptures by Nicanor Carballo, replacing those by Josep Llimona that had been destroyed in the fire. It was inaugurated in 1994. Since 2004, the Cathedral Basilica of the Holy Spirit has served as the seat of the newly created Diocese of Terrassa.

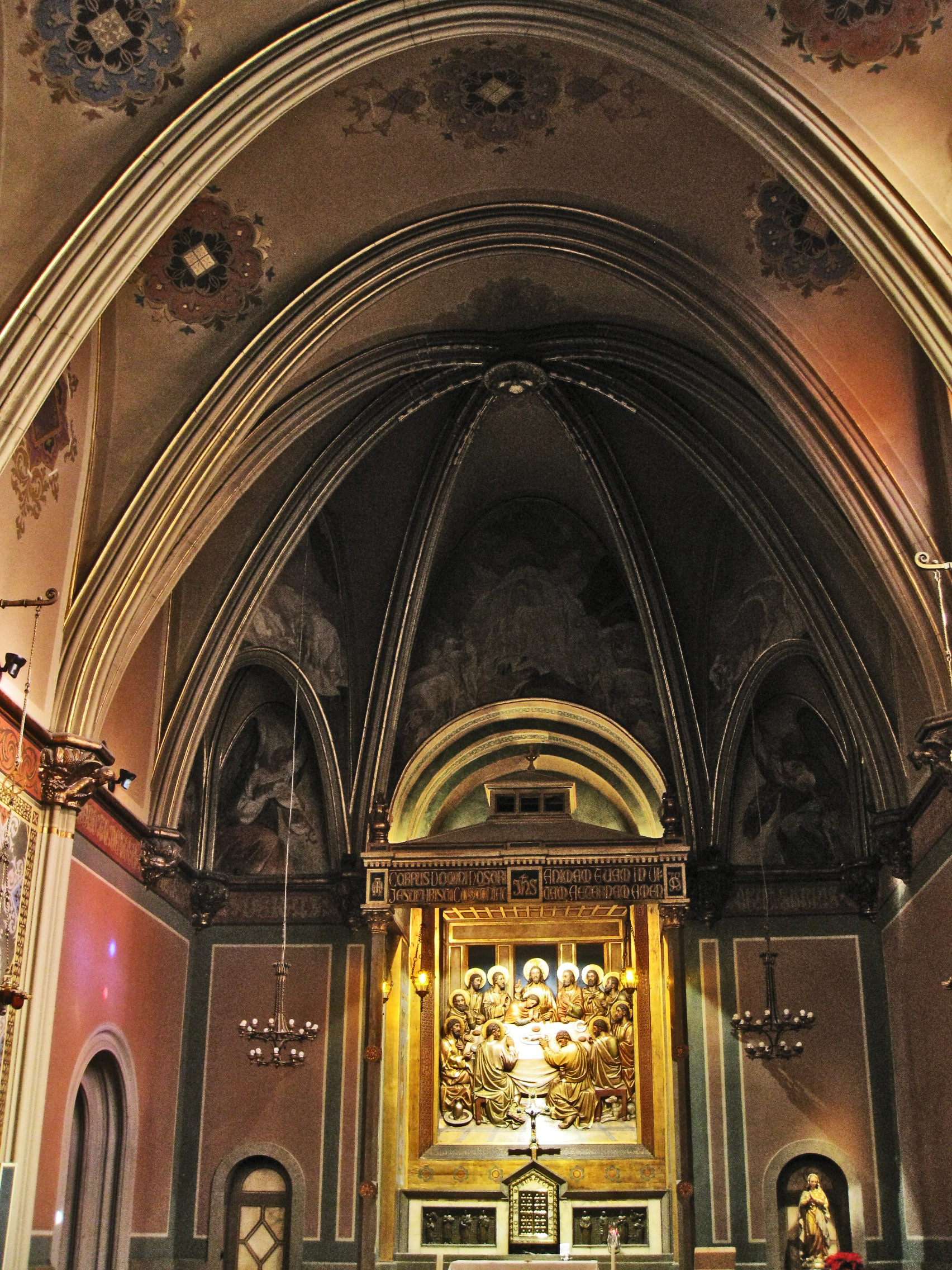
La capella del Santíssim

== See also ==
- Catholic Church in Spain
