= Catalan Prelitoral Depression =

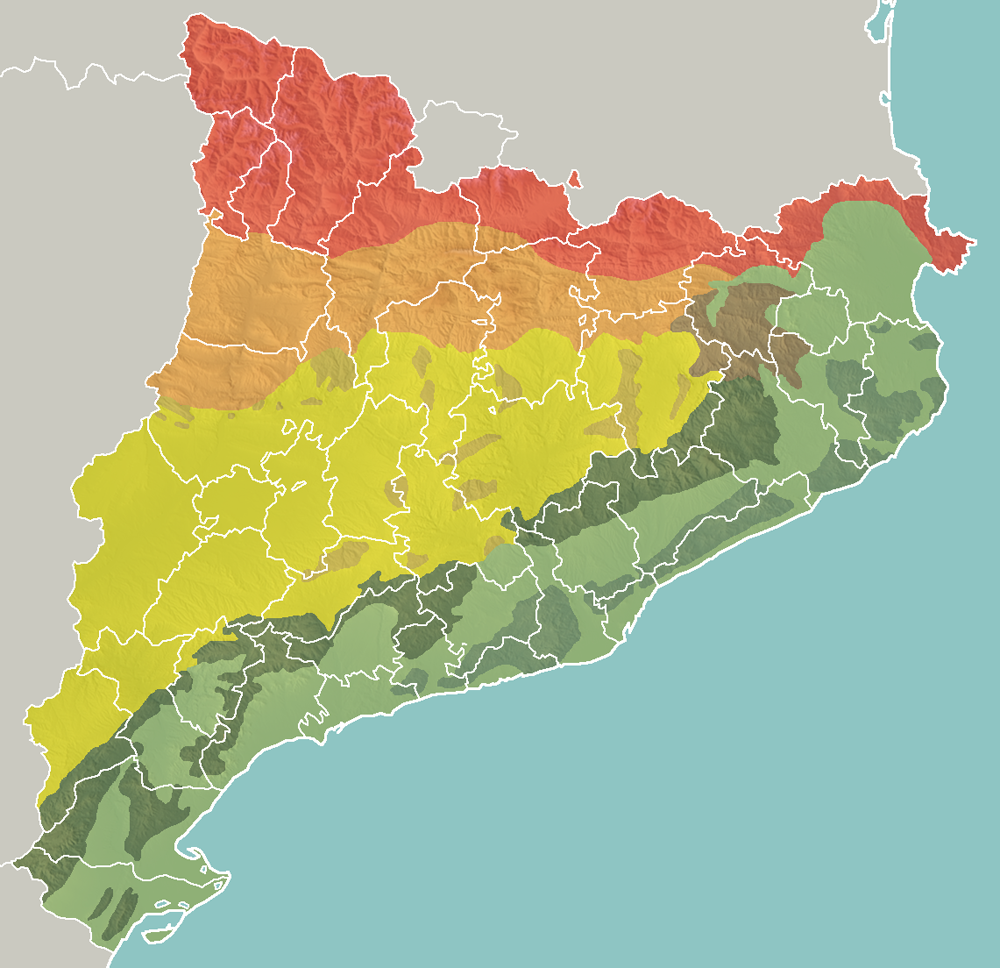
Map of the various morphostructural units of Catalonia: Pyrenees Pre-Pyrenees Central Depression Small foothills of the Central Depression / Catalan Transversal Range Pre-Coastal Range Coastal Range Catalan Coastal Depression, Pre-Coastal and other coastal plains

The Catalan Prelitoral Depression is a landform unit in Catalonia, located between the two Catalan Coastal Ranges: the Coastal Range to the southeast and the Pre‑Coastal Range to the northwest. These flank the depression, forming a natural corridor approximately 100 km long and 20 km wide.

The depression includes the natural regions of the Vallès and the Penedès, as well as parts of Baix Llobregat. Several rivers cross it, having carved passages through major faults in the Coastal Range: the Foix, the Llobregat, the Besòs, and the Tordera rivers. The origin of the depression is tectonic, corresponding to a subsided block relative to the neighboring ranges.

Since the time of the Roman Empire, the Prelitoral Depression’s location—running parallel to the Mediterranean coast but set slightly inland—has made it a natural corridor for north–south transit, allowing travelers and goods to bypass the city of Barcelona. Today, this same corridor is used by major transportation routes, including the AP‑7 motorway and the Renfe freight line that connects Tarragona and Girona.

== Industrialisation ==
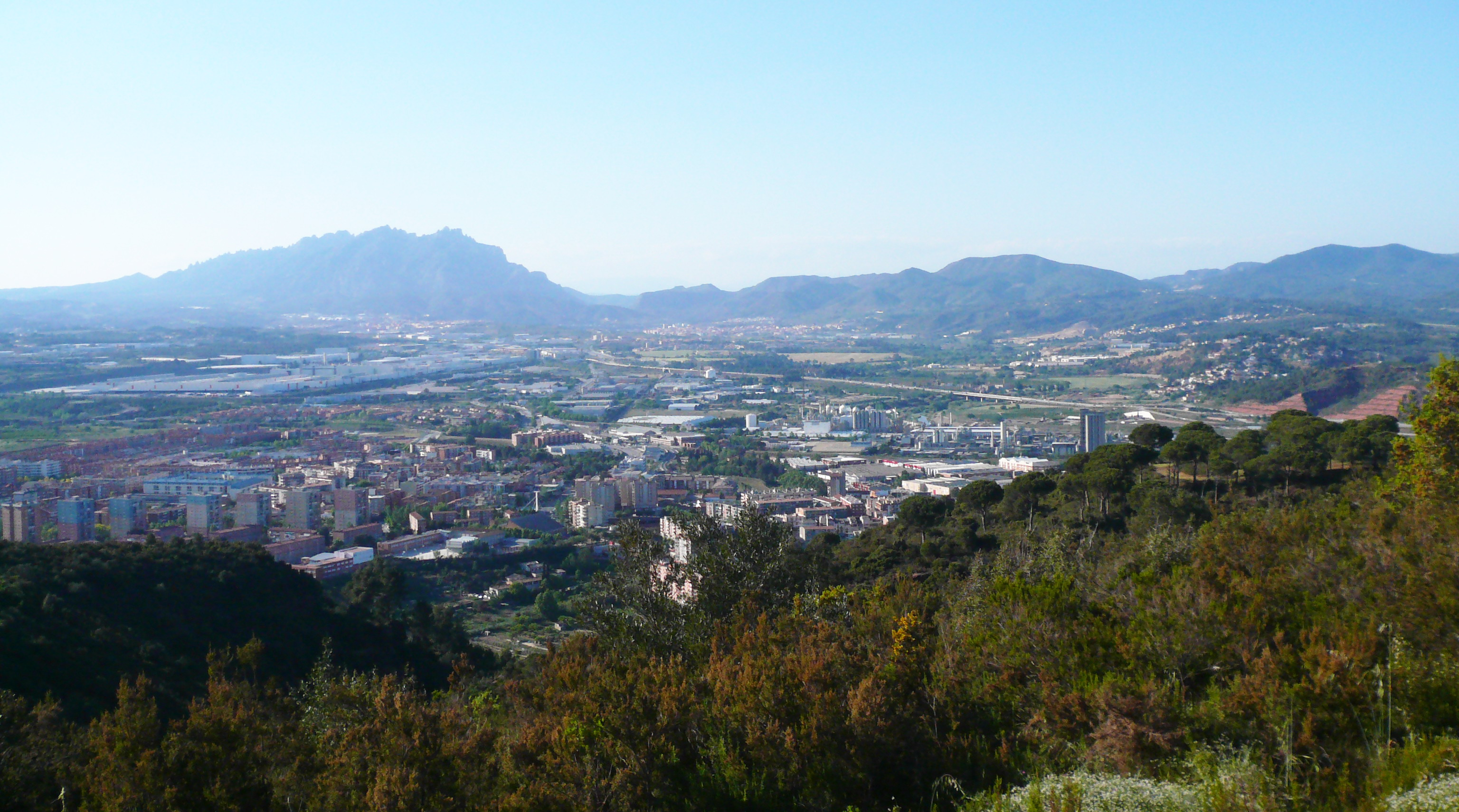
View of a heavily urbanized section of the Prelitoral Depression in the northern Baix Llobregat, from the Serra de l'Ataix, part of the Ordal Massif, in the Catalan Coastal Range. In the background are visible Montserrat and Sant Salvador de les Espases, both part of the Catalan Pre-Coastal Range.

Due to its strategic location and proximity to Barcelona, the Prelitoral Depression has become a major hub for diverse industries. Its geography and accessibility have encouraged the development of logistics, manufacturing, and service sectors across the region.

This industrial expansion has contributed to the significant growth of many towns—now cities—within the depression, such as Vilafranca del Penedès, Sant Sadurní d'Anoia, Martorell, Rubí, Terrassa, Sabadell, Sant Cugat del Vallès, Cerdanyola del Vallès, Barberà del Vallès, Mollet del Vallès, Granollers, Cardedeu, and Sant Celoni.
