= School of Engineering of Terrassa =

Unit of Universitat Politècnica de Catalunya

Coordinates: 41°33′51″N 2°01′21″E

- Escola d'Enginyeria de Terrassa
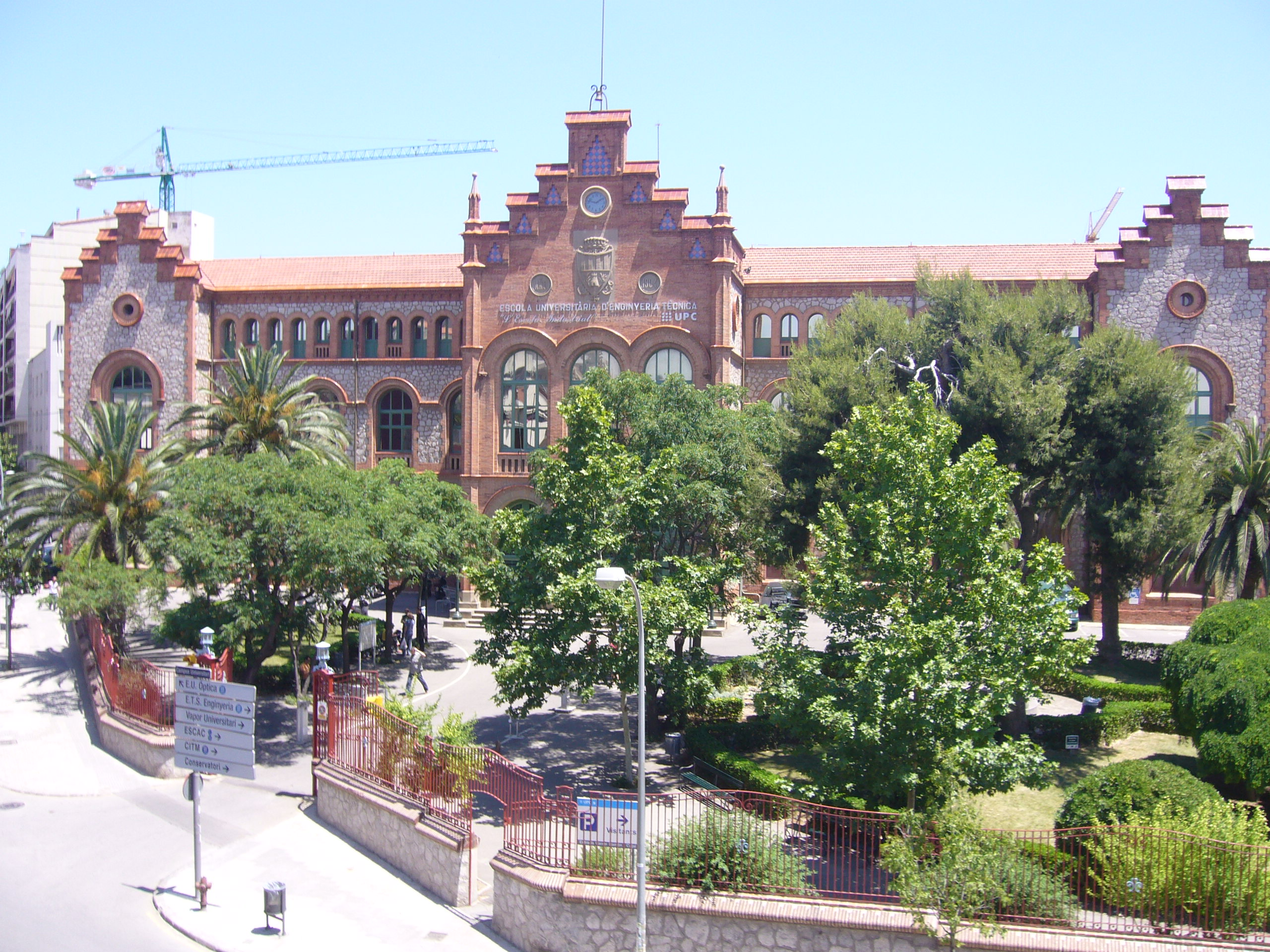
- Campus Terrassa
- Type: Public (Departament d'Universitats, Recerca i Societat de la Informació, Generalitat de Catalunya)
- Established: 1902
- Director: Javier Cañavate Ávila
- Students: 1521 (2009/2010)
- Location: Terrassa, Catalonia, Spain
- Website: www.eet.upc.edu

The School of Engineering of Terrassa (Catalan: Escola d'Enginyeria de Terrassa, EET), is one of the schools of the Universitat Politècnica de Catalunya (UPC), a public university located in Spain.

The school itself is located in Terrassa (province of Barcelona). It offers 8 degree programmes and there are 1,500 students enrolled.

EET is located in the Terrassa Campus of the UPC.

== Degrees ==
Degrees offered at EET are compliant with the European Higher Education Area (EHEA) and cover several subjects:

- Industrial engineering:
  - Bachelor's degree in electrical engineering
  - Bachelor's degree in industrial electronic and automatic control engineering
  - Bachelor's degree in mechanical engineering
  - Bachelor's degree in chemical engineering
  - Bachelor's degree in textile technology and design engineering
  - Bachelor's degree in industrial design product development engineering
- Telecommunication engineering:
  - Bachelor's degree in audiovisual systems engineering
- Master's degree in textile, paper, and graphic engineering

== History ==
The activity in the School of Engineering of Terrassa started in August 1901 and the teaching in February 1902. At the beginning it was known as the Escuela Superior de Industrias de Tarrassa ('High Industrial School of Terrassa') where the following areas were taught: engineering, practical engineering, and elementary education for workers.

Originally, the school was founded to cover the needs of the textile industry of Terrassa. This industry reached the peak of its development in the 19th century with the arrival of the steam engine and the new mechanical looms.

Initially, it was located at Topete Street 4; in July 1904, it moved to its current address, Colom Street 1, with the inauguration of its Catalan-modernist building. This work of art was a construction of the architect Lluís Muncunill Parellada. An exhibition celebrated during that year represented the most culminating moment of the applied arts. In 1943, the building became the property of the government and kept its teaching function.

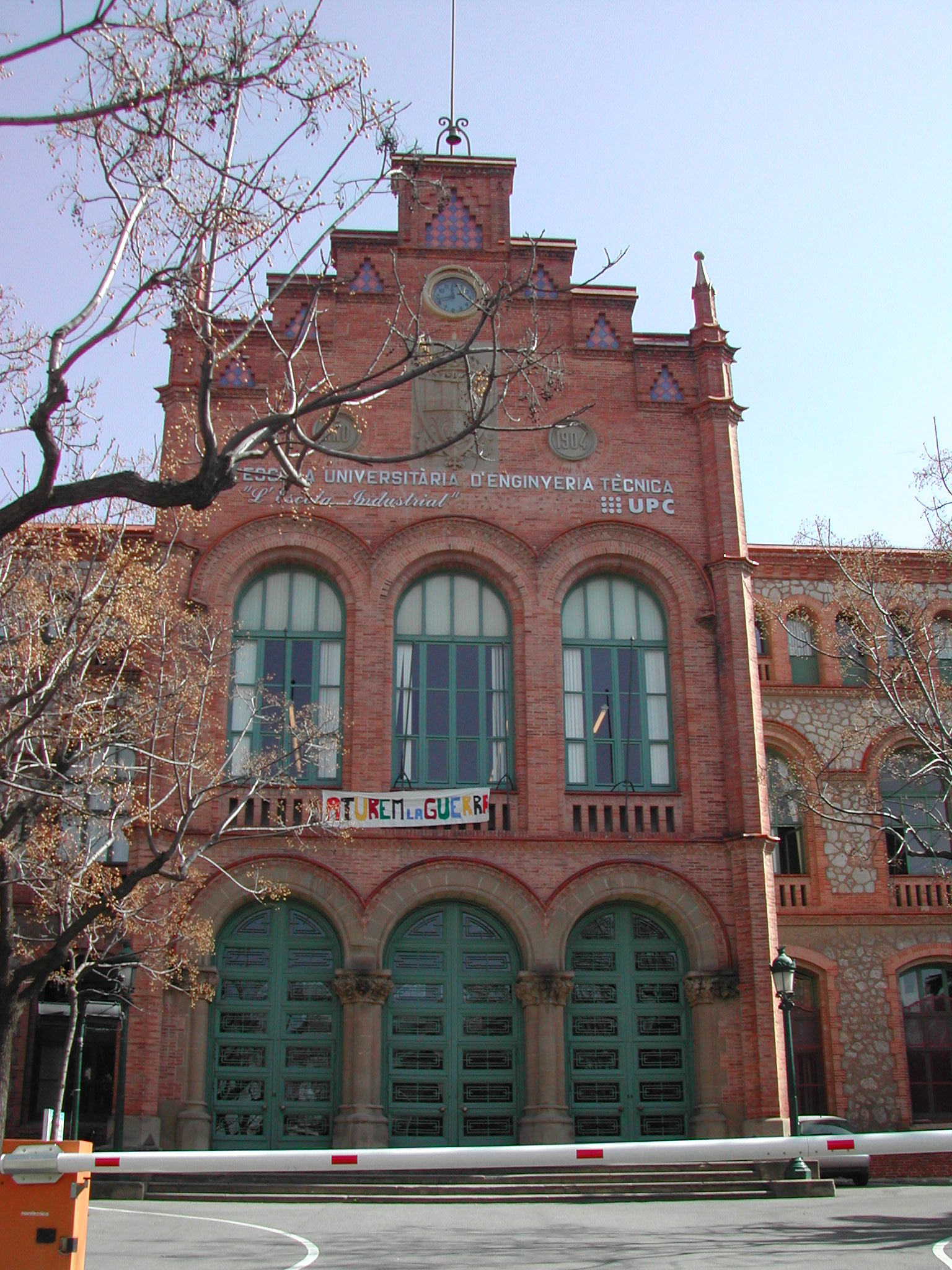
Detail of the main entrance

Textile engineering has been a programme of the School of Engineering of Terrassa since 1906, and now adapted to the new degrees. Other fields of engineering have also been taught in the school: chemical, mechanical, electrical, and electronic.

In 1962, the field of engineering was separated from the field of higher education and teaching activity started at the Escuela Técnica Superior de Ingenieros Industriales ('Technical High School of Industrial Engineering), at Colom Street 1.

In 1972, the school became part of the Universitat Politècnica de Barcelona, which later became Universitat Politecnica de Catalunya (UPC).

== A modernist building ==
The school's main building was one of the first works of Lluís Muncunill and was characterized by the influence of a historicist style. It is an isolated two-floor building with ground floor; it is U-shaped and surrounds a patio.

The main hall, which gives direct access to the classrooms, the library, and other rooms, is supported by steel columns and there is a bust of the founder of the school, Alfonso Salonsa. The main façade is notable for the stairs in the principal entrance and both lateral sections. According to the project of Josep Domènech i Mansana, two perpendicular naves were added to the ends of the original building that had the initial use of workshops.

== Location ==
EET consists of TR1 (main building), TR2 (back building), and TR3 (lateral nave) of the Terrassa campus, and the main entrance of TR1 is located at Colom Street 1.

The campus of the Universitat Politècnica de Catalunya is located in downtown Terrassa. It has good transport connection with Barcelona city and its metropolitan area (local trains of RENFE and FFCC, plus the city bus network).

Campus academic activity consists of undergraduate degrees, postgraduate (masters) degrees, and doctorate programmes. There are more than 5,000 students enrolled and it is considered as one of the most important universities in Catalunya.
