= Aleix Villatoro i Oliver =

Villatoro in 2023.

Aleix Villatoro i Oliver (born 1979 in Terrassa), is a Catalan politician and professor. He was the secretary general of foreign affairs, institutional relations and transparency in Carles Puigdemont's government.

Villatoro has a degree in political science and public administration from the Autonomous University of Barcelona and postgraduate studies in analysis and political communication. He began his professional career in the Audiovisual Council of Catalonia (Consell de l'Audiovisual de Catalunya) where during the three-party coalition era between PSC, Esquerra, and ICV, he held several positions, including head of institutional relations at the Department of Culture and Media between 2006 and 2007 or chief of staff of the Ministry between 2007 and 2010. Currently, he is assistant to the Director of the Fundació Joan Miró and professor of audiovisual communication of the International University of Catalonia (Universitat Internacional de Catalunya).
