= Sisante =

Sisante, Spain
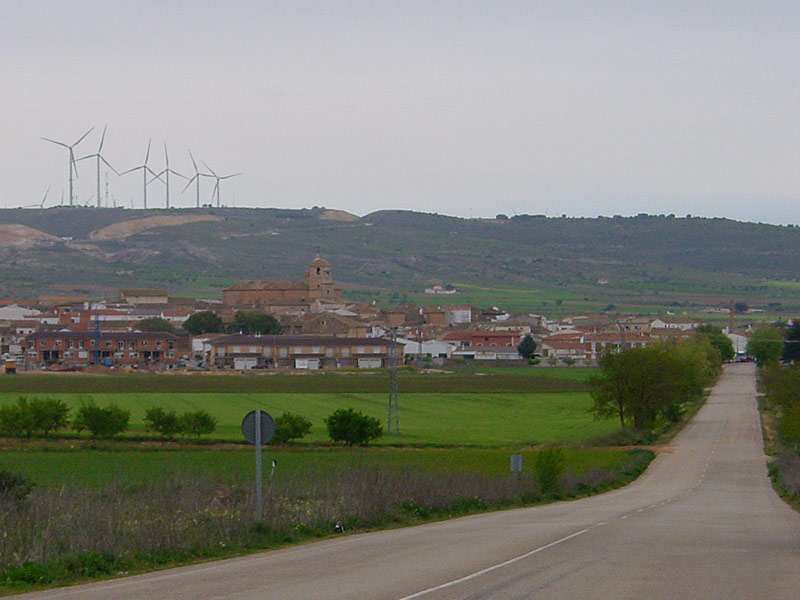
- A view of Sisante

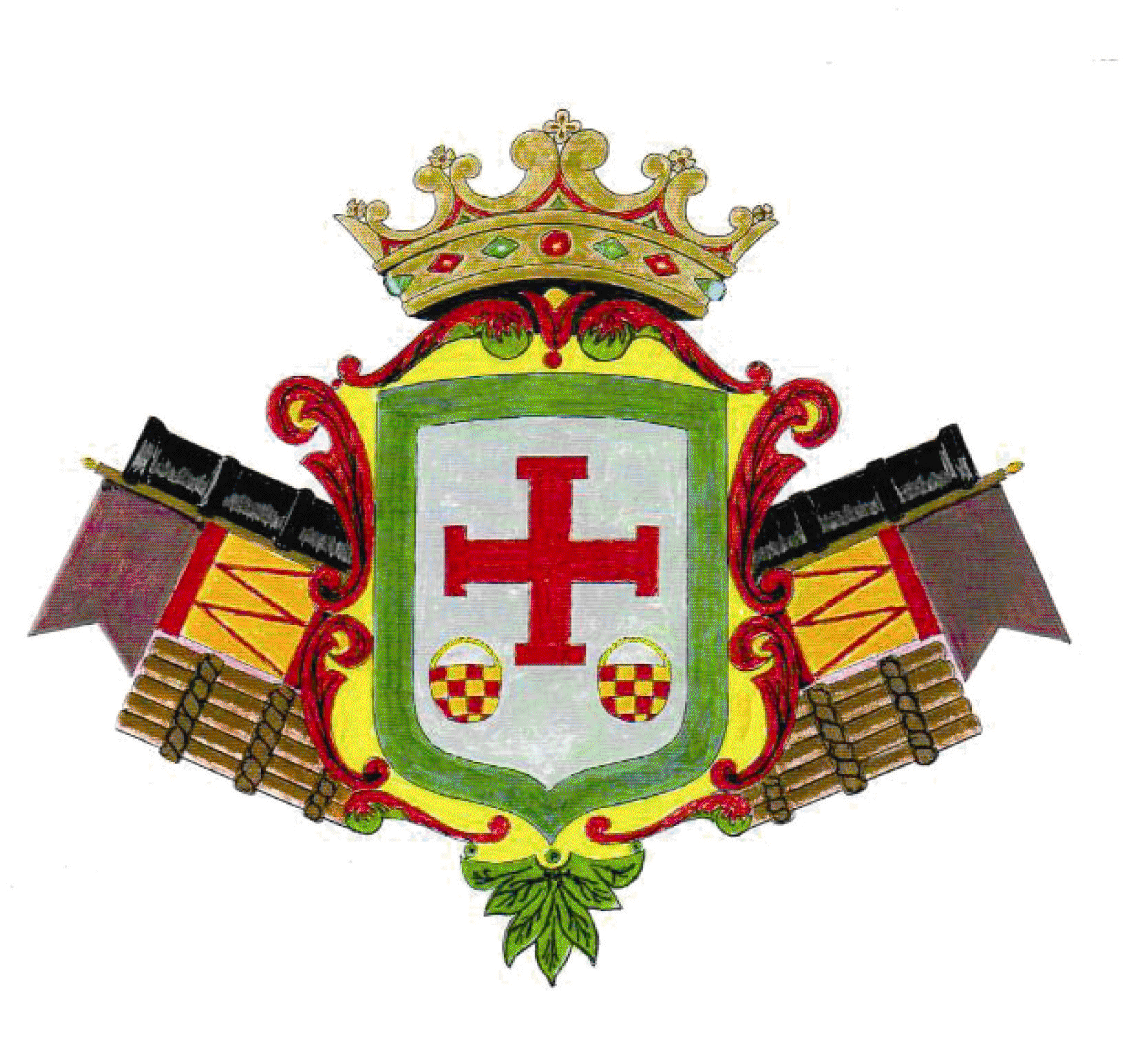
- Coat of arms

- Location within Spain Location within Castilla-La Mancha
- Coordinates: 39°25′N 2°13′W
- Country: Spain
- Autonomous community: Castile-La Mancha
- Province: Cuenca
- Municipality: Sisante

Area
  - Total: 134 km^{2} (52 sq mi)

Population (2025-01-01)
  - Total: 1,640
  - Density: 12.2/km^{2} (31.7/sq mi)
- Time zone: UTC+1 (CET)
  - Summer (DST): UTC+2 (CEST)

Sisante is a municipality located in the Cuenca Province, Castile-La Mancha, Spain. According to the 2004 census (INE), the municipality has a population of 1,795 inhabitants.
